= 2022 in Qatar =

- Decades: 2000s; 2010s; 2020s; 2030s
- See also: Other events of 2022; History of Qatar

Events in the year 2022 in Qatar.

== Incumbents ==
- Emir of Qatar – Tamim bin Hamad Al Thani

== Events ==
Ongoing — COVID-19 pandemic in Qatar

- 9 January – Qatar reports a record 3,487 new cases of COVID-19 in the past 24 hours, thereby bringing the nationwide total of confirmed cases to 266,344.
- 30 January – Qatar begins administering the Pfizer–BioNTech COVID-19 vaccine for children aged between 5 and 11 years. It comes after the Ministry of Public Health approves the use of the vaccine for this age group.
- 27 February – The Associated Press reveals that Qatar, the host of the World Cup, paid more than $10 million for "Project Riverbed", a covert influence campaign run between 2012 and 2014 by a former CIA operative's company, which was aimed at neutralizing Theo Zwanziger's criticism of FIFA's decision-making process for Qatar's host bid, which Zwanziger accused of being corrupt.
- 28 February – FIFA and UEFA suspend all Russian football clubs from international competitions and also ban the Russian national football team from competing at the 2022 FIFA World Cup in Qatar.
- 10 March – U.S. President Joe Biden designates Qatar as a Major non-NATO ally and announces his intention to designate Colombia with the same status.
- 25 March – The U.S. State Department cancels meetings with the Taliban leadership in Doha, Qatar, dealing with the Afghan economy, in response to the Taliban barring high-school girls from returning to school.
- 3 April – Qatar bans LGBT symbols at the 2022 FIFA World Cup.
- 29 June – Officials from the United States and the Taliban meet in Doha, Qatar, to discuss the ongoing humanitarian crisis in Afghanistan, worsened by the earthquake.
- 8 August – The government of Chad and more than 30 rebel and opposition factions sign a peace agreement at talks in Doha, Qatar. However, the main rebel group Front for Change and Concord in Chad rejects the agreement, saying that negotiators had not listened to their demands, which included the release of political prisoners.
- 18 August – Timane Erdimi, leader of the Chadian rebel group Rally of Forces for Change and nephew of slain Chadian president Idriss Déby, returns to the country from his 17-year exile in Qatar to participate in a peace process between the government and numerous rebel groups.
- 22 August – The cabinet of Pakistan approves the deployment of Pakistan Army troops to Qatar to provide security for the upcoming 2022 FIFA World Cup.
- 20 November – 18 December — 2022 FIFA World Cup

== Deaths ==
- 7 May – Adel Al Mulla, 51, Qatari footballer (1992 Olympic team, national team)
- 29 May – Kasia Al Thani, 45, American-born Qatari royal.
