= 2021 in Qatar =

- Decades: 2000s; 2010s; 2020s; 2030s
- See also: Other events of 2021; History of Qatar

Events in the year 2021 in Qatar.

== Incumbents ==
- Emir: Tamim bin Hamad Al Thani

== Events ==
Ongoing — COVID-19 pandemic in Qatar

- 5 January – The Qatar diplomatic crisis is resolved, having lasted since 2017.
- 12 January – Egypt reopens its airspace to Qatari aircraft, and will allow the resumption of direct flights between the countries, which have been suspended since 2017.
- 11 – 13 January – 2021 Judo World Masters are held in Doha.
- 16 January – Saudi Arabia's Foreign Minister Faisal bin Farhan Al Saud announces that Saudi Arabia will re-open its embassy in Qatar in the coming days, after a diplomatic crisis that saw the nations severing ties for three years.
- 7 April – Qatar announces a re-imposition of the strict lockdown beginning April 9, which will close restaurants, cafés, cinemas, hairdressers, museums, and libraries and ban most indoor activities, in order to reduce the number of COVID-19 cases.
- 16 May – After discussions in Qatar and Pakistan, Taliban representatives have reportedly agreed to substantive talks with the Afghan Republic team in Doha, and to attend a summit in Istanbul that they initially refused to attend.
- 17 May – The offices of the Qatar branch of the Red Crescent Society is destroyed by an Israeli air strike, killing two Palestinians and wounding ten others. The Qatari Foreign Ministry condemns the attack.
- 19 May – 2021 Qatari general election: The Qatari cabinet approves a draft law scheduling elections to the Shura Council for October, after several years of delays. The law also provides guidelines for voter registration and campaigning, such as allowing government employees to run and limiting expenditures to QAR2 million per candidate.
- 26 May – Qatari Foreign Minister Mohammed bin Abdulrahman bin Jassim Al Thani pledges US$500 million to help rebuild the Gaza Strip following the cessation in violence between Palestine and Israel.
- 31 July – Qatari weightlifter Fares El-Bakh wins the men's 96 kg event, receiving Qatar's first-ever Olympic gold medal.
- 31 August – The Indian ambassador to Qatar Dr. Deepak Mittal meets with Taliban representative Sher Mohammad Abbas Stanikzai in Doha to discuss the repatriation of Indian citizens who are currently in Afghanistan.
- 9 September – 2021 evacuation from Afghanistan: Qatar Airways conducts the first evacuation flight from Kabul's Hamid Karzai International Airport since the August 31 deadline.
- 12 September – Qatari foreign minister Mohammed bin Abdulrahman bin Jassim Al Thani becomes the first foreign diplomat to meet with the governing Taliban after arriving in Kabul today. Al Thani met with Taliban prime minister Hassan Akhund, former president Hamid Karzai and former chief negotiator Abdullah Abdullah.
- 19 September – Kabul Airlift: A Qatar Airways charter flight carrying 200 passengers, including Afghans and Americans, departs from Kabul International Airport to Qatar.
- 29 September – The U.S. Treasury Department, in coordination with Qatar, imposes sanctions on United Arab Emirates real estate company Aldar Properties and seven residents of Bahrain, Qatar and Saudi Arabia for allegedly financing Hezbollah.
- 2 October – 2021 Qatari general election: Qataris vote to elect 30 members of the Consultative Assembly in the country's first legislative elections.
- 9 October – The U.S. State Department confirms that the first face-to-face meetings with high representatives of the Taliban since the departure of U.S. troops from Afghanistan, will begin today in Doha, Qatar. A spokesperson for the State Department says that the U.S. will pressure the Taliban to "respect the rights of all Afghans, including women and girls" and form an inclusive government. The spokesperson also clarifies that this is not a recognition of the Taliban government by the U.S., saying that the Taliban will have to earn recognition by its actions.
- 17 December – Qatar reports its first four cases of the SARS-CoV-2 Omicron variant in three fully vaccinated people and an unvaccinated person who all travelled abroad.

== Deaths ==
- 14 December – Muamer Abdulrab, 39, Qatari footballer (Al-Sailiya, Al Kharaitiyat, national team)
