= List of Qatari films of 2014 =

The Qatari film industry produced over ten feature films in 2014. This article fully lists all non-pornographic films, including short films, that had a release date in that year and which were at least partly made by Qatar. It does not include films first released in previous years that had release dates in 2014.
Also included is an overview of the major events in Qatari film, including film festivals and awards ceremonies, as well as lists of those films that have been particularly well received, both critically and financially.

== Major releases ==
| Opening | | Title | Cast and Crew | Studio | Genre(s) | Ref. |
|---|---|---|---|---|---|---|
| F E B R U A R Y | 9 | History of Fear | Director: Benjamín Naishtat; Cast: Jonathan Da Rosa | | Drama | |
| S E P T E M B E R | 4 | Theeb | Director: Naji Abu Nowar; Cast: Jacir Eid Al-Hwietat | Film Movement | Drama | |
| S E P T E M B E R | 4 | The Valley | Director: Ghassan Salhab; Cast: Carol Abboud | | Drama | |

== Minor releases ==
| Title | Director | Release date | Genre |
|---|---|---|---|
| Area C | Jawad Al-Hamad | 2014 (Qatar) | |
| Ceuta: Multicultural City | Juan Carlos de Borbón | 2014 (Qatar) | |
| Songs of Freedom and Exile | Mohamed Issa | 2014 (Qatar) | |
| The Narrow Frame of Midnight | Tala Hadid | September 2014 (Canada) | Drama |

== See also ==
- 2014 in film
- 2014 in Qatar
