= 2019 in Qatar =

- Decades: 1990s; 2000s; 2010s; 2020s; 2030s
- See also: Other events of 2019; History of Qatar

Events in the year 2019 in Qatar.

== Incumbents ==
- Emir: Tamim bin Hamad Al Thani

== Events ==
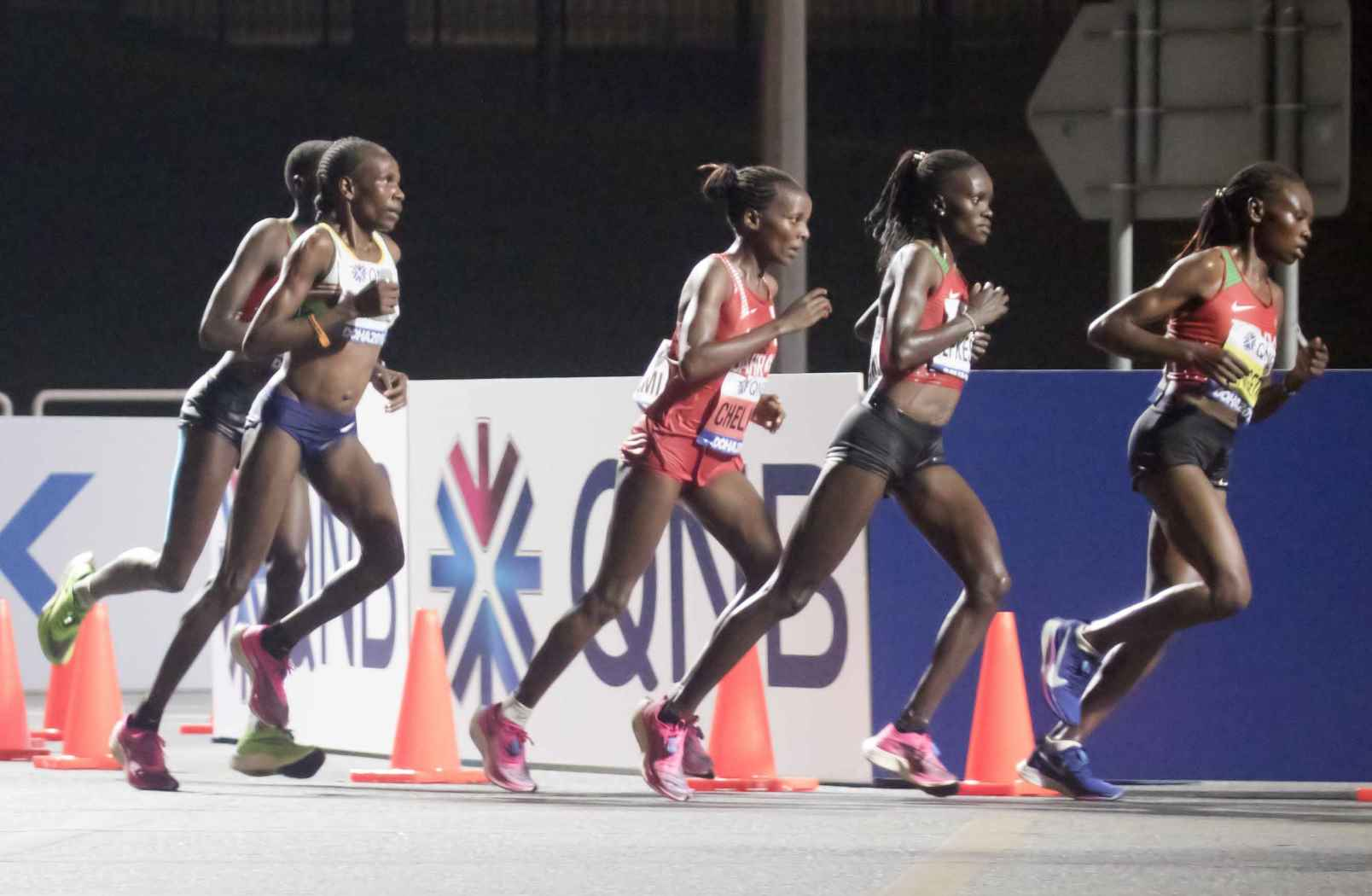
The leading group in women's marathon at the 2019 World Athletics Championships.

Ongoing — Qatar diplomatic crisis Ongoing — Qatar diplomatic crisis

- 16 April – The 2019 Qatari municipal elections.
- 27 September to 6 October – The 2019 World Athletics Championships were held in Doha.
- 12 to 16 October – The 2019 World Beach Games were held in Doha.

== Deaths ==
- 2 June – Mahmoud Soufi, footballer (born 1971).
