= 2011 in Qatar =

- Decades: 1990s; 2000s; 2010s; 2020s; 2030s
- See also: Other events of 2011; History of Qatar

This article lists some of the major events that took place in Qatar in 2011.

== Incumbents ==
- Emir: Hamad bin Khalifa Al Thani
- Prime Minister: Hamad bin Jassim bin Jaber Al Thani

== Events ==
=== Dated ===
- 12 May - According to Freedom House, Qatar remains "Not Free" with a political rights score of 6 and civil liberties score of 5, lacking electoral democracy, and facing restrictions on media, assembly, and political participation.
- 13 May - Qatar faces international criticism for ongoing human rights issues, including women's discrimination, migrant worker exploitation, arbitrary nationality deprivation, and the use of flogging and the death penalty.
- 5 November - Al Sadd becomes the first-ever Qatari club to win the Asian Champions League title in a dramatic shootout (5–4) against Jeonbuk after a 2–2 draw, with goalkeeper Mohamed Saqr saving two penalties.

=== Undated ===
- Qatar emerges as a key diplomatic force, supporting the Arab Spring uprisings, backing NATO's Libya intervention, and leading efforts in Syria.
- Al Jazeera plays a major role in coverage of worldwide and Qatari-wide events in 2011.
- Qatar's liquefied natural gas exports meet 25-30% of global demand, while the government strengthens ties with the UK and China through long-term gas supply agreements.
- Qatar secures Arab League support for a no-fly zone in Libya.
- The Qatari government calls for foreign intervention in the Syrian conflict during 2011.
- Qatar is suspected of being involved with military groups in foreign countries, including northern Mali the following year.
- Tensions rise between Qatar and Saudi Arabia as the government officially supports the Muslim Brotherhood.
