= 2017 in Qatar =

- Decades: 1990s; 2000s; 2010s; 2020s; 2030s
- See also: Other events of 2017; History of Qatar

This is a list of notable events that occurred in 2017 in Qatar.

== Incumbents ==
- Emir: Tamim bin Hamad Al Thani

== Events ==
=== June ===
- 5 June – Qatar plunges into diplomatic crisis as Bahrain, Egypt, Saudi Arabia, the United Arab Emirates and the internationally recognised government of Yemen sever ties with it, claiming that national security, media incitement and Qatari support for Iran are the cause.
- 6 June – The Philippines temporarily imposes a ban on foreign workers from going to Qatar. This is overturned the next day.
- 9 June – 59 individuals and 12 groups with links to Qatar are issued on a "terror list" by Saudi Arabia.
- 11 June – Iran sends five planes of food to Qatar, with more underway.
- 13 June – Dana Shell Smith steps down from US ambassador to Qatar amid allegations of state sponsored terrorism.
- 25 June – Bahrain officially issues Qatar a list of demands, including the cessation of relations with Iran, closure of a Turkish military base being constructed, suspend relations with groups like the Muslim Brotherhood and shut down Al Jazeera.

=== July ===
- 31 July – Qatar files a complaint to the World Trade Organization over the embargo placed by Arab states of the Persian Gulf in June, leading to all parties having 60 days to settle before WTO litigation.

=== September ===
- 8 September – Qatari Emir Al Thani telephones the Saudi Crown Prince to discuss the three-month-old diplomatic crisis. US President Donald Trump speaks to both leaders that regional unity is necessary to deter any threat posed by Iran.
- 9 September – Saudi Arabia suspends any dialogue by Qatar, accusing it of "distorting facts" in the reporting of yesterday's call suggesting a breakthrough in the dispute.
