= 2018 in Qatar =

- Decades: 1990s; 2000s; 2010s; 2020s; 2030s
- See also: Other events of 2018; History of Qatar

Events in the year 2018 in Qatar.

== Incumbents ==
- Emir: Tamim bin Hamad Al Thani

== Events ==
- 25 October to 5 November – The 2018 World Artistic Gymnastics Championships were held in Doha.
- 14 to 18 December – The 2018 WPA World Nine-ball Championship were held in Doha.

== Deaths ==
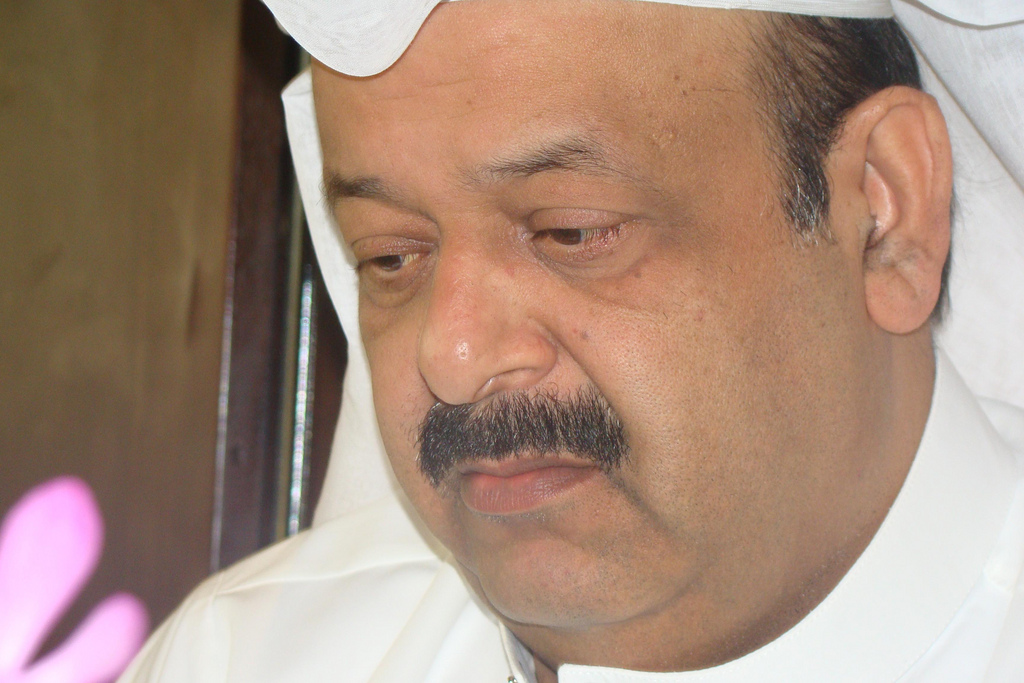
Abdulaziz Jassim

- 14 October – Abdulaziz Jassim, actor and comedian (born 1957).
