= 2014 in Qatar =

- Decades: 1990s; 2000s; 2010s; 2020s; 2030s
- See also: Other events of 2014; History of Qatar

The following lists events that happened during 2014 in Qatar.

== Incumbents ==
- Emir: Tamim bin Hamad Al Thani
- Prime Minister: Abdullah bin Nasser bin Khalifa Al Thani

== Events ==
=== September ===
- September 6 - Egypt charges former president Mohammed Morsi and nine others for leaking sensitive government information to Qatar.
