= 2019 Qatari municipal elections =

Municipal elections to the Central Municipal Council (CMC) in Qatar were held for the sixth time on 16 April 2019. The official number of people who voted is 13,334, about 1/13th of the Qatari population, and nine percent lower than in 2015.

== Results ==
Several "young, relatively unknown" candidates were elected in the place of several well-known establishment candidates.

== Analysis ==
A Qatar University pre-election opinion poll found that the most likely reasons for Qataris not intending to vote for the CMC were a lack of time, the CMC's lack of real political power, and the lack of an acceptable candidate.
