= 2020 in Qatar =

- Decades: 2000s; 2010s; 2020s; 2030s
- See also: Other events of 2020; History of Qatar

This is a list of notable events that occurred in 2020 in Qatar.

== Incumbents ==
- Emir: Tamim bin Hamad Al Thani

== Events ==
=== January ===
- 14 January – Qatar enacts Article 136 (bis) criminalizing “fake news”; the public backlash and Human Rights Watch criticizes it as a free speech setback.

=== February ===
- 6 February – Northwestern University move a Mashrou’ Leila talk from its Doha campus to Chicago due to security concerns, amid controversy over Qatar's restrictions on LGBT expression.
- 7 February – Labourers on World Cup-related projects receive two months of overdue wages after protesting non-payment.
- 13 February – Many Qatari managerial employees receive four to five months of delayed salaries after intervention by the government.
- 27 February – The first case in COVID-19 the country was confirmed.
- 29 February – Qatar hosts U.S.-Taliban talks, leading to a peace agreement aimed at ending the 19-year Afghan war.

=== March ===
- 11 March – Qatar enters its first official lockdown with retail, salons, and gyms closed; only groceries and pharmacies remain open.

=== April ===
- 7 April – Human Rights Watch and 28 other groups urge Qatar to unblock WhatsApp, Skype, and FaceTime during the COVID-19 pandemic; Teams and Zoom are already accessible.

=== May ===
- 2 May – A COVID-19 outbreak is reported in Doha central prison, with overcrowding, limited medical care, and inadequate hygiene. The Qatari government confirms the cases and says regular health checks and testings have been conducted.
- 22 May – The EHTERAZ contact-tracing app becomes mandatory; restrictions on vehicle capacity, buses, and group sports are introduced.

=== June ===
- 1 June – New legislation restricts outdoor work in extreme heat, prohibiting work from 10 a.m. to 3:30 p.m. and stopping work at wet-bulb globe temperatures above 32.1 °C.
- 28 June – Employees of Imperial Trading and Construction Company (ITCC) file complaints with the Labor Dispute Resolution Committees and local police over months of unpaid wages.

=== July ===
- 14 July – The International Court of Justice rules in favor of Qatar, rejecting an appeal by Bahrain, Saudi Arabia, Egypt and the United Arab Emirates (UAE), allowing the International Civil Aviation Organization (ICAO) to determine the legality of a 2017 package of sanctions which included air blockades.

=== August ===
- 30 August – Qatar ends the kafala system, allowing migrant workers to change jobs freely, introducing a non-discriminatory minimum wage of 1,000 QAR with allowances for food and housing.

=== October ===
- 2 October – Qatari authorities subject women on a Qatar Airways flight to forced gynecological exams after a premature baby is found abandoned at Hamad International Airport.
- 27 October – The Qatari Government Communications Office confirms that the Labor Ministry had opened legal proceedings against Lalibela Cleaning & Services for unpaid wages and delayed salary payments.

=== December ===
- 21 December – The Pfizer-BioNTech vaccine arrives in Qatar; priority is given to seniors, chronic patients, and frontline health workers.
