= History of Qatar =

The history of Qatar spans from its first duration of human occupation to its formation as a modern state. Human occupation of Qatar dates back 50,000 years, and Stone Age encampments and tools have been unearthed in the Arabian Peninsula. Mesopotamia was the first civilization to have a presence in the area during the Neolithic period, evidenced by the discovery of potsherds originating from the Ubaid period near coastal encampments.

The peninsula fell under the domain of several different empires during its early years of settlement, including the Seleucid, the Parthians and the Sasanians. In 628 AD, the population was introduced to Islam after Muhammad sent an envoy to Munzir ibn Sawa who was the Sasanid governor of Eastern Arabia. It became a pearl trading center by the 8th century. The Abbasid era saw the rise of several settlements. After the Bani Utbah and other Arab tribes conquered Bahrain in 1783, the Al Khalifa imposed their authority over Bahrain and mainland Qatar. Over the following centuries, Qatar was a site of contention between the Wahhabi of Najd and the Al Khalifa. The Ottomans expanded their empire into Eastern Arabia in 1871, withdrawing from the area in 1915 after the beginning of World War I.

In 1916, Qatar became a British protectorate and Abdullah Al Thani signed a treaty stipulating that he could only cede territory to the British in return for protection from all aggression by sea and support in case of a land attack. A 1934 treaty granted more extensive protection. In 1935, a 75-year oil concession was granted to Qatar Petroleum and high-quality oil was discovered in 1940 in Dukhan.

During the 1950s and 1960s, increasing oil revenues brought prosperity, rapid immigration, substantial social progress, and the beginnings of the country's modern history. After Britain announced a policy of ending the treaty relationships with the Persian Gulf sheikdoms in 1968, Qatar joined the other eight states then under British protection in a plan to form a federation of Arab emirates. By mid-1971, as the termination date of the British treaty relationship approached, the nine still had not agreed on terms of union. Accordingly, Qatar declared its independence on September 3, 1971. In June 1995, deputy emir Hamad bin Khalifa became the new emir after he deposed his father Khalifa bin Hamad in a bloodless coup. The Emir permitted more liberal press and municipal elections as a precursor to parliamentary elections. A new constitution was approved via public referendum in April 2003 and came into effect in June 2004.

== Prehistory ==
=== Paleolithic Age ===
In 1961, a Danish archaeological expedition carried out on the peninsula uncovered approximately 30,000 stone implements from 122 Paleolithic sites. Most of the sites were situated along the coastline, and were divided into four separate cultural groups based on flint typology. Macrolithic tools such as scrapers, arrowheads and hand axes dating to the Lower and Middle Paleolithic periods were among the discoveries.

The flooding of the Persian Gulf, roughly 8,000 years ago, resulted in the displacement of Persian Gulf inhabitants, the formation of the Qatari Peninsula and the occupation of Qatar to capitalize on its coastal resources. From this time onward, Qatar was regularly used as rangeland for nomadic tribes from the Najd and al-Hasa regions in Saudi Arabia, and a number of seasonal encampments were constructed around sources of water.

=== Neolithic period (8000–3800 BC) ===
Al Da'asa, a settlement located on the western coast of Qatar, is the most extensive Ubaid site in the country. It was excavated by the 1961 Danish team. The site is theorized to have accommodated a small seasonal encampment, possibly a lodging for a hunting-fishing-gathering group who made recurrent visits. This is evidenced by the discovery of nearly sixty fire pits at the site, which may have been used to cure and dry fish, in addition to flint tools such as scrapers, cutters, blades and arrowheads. Furthermore, many painted Ubaid potsherds and a carnelian bead were found in the fire pits, suggesting overseas connections.

In an excavation done in Al Khor in 1977–78, several Ubaid-period graves were uncovered in what is considered the earliest recorded burial site in the country. One grave contained the cremated remains of a young woman with no grave goods. Eight other graves contained grave goods, including beads made of shell, carnelian, and obsidian. The obsidian most likely originated from Najran in southwest Arabia.

=== Bronze Age (2100–1155 BC) ===
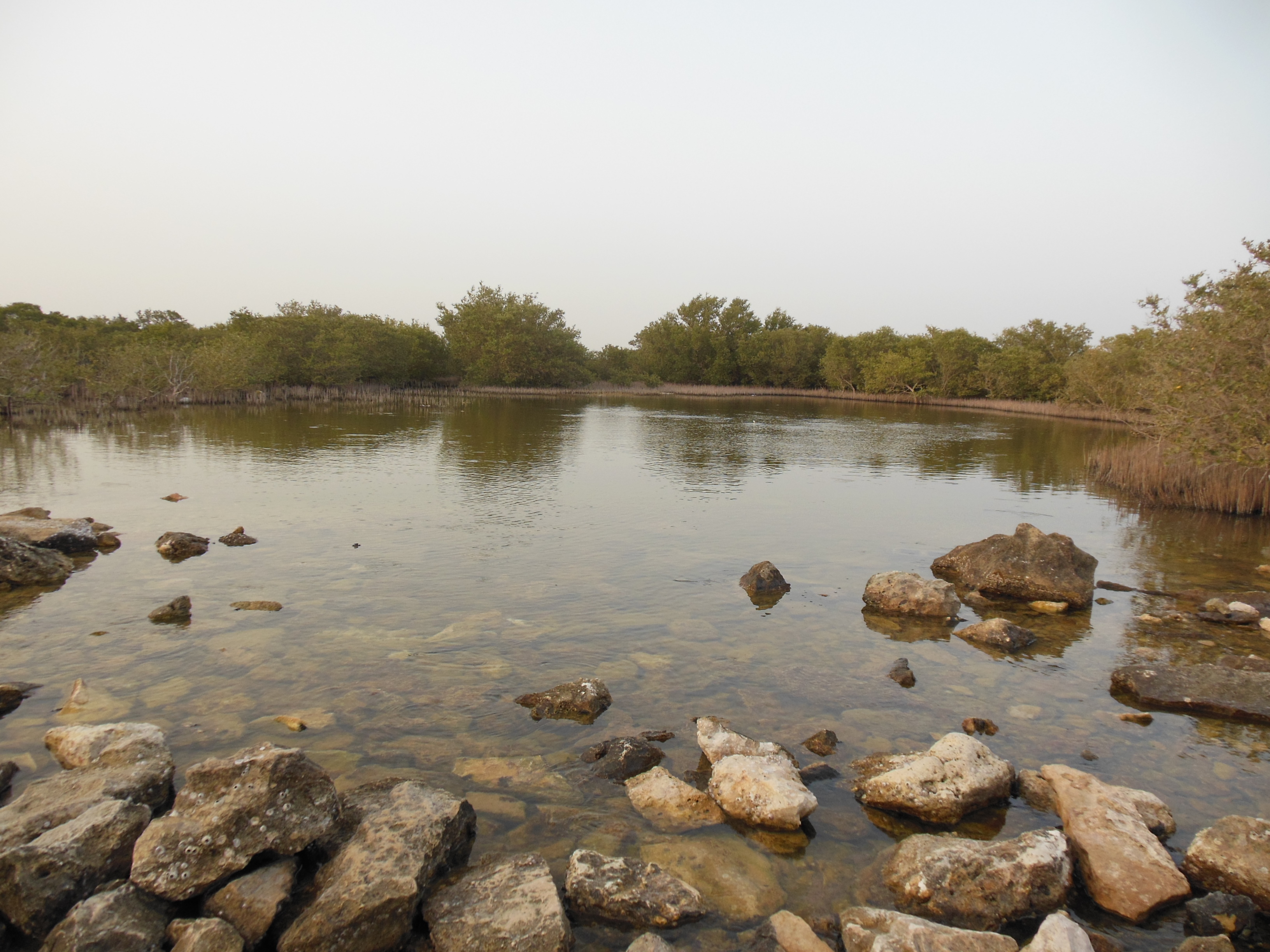
Al Khor Island, the location of the purple dye industry

The Qatari Peninsula was close enough to the Dilmun civilization in Bahrain to have felt its influence. Barbar pottery was excavated in two sites by the Qatar Archaeology Project, suggesting Qatar's involvement in Dilmun's trade network. When the people of Dilmun began engaging in maritime activities around 2100 to 1700 BC, the inhabitants of Qatar started diving for pearls in the Persian Gulf. The Qataris were engaged in the trading of pearls and date palms during this era.

It has been argued that the remains of Dilmun settlements found in Qatar do not represent major evidence of long-term human habitation. Qatar remained largely uninhabited during this period due to regular migration by nomadic Arab tribes searching for untapped food and water sources. The settlements dating to the Dilmun period, particularly in Al Khor Island, may have been established to expedite trade journeys between Bahrain to the closest significant settlement in the Persian Gulf, Tell Abraq. Another scenario entails that the encampments were created by visiting fishermen or pearl fishers from Dilmun. It has also been suggested that the presence of pottery is indicative of trade between the inhabitants of Qatar and the Dilmun civilization, though this is considered unlikely due to the scarce population of the peninsula during this period.

Kassite Babylonian-influenced materials dating back to the second millennium BC, which were found in Al Khor Island, are evidence of trade relations between the inhabitants of Qatar and the Kassite. Among the findings were 3,000,000 crushed snail shells and Kassite potsherds. It has been asserted that Qatar was the site of the earliest known production of shellfish dye owing to a purple dye industry operated by the Kassite which existed on the island. The dye was obtained from the murex snail and was known as "Tyrian purple". Dye production may have been supervised by the Kassite administration in Bahrain to export the dye to Mesopotamia.

== Antiquity ==
=== Iron Age and Babylonian–Persian control (680–325 BC) ===
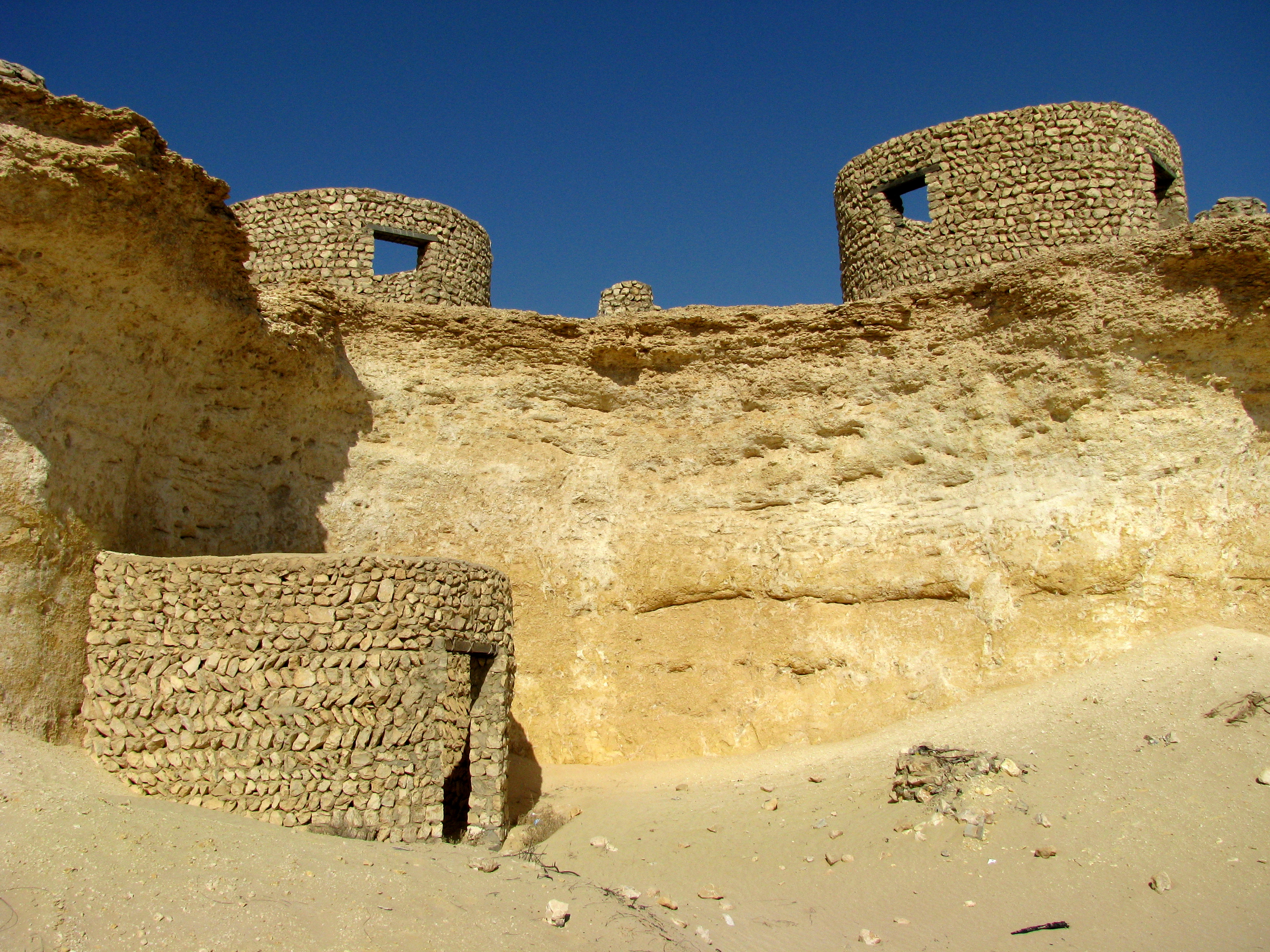
Reconstructed ruins in Zekreet, on the west coast of Qatar near Ras Abrouq.

Assyrian king Esarhaddon led a successful campaign against Bazu, an area which encompassed Dilmun and Qatar, in c. 680 BC. To date, no archaeological evidence of early Iron Age settlements has been discovered in the peninsula. This is likely due to adverse climatic changes rendering Qatar less inhabitable during this period.

In the 5th century BC, Greek historian Herodotus published the earliest known description of the population of Qatar, describing its inhabitants as 'sea-faring Canaanites'.

=== Hellenistic period (325–250 BC) ===
Around 325 BC, Alexander the Great sent his top admiral, Androsthenes of Thasos, to survey the entire Persian Gulf. The requested charts arrived shortly after Alexander died in 323 BC. Seleucus I Nicator was awarded the eastern part of the Ancient Greek Empire after Alexander's death. Starting from 312 BC, he expanded the Seleucid Empire eastward of Babylon, purportedly encompassing parts of Eastern Arabia. Archaeological evidence of Greek-influenced materials has been discovered in Qatar. Excavations north of Dukhan uncovered potsherds of Seleucid characteristics, and a cairnfield consisting of 100 burial mounds dating to the era was discovered in Ras Abrouq. The relatively large number of cairns suggest a sizeable sea-faring community prevailed in the area.

After losing most of their territories in the Persian Gulf, Seleucid influence ceased in the area by c. 250 BC.

=== Persian control (250 BC – 642 AD) ===
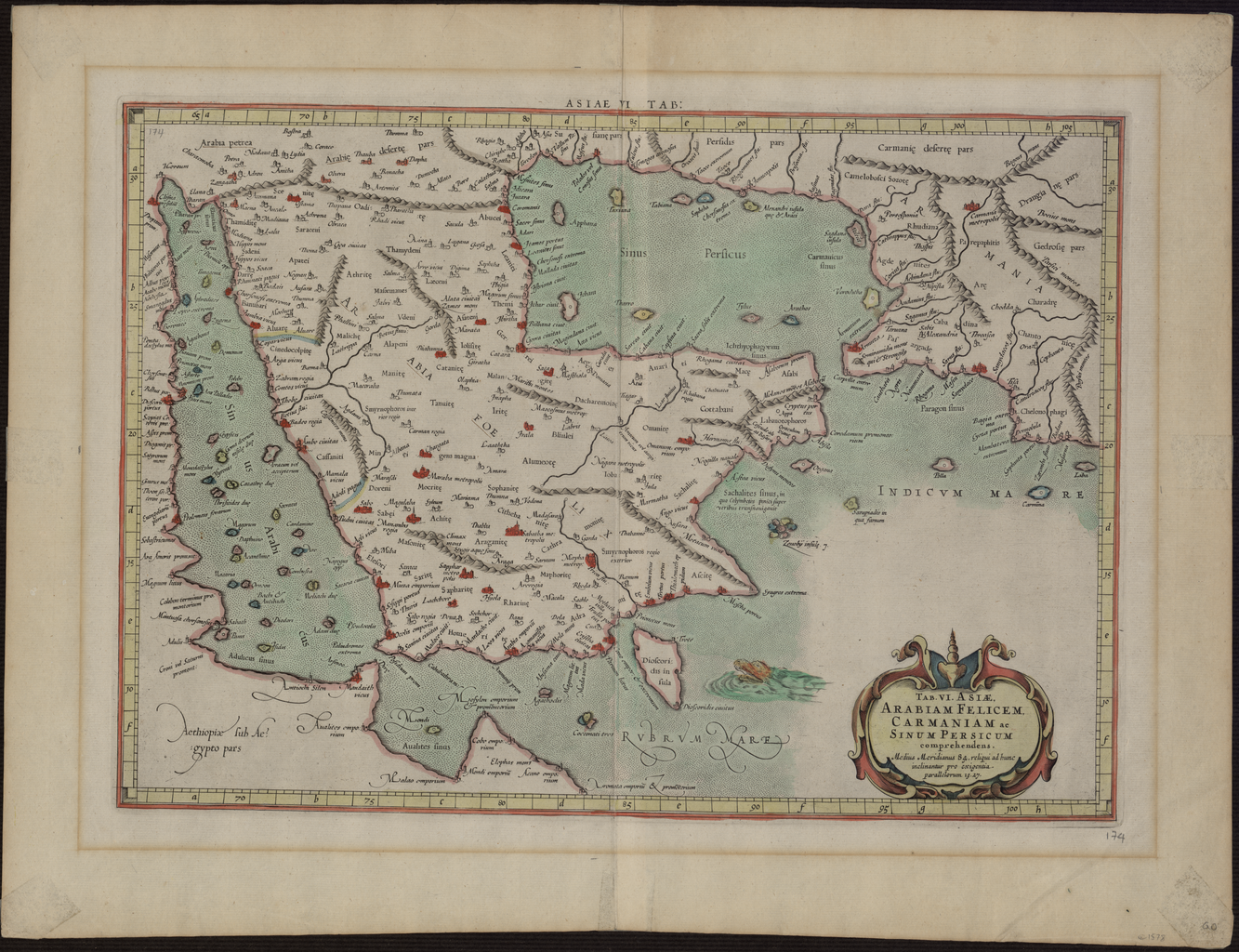
The earliest known depiction of Qatar as Catura in Ptolemy's map produced in the 2nd century.

Following the eviction of the Seleucid by the Parthian Empire in c. 250 BC, the latter gained dominion over the Persian Gulf and Arabian coast. As the Parthians were dependent on trade routes through the Persian Gulf, they established garrisons along the coast. Pottery recovered from expeditions in Qatar has demonstrated links to the Parthian Empire.

Ras Abrouq, a coastal city north of Dukhan, housed a fishing station which foreign vessels used to dry fish in 140 BC. Several stone structures and large quantities of fish bones were recovered from the site.

Pliny the Elder, a Roman author, wrote an account of the peninsula's inhabitants around the mid-first century AD. He referred to them as the "Catharrei" and described them as nomads who constantly roamed in search of water and food. Around the second century, Ptolemy produced the first known map to depict the landmass, referring to it as "Catura".

The Sasanian Empire at its greatest extent c. 620, under Khosrow II

In 224 AD, the Sasanian Empire gained control over the territories surrounding the Persian Gulf. Qatar played a role in the commercial activity of the Sasanids, contributing to at least two commodities: precious pearls and purple dye. Sasanid pottery and glassware were found in Mezru'ah, a city north-west of Doha, and fragments of glassware and pottery were discovered in a settlement in Umm al-Ma'a.

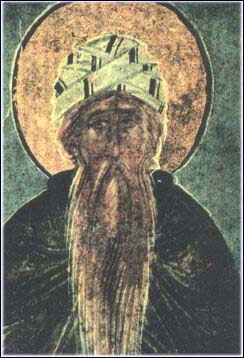
Isaac of Nineveh, sometimes referred to as 'Isaac of Qatar', was born in Beth Qatraye

Under the Sasanid reign, many of the inhabitants in Eastern Arabia were introduced to Christianity after the religion was dispersed eastward by Mesopotamian Christians. Monasteries were constructed in Qatar during this era, and further settlements were founded. During the latter part of the Christian era, Qatar was known by the Syriac name 'Beth Qatraye' (ܒܝܬ ܩܛܪܝܐ; "region of the Qataris"). A variant of this was 'Beth Catara'. The region also included Bahrain, Tarout Island, Al-Khatt, and Al-Hasa. The dioceses of Beth Qatraye did not form an ecclesiastical province, except for a short period during the mid-to-late seventh century. They were instead subject to the Metropolitan of Fars.

Muhammad sent Al-Ala'a Al-Hadrami, a Muslim envoy, to a Persian ruler in Eastern Arabia named Munzir ibn Sawa Al Tamimi in 628 and requested that he and his people accept Islam. Munzir obliged his request, and most Arab tribes in Qatar converted to Islam. It has been proposed by historian Habibur Rahman that Munzir ibn Sawa's seat of administration existed in the Murwab or Umm al-Ma'a area of Qatar. This theory is supported by an archaeological find of approximately 100 small stone-built Islamic-period houses and fortified palaces of a tribal leader in Murwab, which are thought to have originated from the early Islamic period. After the adoption of Islam, the Arabs led the Muslim conquest of Persia which resulted in the fall of the Sasanian Empire.

It is likely that some settled populations in Qatar did not immediately convert to Islam. Isaac of Nineveh, a 7th-century Syriac Christian bishop regarded as a saint in some churches, was born in Beth Qatraye. Other notable Christian scholars dating to this period who hailed from Beth Qatraye include Dadisho Qatraya, Gabriel of Qatar, Gabriel Arya and Ahob of Qatar. In 674, the bishops of Beth Qatraye stopped attending synods.

== Caliphate rule ==
=== Umayyad period (661–750) ===
Qatar was described as a famous horse and camel breeding centre during the Umayyad period. It began benefiting from its commercially strategic position in the Persian Gulf during the 8th century, going on to become a center of pearl trading.

During the Second Fitna, a renowned Khariji commander named Qatari ibn al-Fuja'a, who was described as the most popular, admired and powerful Khariji leader, led the Azariqa, a sub-sect of the Khawarij, into numerous battles. He held the title of Amir al-Mu'minin and ruled over the radical Azariqa movement for more than 10 years. Born in Al Khuwayr in Qatar, he also minted the first known Kharjite coins, the earliest of which dated to 688 or 689.

The Umayyad Caliphate brought about much political and religious change in Western Asia starting from the late seventh century. As a result, there were many revolts against the Umayyad at the end of the seventh century, particularly in Qatar and Bahrain. Ibn al-Fuja'a led an uprising against the Umayyad caliphs for more than twenty years.

In 750, discontent in the caliphate had reached a critical level due to the treatment of non-Arab citizens in the Empire. The Abbasid Revolution resulted in the overthrow of the Umayyad Caliphate, ushering in the Abbasid period.

=== Abbasid period (750–1253) ===
Several settlements, including Murwab, were developed during the Abbasid period. Over 100 stone-built houses, two mosques, and an Abbasid fort were constructed in Murwab during this era. Murwab fort is the oldest intact fort in the country and was built over the ruins of a previous fort which was destroyed by fire. The town was the site of the first sizable settlement established off the coastal area of Qatar. A similar site, containing T'ang stoneware and dating to the 9th and 10th centuries, was discovered in Al Naman (north of Zubarah).

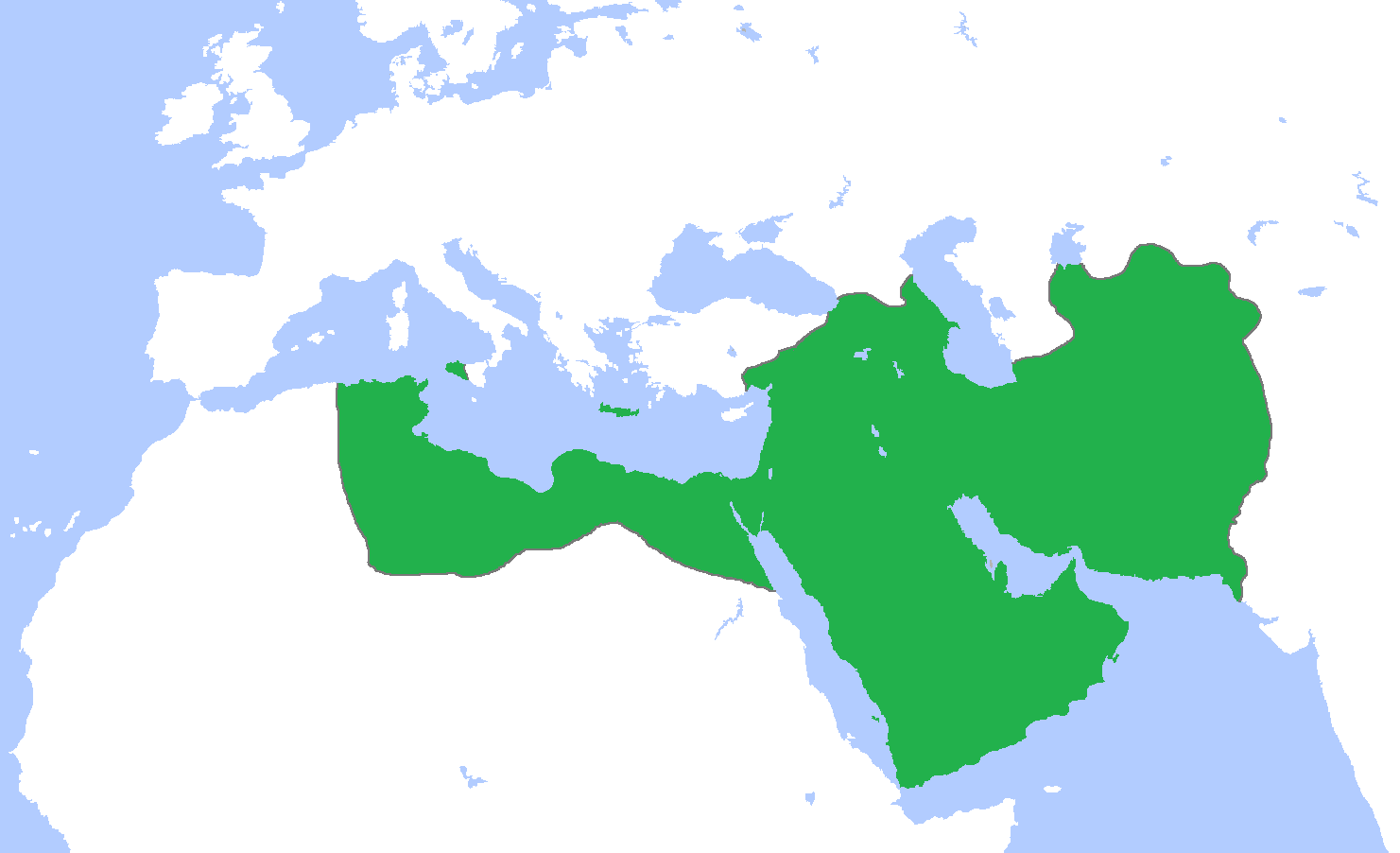
Abbasid Caliphate at its greatest extent, c. 850.

Substantial development in the pearling industry around the Qatari Peninsula occurred during the Abbasid era. Ships from Basra en route to India and China would make stops in the port of Qatar during this period. Chinese porcelain, West African coins and pieces from Thailand have been discovered in Qatar. Archaeological remains from the 9th century suggest that Qatar's inhabitants used greater wealth, perhaps from the pearl trade, to construct higher quality homes and public buildings. However, when the caliphate's prosperity declined in Iraq, so too did it in Qatar.

Most of Eastern Arabia, particularly Bahrain and the Qatari Peninsula, were sites of revolt against the Abbasid Caliphate around 868. Mohammed ibn Ali, a revolutionary, roused the people of Bahrain and Qatar into a rebellion, but the rebellion was unsuccessful, and he relocated to Basra. He was later successful in instigating the Zanj Rebellion.

A radical Isma'ili group called the Qarmatians established a utopian republic in Eastern Arabia in 899. They considered the pilgrimage to Mecca a superstition and once in control of the Bahraini state they launched raids along the pilgrim routes crossing the Arabian Peninsula. In 906, they ambushed the pilgrim caravan returning from Mecca and massacred 20,000 pilgrims.

Qatar is mentioned in 13th-century Muslim scholar Yaqut al-Hamawi's book, Mu'jam Al-Buldan (Dictionary of Countries), which alludes to the Qataris' fine striped woven cloaks and their skills in improvement and finishing of spears, known as khattiyah spears. The spears acquired their name as an homage to the region of Al-Khatt which encompassed present-day Qatif, Uqair and Qatar.

== Post-Islamic Golden Age ==
=== Usfurids and Ormus control (1253–1515) ===
Much of Eastern Arabia was controlled by the Usfurids in 1253, but control of the region was later seized by the prince of Ormus in 1320. Qatar's pearls provided the kingdom with one of its main sources of income. The Portuguese defeated the Ormus by 1507 following the destruction of their fleet by Afonso de Albuquerque's forces. However, Albuquerque's captains grew rebellious, and he was compelled to abandon the Ormus island. Ultimately, in 1515, King Manuel I killed Sultan Saifuddin's vizier Reis Hamed, pressuring the Sultan to become a vassal of King Manuel.

=== Portuguese and Ottoman control (1521–1670) ===
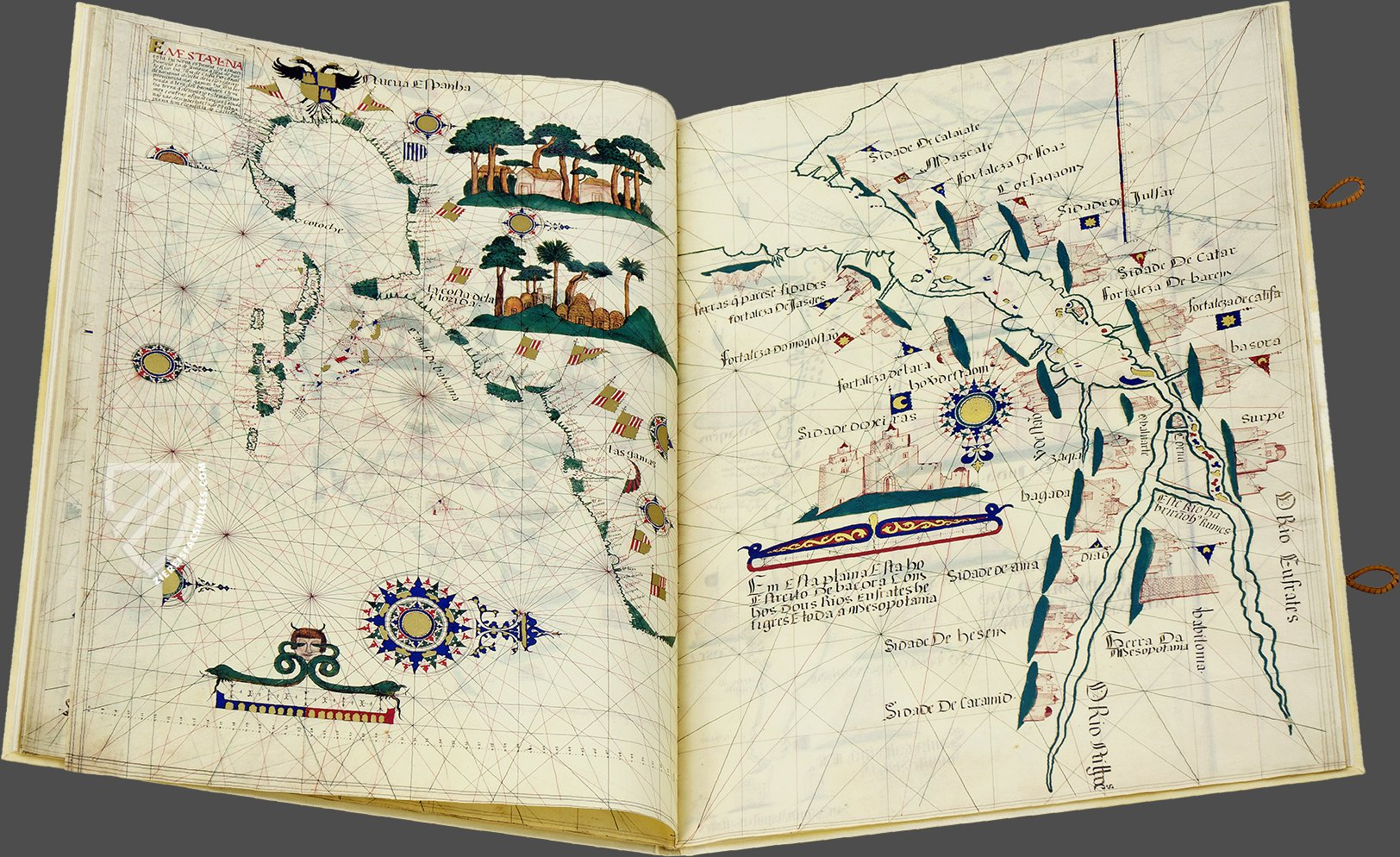
Sidade de Catar in Lázaro Luís' 1563 map of Arabia.

Bahrain and mainland Qatar had been seized by the Portuguese in 1521. After the Portuguese claimed control, they constructed a series of fortresses along the Arabian Coast. However, there have been limited findings of Portuguese ruins in Qatar. One possible contender for a Portuguese presence is the 16th-century fort built in Portuguese architectural style in the ruined town of Ruwayda. A map dating to 1563 created by Portuguese cartographer Lázaro Luís depicts Sidade de Catar, making it the earliest depiction of any specific settlement in Qatar. Some historians believe that it refers to Ruwayda, though there remains much ambiguity as to the location's true identity.

Gasparo Balbi, a Venetian merchant and traveler, made the first mention of Qatar in a print book in the West. The book, titled Viaggio dell’Indie Orientali Balbi, detailed Balbi's travels to the Far East from 1579 to 1588. In it, he mentions a place called 'Barechator', thought to be a corruption of Bar Qatar, or mainland Qatar.

The Portuguese focused on creating a commercial empire in Eastern Arabia, and exported gold, silver, silks, cloves, amber, horses and pearls. The population of Al-Hasa submitted voluntarily to the rule of the Ottomans in 1550, preferring them to the Portuguese. After the Portuguese were expelled from the area in 1602 by the Dutch and British, the Ottomans saw little need to maintain a military presence in the Al-Hasa region. As a result, the Ottomans were expelled by the Bani Khalid in 1670.

=== Rule of Bani Khalid (1670–1783) ===
Having expelled the Ottomans, the Bani Khalid held jurisdiction over Qatar from 1670 onward. In 1766, the Utub clans of Al Jalahma and Al Khalifa migrated from Kuwait to Zubarah in Qatar. By the time of their arrival in Zubarah, the Bani Khalid exercised weak power over Qatar, though the largest village was ruled by a distant relative of the Bani Khalid. After the Persian occupation of Basra in 1777 many merchants and families moved from Basra and Kuwait to Zubarah. The town became a thriving center of trade and pearling in the Persian Gulf region after this movement.

The Al Khalifa claimed Qatar and Bahrain by 1783, whereas Bani Khalid control of neighboring Al-Hasa officially came to an end in 1795.

== Al Khalifa and Saudi control (1783–1868) ==
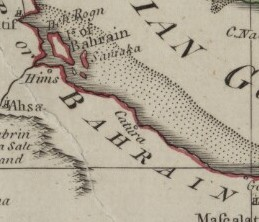
A 1794 map depicting Catura under the jurisdiction of Bahrain.

Following Persian aggression towards Zubarah, the Utub and other Arab tribes drove the Persians from Bahrain in 1783. Al Jalahma seceded from the Utub alliance sometime before the Utub annexed Bahrain in 1783 and returned to Zubarah. This left the Al Khalifa tribe in undisputed possession of Bahrain, who then transferred their power base from Zubarah to Manama. They continued to exert authority over the mainland and paid tribute to the Wahhabi to ward off challenges on Qatar. However, Qatar did not develop a centralized authority because the Al Khalifa sheikhs were primarily concerned with the affairs of Bahrain. As a result, Qatar went through many periods of 'transitory sheikhs', including Rahmah ibn Jabir al-Jalhami. By 1790, Zubarah was described as a safe haven for merchants who enjoyed complete protection and no customs duties.

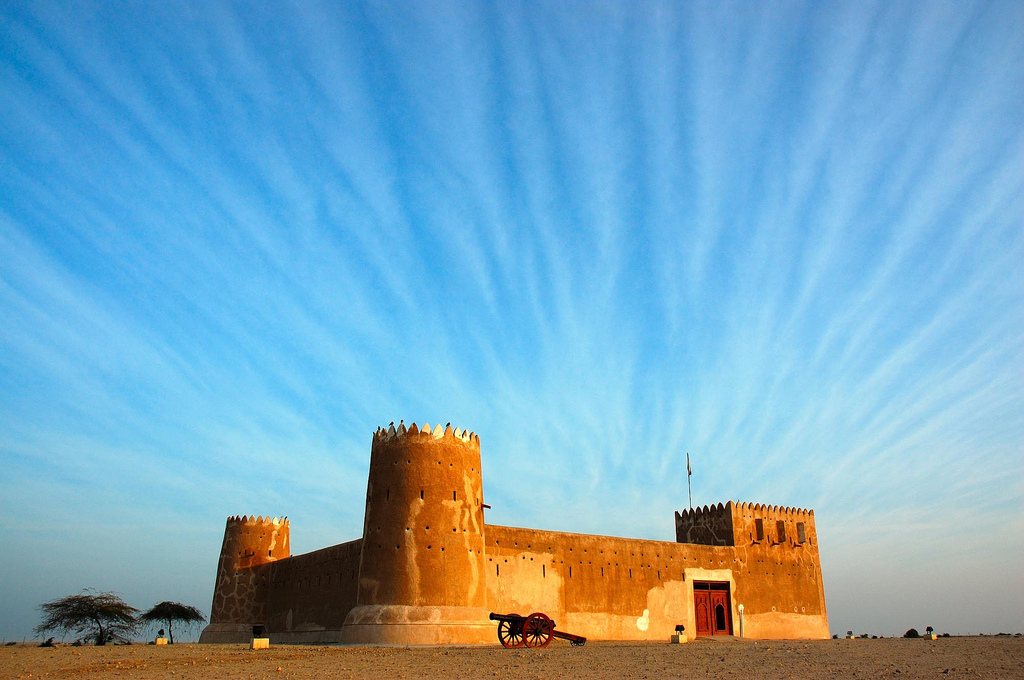
Al Zubara Fort

The town came under threat by the Wahhabi from 1780 onward due to the intermittent raids launched on the Bani Khalid strongholds in Al-Hasa. The Wahhabi thought the population of Zubarah would conspire against their regime with the help of the Bani Khalid. They also believed that its residents practiced teachings contrary to the Wahhabi doctrine and regarded the town as an important gateway to the Persian Gulf. Saudi general Sulaiman ibn Ufaysan led a raid against the town in 1787. Five years later, a massive Wahhabi force conquered Al Hasa, forcing many refugees to flee to Zubarah. Wahhabi forces besieged Zubarah and several neighboring settlements in 1794 as punishment for accommodating asylum seekers. The local chieftains were allowed to continue carrying out administrative tasks but were required to pay a tax.

After defeating the Bani Khalid in 1795, the Wahhabi were attacked on two fronts. The Ottomans and Egyptians assaulted the western front, while the Al Khalifa in Bahrain and the Omanis launched an attack against the eastern front. The Wahhabi allied themselves with the Al Jalahmah tribe in Qatar, who engaged the Al Khalifa and Omanis on the eastern frontier.

In 1811, upon being made aware of advancements by the Egyptians on the western frontier, the Wahhabi amir reduced his garrisons in Bahrain and Zubarah to re-position his troops. Said bin Sultan of Muscat capitalized on this and attacked the Wahhabi garrisons in Bahrain and Zubarah. The fort in Zubarah was set ablaze, and the Al Khalifa were effectively restored to power.

=== British involvement ===
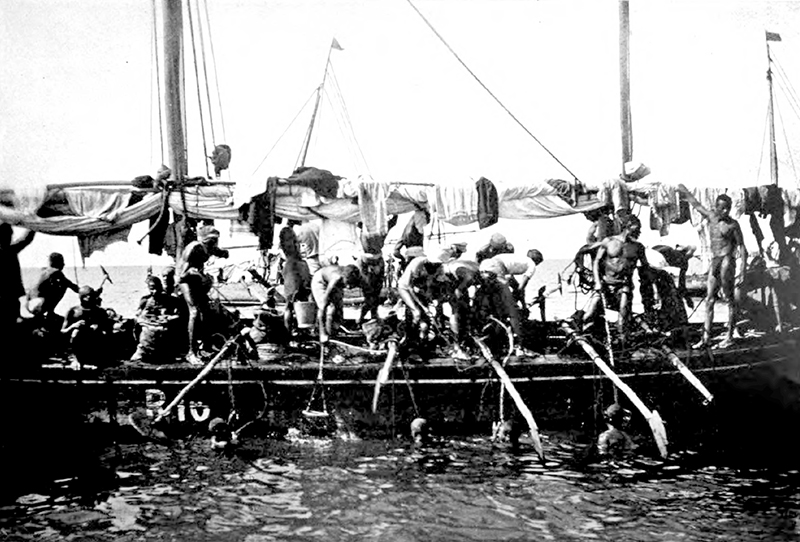
Pearl fishing in the Persian Gulf, early 20th century.

Britain's desire for secure passage for East India Company ships led it to impose its own order in the Persian Gulf. An agreement known as the General Maritime Treaty was signed between the East India Company and the sheikhs of the coastal area (later known as the Trucial Coast) in 1820. It acknowledged British authority in the Persian Gulf and sought to end piracy and the slave trade. Bahrain became a party to the treaty, and it was assumed that Qatar, as a dependency, was also a party to it.

A report compiled by Major Colebrook in 1820 gives the first descriptions of the major towns in Qatar. All of the coastal cities mentioned in his report were situated near the Persian Gulf pearl banks and had been practicing pearl fishing for millenniums. Until the late eighteenth century, all of the principal towns of Qatar, including Al Huwaila, Fuwayrit, Al Bidda and Doha were situated on the east coast. Doha developed around the largest of these, Al Bidda. The population consisted of nomadic and settled Arabs and a significant proportion of slaves brought from East Africa. As punishment for piracy committed by the inhabitants of Doha, an East India Company vessel bombarded the town in 1821. They razed the town, forcing between 300 and 400 natives to flee.

A survey carried out by the British in 1825 notes that Qatar did not have a central authority and was governed by local sheikhs. Doha was ruled by the Al-Buainain tribe. In 1828, a member of the Al-Buainain murdered a native of Bahrain, prompting the Bahraini sheikh to imprison the offender. The Al-Buainain tribe revolted, provoking the Al Khalifa to destroy their fort and expel them from Doha. The expulsion of the Al-Buainain granted the Al Khalifa greater jurisdiction over Doha.

=== Bahraini–Saudi contention ===
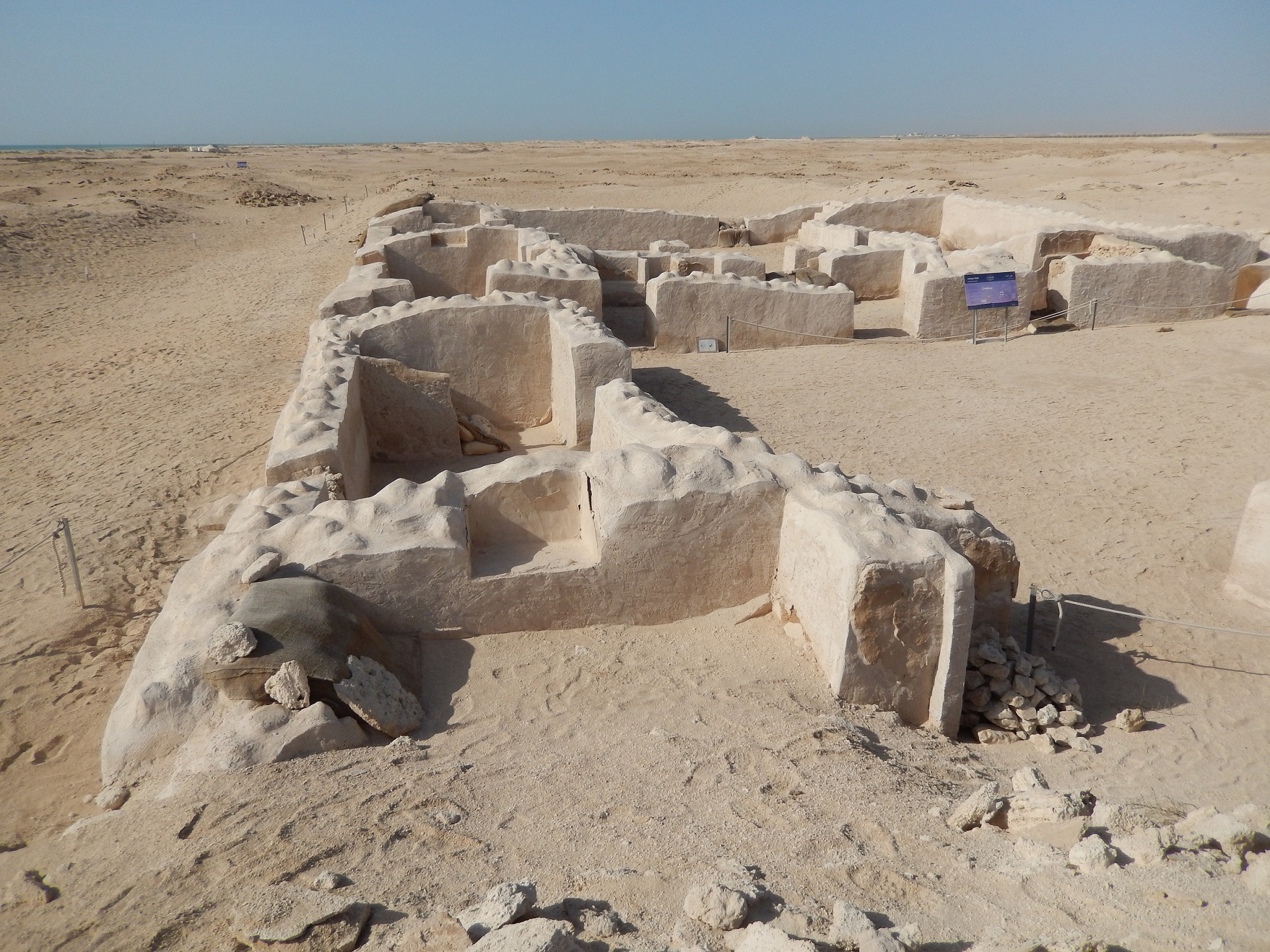
Ruined city in Zubarah.

Desiring to keep surveillance over the proceedings of the Wahhabis, Bahrain stationed a government official named Abdullah bin Ahmad Al-Khalifa on the coast of Qatar as early as 1833. Turning against the Bahrainis, he instigated the people of Al Huwailah to revolt against the Al Khalifa and open up a correspondence with the Wahhabis in 1835. Shortly after the revolt, a peace agreement was signed by both parties under the mediation of the son of the Sultan of Muscat. As part of the stipulations, Al Huwailah was demolished and its residents were moved to Bahrain. However, nephews of Abdullah bin Ahmed almost immediately violated the agreement when they incited members of the Al Kuwari tribe to attack Al Huwailah.

Residents of the peninsula were susceptible to skirmishes between the forces of the sheikh of Bahrain and the Egyptian military commander of Al-Hasa. At the end of 1839 or the beginning of 1840, the governor of Al-Hasa dispatched troops to lay waste to Qatar following the refusal of the Na'im tribe of Zubarah to pay the demanded tribute. The assassination of a governor in Hofuf prematurely ended the expedition before the forces could reach the country.

In 1847, Abdullah bin Ahmed Al Khalifa and a Qatari chief named Isa bin Tarif formed a coalition against Muhammad bin Khalifa, the ruler of Bahrain. In November, bin Khalifa landed in Al Khor with 500 troops and military support from the governors of Qatif and Al-Hasa. The opposition forces numbered 600 troops and were led by bin Tarif. On 17 November, a decisive battle, which came to be known as the Battle of Fuwayrit, took place between the coalition forces and the Bahraini forces. The coalition forces were defeated after bin Tarif and eighty of his men were killed. After he defeated the resistance troop, bin Khalifa demolished Al Bidda and moved its inhabitants to Bahrain. He sent his brother, Ali bin Khalifa, as an envoy to Al Bidda. However, he did not exercise any administrative powers, and local tribal leaders remained responsible for the internal affairs of Qatar.

Mohammed bin Thani and his tribe migrated from Fuwayrit to Al Bidda in 1848. Prior to this migration, each tribe and settlement had its independent leader, and there was no documented instance of their unification in battle. The concept of a unified land or nation was not present. However, with Mohammed bin Thani's arrival, Qatar began to gain significant economic and political weight.

In 1851, Qatar served as a flashpoint for a conflict between Faisal bin Turki, Imam of the Emirate of Najd, and Muhammad bin Khalifa. Faisal had long sought to gain control of Bahrain and had previously attempted, and failed, to invade the island. In May 1851, Faisal launched his third attempt to capture Bahrain, ordering his forces to proceed towards Al Bidda, Qatar, which was intended to be used as a staging area for an invasion of Bahrain. In response, Ali bin Khalifa, the Bahraini representative in Qatar, called on all men of fighting age to defend Al Bidda, as well as sending for help from Saeed bin Tahnun Al Nahyan of Abu Dhabi. Mohammed bin Thani served as one of the leaders of the Qatari forces.

From 2 June to 4 June 1851, the Battle of Mesaimeer was fought between Qatari-Bahraini and Wahhabi forces. On the first day, a skirmish of gunfire ensued between the Qatari-Bahraini forces and those of Faisal ibn Turki without any close combat. According to British and oral reports, the Wahhabis were routed by the allied forces on this day. On the second day, Qatari forces, led by Mohammed bin Thani's son Jassim, engaged Faisal's troops in a fierce battle while the Bahraini forces retreated to their ships, observing from the sea. On the third day, Faisal's forces retreated to their camp at Mesaimeer. Mohammed bin Thani advised Ali bin Khalifa to make peace with Faisal, fearing a renewed attack once they regrouped. This suggestion was rebuffed by Ali bin Khalifa, who perceived it as betrayal.

Shortly after the battle ended, Mohammed bin Thani negotiated a separate peace agreement with Faisal in which he agreed to be under Wahhabi governance provided that he remains chief of Al Bidda. Faisal obliged his request, leading to Muhammad bin Khalifa imposing a blockade of Al Bidda after receiving news of this. On 8 June, Qatari forces under the leadership of Mohammed bin Thani assumed control of Burj Al-Maah, a watchtower guarding Doha's main water source, close to Al Bidda Fort where the allied forces of Ali bin Khalifa and Saeed bin Tahnoun were stationed. Upon hearing the news, they fled to Bahrain without incident, much to the dismay of Faisal who admonished Mohammed bin Thani for not capturing them.

On 25 July, 1851, Saeed bin Tahnun negotiated a treaty between the Bahrainis and Wahhabis, in which the Bahrainis would pay an annual zakat to Faisal in exchange for his renouncement of any claims to Qatar and return of Al Bidda to the chieftainship of Ali bin Khalifa. Mohammed bin Thani, as party to this agreement, agreed to relinquish his position. This agreement led to Faisal's departure for Al-Hasa on 26 July, 1851. Despite the peace agreement being signed earlier, Al Bidda's blockade was only lifted on 2 August, 1851.

=== Economic repercussions ===
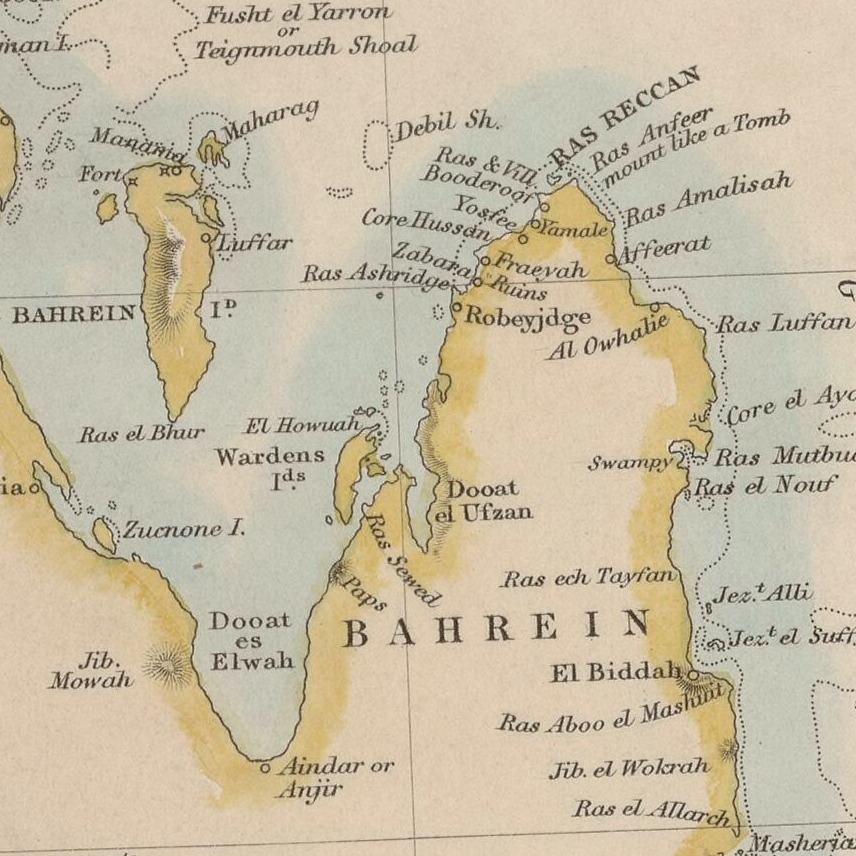
1849 map of Bahrain and present-day Qatar.

In a move which angered Mohammed bin Khalifa, Faisal bin Turki provided a safe haven for Abdullah bin Ahmed's sons in Dammam in 1852. Consequently, the Bahrainis attempted to drive away residents of Al Bidda and Doha who were suspected of being loyal to the Wahhabi by imposing an economic blockade on the inhabitants, which prevented them from engaging in pearl hunting. The blockade continued until the end of the year. In February 1853, the Wahhabi began marching from Al-Hasa to Al Khor. After Bahrain received assurance from Qatar that they would not cooperate with the Wahhabi forces if they crossed their borders, they sent Ali bin Khalifa to the mainland to act as a collaborator with the local resistance. A British-mediated peace agreement was reached between the two parties in 1853.

Hostilities were provoked again after the Bahraini sheikh, in response to the harboring of Bahraini fugitives in Dammam, stopped paying tribute to the Wahhabi amir in 1859 and proceeded to instigate Qatari tribes to attack its subjects. Following threats made by Abdullah bin Faisal Al Saud to attack Bahrain, the British navy dispatched a ship off the coast of Dammam to prevent any attacks. The situation escalated in May 1860 when Abdullah threatened to occupy the coast of Qatar until the annual tribute was paid. In May 1861, Bahrain signed a treaty with the British government in which the latter agreed to offer protection and recognize Qatar as a dependent of Bahrain. In February 1862, the treaty was ratified by the Indian government.

Following the involvement of the British, the sway that the Al Khalifa tribe held over Qatar's affairs began declining. Mohammed bin Thani was described by Gifford Palgrave as the acknowledged governor of the Qatar Peninsula in 1863. Some of Al Wakrah's inhabitants were forced to vacate the town by the Bahraini sheikh in April 1863 due to alleged links with the Wahhabi. The town's chief, Mohammed Bu Kuwara, was taken into custody on a similar charge. In 1866, a report by the British revealed that Qatar was paying an annual zakat of 4,000 German krones to the Wahhabi, in encroachment of the 1861 British treaty. The report also contended that the Al Khalifa were taxing the people of Qatar for the same annual payment.

=== Qatari–Bahraini War ===
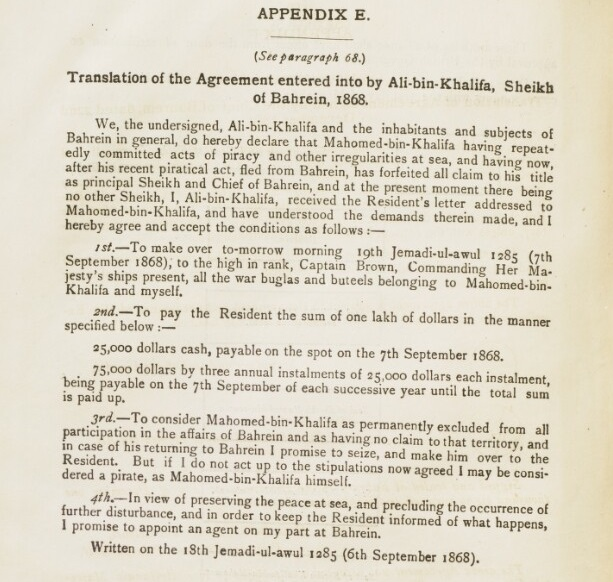
An agreement between Britain and Bahrain in September 1868 as an aftermath to the Qatari–Bahraini War.

In June 1867, Ali bin Khalifa, the Bahraini representative in Qatar and brother of Muhammad bin Khalifa, seized a Bedouin from Al Wakrah and deported him to Bahrain. Mohammed bin Thani demanded his release, but Ali bin Khalifa refused. This prompted Mohammed bin Thani to expel him from Al Wakrah. Upon receiving news of this, Muhammad bin Khalifa released the Bedouin prisoner and expressed his desire for renewed peace talks. Jassim bin Mohammed Al Thani, the son of Mohammed bin Thani, traveled to Bahrain to negotiate on his behalf. He was imprisoned upon arrival, and a large number of ships and troops were soon sent to punish the people of Al Wakrah and Al Bidda. Abu Dhabi joined on Bahrain's behalf due to the conception that Al Wakrah served as a refuge for fugitives from Oman. Later that year, the combined forces sacked the two aforementioned Qatari cities with 2,000 men in what would come to be known as the Qatari–Bahraini War. A British record later stated:

"(...) the towns of Doha and Wakrah were, at the end of 1867 temporarily blotted out of existence, the houses being dismantled and the inhabitants deported."

In either late 1867 or June 1868, the Qataris attempted to launch a counterattack against the Bahrainis, however, they were defeated in the Battle of Damsah. An account of the battle written in 1933 by C.U. Aitchison, under-secretary of the British Raj, is as follows:

As both the Bahrain and Abu Dhabi Shaikhs were bound by their engagements with the British Government to abstain from aggression of every kind by sea; to appeal to the British Resident as arbitrator; and to afford full redress for all maritime offences which could justly be charged against them or their subjects, steps were taken to exact reparation for these outrages. Before this could be effected the tribes of Qatar retaliated by an attack on Bahrain which proved unsuccessful; but in the naval action which took place a number of vessels were destroyed and great loss of life occurred.

Contemporary sources state the 1868 attack was particularly violent, in some 1,000 were killed and 60 ships were destroyed.

The aftermath of the Battle of Damsah saw the Qatari forces execute a strategic withdrawal, prompting a pursuit by Bahraini troops to the settlement of Al Wakrah. At this location, the Qatari contingent mounted a defense, successfully encircling the Bahraini forces and capturing two of their commanders. The engagement concluded with a negotiated exchange of prisoners, following which Jassim bin Mohammed returned to his seat of power in Doha.

The joint Bahraini-Abu Dhabi incursion and Qatari counterattack prompted the British political agent, Colonel Lewis Pelly, to impose a settlement in 1868. Pelly's mission to Bahrain and Qatar and the peace treaty that resulted were milestones in Qatar's history. It implicitly recognized the distinctness of Qatar from Bahrain and explicitly acknowledged the position of Mohammed bin Thani as an important representative of the Peninsula's tribes.

== Ottoman control (1871–1913) ==
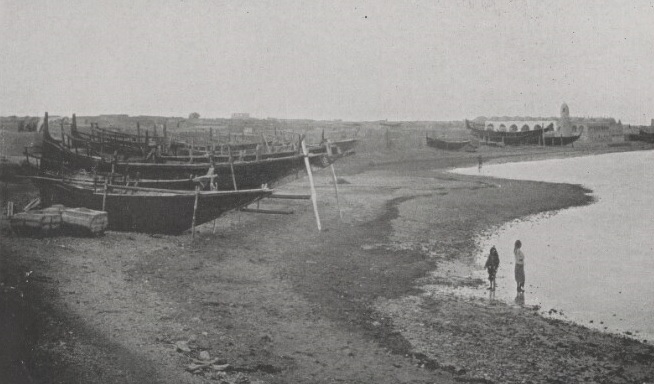
Doha in the early 20th century.

The Ottoman Empire expanded into Eastern Arabia in 1871. After establishing themselves on the Al-Hasa coast, they advanced towards Qatar. Al Bidda soon came to serve as a base of operations for Bedouins harassing the Ottomans in the south, and Abdullah II Al-Sabah of Kuwait was sent to the town to secure a landing for the Ottoman troops. He brought with him four Ottoman flags for the most influential people in Qatar. Mohammed bin Thani received and accepted one of the flags but sent it to Al Wakrah and continued hoisting the local flag above his house. Jassim bin Mohammed accepted a flag and flew it above his house. A third flag was given to Ali bin Abdul Aziz, the ruler of Al Khor.

The British reacted negatively to the Ottoman's advancements as they felt their interests were at stake. Receiving no response to their objections, the British gunboat Hugh Rose arrived in Qatar on 19 July 1871. After inspecting the situation, Sidney Smith, the assistant political resident in the Persian Gulf, discovered that Qatar flew the flags willingly. To further add to their apprehension, Jassim bin Mohammed, who assumed his father's role during this period, authorized the Ottomans to send 100 troops and equipment to Al Bidda in December 1871. By January 1872, the Ottomans had incorporated Qatar into their dominion. It was designated a province in Najd under the control of the sanjak of Najd. Jassim bin Mohammed was appointed as the kaymakam (sub-governor) of the district, and most other Qataris were allowed to keep their positions in the new government.

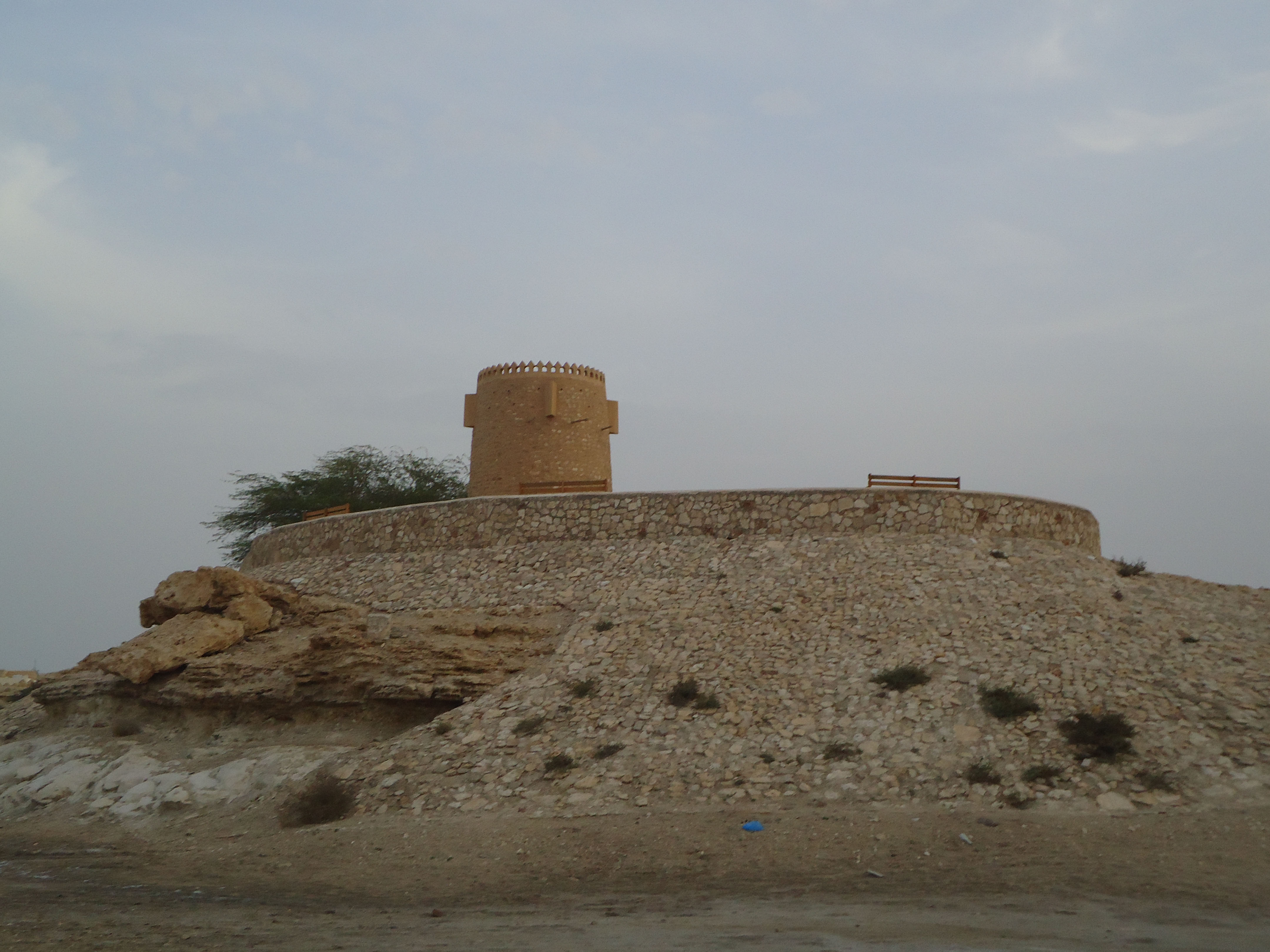
A fort in Al Khor.

Charles Grant, the assistant political resident, falsely reported that the Ottomans sent a contingent of 100 troops from Qatif to Zubarah under the command of Hossein Effendi in August 1873. The sheikh of Bahrain reacted negatively to this because the Na'im tribe, which resided in Zubarah, had signed a treaty agreeing to be his subjects. Upon being confronted by the sheikh, Grant referred him to political resident Edward Ross. Ross informed the sheikh that he believed he had no right to protect tribes residing in Qatar. In September, the sheikh reiterated his sovereignty over the town and tribe. Grant replied by arguing that there was no special mention of the Na'im or Zubarah in any treaties signed with Bahrain. A British government official concurred with his views, stating that the sheikh of Bahrain "should, as far as practicable abstain from interfering in complications on the mainland."

Another chance arose for the Al Khalifa to renew their claim on Zubarah in 1874 after an opposition leader named Nasir bin Mubarak moved to Qatar. They believed that Mubarak, with the assistance of Jassim bin Mohammed, would target the Na'im living in Zubarah as a prelude to an invasion. As a result, a contingent of Bahraini reinforcements was sent to Zubarah, to the disapproval of the British, who suggested that the sheikh was involving himself in complications. Edward Ross made it apparent that a government council decision advised the sheikh that he should not interfere in the affairs of Qatar. The Al Khalifa remained in consistent contact with the Na'im, drafting 100 members of the tribe in their army and offering financial assistance. Jassim bin Mohammed expelled some members of the tribe after they attacked ships near Al Bidda in 1878.

Despite the opposition of many prominent Qatari tribes, Jassim bin Mohammed continued to show support for the Ottomans. However, there were no signs of improvement in the partnership between the two parties, and relations further deteriorated when the Ottomans refused to aid Jassim in his expedition of Abu Dhabi-occupied Khor Al Adaid in 1882. In addition, the Ottomans supported the Ottoman subject Muhammad bin Abdul Wahhab Al Faihani, who was the sheikh of the semi-autonomous settlement of Al Ghariyah and who attempted to supplant Jassim bin Mohammed in 1888.

=== Qatari–Abu Dhabi War ===
During the period of Ottoman influence, Qatar was involved in a protracted conflict known as the Qatari–Abu Dhabi War. This series of territorial disputes and military conflicts occurred between Qatar, led by Jassim bin Mohammed Al Thani, and the Emirate of Abu Dhabi, under Zayed bin Khalifa Al Nahyan, from 1881 to 1893. The conflict was rooted in longstanding territorial disputes over poorly defined borders, competition for control of resources such as grazing lands and pearl banks, and the secession of the Qubaisat tribe from Abu Dhabi to Qatar in 1869. It was further complicated by allegations of piracy in disputed territories and the broader imperial rivalry between the Ottoman Empire and Britain in the Gulf region.

The war began with early skirmishes in 1881, including the battles of Baynunah, Suwaihan, and Al-Marsaf. Tensions escalated over the following years, with both sides engaging in raids and counter-raids. A significant incident, commonly known as the Second Destruction of Doha, occurred in August 1888 when Abu Dhabi forces attacked Doha, resulting in numerous casualties including the death of Jassim's son, Ali bin Jassim.

The conflict reached its climax with the Battle of Khannour from January to February 1889. Jassim, with limited Ottoman support, mobilized a coalition of tribal forces to capture the fort of Khannour in Abu Dhabi territory after a 20-day siege. Following this, Qatari forces conducted extensive raids across Abu Dhabi territory, reaching as far as Al Ain and Al Buraimi.

After years of hostilities and diplomatic maneuvering, the conflict was finally resolved in 1893 through an agreement jointly brokered by the British and Ottomans. This war marked an important phase in Qatar's transition towards independence and its emergence as a distinct political entity in the Gulf region, even while nominally under Ottoman rule. The conflict also reinforced British dominance in the region while exposing the limits of Ottoman influence.

=== Battle of Al Wajbah ===
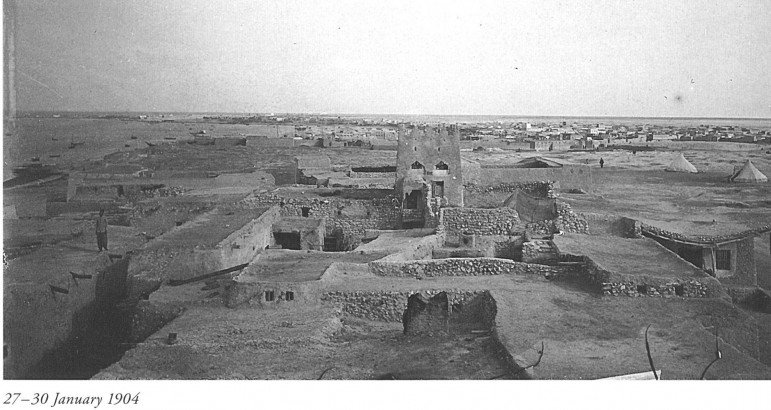
Old city of Doha, January 1904.

In February 1893, Mehmed Hafiz Pasha arrived in Qatar to seek unpaid taxes and accost Jassim bin Mohammed's opposition to proposed Ottoman administrative reforms. Fearing that he would face death or imprisonment, Jassim bin Mohammed moved to Al Wajbah (16 km (10 mi) miles west of Doha); he was accompanied by several tribe members. Mehmed demanded that he disband his troops and pledge his loyalty to the Ottomans. However, Jassim bin Mohammed remained adamant in his refusal to comply with Ottoman authority. In March 1893, Mehmed imprisoned his brother, Ahmed bin Mohammed Al Thani, in addition to 13 prominent Qatari tribal leaders on the Ottoman corvette Merrikh. After Mehmed declined an offer to release the captives for a fee of ten thousand liras, he ordered a column of approximately 200 Ottoman troops to advance towards Jassim bin Mohammed's fortress in Al Wajbah under the command of Yusuf Effendi.

Shortly after arriving at Al Wajbah, Effendi's troops came under heavy gunfire by Qatari infantry and cavalry troops, which totaled 3,000 to 4,000 men. They retreated to Shebaka fortress, where they once again sustained casualties from a Qatari incursion. After they retreated to the fortress of Al Bidda, Jassim bin Mohammed's advancing column besieged the fortress and cut off the neighborhood's water supply. The Ottomans conceded defeat and agreed to relinquish the Qatari captives in return for the safe passage of Mehmed Pasha's cavalry to Hofuf by land. Although Qatar did not gain full independence from the Ottoman Empire, the result of the battle forced a treaty that would later form the basis of Qatar emerging as an autonomous country within the empire.

=== Later Ottoman presence ===
On the cusp of Ottoman withdrawal from the Peninsula in 1915, the British government wrote the following description of the Ottoman presence in Qatar:

"The Qatar Peninsula, to the east of the island of Bahrain, is ruled by Shaikh ’Abdullah bin Jasim, a rich and powerful chief, who has a following of about 2,000 fighting men. Some few years ago his father was engaged in hostilities with the Turks, who succeeded, after some hard fighting, in establishing a garrison in the fort of Al Bida’ (Dohah) on the eastern side of the peninsula and in reducing Jasim to nominal subjection. He is now styled qaim-maqam of the peninsula under the Porte, and flies the Turkish flag, but he dislikes his rulers and would be glad to be rid of them. The Bani Hajar tribes can muster about 4,500 fighting men, which with the Shaikh’s 2,000, would give altogether 6,500; but 4,500 represents as large a force as he is ever likely to bring together. Since about 1900 various attempts have been made by the Porte to assert its sovereignty in other parts of the Qatar peninsula, and in 1910 Turkish mudirs were to be despatched to Zubarah, Odaid, Wakrah, and Abu ’Ali Island. His Majesty’s Government, however, protested against this, and, indeed, have never acknowledged Turkish rule in Qatar. In 1913 Turkey consented to remove her garrison from Qatar; but that agreement has not yet been signed, hence the garrison remains.

The Turkish garrison lives in the fort of Al Bida’, which is in the centre of the town and a little back from the sea. The garrison consists of, at the most, 100 infantry and there are said to be 12 gunners in charge of two old guns. There is an outpost of eight Turkish soldiers in a tower, over the well of Mushairib, about a mile from the fort.

Shaikh Abdullah, who succeeded to the chiefship of Qatar in 1913, is friendly towards the British, and afraid of Bin S’aud. He would no doubt be glad to be rid of the Turks."

== British protectorate (1916–1971) ==
The Ottomans officially renounced sovereignty over Qatar in 1913, and in 1916, the new ruler Abdullah bin Jassim Al Thani signed a treaty with Britain, thereby instating the area under the trucial system. This meant that Qatar relinquished its autonomy in foreign affairs, such as the power to cede territory, and other affairs, in exchange for Britain's military protection from external threats. The treaty also had provisions suppressing slavery, piracy, and gunrunning, but the British were not strict about enforcing those provisions.

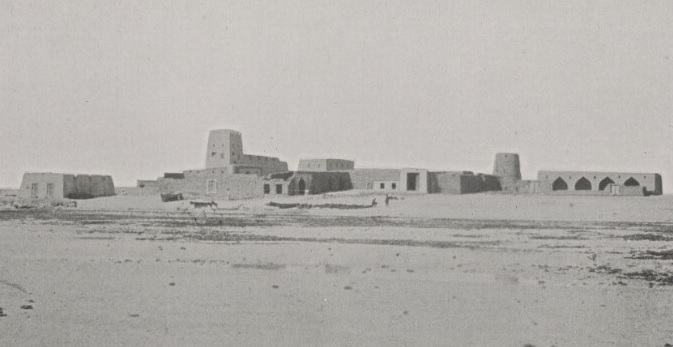
Al Wakrah Fort in 1908.

Despite Qatar coming under British protection, Abdullah bin Jassim's position was insecure. Uncooperative tribes refused to pay tribute; disgruntled family members intrigued against him; and he felt vulnerable to the designs of Bahrain and the Wahhabi. The Al Thani were merchant princes, reliant on trade and especially the pearl trade, and dependent on other tribes to do their fighting for them, primarily the Bani Hajer who owed their allegiance to Ibn Saud, amir of the Najd and Al-Hasa. Despite numerous requests by Abdullah bin Jassim for strong military support, weapons, and a loan, the British were reluctant to become involved in inland affairs. This changed in the 1930s when competition for oil concessions in the region intensified.

=== Oil drilling ===
The scramble for oil raised the stakes in regional territorial disputes and signified the need to establish territorial borders. The first move came in 1922 at a boundary conference in Uqair when prospector Major Frank Holmes attempted to include Qatar in an oil concession he was discussing with Ibn Saud. Sir Percy Cox, the British representative, saw through the ploy and drew a line on the map separating the Qatar Peninsula from the mainland. The first oil survey took place in 1926 under the direction of George Martin Lees, a geologist contracted to the Anglo-Persian Oil Company (APOC), but no oil was found. The oil issue rose again in 1933 after an oil strike in Bahrain. Lees had already noted that, in such an eventuality, Qatar should be investigated again. After lengthy negotiations on 17 May 1935, Abdullah bin Jassim signed a concession agreement with Anglo-Persian representatives for a period of 75 years in return for 400,000 rupees on signature and 150,000 rupees per annum with royalties. As part of the agreement, Great Britain made more specific promises of assistance than they had in earlier treaties. APOC transferred the concession to the IPC subsidiary company Petroleum Development (Qatar) Ltd. to meet its obligations under the Red Line Agreement.

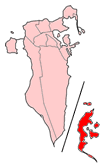
Hawar Islands (shown in red). Not to scale.

Bahrain claimed rule over a group of islands between the two countries in 1936. The largest island was Hawar Islands, situated off the west coast of Qatar, where the Bahrainis had established a small military garrison. Britain accepted the Bahraini claim over Abdullah bin Jassim's objections, largely because the Bahraini sheikh's personal British adviser was able to phrase their case in a legal manner familiar to British officials. In 1937, the Bahrainis again laid claim to the deserted town of Zubarah after being involved in an armed conflict between Abdullah bin Jassim and the Na'im tribe. Abdullah bin Jassim sent a large, heavily armed force and defeated the Na'im. The British political resident in Bahrain supported Qatar's claim and warned Hamad ibn Isa Al Khalifa, the ruler of Bahrain, not to intervene militarily. Indignant over the loss of Zubarah, Hamad ibn Isa imposed a crushing embargo on trade and travel to Qatar.

Drilling of the first oil well began in Dukhan in October 1938, and over a year later, the well struck oil in the Upper Jurassic limestone. Unlike the Bahraini strike, this was similar to Saudi Arabia's Dammam field discovered three years before. Production was halted between 1942 and 1947 because of World War II and its aftermath. The disruption of food supplies caused by the war prolonged a period of economic hardship in Qatar, which began in the 1920s with the collapse of the pearl trade and was exacerbated in the early 1930s with the onsets of the Great Depression and the Bahraini embargo. As was the case in previous times of privation, entire families and tribes moved to other parts of the Persian Gulf, leaving many Qatari villages deserted. Abdullah bin Jassim went into debt and groomed his favored second son, Hamad bin Abdullah Al Thani, to be his successor in preparation for his retirement. However, Hamad bin Abdullah's death in 1948 led to a succession crisis in which the main candidates were Abdullah bin Jassim's eldest son, Ali bin Abdullah Al Thani, and Hamad bin Abdullah's teenage son, Khalifa bin Hamad Al Thani.

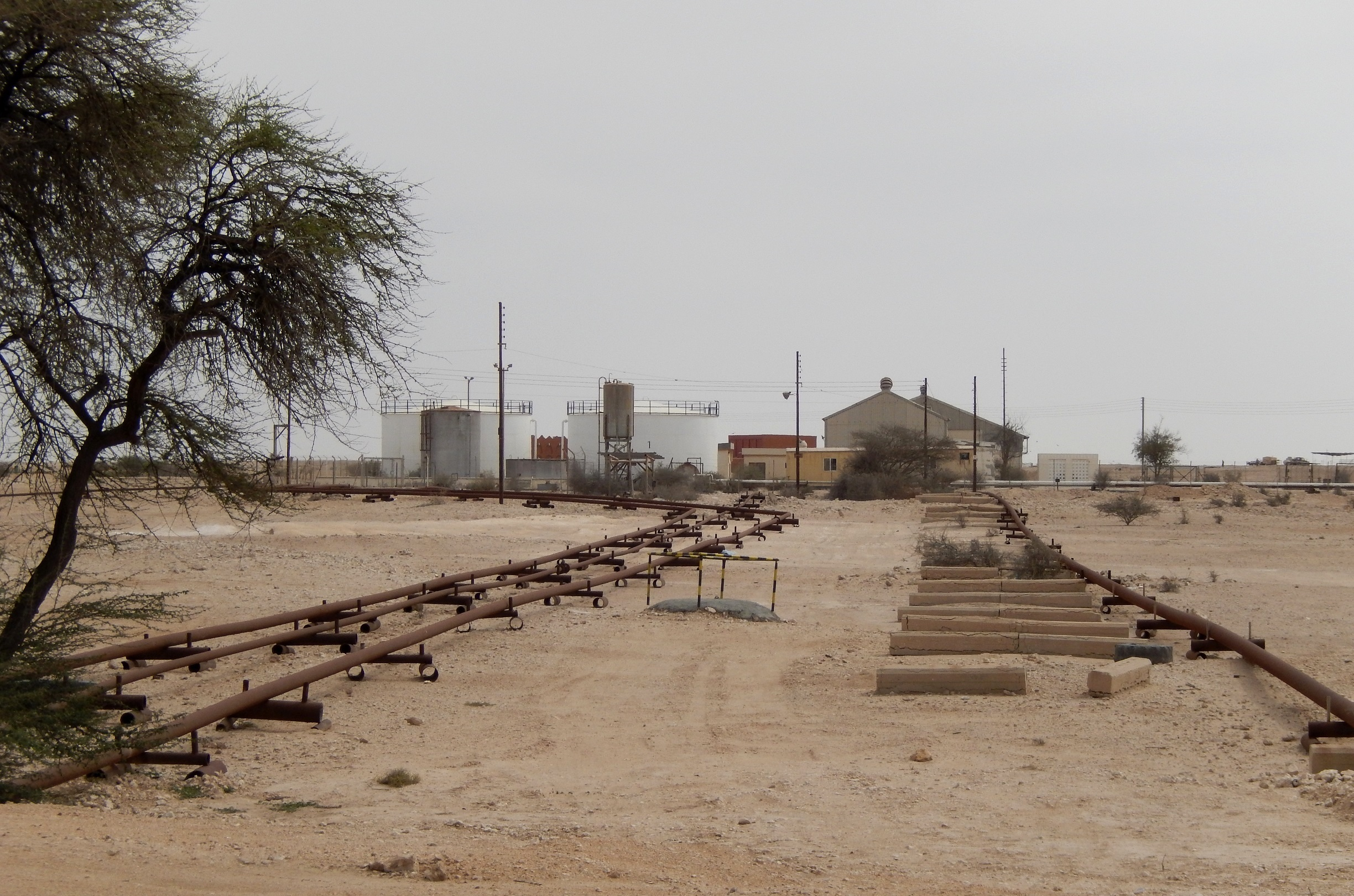
An old oil installation in north-west Qatar.

Oil exports and payments for offshore rights began in 1949 and marked a turning point in Qatar. The oil revenues would dramatically transform the economy and society and would also provide the focus for domestic disputes and foreign relations. This became apparent to Abdullah bin Jassim when several of his relatives threatened armed opposition if they did not receive increases in their allowances. Aged and anxious, Abdullah bin Jassim turned to the British. He promised to abdicate and agreed to an official British presence in Qatar in exchange for recognition and support of Ali bin Abdullah as ruler in 1949.

Under British tutelage, the 1950s saw the development of government structures and public services. Ali bin Abdullah was at first reluctant to share power, which had centered in his household, with an infant bureaucracy run and staffed mainly by outsiders. Ali bin Abdullah's increasing financial difficulties and inability to control striking oil workers and difficult sheikhs led him to succumb to British pressure. The first official budget was drawn up by a British adviser in 1953. By 1954, there were forty-two Qatari government employees.

=== Protests and reforms ===
Large numbers of protests against the British and the ruling family occurred during the 1950s. One of the largest took place in 1956; it drew 2,000 participants, most of whom were high-ranking Qataris allied with Arab nationalists and dissatisfied oil workers. During another protest which took place in August 1956, the participants waved Egyptian flags and chanted anti-colonialism slogans. In October 1956, protesters tried to sabotage oil pipelines in the Persian Gulf by destroying the pipelines with a bulldozer. These were major impetuses to the development of the British-run police force which was established by the British in 1949. The demonstrations led Ali bin Abdullah to invest the police with his personal authority and support. This was a significant reversal of his previous reliance on his retainers and Bedouin fighters.

Public services developed slowly during the 1950s. The first telephone exchange opened in 1953, the first desalination plant in 1954, and the first power plant in 1957. A dock, a customs warehouse, an airstrip, and a police headquarters were also built in this period. In the 1950s, 150 adult males of the ruling family received grants from the government. Sheikhs also received land and government positions. This mollified them as long as oil revenues increased. However, when revenues declined in the late 1950s, Ali bin Abdullah could not handle the family pressures this engendered. Discontent was fueled by his residence in Switzerland, extravagant spending, and hunting trips in Pakistan, especially among those who were excluded from the regime's largesse (non-Al Thani Qataris) and among other branches of Al Thani who desired more privileges. Seniority and proximity to the Sheikh determined the size of allowances.

Succumbing to family pressures and poor health, Ali bin Abdullah abdicated in 1960. Instead of handing power over to Khalifa bin Hamad, who had been named heir apparent in 1948, he made his son, Ahmad bin Ali, ruler. Nonetheless, Khalifa bin Hamad gained considerable power as heir apparent and deputy ruler, in large part because Ahmad bin Ali spent much time outside the country. One of his first acts was to increase funding for the sheikhs at the expense of development projects and social services. In addition to allowances, adult male Al Thani were given government positions. This added to the anti-regime resentment already felt by, among others, oil workers, low-ranking Al Thani, dissident sheikhs, and some leading government officials. These individuals formed the National Unity Front in response to a fatal shooting of a protester on 19 April 1963 by one of Sheikh Ahmad bin Ali's nephews. While the Saudi monarch was at the ruler's palace on 20 April 1963, a demonstration occurred in front of the building. Police fired and killed three demonstrators, prompting the National Unity Front to organize a general strike on 21 April. The strike lasted around two weeks with most public services affected.

The group made a statement that week where it listed 35 of its demands to the government entailing less authority for the ruling family; protection for oil workers; recognition of trade unions; voting rights for citizens and the Arabization of the leadership. Ahmed bin Ali rejected most of these demands and moved to arrest and detain fifty of the most prominent National Unity Front members and sympathizers without trial in early May. The government also instituted some reforms in response to the movements. This included the provision of land and loans to poor farmers, instituting a policy of preferential hiring of Qatari citizens, and the election of a municipal council.

The infrastructure, foreign labor force, and bureaucracy continued to grow in the 1960s, largely under the instruction of Khalifa bin Hamad. There were also some early attempts at diversifying Qatar's economic base, most notably with the establishment of a cement factory, a national fishing company, and small-scale agriculture. An official gazette was first published in 1961, and in 1962, a nationality law was introduced. No cabinets existed during this period, however, British and Egyptian advisers helped establish a number of governmental departments, such as the Department of Agriculture and a Department of Labor and Social Affairs.

=== Federation of nine Emirates ===
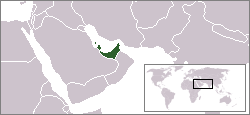
The proposed federation of Arab emirates.

In 1968, Britain announced its plans to withdraw its military commitments east of Suez (including those in force with Qatar) in the following three years. Because of the Persian Gulf sheikhdoms' vulnerability and small size, the rulers of Bahrain, Qatar and the Trucial Coast contemplated forming a federation after the British withdrawal. The federation was first proposed in February 1968, when the rulers of Abu Dhabi and Dubai announced their intention to form a coalition, extending an invitation to other Gulf states to join. Later that month, in a summit meeting attended by the rulers of Bahrain, Qatar, and the Trucial Coast, the government of Qatar proposed the formation of a federation of Arab emirates to be governed by a higher council composed of nine rulers. This proposal was accepted and a declaration of union was approved. There were, however, several disagreements between the rulers on matters such as the location of the capital, the drafting of the constitution, and the distribution of ministries.

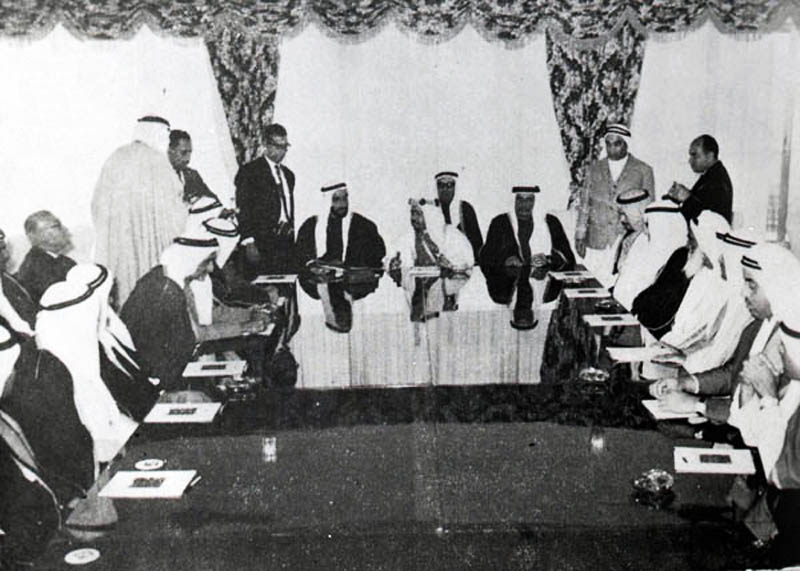
The first conference on the Federation of Emirates, held in Abu Dhabi, 1968.

The rulers remained divided on multiple issues despite Khalifa bin Hamad's election as chairman of the Temporary Federal Council in July 1968 and the establishment of numerous ministries. Two opposing blocs surfaced soon after the initial proposal, with Qatar and Dubai aligning together to oppose the inclinations of Bahrain and Abu Dhabi. Bahrain, being backed by Abu Dhabi, made efforts to marginalize the other rulers' roles in the union in an attempt to assume a leadership role and thus gain political leverage over their long-standing territorial disputes with Iran. The last meeting occurred in October 1969 when Zayed Al Nahyan and Khalifa bin Hamad were elected the first president and prime minister of the federation, respectively. There were stalemates on numerous issues during the meeting, including the position of vice president, the defense of the federation, and whether a constitution was required. Shortly after the meeting, the Political Agent in Abu Dhabi revealed the British government's interests in the outcome of the session, prompting Qatar and Ras al Khaimah to withdraw from the federation over perceived foreign interference in internal affairs. The federation was consequently disbanded despite efforts by Saudi Arabia, Kuwait, and Britain to reinvigorate discussions.

Ahmad bin Ali subsequently promulgated a provisional constitution in April 1970, which declared Qatar an independent Arab Islamic state with the Sharia as its basic law. Khalifa bin Hamad was appointed prime minister in May. The first Council of Ministers was sworn in on 1 January 1970; seven of its ten members were Al Thani. Khalifa bin Hamad's argument prevailed with regard to the federation proposal.

== Independence (1971–present) ==
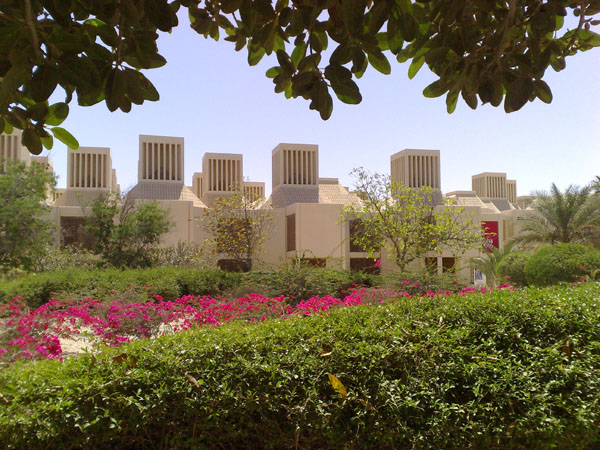
Qatar's first university was opened in 1973.

Qatar declared its independence on 1 September 1971 and became an independent state on 3 September. When Ahmad bin Ali issued the formal announcement from his Swiss villa instead of from his palace in Doha, many Qataris were convinced that it was time for a change in leadership. On 22 February 1972, Khalifa bin Hamad deposed Ahmad bin Ali whilst he was on a hunting trip in Iran. Khalifa bin Hamad had the tacit support of Al Thani and Britain, as well as the political, financial, and military support of Saudi Arabia. In contrast to his predecessor's policies, Khalifa bin Hamad cut family allowances and increased spending on social programs, including housing, health, education, and pensions. In addition, he filled many top government posts with close relatives.

In October 1973, the Arab oil embargo precipitated a sharp rise in global crude prices, which quadrupled over the course of the six-month restriction, creating what became known as the first oil shock. The surge in revenue brought significant economic changes to oil-exporting states, including Qatar. A second oil crisis followed in 1979, again driving up prices and leading to fuel shortages in consumer markets. Regional instability deepened with the outbreak of the Iran–Iraq War in 1980. The conflict prompted most Persian Gulf states, including Qatar, to provide financial assistance to Iraq. In response to perceived security threats, particularly from post-revolutionary Iran, the Gulf Cooperation Council (GCC) was established in 1981, bringing together Qatar and five other Arab states of the Persian Gulf in a collective framework for diplomatic coordination.

In 1991, Qatar played a significant role in the Gulf War, particularly during the Battle of Khafji, in which Qatari tanks rolled through the streets of the town and provided fire support for Saudi Arabian National Guard units which were engaging Iraqi Army troops. Qatar allowed coalition troops from Canada to use the country as an airbase to launch aircraft on CAP duty and also permitted air forces from the United States and France to operate in its territories.

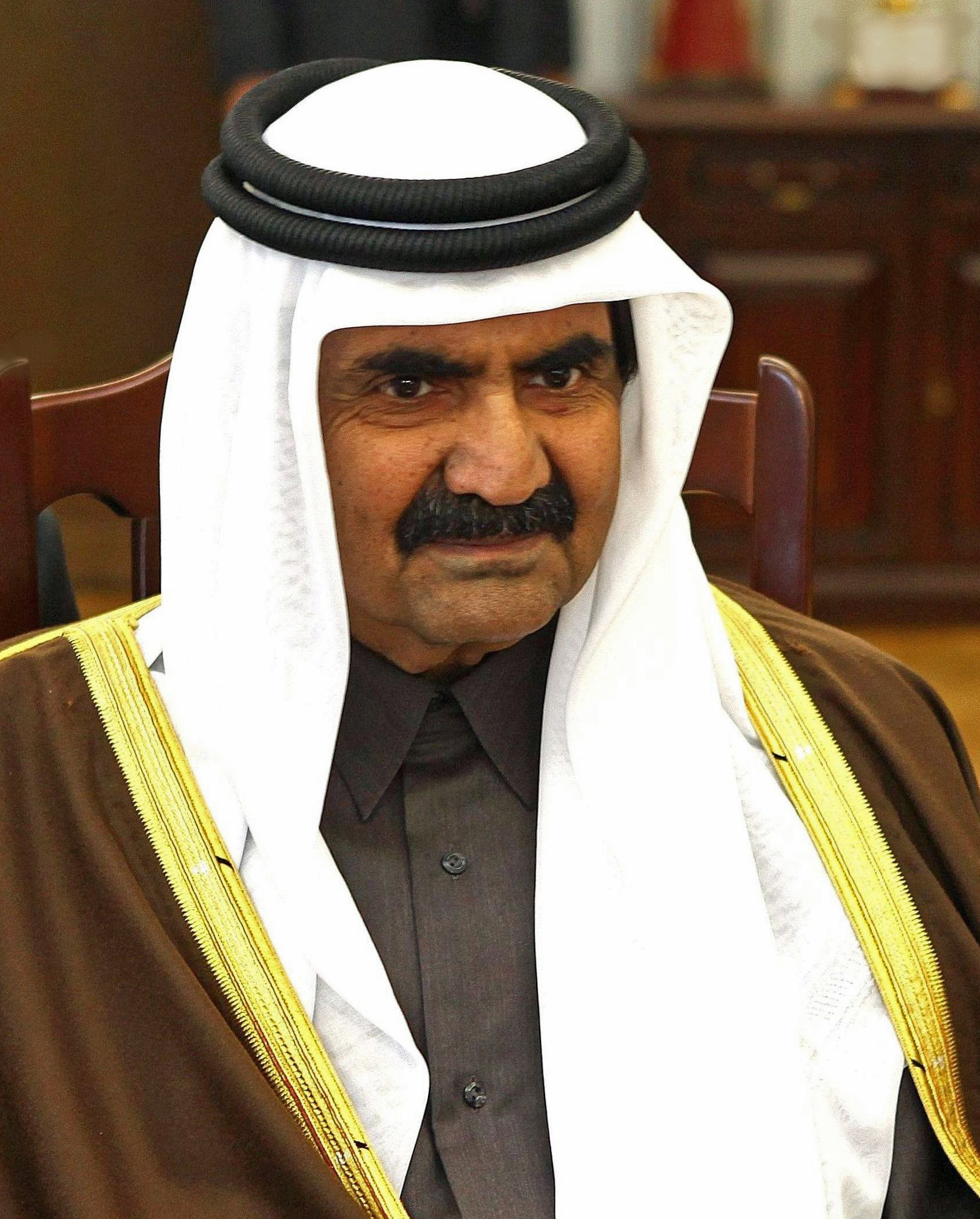
Hamad bin Khalifa Al Thani

In 1993, Khalifa bin Hamad remained the emir, but his son, Hamad bin Khalifa, the heir apparent and minister of defense, had taken over much of the day-to-day running of the country. The two consulted with each other on all matters of importance. On 27 June 1995, Hamad bin Khalifa deposed his father in a bloodless coup. An unsuccessful counter-coup was staged in 1996, and is believed by Qatari officials to have been supported by the leadership of Qatar's traditional allies, the UAE and Saudi Arabia. The Emir announced his intention for Qatar to move toward democracy and permitted more liberal press, establishing media network Al Jazeera in 1996. He issued a decree specifying the electoral process of the Central Municipal Council (CMC) in 1998, and in 1999 the first CMC elections were held. A new constitution was approved via public referendum in April 2003 and enacted in June 2005. Economic, social, and democratic reforms occurred in the following years. In 2003, a woman was appointed to the cabinet as minister of education.

Qatar and Bahrain had disputes over the ownership of Hawar Islands since the mid-20th century. In 2001, the International Court of Justice awarded Bahrain sovereignty over Hawar Islands while allotting Qatar sovereignty over smaller disputed islands and the Zubarah region in mainland Qatar. During the trial, Qatar provided the court with 82 forged documents to substantiate their claims of sovereignty over the territories in question. These claims were withdrawn at a later stage after Bahrain discovered the forgeries.

In 2003, Qatar served as the US Central Command headquarters and one of the main launching sites of the invasion of Iraq. In March 2005, a suicide bombing killed a British teacher at the Doha Players Theatre, shocking the country, which had not previously experienced acts of terrorism. The bombing was carried out by Omar Ahmed Abdullah Ali, an Egyptian resident in Qatar who had suspected ties to Al-Qaeda in the Arabian Peninsula. In June 2013, Sheikh Hamad Bin Khalifa stepped down as emir and transferred leadership to his son and heir Sheikh Tamim bin Hamad Al Thani.

As a means to manage the revenue gained from LNG sales, the Qatar Investment Authority was established in 2005. In 2008, the government launched Qatar National Vision 2030, which provides a framework for Qatar's long-term development as well as identifying threats and solutions.

=== Arab Spring and military involvement (2010–2017) ===
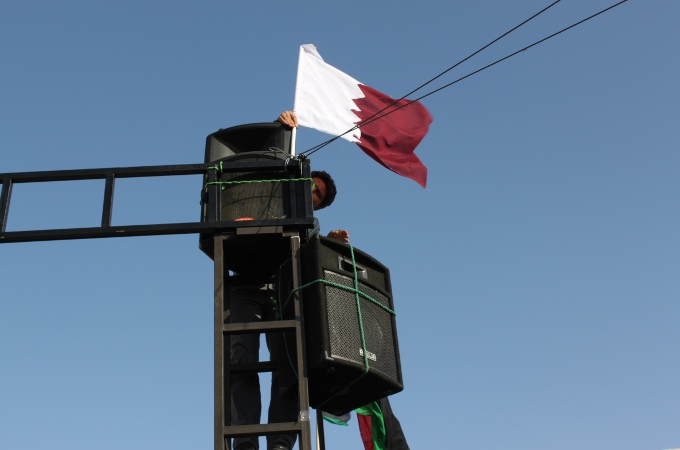
The flag of Qatar being hoisted in Libya during the civil war.

Qatar played a role in the revolutionary wave of demonstrations, protests, and civil wars in the Arab world collectively known as the Arab Spring. Having shifted from its traditional diplomatic role as a mediator, Qatar moved to support several transitional states and upheavals in the Middle East and North Africa.

During the initial months of the Arab Spring, the country's most extensive media network, Al Jazeera, helped mobilize Arab support and shaped the narratives of protests and demonstrations. Qatar sent hundreds of ground troops to support the National Transitional Council during the 2011 Libyan civil war. The troops were primarily military advisers, and were sometimes labelled as "mercenaries" by the media. Qatar also participated in the aerial campaign alongside several other coalition members.

Qatar has taken a proactive role in the Syrian civil war, which began in the Spring of 2011. In 2012, Qatar announced they would begin arming and bankrolling the opposition. It was further reported that Qatar had funded the Syrian rebellion by "as much as $3 billion" over the first two years of the civil war.

In March 2014, in protest of Qatar's alleged involvement in financing factions and political parties in ongoing Middle Eastern conflicts, Saudi Arabia, the UAE and Bahrain recalled their ambassadors to Qatar. The three countries returned their ambassadors in November of that year after an agreement was reached.

Beginning in 2015, Qatar has participated in the Saudi-led intervention in the Yemeni civil war against the Houthis and forces loyal to former President Ali Abdullah Saleh, who was deposed in the aftermath of the Arab Spring uprisings.

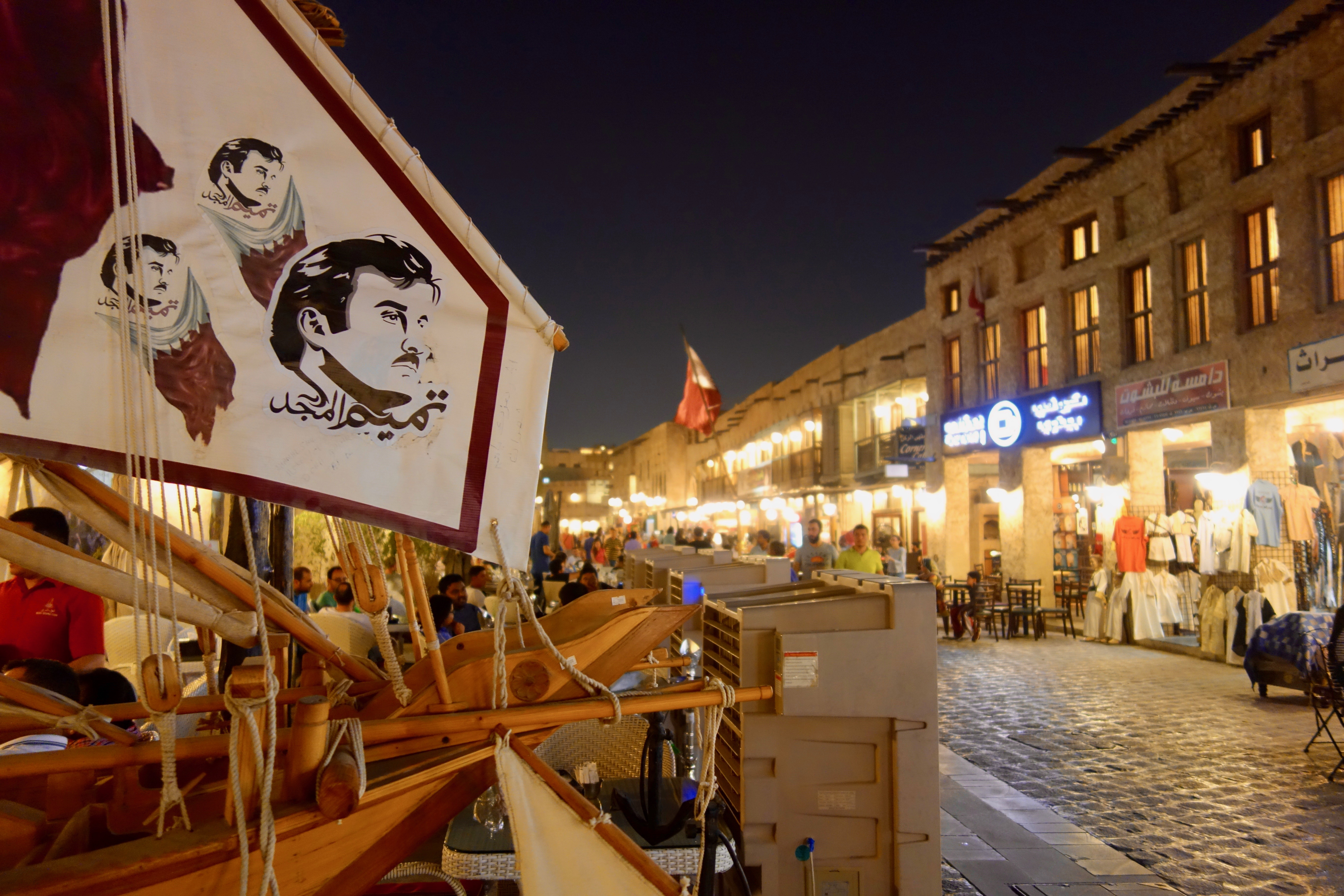
The Tamim Almajd illustration (pictured here at Souq Waqif) has become a symbol of Qatari resistance during the Qatar diplomatic crisis.

=== Diplomatic crisis (2017–2021) ===
On 5 June 2017, several countries led by Saudi Arabia, the UAE, Bahrain and Egypt (collectively referred to as the 'Quartet') severed ties with Qatar and enacted several punitive measures, such as closing air, land and sea borders to Qatar. Saudi Arabia also halted Qatari involvement in the ongoing war in Yemen. The Quartet justified their actions by alluding to alleged Qatari ties to 'terrorist groups' in the region. On 5 January 2021, almost four years after the beginning of the incident, it was announced that the two parties reached an agreement in a deal brokered by Kuwait and the United States.

== See also ==
- Emir of Qatar
- History of Asia
- History of the Middle East
- List of wars involving Qatar
- Politics of Qatar

== Bibliography ==
- Rahman, Habibur (2006). The Emergence Of Qatar. Routledge. ISBN 978-0710312136.
- Casey, Paula; Vine, Peter (1991). The heritage of Qatar (print ed.). Immel Publishing. ISBN 978-0907151500.
- Zahlan, Rosemarie Said (1979). The creation of Qatar (print ed.). Barnes & Noble Books. ISBN 978-0064979658.
