= Bahrain and its Dependencies =

Bahrain and its Dependencies البحرين وتوابعها al-Baḥrayn wa Tawābi‘uha
- 1783–1971
- Left: Flag (1932–1971); Right: Flag (1820–1932)

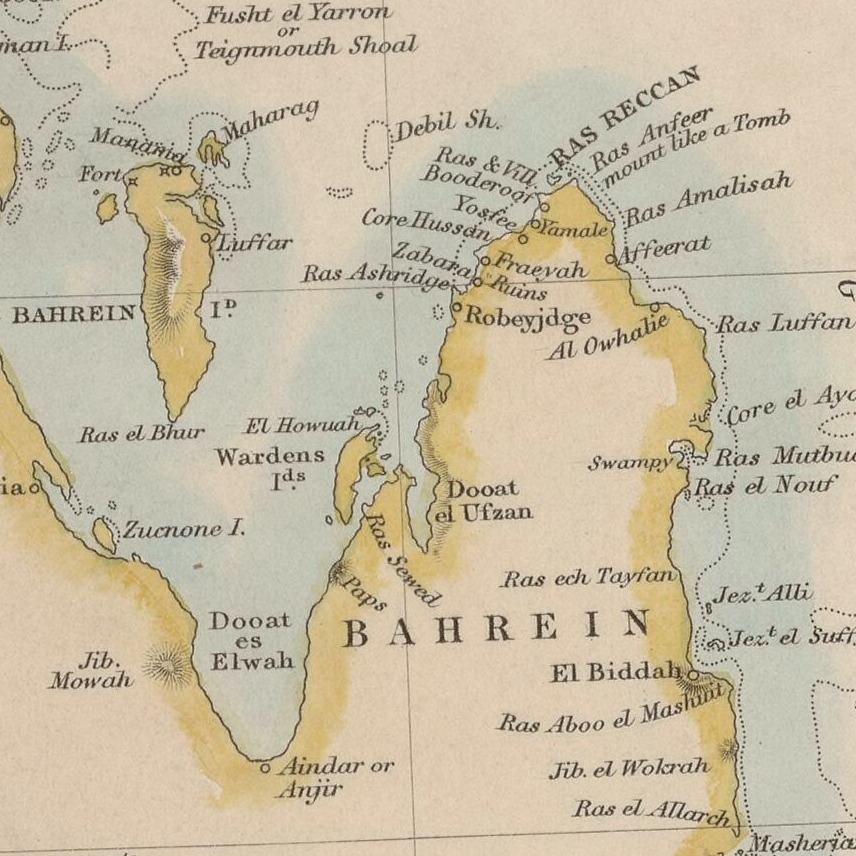
- Territory controlled by Bahrain in 1849
- Status: Protected state of the United Kingdom (1861–1971)
- Capital: Muharraq (1783–1921) Manama (from 1921)
- Common languages: Arabic
- Religion: Islam
- Government: Authoritarian absolute monarchy under a caretaker government
- Hakim
  - 1783–1796: Ahmed ibn Muhammad ibn Khalifa
  - 1961–1971: Isa bin Salman Al Khalifa
- Chief Political Resident
  - 1861–1862: James Felix Jones
  - 1970–1971: Geoffrey Arthur
- Historical era: Early modern period Cold War
  - Established: 23 July 1783
  - British protected state: 31 May 1861
  - Qatari–Bahraini War: 1867–1868
  - Independence: 15 August 1971

Population
  - 1941: 89,970
  - 1959: 143,135
  - 1971: 216,078
- Currency: British Indian rupee (19th century–1947) Indian rupee (1947–1959) Gulf rupee (1959–1965) Bahraini dinar (1965–1971)
- ISO 3166 code: BH
Preceded by	Succeeded by
Zand Iran	State of Bahrain; Qatar
- Today part of: Bahrain; Qatar

Bahrain and its Dependencies covers the history of Bahrain from the Bani Utbah invasion—led by Al Khalifa—in 1783 until the nation's independence from the British Empire in 1971. The term "Dependencies" historically referred to the shifting territorial governance of the ruling family over the Bahraini archipelago and portions of the Qatar peninsula.

Prior to the invasion, Bahrain was a dependency of Zand Iran under the governance of Nasr Al-Madhkur. Once Ahmed bin Muhammad Al Khalifa established his family's rule, the new dynasty spent nearly a century constantly fighting to defend it. The islands were briefly under the occupation of the Sultanate of Muscat and the Emirate of Diriyah following back-to-back invasions, while both the Ottomans and Qajars kept trying to claim the territory as their own. To secure their position, the Al Khalifa signed major maritime agreements with the British Empire, notably the General Maritime Treaty of 1820 and the Perpetual Truce of 1861, which recognized the dynasty as the legitimate rulers of Bahrain.

In 1867, a war erupted between Bahrain and Qatar, leading to British intervention and independence of Qatar from Bahrain. The British appointed a new Al Khalifa ruler, Isa bin Ali. During Isa's reign (1869–1923), there were no external challenges to the country as Britain defended it. He and his family enjoyed absolute powers, ruling over people as subjects and controlling much of the country as feudal estates. The public revenue of the country, collected then mostly as taxes and rents was the ruler's private income. The ruler used a special militant group to execute his orders via physical coercion. The backbone of the economy was palm cultivation, fishing and pearl diving. Palm cultivation, which the Shia practiced, was tightly controlled by Al Khalifa. Control over pearl diving on the other hands was relaxed, as it was controlled by the Sunni tribes who kept a high level of autonomy and resisted intervention. The Shia power came from their jurists who had strong social power combined with large assets.

In the end of the nineteenth century, Britain placed Bahrain under its protection and by the end of the First World War tightened its grip on the island. Starting from 1919, successive British political agents began implementing reform plans. The reforms of the twenties as they became known were administrative in nature. The Shia supported them, while the Sunni tribes and parts of the ruling family opposed them. Many petitions and counter petitions were submitted to various British officials. The country was divided and violence erupted from the opposing faction. The British intervened and replaced the ruler with his elder son, Hamad bin Isa, who supported the reforms. The reforms included the pearl industry, private properties, judicial system, policing system and education. In 1932, oil was discovered, leading to significant economical and social changes in the island. Pearl industry and palm cultivation were soon wiped out due to oil growing industry.

== Rise of Al Khalifa ==
Al Khalifa, a Sunni family allied under the Bani Utbah tribe, settled in Al Zubarah (Qatar) in 1766 after moving to it from Kuwait. Originally, their ancestors were expelled from Umm Qasr in Iraq by the Ottomans due to their predatory habits of preying on caravans in Basra and trading ships in the Shatt al-Arab waterway. The Turks exiled them to Kuwait in 1716 where they remained until 1766.

Around the 1760s, Al Khalifa migrated to Zubarah in modern-day Qatar. The Al Jalahma family, allied under the Bani Utbah tribe, soon joined Al Khalifa in Zubarah, leaving Al Sabah as the sole proprietors of Kuwait.

However, they disagreed later on the distribution of revenues, leading Al Jalahma to move to Ar Ru'ays, just east of Zubarah. Al Khalifa attacked them there and killed their chief Jaber Al Jalahma.

== Rule of Al Khalifa (1783–1869) ==
Ahmed's reign (1783–96) was stable and peaceful during which pearl production and trade grew significantly. However, during the next 75 years, Al Khalifa rule in Bahrain faced serious external and internal threats. Nonetheless, by allying with their enemies against each other, they managed to keep the island under their control.

=== External challenges ===
In 1796, Wahhabis occupied Al Zubara following their capture of Al-Hasa the year earlier. The defeated Salman bin Ahmed who succeeded his father moved to Jaww in the eastern coast of Bahrain, later moving to Riffa where he built an impressive fort. In 1799, ruler of Muscat, Oman launched an attack on Bahrain, but failed to control it. The next year he launched another attack, this time successful and appointed his son to supervise the island. In 1801, Al Khalifa, who fled to Al Zubara retook control over Bahrain, taking advantage of Omani fleet absence. The Omanis retaliated the next year, only to get defeated. Wahhabis, who supported Al Khalifa against Oman, placed Bahrain under their protection between 1803 and 1809 and direct control in 1810.

As soon as the Wahhabis were weakened by the Egyptian advance in 1811, Al Khalifa announced their alliance with Oman and paid tribute to it for two years. Then, when Oman was weakened after their defeat by Al Qawasim, Al Khalifa announced their autonomy. Al Jalahma's leader Rahmah bin Jabir, based in Khor Hassan opposed Al Khalifa who he held a deep grudge against. He pirated their ships and supported their enemies until he was killed in 1826 in a dramatic battle. In 1820, representatives of the British Empire - then the dominant power in the region - signed a "General Treaty of Peace" with tribal chiefs including Al Khalifa. By signing this treaty, the British recognized Al Khalifa as the "legitimate" rulers of Bahrain, but they also gave Persia a claim over Bahrain, which it kept invoking until Bahrain's independence in 1971.

During that period it was Oman, not Persia, that was the main external threat to Bahrain: between 1816 and 1828 they launched four military campaigns to Bahrain, all failed with the last costing them devastating losses. During the reign of Muhammad bin Khalifa (1843–68), threats to Bahrain came from the Wahhabis, Ottomans and Persians. Muhammad tried to appease both the Ottomans and Persians by pretending to support both of them simultaneously. For the Wahhabis, he used military action, which Britain opposed and offered in secret to defend Bahrain. When Muhammad refused to stop his campaign, Britain directly intervened, besieging his war fleet and forcing him to call off the attack.

In 1847, Faisal bin Turki, Imam of Najd, attempted to intervene in Bahrain, exploiting internal conflicts within the ruling family. Although unsuccessful in capturing Bahrain, he settled for a peace agreement that included a tribute payment. Faisal's inability to seize Bahrain was, in part, due to the firm stance of the British government against Saudi expansion in the Persian Gulf. The British, who had substantial interests in the region, closely monitored Faisal's movements. Their support for Muhammad bin Khalifa and their strategic positions in the Gulf influenced the broader regional dynamics.

However, in 1850, Muhammad began not to pay the tribute, and next year he attempted to get support from the Ottomans, but his attempt was not fruitful. In May 1851, Faisal launched his third attempt to capture Bahrain, ordering his forces to proceed towards Al Bidda, Qatar, which was intended to be used as a staging area for an invasion of Bahrain, preparing for a confrontation with Muhammad bin Khalifa. In response, Ali bin Khalifa, the Bahraini representative in Qatar, called on all men of fighting age to defend Al Bidda, as well as sending for help from Saeed bin Tahnun Al Nahyan of Abu Dhabi. This culminated in the Battle of Mesaimeer, taking place from 2–4 June, 1851. Although the resistance was initially successful in repelling the invasion, Ali bin Khalifa's forces later retreated to their ships. Shortly after the fighting had taken place, Mohammed bin Thani, an influential tribal leader in Al Bidda, pursued a separate peace agreement with Faisal and agreed to his governance, a move seen as a betrayal by the Bahrainis. Upon receiving news of this, Muhammad bin Khalifa ordered a naval blockade of Al Bidda in June 1851. He also sent Hamad bin Mohammed Al Khalifa to inform British political resident Samuel Hennell of his concerns of a joint Wahhabi-Qatari invasion of Bahrain and requested protection, stating that he was willing to be a British subject in exchange for such protection. The British originally rejected this proposition.

Upon further analysis of the situation, Justin Sheil, a high-ranking British diplomat in Persia, concluded that Faisal bin Turki's control of the Qatari Peninsula would be detrimental to British interests as it would provide the Ottoman Empire with an opportunity to incorporate Bahrain under its aegis in the event of a joint Qatari-Wahhabi invasion of the island. Thus, on 1 July, Hennel directed multiple British warships to be sent to protect Manama Harbor in Bahrain. He then separately wrote letters to Faisal bin Turki and Mohammed bin Thani, warning them against launching a naval invasion of the Bahraini coast. The conflict pacified when, facing pressure from multiple sides and fearing further erosion of Bahraini influence, Muhammad bin Khalifa agreed to a peace settlement. This agreement, brokered by Saeed bin Tahnun of Abu Dhabi on July 25, 1851, required Bahrain to pay an annual sum of 4,000 German krones to Faisal bin Turki as zakat. In return, Faisal agreed to restore the fort of Al Bidda to Bahraini control and to cease interference in Qatar.

The British blockade ended with the signing of the Perpetual Truce of Peace and Friendship in 1861, by which the ruler of Bahrain was not to engage in "prosecution of war, piracy and slavery at sea" and Britain was to provide protection. Britain then eliminated all external threats against Bahrain; they bombarded Wahhabis in Dammam, and used diplomacy to neutralize Persian and Ottoman ambitions.

=== Internal challenges ===
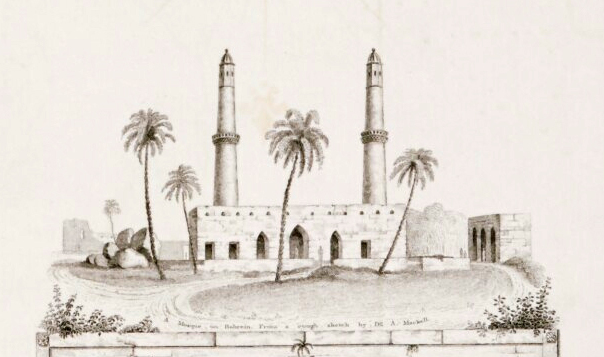
Elevation drawing of a mosque in Bahrain, 1825.

Al Khalifa held Bahrain as feudal estates and an occupied territory; they imposed taxes on local population to collect as much revenue as possible, with special focus on the Shia population. Al Khalifa initiated a series of land and property confiscation, and destruction of local sources of strength that lasted to the early 1930s. The Shia, who claim to be the indigenous population of Bahrain speak of an ideal past before invasion of Al Khalifa in which an assembly of Shia jurists would elect a smaller assembly which would in turn elect a council of three. Khuri (1980) mentions that it is very hard to either support or reject their assertion regarding the council of jurists, because documentation is lacking, but argues that it could be a "mythical reaction to their physical and social agonies during and after the conquest [of Al Khalifa]".

Once external threats were reduced in 1828 following Oman's heavy loss, the Al Khalifa became engaged in a series of internal conflicts among themselves. These conflicts caused more damage to Bahrain economy and society than that of external invasions, the Shia suffered most of which. Soon after Al Khalifa arrived to Bahrain, they became divided into two factions, one led by Salman bin Ahmed based in Bahrain mainland and the other led by his brother Abdulla based in Muharraq Island. Gradually, Muharraq became almost independent, having its own tribal administration. Khalifa bin Salman succeeded his father in 1826. Khalifa's death in 1834 escalated the internal conflict as his uncle, Abdulla became the sole ruler of Bahrain.

Abdulla's reign (1834–43) was full of conflicts and wars that caused much chaos for Bahrain; its trade declined to half and many locals, especially the Shia were forced to emigrate to other ports such as Al-Muhammarah due to the oppressive extortion and looting they were subjected to. In 1835, Abdulla ruthlessly crushed an uprising in Qatar led by one of his sons and supported by Al Bin Ali and Al Buainain. In 1842, he entered a conflict with his grandnephew, Muhammad bin Khalifa, who fled to Riyad following his defeat. Muhammad, now supported by Wahhabis moved to Al Zubara where he made allies with Al Jalahma and Al Bin Ali. With his brother Ali in Manama, they defeated Abdulla, who then fled to Dammam. Between 1844 and 1846, Abdulla launched three failed attempts to reclaim the throne from various locations, before finally leaving to Muscat where he died in 1849.

In 1867, an uprising erupted in Wakra and Doha in Qatar. Muhammad, seeking to gain time invited Jassim Al Thani of Doha to Bahrain for negotiations, but arrested him upon his arrival. In October of the same year, he declared war on Qatar. The British considered this a violation of Perpetual Truce of Peace and Friendship and sent their troops to Bahrain. Muhammad fled to Qatar, leaving his brother Ali as ruler of Bahrain, who then surrendered to British demands of giving up their war vessels and paying a fine of $100,000. In addition, Al Khalifa had to renounce claims of sovereignty of Qatar, which was recognized by Britain as a separate entity. Muhammad returned to Bahrain after his brother convinced the British to allow him in, however they soon deported him to Kuwait after accusing him of engaging in conspiracies.

Muhammad made his way to Qatif, and with the help of Nasir bin Mubarak bin Abdulla and Muhammad bin Abdulla they were able to place the latter as ruler after Ali bin Khalifa was killed in battle. Two months later, in November 1869, the British navy intervened, under the command of Colonel Lewis Pelly, and took control of the island. Ringleaders, except for one were exiled to Mumbai (previously known as Bombay). The British then, after talks with chiefs of Al Khalifa, appointed the 21 years old Isa bin Ali as the ruler of Bahrain, a position he would hold until 1923. From this point till independence, security and foreign relations of Bahrain were in complete control of the British.

== Economy and administration during reign of Isa bin Ali (1869–1923) ==
The management of economic resources as well as government and tribal sovereignty was in the hand of tribal councils (Arabic: المجالس), which were not regulated by standardized law or procedures. Social and personal affairs were managed by religious courts (Arabic: القضاء الشرعي). Each council power was derived from the economic resources which it controlled. During the period, the economy of Bahrain depended on pearl diving, fishing and palm cultivation. These settings existed long before the reign of Isa bin Ali, however they were well represented during it.

World War I disrupted elements of Bahrain's politics, society, economy and trans-regional networks.

=== Ruler's authority ===
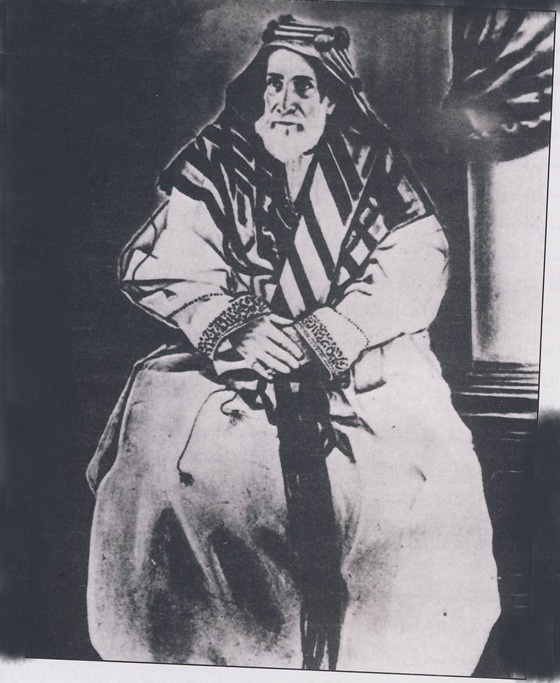
A portrait of Isa ibn Ali Al Khalifa, date unknown.

Unlike regular tribal councils, the ruler had a supreme council known as diwan and used physical coercion to collect tax or whatever they wanted from people. In the words of Khuri (1980) the ruler was "the 'government' without offices, the 'administration' without bureaucracy [and] the 'state' without public delegation or consent, standardized law or equity." The autonomy of the ruler was not much different in terms of quality from that of other sheikhs (members of Al Khalifa family) who controlled an estate, except that he had higher quantity of resources and assets. The Ruler controlled all ports and markets, and many estates including Manama and Muharraq, the two largest cities of the country. The administration apparatus at Manama and Muharraq was headed by a high ranking fidawi known as emir and composed of thirty other fidawis. In Riffa, where Sunni Arab tribes lived, the emir was an Al Khalifa member.

There was no distinction between the ruler's private income and public revenue, instead all public revenues including taxes and rentals were considered private earnings of the ruler. Much of the revenue was spent on ruler's retinue and so little or none at all on infrastructure such as schools and roads, and when it occurred, it was thought of as a personal act of charity. Distant relatives of the ruler were assigned to manage his estates and his brothers and sons were given their own estates in order to avoid internal conflicts. Government-related jobs were exclusive to the Sunnis whereas market-related were confined to the Shia and foreigners. The ruler and most sheikhs lived in Muharraq city and none lived in the Shia villages. Their fidawis and council members followed them wherever they lived.

Fidawis were the military arm of the authority; their main job was to execute sheikhs orders via physical coercion. They were composed of Baluchis, African slaves and Sunni Arabs whose tribal origin could not be traced. They had sticks and were authorized to interrogate, arrest and punish those deemed wrongdoers. Fidawis arbitrary way of handling law and order was complained about by Bahrainis. Fidawis were also responsible for claiming forced labor, known as sukhra (Arabic: السخرة) in which they would round up a random group of adult males from public places such as the market and then assign them using force to a specific task. The men would not be freed until they complete the task, which usually did not require skillful labor and could be finished in no more than two days (e.g. construction).

=== Palm cultivation and estate administration ===
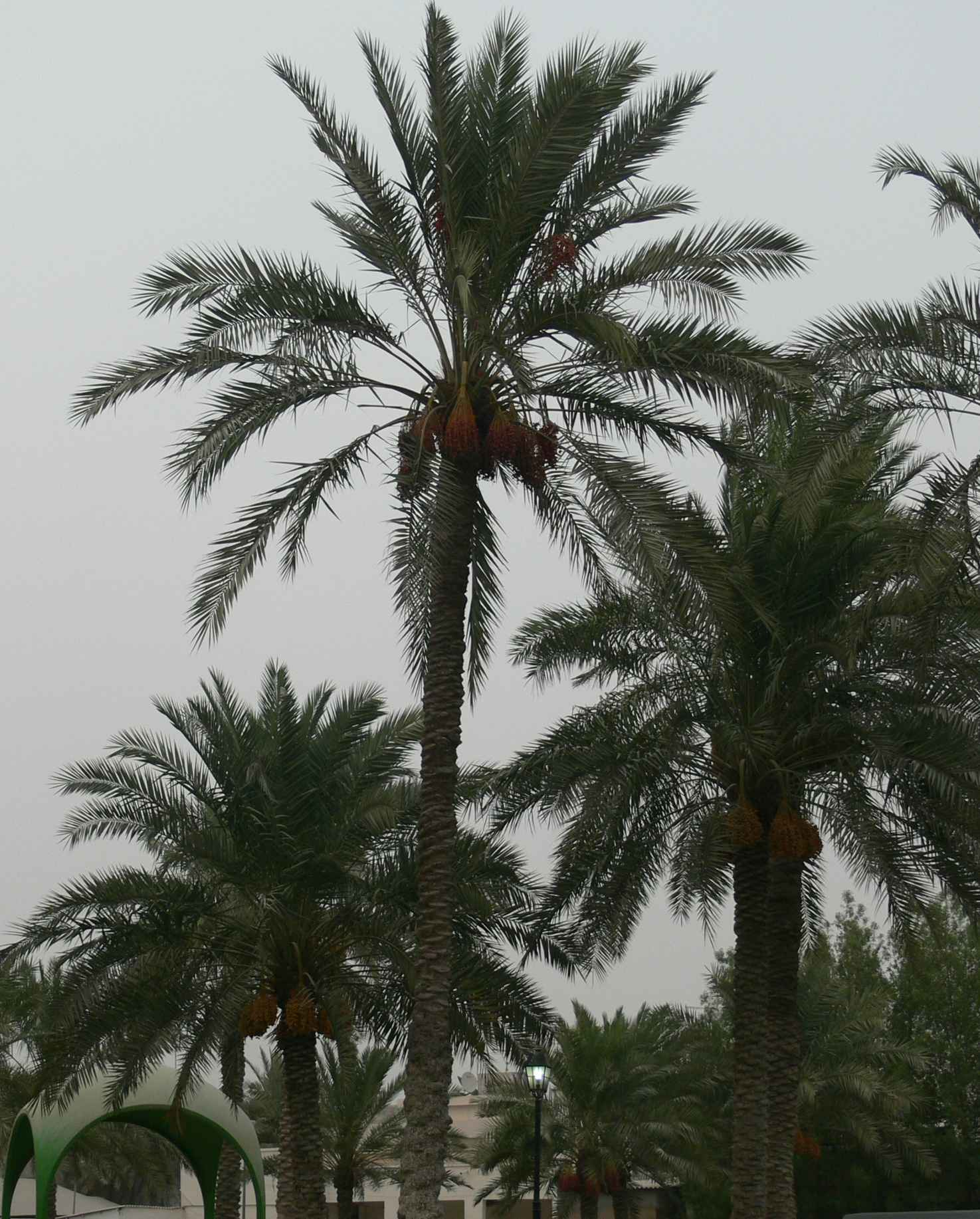
Palm cultivation used to be one of two backbones of the Bahraini economy.

Most cultivation in Bahrain was confined to palm trees; vegetables and fodder were only grown in small amounts. Palms were mainly located in the northern shores which compromised the cultivable land in the island. Unlike the pastoral nomads of central Arabia who lived off the camel, Bahrainis lived off the palms; its dates were a basic in their diet, branches used for construction of houses and fish traps, flowers and buds for medicine and leaves for making baskets. Local culture was also deeply affected by palms; many stories, songs, myths and even classification of persons revolved around them. Cultivation of palms required full-day work during all sessions of the year. Most cultivators were Shia who engaged all members of their families in the job: children and adults, male and female. It was their only source of subsistence.

Palm cultivation was tightly controlled by the ruling family, who also served as landlords; on one hand, the lands they directly administered were farmed out as fiefs and on the other they collected taxes on private lands, and confiscated the property of those who failed to pay. Only Shia had to pay taxes, as they were not a part of the army, despite never being invited to join it. Land was divided into a number of estates which were administered by sheikhs, mostly brothers and sons of the ruler. The size of each estate was not fixed; it increased or decreased based on the power and influence of its owner; the closer relation to ruler's line of descent, the more power and thus larger estates. For instance, when a ruler died, management of estates would shift from his brothers and sons to the brothers and sons of the new ruler, and the new ruler's cousins would not inherit their fathers' (brothers of the previous ruler). Mothers also played an important factor, especially if they belonged to the ruling family.

Sheikhs who controlled an estate enjoyed a high level of autonomy within it, almost as high as the ruler himself; they imposed taxes, resolved disputes and protected their subjects against outsiders, including members of Al Khalifa family. They did not interact with farmers directly, rather they had a wazir who would rent palm gardens via some middlemen, then to individual farmers. A wazir, which means minister in Arabic, is a Shia trusted by the sheikh. Sometimes wazirs would act as special advisers of the sheikh.

As well as wazirs, sheikhs' administration included kikhda and fidawis. Kikhda were Shia assigned to collect taxes. Due to the nature of their job, wazirs and kikhda, who lived in Shia villages, had a leading position in society, but in villages that were heavily taxed such as Bani Jamra and Diraz, they were so hated that they escaped to Manama following reforms of the 1920s. In total, there were two to five individuals between the sheikh and the farmer. Contracts were oral before the reforms of the 1920s, after which they were written down. Rents were dependent on yield, increasing and decreasing with it, which meant farmers were always left with no more than the essentials of survival.

=== Fishing ===
Bahrain waters are rich in fish of various types. Fish had no capital value (not imported or exported), thus fishing traps, the main method of fishing in the island were not controlled by Al Khalifa. Most Bahrainis had one thing or another to do with fishing and sea, which they knew about as much as northern Arabs knew about camel and desert. Specialized fishermen known as rassamin built fishing traps and rented them for U.S. $150 to $5000 a year with the most expensive in Sitra island. The ruling family owned a small percentage of fishing traps, while Shia owned most of them.

=== Pearl diving ===
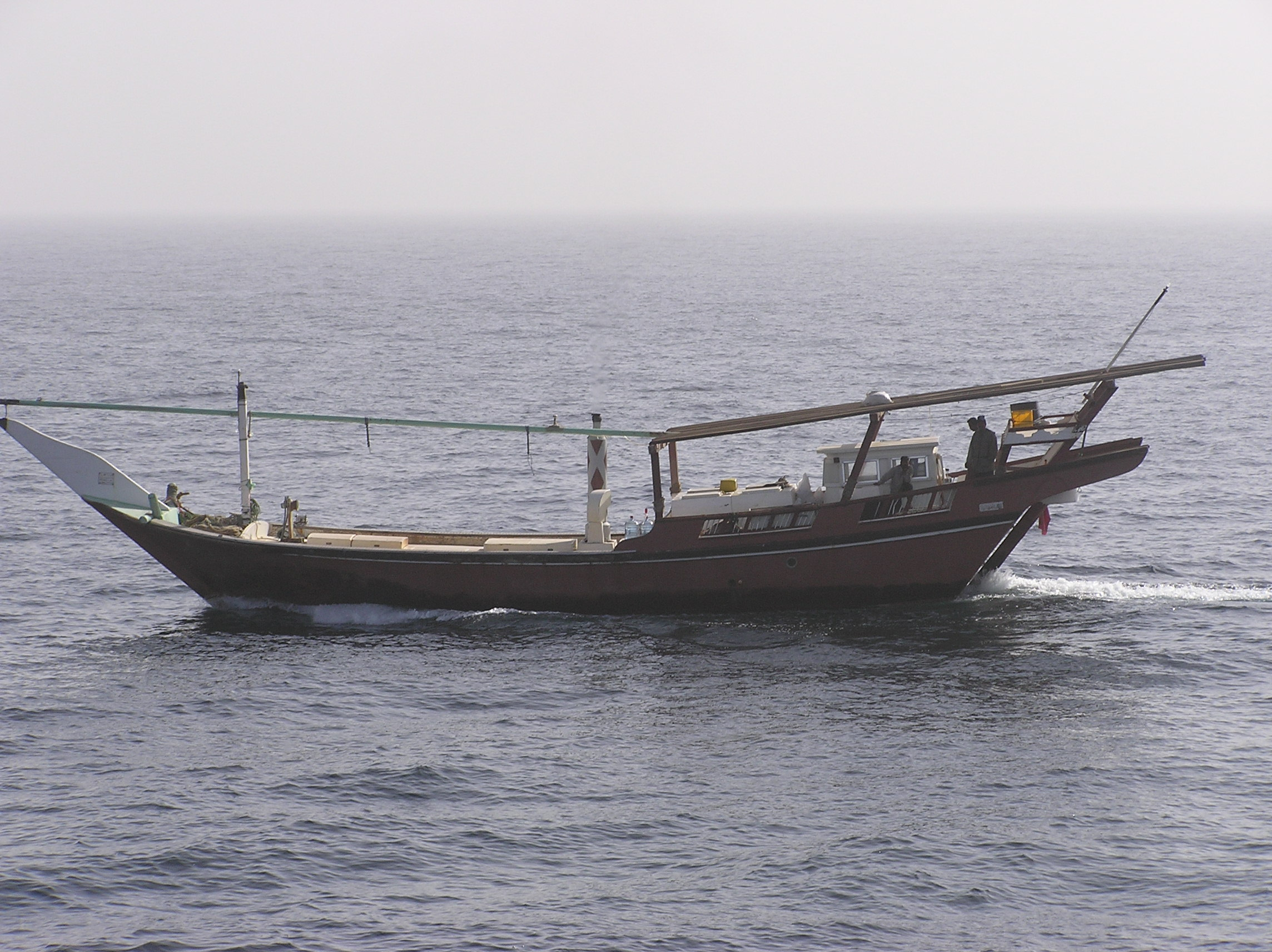
Boats like this were used for pearl diving

Pearl diving in the region was well known for thousands of years, however it only achieved economic consequences in the eighteenth to the early twentieth centuries. In 1876, pearl diving in Bahrain produced about £180,000 annually and by 1900 it rose to £1,000,000, accounting for over half value of all exports. However, in 1925 it only produced about £14,500. Pearls were shipped to Mumbai and from there to the rest of the world. Indian merchants, known as Banyan became active in exporting pearls from Bahrain to Mumbai. At the end of the nineteenth century, Bahraini and European merchants took the role of Banyans, but instead exported pearls directly to Europe.

In the nineteenth and early twentieth century, pearl diving became very important for the sustenance of thousands of Bahrainis, with almost half of adult males working in pearl diving. Stretching from May to October, the official pearl diving season was known as al-ghaws (Arabic: الغوص). Gradually, few rich merchants known as "kings of pearl" were able to control the pearl industry, because boats supplies were expensive and good divers required high amount of money to recruit.

Boat crew was divided into six categories: the pilot (nukhada; Arabic: النوخدة), his assistant, divers, pullers, apprentices and servants. While in the sea, the pilot who was usually of tribal origin and owned the boat had the authority to try and punish wrongdoers and to resolve disputes. Unless they were beyond his knowledge, crimes on boat were dealt with on the basis of "eye for eye and tooth for tooth", otherwise they were dealt with after returning to land. The rest of crew were southern Persians, Baluchis or slaves and only few of them were native Shia. Divers and pullers worked as a team; divers stayed at bottom of sea collecting pearl oysters until they were short of breath, after which they would pull the rope attached to them and the more numbered pullers would pull them back to boat. Good divers lasted longer underwater and could make 100 dives a day. They had more prestige than pullers, but were also exposed to hazards such as eardrum rupture and blindness.

Although pearl diving yielded a lot of money, divers and pullers share was small, while pilots and merchants got most of it. Disputes over shares and loans were normally taken to Islamic courts, but whenever it was about pearls, it was taken instead to a special court known as the salifa which was biased to merchants and pilots as its judge was always of tribal origin. In almost the same system as in palm cultivation, interests on loans increased with pearl catch, thus divers and pullers were almost always in loan to the pilot who in turn was in loan to the merchant. Skillful divers were given bigger loans, which meant they were more in debt and thus had to continue working with same pilot as they could not pay the loan and its high interests (up to 50 percent) on their own, especially that loans were hereditary from fathers to sons. They could take another loan from another pilot to pay the first, but they would still be stuck in the system. Only few divers were compensated as reward for their loyalty and hard work.

Pearl diving was controlled by Sunni Arab tribesmen, who enjoyed high autonomy within their estates; they resolved disputes and held their own courts, but stopped short of collecting taxes. Each tribe had control over specific pearl banks. The power of each tribe was derived from their overall power in the Gulf and Arabia. The most powerful tribe was Al Dawasir who lived in Budaiya and Zallaq; they were wealthy, numerous and could mobilize many allies in Arabia. In order to attract as many pearl tribes as possible, Al Khalifa did not interfere with pearl diving, nor did they impose taxes on boats or catches. This increased volume of exports and thus increased taxes on them. It also increased local trade and rents. Interfering in tribes affairs had negative consciences, as they threatened to emigrate, which meant decline in trade and an implicit threat of war. This was the case of Al Bin Ali in 1895 and Al Dawasir in 1923 both of which emigrated from the island.

Khuri (1980) argues that Al Khalifa tight control over palm cultivation and relaxed measures with regard to pearl diving does not mean their purpose was to favor Sunnis and oppress Shia, instead he says their purpose was to increase their revenues as much as possible from both groups; Sunni tribesmen strongly resisted any interference in their affairs and had better production in relaxed atmosphere.

=== Religious courts ===
Religious courts at the time followed Sharia (Islamic law) which itself is derived from the Qur'an and Hadith. There were four different juristic groups in Bahrain at the time: Urban Hawala (Sunni) who followed Shafi'i law, urban Najdi (Sunni) community who followed Hanbali law, tribal Arab Sunni community which followed Maliki law and the Shia community which followed Ja'fari jurisprudence. During the entire reign of Isa bin Ali, Jassim al-Mihza was the sole jurist that served the Sunni community. Appointed by the ruler, al-Mihza ruled over personal and family matters such as divorce and inheritance, but loans associated with pearl diving were excluded as Sharia speaks clearly against loan interests. Instead, the aforementioned loans were taken to the tribal salifa court.

The Shia courts on the other hand were numerous and independent of the ruler. They were not appointed nor inheritors, but attained their position by charisma and intrinsic properties. They used ijtihad (interpretation) instead of qiyas (analogy). Shia jurists had more social power than their Sunni counterparts, because they were independent of the government and religion had more social influence on Shia as they believed in taqlid, which stands for religious imitation. In addition, Shia jurists controlled the redistribution of income of Shia endowment properties, which included land, fish traps, houses, shrines and more. The Shia endowment properties were much more than the Sunni, and were run in a similar way to tribal councils, except that principles of Islam were followed. Thus Shia jurists represented an alternative to the government; they were looked upon by their followers as the "legitimate" authority, whereas the ruler treated them as religious leaders.

=== British protected state ===
The British signed two further treaties with Al Khalifa in 1880 and 1892, putting the defense and foreign relations of Bahrain in the control of Britain and turning Bahrain into a British colonial protected state. Following an incident in 1904, in which a relative of the ruler attacked Persians and Germans, the ruler agreed to place foreigner affairs in British hands. The term "foreigner" was vague, because Bahrain had no naturalization policy, population census or emigration office. This and the rapidly growing number of foreigners as a result of the pearl boom created a dual authority system, one led by the British agent and the other by the Al Khalifa ruler (Isa bin Ali).

During the First World War, Bahrain was threatened again by Wahhabis, who re-occupied the eastern part of Arabia, Ottoman and Persian, both of which did not drop their claims over the island. Britain responded to tightening its hold over Bahrain. Bahrainis were not sympathetic with the allies, which the British attributed to their lack of attention toward Shia oppression and enforcement of reforms. When war ended, Britain changed its policy in Bahrain from being cautious and giving advises to the ruler, to directly implementing reforms.

== Administrative reforms ==
The administrative reforms took place between 1919 and 1927. The nature of the reforms, sometimes referred to as "reforms of the twenties" was administrative, not political as they did not involve the issue of government legitimacy or any form of public representation. Instead they were more focused on reshuffling of public offices and economic resources. These reforms were not a result of British intervention only, as other factors such as Bahrain social order and its tribal regime had a considerable weight. The main result of these reforms was the establishment of a modern bureaucracy.

Starting from 1919, H. R. P. Dickson, then the British political agent began reforming schools, courts, municipalities and other institutions of the country. In 1919, a joint court headed by Dickson and Abdulla bin Isa, the son of the ruler was established to deal with cases of foreigners against Bahrainis. The next year, fidawis were abolished after a Municipal Council was formed. All council members were appointed, half of them by ruler and half by British, and were tasked with civil responsibilities. In 1923, the salifa court was abolished and replaced by the Customary Council. The council was formed in 1920 with its members appointed the same way as in the Municipal Council, but it was given rule over trade, including pearl industry. During the same year a Shia jurist was appointed in the government. These reforms were rejected by Al Khalifa and their allies, who sent many petition to Mumbai government against Dickson's reforms.

=== Challenges to reforms ===
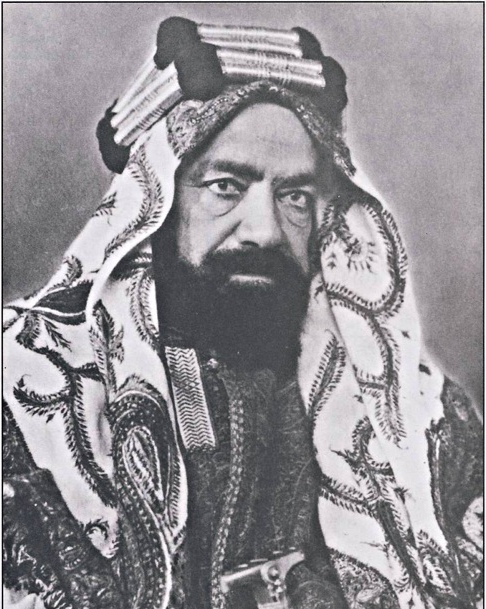
Photograph of Hamad bin Isa Al Khalifa (1872–1942), date unknown.

Dickson was replaced with Major C. K. Daly (1920–26), who unlike his predecessor used tough and uncompromising measures to introduce reforms. He started by undermining the influence of Abdulla bin Isa, who strongly opposed the reforms and strengthening his elder brother and the heir apparent, Hamad bin Isa. By 1921, the country was divided into two camps, the first supporting the reforms composed of Hamad bin Isa, the British political agent and the Shia (who at time composed about half of population), and the second opposing reforms composed of the ruler, his son Abdulla and tribesmen. A series of pro and anti reform petition were submitted by the two factions to different British officials including the Foreign Office.

The Shia, so desperate to get rid of the tribal regime, demanded in one of their many petitions to Daly that Bahrain is placed under formal British protection. The latter, who supported their demands, wrote a letter to a higher official in which he mentioned the mismanagement and corruption of Al Khalifa as well as the "atrocities and oppressions" they had committed, especially by Abdulla bin Isa. The other faction, mainly the tribal chiefs and pearl merchants, rejected the reforms on the basis that equity and standardization of law would remove their advantages such as exemption from taxes and sovereignty over estates. The Bombay government was cautious and moved slowly; 1922 ended without implementing reform plans. This encouraged Al Khalifa and Al Dawasir, who perceived themselves as the biggest losers, to use violence. The latter called for help from Wahhabis who controlled Al-Hasa and wanted to annex Bahrain to their newly formed theocratic state.

Full scale violence erupted in 1923 after smaller incidents the earlier year. It took a socio-ethnic pattern as urban Najdi Sunnis fought against urban Persian Shias and tribal Sunnis against Shia villagers. Al Dawasir of Budaiya and some members of Al Khalifa attacked Shia villages of Barbar, A'ali and Sitra, and riots erupted in Manama between Najdis and Persians. These resulted in twelve people killed, dozens wounded and women raped as well as destruction of properties. The violence settled after the British fleet arrived in Bahrain and after that ruler Isa bin Ali was forced to abdicate in favor of his son, Hamad. The petitions and political crisis, however continued to the reign of Hamad.

Hamad began his reign (1923–42) by setting up a criminal court to try those involved in the violence; Al Dawasir and sons of Khalid bin Ali Al Khalifa. Al Dawasir intimidated and killed some Shia witnesses and killed two Shia notables who encouraged others to witness against them. This time, Al Dawasir were taken to courts where they were forced to pay fines. This marked the first time in Bahrain's history they were subjected to public law. Soon after, about two thirds of Al Dawasir left for Dammam and the rest remained, only to follow them shortly after the ruler had given them a deadline to either return or leave altogether. Although the Wahhabi emir of Najd promised to exempt Al Dawasir from taxes, he later demanded it from them. This coupled with the loss of half of their fleet during emigration, the confiscation of their properties in Budaiya and blockage from diving in Bahrain pearl banks, resulted in weakening them economically and politically, and eventually led them in 1926 to plead to ruler of Bahrain to allow them back.

In 1927, the ruler allowed them to return, but only as regular subjects, which only a small part of them accepted and returned. The other part of the opposition faction was composed of sons of Khalid Al Khalifa, the ruler's cousins who attacked Sitra. The ruler was put in a dilemma between his tribal alignment and public law, and so he exiled his cousins, but paid their expenses. His cousins, however held deep grudge against residents of Sitra island who witnessed against them, and in 1924 attacked the island before their exile, killing several Shia men, women and children. Sons of Khalid Al Khalifa were sentenced to death following major Shia protests and a lengthy trial, but luckily for the ruler, they managed to escape before the sentence was carried out.

=== Implementation of reforms ===
A failed assassination was attempted on the ruler by one of his cousins in 1926, but aside from that, the rest of his reign was without major disturbances and he proceeded to implement the administration reforms. In 1926, a new "adviser" position was created to deal with internal affairs of Bahrain. From its creation and until 1957, it was occupied by Charles Belgrave, who became known locally as "the adviser".

Pearl industry

The reforms in pearl industry, which took place between 1921 and 1923 were the "testing point" for the whole reform process as they were met with the strongest resistance from tribes. Once this tribal resistance was broken, the way was open for other reforms to take place. These reforms focused on protecting divers interests and limiting merchants monopoly on the pearl industry. They included separating commercial activities from pearl diving and requiring pilots to write down an account for every diver in a book held by the diver. In the 1930s, the pearl industry lost its momentum due to a number of factors including production of cultured pearls and discovery of oil.

Private properties and public rights

Starting from early twenties, a decade-long intensive cadastral survey was carried out to register private properties by an Indian team. Those who occupied a land for ten years or more, or had the ruler-issued "gift declarations" were given ownership of the land. Difficulties soon aroused within the ruling family over distribution of former estates, but a deal in 1932 was reached that included abolishing forced labor and tax collection, and establishment of a "family court" to deal with intra-Al Khalifa disputes. In total, the ruling family owned 23% of palm gardens making them the second largest landowning category after private landholders.

Land renting was put under government supervision, with parties to it having to write out and submit to authorities the terms and conditions of contracts. With taxes and forced labor abolished, there was no need for wazirs and kikhdas and so these positions were abolished as well. A lighter state taxation system was introduced, it only contributed to a small percent of state budget, while the biggest part was through customs, especially those on pearl industry. The ruling family received much of the budget; in 1930 half of it was allocated to them either as allowances or salaries.

Judicial system

Having no standardized penal code, the Joint Court established in 1919 used Indian, British or Sudanese code as appropriate with local customs. Before the establishment of Bahrain Court in 1926, cases were taken to the Joint Court, Sharia courts or the Customary Council. Bahrain Court served as the lowest and highest in the country until a Bahrain Lower Court was established in 1927 and an appeal court in 1939. It was headed by the adviser and a member of Al Khalifa. Religious courts were integrated into a central judicial system, but were subsidiary to the Bahrain Court, which resulted in weakening the power of Shia jurists.

Policing system

The fidawis were replaced by municipal police in 1920. In 1922, Persians composed most of the police, but in 1924 one hundred Baluchis were recruited. The Baluchis were disbanded later after several incidents of incompetence and indiscipline, and were replaced by retired Indian Army Punjabis that served until 1932. The policy of recruiting from "minority cultures" continued and due to this Bahrainis avoided joining police that they only constituted 20% of it by the 1960s, the rest being foreigners (Balushis, Yemenis, Omanis, etc.). Bahrain army was founded in 1968 and adopted the style of the Jordanian army. Bahrainis, especially those of tribal origin (Sunnis) composed the majority of its recruits, while villagers (Shia) only composed a small percentage within the noncombat departments. In general, Sunnis of tribal origin dominated the authoritative departments such as justice, interior, military and emigration, while the Shia dominated the technically based such as water, health, finance and electricity.

Education

The first school in Bahrain was the American Missionary School (now known as Al Raja School), built in early nineteenth century. It only attracted Christians and Jews initially, and Bahrainis only started sending their children to it in the 1940s and 1950s. The first two Arabic schools in Bahrain were divided by sectarian lines; al-Hidaya built in 1919 in Muharraq was for Sunnis, while al-Ja'fariyah built in 1929 in Manama was for Shia. The Al Khalifa saw this sectarian division as a threat to their authority, and in 1932-33 both schools were opened to public with their names changed to Muharraq and Manama primary schools respectively. In the following years more public schools were opened and an education department was founded.

== Discovery of oil ==
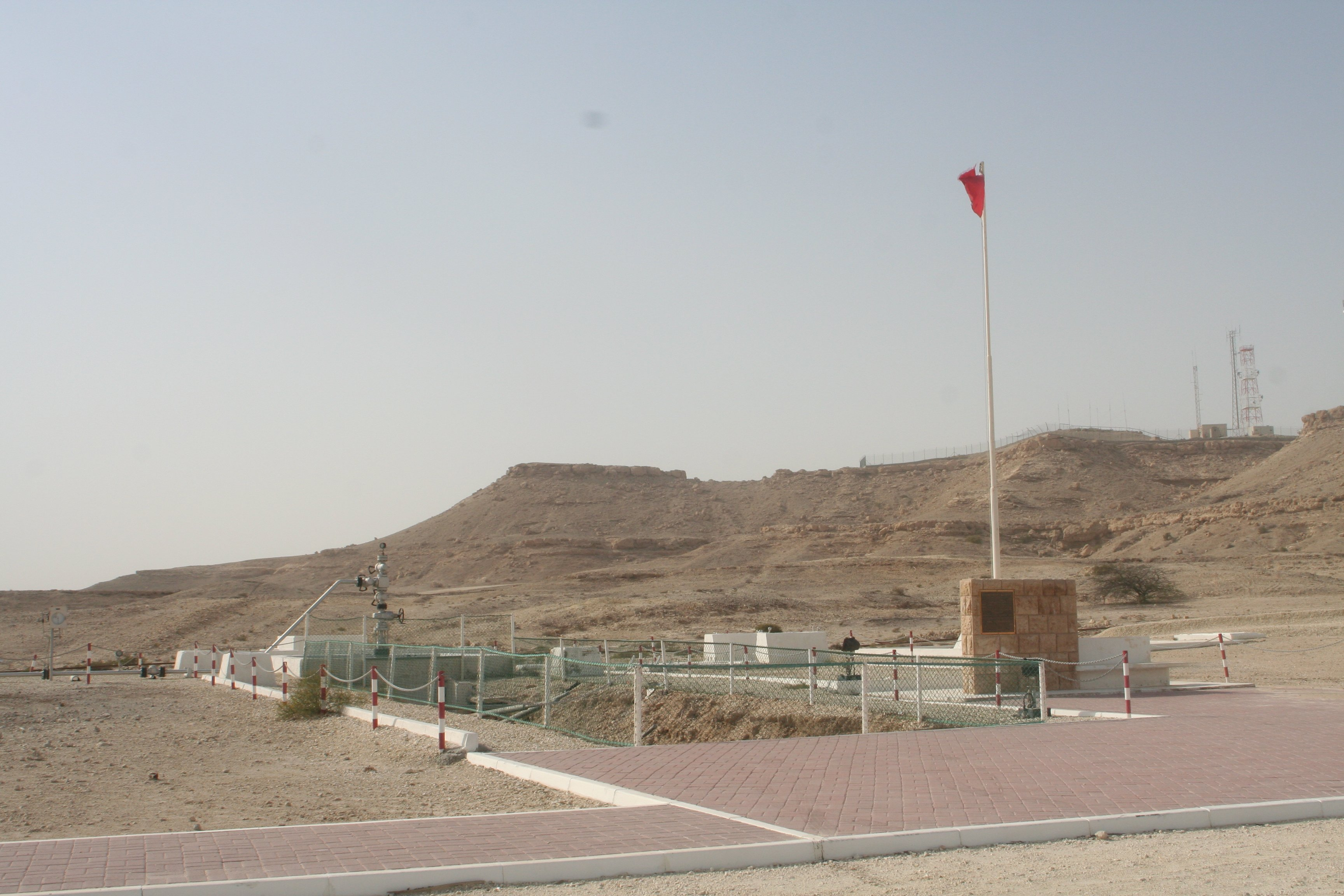
The first oil well in Bahrain was discovered in 1932

A survey of the geology of the Persian Gulf region was conducted in 1912, believed to be the region's first. In 1914, Bahrain's ruler granted to the British that he would not order the exploitation of oil nor grant any oil concessions without their prior approval. The first oil concession was given to the Bahrain Petroleum Company in 1928. Oil was later discovered in Bahrain in 1931, with the first shipment exported in a year. Few years later, an oil refinery was built in Sitra to process and refine Bahrain's 80,000 daily barrels in addition to 120,000 barrels from Dammam in neighboring Saudi Arabia connected to it via a pipeline. In the following decades, oil royalties increased significantly; from $16,750 in 1934, to $6.25 million in 1954 and to $225 million in 1974. The discovery and production of oil brought several economical and social changes to the island.

Economically, pearl diving and palm cultivation, then the backbones of the Bahraini economy were almost wiped out. Pearling boats reduced from 2,000 in the 1930s, to 192 in 1945 and to none in the 1960s. Oil production provided stable work opportunities, not only in Bahrain, but in the whole Persian Gulf region to which many Bahrainis emigrated to. This in addition to emigration of pearl tribes reduced the number of divers, leading to the eventual decline of pearl diving. Palm cultivation decline shared the same reasons, but was more gradual, dropping sharply only in the 1960s and after. Instead of farming palms, vegetable cultivation emerged and the first became a luxury venture.

== See also ==
- Bahrain province
