= Muhammad bin Khalifa Al Khalifa =

Ruler of Bahrain (r. 1843–1868)

Hakim of Bahrain
- Reign: 1843–1868
- Predecessor: Abdullah bin Ahmad Al Khalifa
- Successor: Ali bin Khalifa Al Khalifa
- Born: 1813
- Died: 25 July 1890 (aged 76–77); Mecca, Ottoman Empire
- Issue: Khalifa, Ibrahim, Hamad, Abdulaziz, Sagr, Sultan, Jaber, Ali, Salman, Ahmed, Rashid, Aisha
Names
- Muhammad bin Khalifa bin Salman bin Ahmed
- House: Khalifa
- Father: Khalifa bin Salman
- Mother: from the Al Fadhil family

Muhammad bin Khalifa Al Khalifa (محمد بن خليفة بن سلمان آل خليفة; died 1890) was the ruler of Bahrain between 1843 and 1868. He was the sixth monarch of the Khalifa dynasty.

== Early life and struggle ==
Muhammad was the grandson of Salman bin Ahmed, co-ruler of Bahrain, and had four brothers, Ali, Duaij, Salman and Rashid. He served as the governor of Manama during the reign of his father, Khalifa bin Salman. Muhammad succeeded his father as the co-ruler when he died in 1834, but with diminished power. In 1842 Muhammad challenged the reign of his grand uncle Abdullah bin Ahmad Al Khalifa and declared himself as the ruler of Bahrain and Qatar. However, Muhammad was defeated in the battle of Al Nasfah against Abdullah bin Ahmad Al Khalifa and took refuge in the Emirate of Najd under the protection of Saudi ruler Abdullah bin Thunayan.

== Reign ==
=== Early reign ===
In early 1843 Muhammad returned to Qatar and then to Bahrain, and in April 1843 he defeated Abdullah bin Ahmad Al Khalifa becoming the ruler. Among his first steps taken as ruler was to appoint his brother, Ali bin Khalifa, as chief of Al Bidda, Qatar that year, thereby delegating all mainland affairs and solidifying Qatar's status as a Bahraini suzerainty.

=== Conflicts with Faisal bin Turki ===
During his reign Muhammad paid an annual tribute to Faisal bin Turki, successor of Abdullah bin Thunayan as the Emir of Najd. After eliminating his rival Abdullah bin Thunayan, Faisal bin Turki consolidated his power by subduing opposition tribes in Najd and taking control of key economic centres such as Al-Ahsa and Saihat. However, Faisal's ambitions extended beyond these territories. In 1847, he attempted to intervene in Bahrain, exploiting internal conflicts within the ruling family. Although unsuccessful in capturing Bahrain, he settled for a peace agreement that included a tribute payment. Faisal's inability to seize Bahrain was, in part, due to the firm stance of the British government against Saudi expansion in the Persian Gulf. The British, who had substantial interests in the region, closely monitored Faisal's movements. Their support for Muhammad bin Khalifa and their strategic positions in the Gulf influenced the broader regional dynamics.

However, in 1850, Muhammad began not to pay the amount, and next year he attempted to get support from the Ottomans, but his attempt was not fruitful. In May 1851, Faisal launched his third attempt to capture Bahrain, ordering his forces to proceed towards Al Bidda, Qatar, which was intended to be used as a staging area for an invasion of Bahrain, preparing for a confrontation with Muhammad bin Khalifa. In response, Ali bin Khalifa, the Bahraini representative in Qatar, called on all men of fighting age to defend Al Bidda, as well as sending for help from Saeed bin Tahnun Al Nahyan of Abu Dhabi. This culminated in the Battle of Mesaimeer, taking place from 2–4 June 1851. Although the resistance was initially successful in repelling the invasion, Ali bin Khalifa's forces later retreated to their ships. Shortly after the fighting had taken place, Mohammed bin Thani, an influential tribal leader in Al Bidda, pursued a separate peace agreement with Faisal and agreed to his governance, a move seen as a betrayal by the Bahrainis. Upon receiving news of this, Muhammad bin Khalifa ordered a naval blockade of Al Bidda in June 1851. He also sent Hamad bin Mohammed Al Khalifa to inform British political resident Samuel Hennell of his concerns of a joint Wahhabi-Qatari invasion and requested protection, stating that he was willing to be a British subject in exchange for such protection. The British originally rejected this proposition.

Upon further analysis of the situation, Justin Sheil, a high-ranking British diplomat in Persia, concluded that Faisal bin Turki's control of the Qatari Peninsula would be detrimental to British interests as it would provide the Ottoman Empire with an opportunity to incorporate Bahrain under its aegis in the event of a joint Qatari-Wahhabi invasion of the island. Thus, on 1 July, Hennel directed multiple British warships to be sent to protect Manama Harbor in Bahrain. He then separately wrote letters to Faisal bin Turki and Mohammed bin Thani, warning them against launching a naval invasion of the Bahraini coast.

To counteract any potential invasions from mainland Saudi Arabia, Muhammad bin Khalifa dispatched a naval force comprising 11 vessels, manned by a complement of nearly 800 men, under the command of his brother Sheikh Ali bin Khalifa, formerly the Bahraini representative at Al Bidda. This fleet was tasked with the blockade of Qatif Port. The blockading force, however, soon found itself engaged by a superior flotilla of 18 warships, manned by Utubi exiles from Qais Island allied with Faisal bin Turki. In the ensuing naval action, the Qais party suffered considerable losses, including the deaths of several notable personages: Mubarak bin Ahmed, Sheikh Rashid bin Abdullah, and Bashir bin Rahma. The total casualties on the Qais side amounted to no fewer than 150 men.

In the aftermath of the battle and subsequent naval skirmish, Muhammad bin Khalifa faced a complex diplomatic situation. His brother's evacuation of the fort at Al Bidda on 8 June 1851 marked a significant loss of Bahraini influence in Qatar. Muhammad bin Khalifa initially resisted peace overtures, with Ali bin Khalifa personally rejecting proposals for reconciliation from Faisal bin Turki. However, facing pressure from multiple sides and fearing further erosion of Bahraini influence, Muhammad bin Khalifa eventually agreed to a peace settlement. This agreement, brokered by Saeed bin Tahnun of Abu Dhabi on July 25, 1851, required Bahrain to pay an annual sum of 4,000 German krones to Faisal bin Turki as zakat. In return, Faisal agreed to restore the fort of Al Bidda to Bahraini control and to cease interference in Qatari affairs.

=== Later reign and abdication ===
Muhammad signed a treaty with the British in 1856 whereby he guaranteed that he would capture the British vessels carrying war slaves in his territories and to ban his or his subjects' vessels from carrying slaves. In 1860 Muhammad asked the Persians to be the protector of his reign due to the restrictions on his actions imposed by the British due the treaty mentioned above, and his proposal was welcomed by them, but was not materialized. Muhammad and his brother Ali were forced by the British Resident, Commander Felix Jones, to sign a convention which effectively integrated Bahrain into the Trucial System in 1861.

Muhammad abdicated as a result of the British intervention after an alleged violation of the 1861 convention which prevented him from carrying out maritime depredations. In 1867 he and the ruler of Abu Dhabi, Zayed bin Khalifa Al Nahyan, who led a force of 2,000 men from Abu Dhabi, attacked the coast of Qatar in what would be known as the Qatari–Bahraini War. This led to great damage in the region, and this incident accelerated his deposition by the British. Muhammad fled Bahrain in 1868 and first went to Khor Hassan in Qatar before settling in Qatif. He was succeeded by his brother, Ali bin Khalifa Al Khalifa, who was killed by the forces of Muhammad bin Abdullah Al Khalifa in 1869. The British forces captured Muhammad and sent him to a prison in India. In addition, due to the extensive intrafamilial fractions Britain blockaded the islands of Bahrain and took all of the Al Khalifa members into custody imposing conditions that resulted in the changing the ruler. They appointed Isa bin Ali Al Khalifa as the new ruler of Bahrain.

Despite imprisoning Jassim bin Mohammed Al Thani, the son of Qatar's ruler, in the prelude to the Qatari–Bahraini War, Jassim lobbied for his release from prison. He wrote to Isa bin Ali, promising to pay him a ransom for Muhammad's release: a thousand of the finest camels and ninety of the noblest horses. In 1888 Muhammad was freed from the Indian prison and brought to Mecca where he lived as a pensioner of the Ottomans until his death in 1890.

Regnal titles
Preceded by Abdullah bin Ahmad Al Khalifa	Hakim of Bahrain; 1843–1868	Succeeded by Ali bin Khalifa Al Khalifa
