= Battle of Mesaimeer =

Armed conflict in Qatar

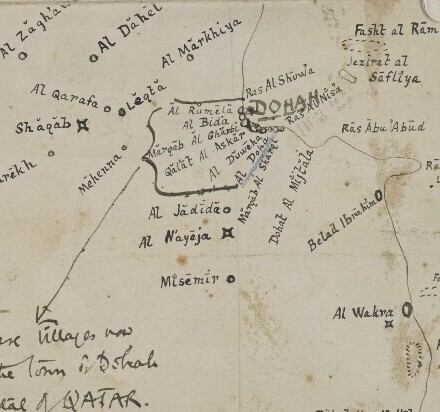
- A 1937 sketch map illustrating both Mesaimeer and Doha (modern Al Bidda)
Date	2 June – 4 June, 1851
Location	Mesaimeer, Qatar
Result	Stalemate: Bahraini and Abu Dhabi forces retreat; Qatar defects to the Emirate of Nejd; Eventual treaty regranting Bahrain dominion over Qatar in exchange for an annual zakat to the Emirate of Nejd

Belligerents
Qatari tribes	Bahrain; Abu Dhabi (nominally allied with Qatar) Supported by:United Kingdom	Emirate of Nejd

Commanders and leaders
Mohammed bin Thani; Jassim bin Mohammed Al Thani	Muhammad bin Khalifa Al Khalifa; Ali bin Khalifa Al Khalifa; Saeed bin Tahnun Al Nahyan	Faisal bin Turki

Strength
Unknown ("few in number" according to sources)	Unknown	

Casualties and losses
- Unknown

The Battle of Mesaimeer (Arabic: وقعة مسيمير) was a significant military engagement that took place from June 2 to June 4, 1851, near the village of Mesaimeer in Qatar. The conflict primarily involved Qatari forces led by Mohammed bin Thani and Jassim bin Mohammed Al Thani, then under Bahraini suzerainty, against the invading army of Faisal bin Turki, Imam of Emirate of Nejd, who was seeking to stage his third invasion attempt of Bahrain from the peninsula. Bahraini and Abu Dhabi forces, nominally allied with Qatar, remained largely uninvolved in the fighting.

The battle, which lasted three days, was primarily centered around Faisal bin Turki's camp in Mesaimeer and the nearby settlement of Al Bidda. On 2 June, the Qatari and allied forces, though vastly outnumbered, successfully repelled an attack by Faisal's army. The Bahraini ruler Ali bin Khalifa, nominally allied with the Qataris, retreated to his ship on the second day of battle, declining to render aid. After the third day of fighting and following Faisal's retreat to his camp in Mesaimeer, Mohammed bin Thani made peace with Faisal, angering his former Bahraini allies, who viewed this as a betrayal.

After this peace agreement, in which Mohammed bin Thani agreed to Wahhabi governance, a new agreement was brokered by Saeed bin Tahnun Al Nahyan in July 1851, stipulating that Qatar be returned to Bahrain in exchange for a tribute paid to Faisal bin Turki. This battle and the political enmity arising from it would contribute to the start of the Qatari–Bahraini War in 1867.

== Background ==
The withdrawal of Muhammad Ali of Egypt's forces from the Arabian Peninsula, following the 1840 Convention of London imposed by European powers, created a political vacuum. British dominance over maritime navigation in the Persian Gulf tipped the balance of power in favor of British influence over the nominal Ottoman authority.

To restore equilibrium, Muhammad Ali directed his aides to empower Faisal bin Turki, who had been imprisoned during his campaign in Najd, facilitating his escape from Egypt. Faisal's return was seen as crucial for maintaining balance, given his rightful claim to rule in Najd, which had been under Abdullah bin Thunayan's control. Faisal's relationship with Muhammad Ali appears to have been pragmatic, governed by mutual interests.

Upon regaining control, Faisal swiftly eliminated his rival, Abdullah bin Thunayan, and consolidated his power by subduing opposition tribes in Najd. This centralized authority required financial resources, prompting Faisal to target Al-Ahsa, Qatif, and Saihat—key economic hubs. He imposed his control over these regions, ensuring a steady flow of funds to his treasury by imposing what was termed zakat, though it functioned as a tax in contemporary terms.

Faisal's ambitions extended beyond these territories. In 1847, he attempted to intervene in Bahrain, exploiting internal conflicts within the ruling family. Although unsuccessful in capturing Bahrain, he settled for a peace agreement that included a tribute payment. His inability to seize Bahrain was primarily due to attacks on the Al-Qassim Province by Muhammad bin Awn and Khalid bin Saud, and the firm stance of the British government against Saudi expansion in the Persian Gulf. The British, who had substantial interests in the region, closely monitored Faisal's movements. Their support for the Bahraini sheikh and their strategic positions in the Gulf influenced the broader regional dynamics.

Mohammed bin Thani migrated from Fuwayrit to Al Bidda in 1848, three years before Faisal bin Turki launched his campaign. Prior to this migration, each tribe and settlement had its independent leader, and there was no documented instance of their unification in battle. The concept of a unified land or nation was not present. However, with Mohammed bin Thani's arrival, Qatar began to gain significant economic and political weight.

== Chronology ==
=== Beginning of invasion ===
In 1851, Faisal launched his third attempt to capture Bahrain. In May of that year, he ordered his forces to proceed towards Al Bidda, Qatar, which was intended to be used as a staging area for an invasion of Bahrain. In response, Ali bin Khalifa, the Bahraini representative in Qatar, called on all men of fighting age to defend Al Bidda, as well as sending for help from Saeed bin Tahnun Al Nahyan of Abu Dhabi. Faisal's strategic moves included securing support from regional leaders, including Sultan bin Saqr Al Qasimi of Sharjah and Maktoum bin Butti bin Suhail of Dubai, ensuring the loyalty of local tribes, and promising to restore order and stability. Faisal's efforts to enlist the support of Abdullah bin Ahmad Al Khalifa's sons were likely intended to frame his campaign as a family matter, thus minimizing the likelihood of British intervention.

Qatari tribes pledged their intention on defending Al Bidda from the Wahhabis, and provided Ali bin Khalifa with ample amounts of munitions, crafts and fighting men. Their combined forces blockaded Qatif Port in an attempt to deter Faisal's forces. However, on 18 May, upon hearing that Faisal's forces were only two days away from Al Bidda, the joint Qatari-Bahraini forces returned to Qatar and relayed events to Saeed bin Tahnoun, requesting immediate reinforcements.

=== Battle ===
Historical accounts of the conflict vary, and few specifics are known with certainty. All sources state that the battle began on 2 June and lasted for three days. According to the Wahhabi historian Uthman Ibn Bishr, the conflict began when Imam Faisal bin Turki ordered his son Abdullah to lead a contingent of Wahhabis to besiege Al Bidda fortress. Abdullah and his forces surrounded the fortress, prompting Ali bin Khalifa and his followers to flee to Bahrain by ship, leaving behind the fortress and its munitions. Upon learning of this, the people of Qatar sought peace from Faisal, claiming they were overpowered and coerced. Faisal accepted their plea, and they pledged allegiance to him, adhering to the faith of Wahhabism.

British political resident Samuel Hennell, in a report to Arthur Malet, Secretary to the Government of British India in Bombay on 18 June, 1851, gives a differing account. He noted the defeat of the Wahhabi forces on 2 June. A subsequent confrontation occurred at Mesaimeer near Al Bidda on 4 June, rendering the situation on the Qatari coast highly unstable. By 6 June, Ali bin Khalifa and Saeed bin Tahnun were forced to evacuate the fort, leaving Al Bidda. At this juncture, Mohammed bin Thani, the Sheikh of Al Bidda, shifted his allegiance to Faisal bin Turki, aiding the latter in taking control of the region.

The accounts of both the Saudi and British narratives omit details of the battle and the role of Qatari troops in repelling the invasion. The British account particularly labels the Qataris as treacherous, echoing Ali bin Khalifa's sentiment towards Mohammed bin Thani's actions. This perspective might have been influenced by British reliance on information from the Bahraini Sheikh.

According to an oral account by Muhammad ibn Ahmad, documented in Nasser bin Ali Al Thani's book Glimpses of Qatari History, the battle lasted three days. On the first day, a skirmish of gunfire ensued between the Bahraini-Qatari forces and those of Faisal ibn Turki without any close combat. On the second day, Qatari forces, led by Sheikh Jassim bin Mohammed Al Thani, engaged Faisal's troops in a fierce battle while the Bahraini forces retreated to their ships, observing from the sea and not participating in the battle. During the hostilities, Jassim bin Mohammed killed Fares Al-Otaibi, a high-ranking Wahhabi officer in close quarters. On the third day, Faisal's forces retreated to their camp at Mesaimeer. Mohammed bin Thani advised Ali bin Khalifa to make peace with Faisal, fearing a renewed attack once they had regrouped. This suggestion was rebuffed by Ali bin Khalifa, who perceived it as betrayal.

=== Defection and Bahraini withdrawal ===
Shortly after the final day of battle, Mohammed bin Thani sent a letter to Faisal bin Turki's camp requesting peace and agreeing to be his subject, to which Faisal obliged. On 8 June, Qatari forces assumed control of Burj Al-Maah, a watchtower guarding Doha's main water source, close to Al Bidda Fort where the allied forces of Ali bin Khalifa and Saeed bin Tahnoun were stationed. Upon hearing the news, they fled to Bahrain without incident, much to the dismay of Faisal who admonished Mohammed bin Thani for not capturing them.

=== Bahraini blockade and British intervention ===
The ruler of Bahrain, Muhammad bin Khalifa Al Khalifa, having been made aware of events, ordered a naval blockade of Al Bidda in June 1851. He also sent Hamad bin Mohammed Al Khalifa to inform British political resident Samuel Hennell of his concerns of a joint Wahhabi-Qatari invasion and requested protection, stating that he was willing to be a British subject in exchange for such protection. The British originally rejected this proposition.

However, upon further analysis of the situation, Justin Sheil, a high-ranking British diplomat in Persia, concluded that Faisal bin Turki's control of the Qatari Peninsula would be detrimental to British interests as it would provide the Ottoman Empire with an opportunity to incorporate Bahrain under its aegis in the event of a joint Qatari-Wahhabi invasion of the island. Thus, on 1 July, Hennel directed multiple British warships to be sent to protect Manama Harbor in Bahrain. He then warned Faisal bin Turki against launching any naval invasions of the island. He also wrote a letter to Mohammed bin Thani, in which he stated that, although it was not the intention of the British to interfere in a tribal dispute in which they were uninvolved, it was necessary to do so to prevent the Ottomans from establishing a stronghold on the Arabian Peninsula. In closing, he warned Thani against invading the Bahraini coast.

To counteract any potential invasions from mainland Saudi Arabia, Bahraini ruler Muhammad bin Khalifa dispatched a naval force comprising 11 vessels, manned by a complement of nearly 800 men, under the command of Sheikh Ali bin Khalifa, formerly the Bahraini representative at Al Bidda. This fleet was tasked with the blockade of Qatif port. The blockading force, however, soon found itself engaged by a superior flotilla of 18 warships, manned by Utubi exiles from Qais Island allied with Faisal bin Turki. In the ensuing naval action, the Qais party suffered considerable losses, including the deaths of several notable personages: Mubarak bin Abdullah Al Khalifa, his brother Rashid bin Abdullah, and Bashir bin Rahma, son of Rahmah ibn Jabir al-Jalhami. The total casualties on the Qais side amounted to no fewer than 150 men.

=== Peace negotiations and subsequent treaty ===
The untimely demise of Faisal's Qais confederate, Mubarak, necessitated a reorientation in strategy. Relinquishing his designs upon Bahrain, the Wahhabi Amir made a conciliatory overture on 20 July, 1851, proposing to dispatch his two brothers and son to parley with Ali bin Khalifa aboard his ship. This proposal, however, met with unequivocal rejection from Ali bin Khalifa.

In his increasing desperation for a peaceful resolution, Faisal enlisted Ahmed bin Mohammad Sudairi, the chief of Al Ahsa, as mediator. Sudairi's proposition to confer with Ali bin Khalifa aboard the latter's vessel was rebuffed with the reply: "If you come without demands, you are welcome; if not, stay away." This intransigence on Ali bin Khalifa's part was bolstered by active British support, manifest in the deployment of their naval squadron off Al Bidda's coast to forestall any invasion of Bahrain by the allied forces stationed at Al Bidda and Doha.

Despite the abortive Sudairi mission, peace negotiations persisted. Saeed bin Tahnun of Abu Dhabi, who enjoyed amicable relations with both contending parties, acceded to a request from the Sultan of Muscat and Sheikh of Sharjah to mediate the Wahabi-Bahraini dispute. Their intervention was motivated by apprehensions that Faisal's prolonged sojourn in Qatar posed a threat to the security of the Trucial coast.

Sheikh Saeed's mediation efforts, commencing in the third week of July 1851, finished by 25 July. The resultant accord stipulated that Sheikh Ali would remit 4,000 German krones annually as zakat to Faisal, while the latter agreed to restore Al Bidda Fort to Ali bin Khalifa and to abstain from interference in Qatari affairs or on behalf of Abdullah bin Ahmed's sons.

This agreement, ratified by Mohammad bin Khalifa of Bahrain and acquiesced to by Mohammad bin Thani of Qatar, led to Faisal's departure for Al Ahsa on 26 July, 1851. Consequent to this, Bahrain lifted its blockade of Qatif, and the British withdrew their naval presence. Despite the peace agreement being signed earlier, Al Bidda's blockade was only lifted on 2 August, 1851.

=== Aftermath and legacy ===
Despite the peace treaty between the Emirate of Nejd and Bahrain signed in July 1851, tensions would again arise between the two in early 1852, as Muhammad bin Khalifa would once again relay his concerns to British diplomats that Faisal was preparing to invade Bahrain.

Jassim bin Mohammed Al Thani, future ruler of Qatar and son of Mohammed bin Thani, participated in the battle and wrote a poem about it in his later years, in which he praises the Qatari forces' bravery:

أرى مـن صروف الدهـر ما كدر الصفا وجفـن سـهر مهـوب بالنـوم ذايـل
حميـناك ـمن دوالت اإلـمام فيـصل جمـوع يقديهـا طـرى الفعايـل
نطحـنا الـسبايا ـيوم ـكرت ورودـها والشـيخ فـي مثنـاة جمعـه يخايـل
نطحـنا الـسبايا بالـسبايا ودـبرت
ودم لعتيبـي فـوق رمحـي وشـايل

— Jassim bin Mohammed Al Thani
Translation:

I see from the vicissitudes of time what has troubled the serenity,
And an eyelid, sleepless, fearful of slumber, withering.
We protected you from the changes of Imam Faisal,
Crowds led by fresh deeds.
We confronted the invaders on the day of their attack,
And the Sheikh, in the midst of his people, stands tall.
We confronted their troops and planned our moves,
And the blood of an Otaibi stained my spear, carried high.

The battle created political enmity between Qatar and Bahrain which contributed to the Qatari–Bahraini War in 1867 and Qatar's subsequent emergence as an independent political entity, which came to fruition in September 1868 with the signing of a treaty between Mohammad bin Thani and the British representative Lewis Pelly. The battle also served as Jassim bin Mohammed's inspiration to create a flag for Qatar, as his side was the only one lacking its own flag.
