= Expedition to Najd (1836) =

Ottoman military operation

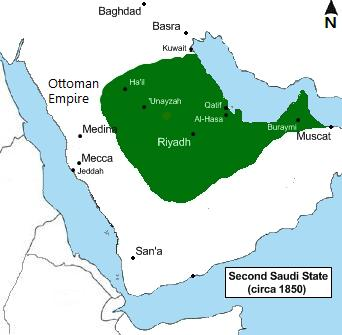
- Territories of the Second Saudi State, 1850
Date	1836
Location	Najd
Result	Egyptian-Ottoman victory
Territorial changes	Muhammad Ali occupies Najd, al-Hasa and Qatif and gains the submission of Bahrain, Qatar and Trucial Oman

Belligerents
Egypt Eyalet; Ottoman Empire	Emirate of Najd

Commanders and leaders
Muhammad Ali of Egypt; Khalid bin Saud Al Saud	Faisal bin Turki Al Saud (POW)

Strength
Unknown	Unknown

Casualties and losses
Unknown	Unknown

The Expedition to Najd (1836) was a military operation organised by Ottoman military commander Muhammad Ali Pasha that invaded the Second Saudi State based in Najd after the refusal of tribute payments by its ruler, Faisal bin Turki al-Saud.

== Background ==
The removal of Ottoman forces from Najd in 1824 marked an opportunity for the Saudi-Wahhabi alliance to reassert its control over the region. Turki Ibn Abdullah was able to accomplish this while tacitly acknowledging the suzerainty of Muhammad Ali, he captured Riyadh, Arid, Kharj, Mahmal, Sudayr and Aflaj with forces he was able to gather in the areas surrounding Riyadh. By 1830 he was able to assert his authority over Hasa but had minimal control over Qasim and Ha’il. He restricted his campaigns to avoid provoking the Ottoman forces in the Hejaz. By 1831 his authority was challenged by internal divisions within his own family which resulted in his assassination in 1834 by his cousin Mishari who was then killed by Turki's son Faisal who then assumed the position of Imam. By 1837 Faisals refusal to pay tribute to the Ottoman forces in the Hejaz provoked them to march against him.

== Expedition ==
Faisal sent his brother to Mecca with presents, submissive words and offers of some camels for transport while he secretly helped his Asiri allies. Despite this act, Mehmet Ali organised an expedition against Najd in 1836. Mehmet Ali's forces landed at Yanbu in 1836 and marched against Najd. They were accompanied by Khalid, a Saudi pretender. Faisal assembled an army and went out to meet the invaders, however his troops melted away as word spread of the superior enemy forces. The people of Riyadh were also intimidated by the enemy forces and refused to fight. Faysal was able to slip out with a number of followers and Khalid entered Riyadh in 1837. For a while Mehmet Ali accepted the submission of Faisal and left the two Saudi chiefs ruling over a partitioned Najd, but in 1838 Mehmet Ali's forces commanded by Hurshid Pasha marched against Faisal and defeated him. Faisal was then taken captive and imprisoned in Cairo. Mehmet Ali had occupied Najd, al-Hasa and Qatif. He also secured the submission of Bahrain, Qatar and Trucial Oman and won the cooperation of Kuwait.

== Aftermath ==
European pressure and British diplomacy led to the recall of most of the army from Najd and eastern Arabia in April 1840. The rule over Najd ended by the close of 1841. Faisal, however, escaped from Cairo in 1843. He then killed Ibn Thunayan and began his second reign over the Saudi state. This time he recognised the suzerainty of the Ottoman Sultan and paid an annual tribute in exchange for an Ottoman recognition of himself as “ruler of all the Arabs”.
