= List of wars involving the United Arab Emirates =

This is a list of wars involving the United Arab Emirates and its predecessor states

Conflict	United Arab Emirates, its predecessors, and allies	Opponents	Result	Emirati leaders		Emirati losses	
Conflict	United Arab Emirates, its predecessors, and allies	Opponents	Result	Prime Minister	President	Military	Civilian
Gulf Campaign (1809)	Ras Al Khaimah: Al-Qawasim	United Kingdom: East India Company	Defeat: Over half of the largest vessels destroyed at Ras Al Khaimah	Hassan bin Ali al-Anezi		?	?
Gulf Campaign (1819)	Ras Al Khaimah: Al-Qawasim	United Kingdom: East India Company; Supported by Omani Empire	Defeat: Hassan bin Rahma Al Qasimi deposed; Sultan bin Saqr al-Qasimi restored as ruler; Signing of the General Maritime Treaty of 1820	Hassan bin Rahma al-Qasimi		?	?
Qatari–Bahraini War (1867-1868)	Bahrain (Emirate of Abu Dhabi) Abu Dhabi (1867)	Qatar	Ceasefire: British intervention and signing of the Anglo-Bahraini Treaty of 1868; British recognition of Al-Thani in Qatar; Independence of Qatar from Bahrain	Zayed bin Khalifa Al Nahyan		?	?
Qatari–Abu Dhabi War (1881–1893)	Abu Dhabi; Supported by: United Kingdom	Qatar; Supported by: Ottoman Empire	Inconclusive: No territorial changes; British-mediated peace agreement in 1893	Zayed bin Khalifa Al Nahyan		?	500+ killed
Buraimi War (1952–1955)	Trucial Emirates: Emirate of Abu Dhabi; British Empire; Supported by Sultanate of Muscat and Oman; Aden Protectorate	Saudi Arabia Supported by: Al Bu Shamis tribe; Na'im tribe	Victory: Surrender of Saudi forces; Ceasefire agreement with Bedouin tribes; Saudi Arabia withdraws and Oman regains control of Na'im and Al Bu Shamis, Buraimi and Hamasah; Emirate of Abu Dhabi consolidates control of Al Ain; Start of the Saudi Arabia – United Arab Emirates border dispute	Zayed bin Sultan al-Nahyan		?	?
Lebanese Civil War (1976–1979)	(Arab League) ADF: Syria; Saudi Arabia; Sudan; United Arab Emirates; Libya; South Yemen	LF; FLA	Victory: ADF mission goals achieved; ADF becomes an all-Syrian force in 1979	Maktoum bin Rashid Al Maktoum	Zayed bin Sultan Al Nahyan	3 killed, 8 injured	None
Gulf War (1990–1991)	United States; United Kingdom; France; Saudi Arabia; Egypt; Kuwait; (United Nations) Coalition: Afghan mujahideen; Argentina; Australia; Bahrain; Bangladesh; Belgium; Canada; Czechoslovakia; Denmark; Germany; Greece; Honduras; Hungary; Italy; Japan; Luxembourg; Morocco; Netherlands; New Zealand; Niger; Norway; Oman; Pakistan; Philippines; Poland; Portugal; Qatar; Romania; Senegal; Sierra Leone; Singapore; South Korea; Spain; Sweden; Syria; Turkey; United Arab Emirates	Iraq	Victory: State of Kuwait resumes self-governance over all Kuwaiti sovereign territory; Establishment of a demilitarized zone and construction of a separation barrier along the Iraq–Kuwait border	Maktoum bin Rashid Al Maktoum	Zayed bin Sultan Al Nahyan	6 killed	None
First Libyan Civil War (2011)	(Libya) Anti-Gaddafi forces Qatar NATO: Belgium; Bulgaria; Canada; Denmark; France; Greece; Italy; Netherlands; Norway; Poland (only humanitarian and medical aid); Romania; Spain; Turkey; United Kingdom; United States; Other countries: Jordan; Qatar; Sweden; United Arab Emirates; Minor border clashes: Tunisia: Tunisian Army; Tunisian Police; Supported by: Egypt	Libyan Arab Jamahiriya	Victory: Complete overthrow and collapse of the Gaddafi regime.; Killing of Muammar Gaddafi and end of his rule over Libya on 20 October 2011; Start and continuation of the Libyan Crisis; Assumption of interim control by National Transitional Council; remained in power until August 8, 2012; UN authorisation of NATO led military intervention; Diplomatic recognition of NTC as sole governing authority for Libya by 105 countries, UN, EU, AL and AU; Factional violence in the aftermath of the war leading to another civil war in 2014	Mohammed bin Rashid Al Maktoum	Khalifa bin Zayed Al Nahyan	None	None
Second Libyan Civil War (2014–2020)	(Libya) Libyan Government; Egypt; United Arab Emirates; United States	(Libya) GNC Shura Council (Benghazi); Shura Council (Derna) Islamic State	Ceasefire: Ceasefire ratified on 23 October 2020; Egyptian military intervention	Mohammed bin Rashid Al Maktoum	Khalifa bin Zayed Al Nahyan	None	None
War on ISIS (2014–present)	Iraq; Iraqi Kurdistan; Free Syrian Army; Rojava; United States; United Kingdom; Jordan; Turkey; Saudi Arabia; Bahrain; Qatar; United Arab Emirates; Morocco; Australia; Belgium; Canada; France; Germany; Denmark; Norway	Islamic State al-Nusra Front; Khorasan	Ongoing: Unilateral US-Arab intervention against Syrian Islamists	Mohammed bin Rashid Al Maktoum	Khalifa bin Zayed Al Nahyan	None	None
Yemeni Civil War (2015–present)	(Yemen) Hadi government (South Yemen) Southern Movement; Saudi Arabia; United Arab Emirates; Sudan; Senegal; Bahrain; South Korea; Kuwait; Qatar; Egypt; Morocco; Jordan	(Yemen) Houthi government: Houthis; (Yemen) Saleh loyalists; al-Qaeda Islamic State	Ongoing: Houthis dissolve Yemeni government; Saudi Arabian-led intervention in Yemen; War between the Hadi government and the STC	Mohammed bin Rashid Al Maktoum	Khalifa bin Zayed Al Nahyan	120 killed	None
Yemeni Civil War (2015–present)	(South Yemen) STC; United Arab Emirates	(Yemen) Hadi government	Ongoing: Houthis dissolve Yemeni government; Saudi Arabian-led intervention in Yemen; War between the Hadi government and the STC	Mohammed bin Rashid Al Maktoum	Khalifa bin Zayed Al Nahyan	120 killed	None
2026 Israeli–United States strikes on Iran (2026–present)	United States United Arab Emirates	Iran	Ongoing: Iranian missile and drone retaliation which involved the bombing of cities and infrastructure in the UAE; Damage reported at Dubai International Airport and many other civilian infrastructure; UAE authorities reported interception of some of the incoming missiles	Mohammed bin Rashid Al Maktoum	Khalifa bin Zayed Al Nahyan	2 killed	11 killed
