= Qatari–Bahraini War =

1867–1868 war

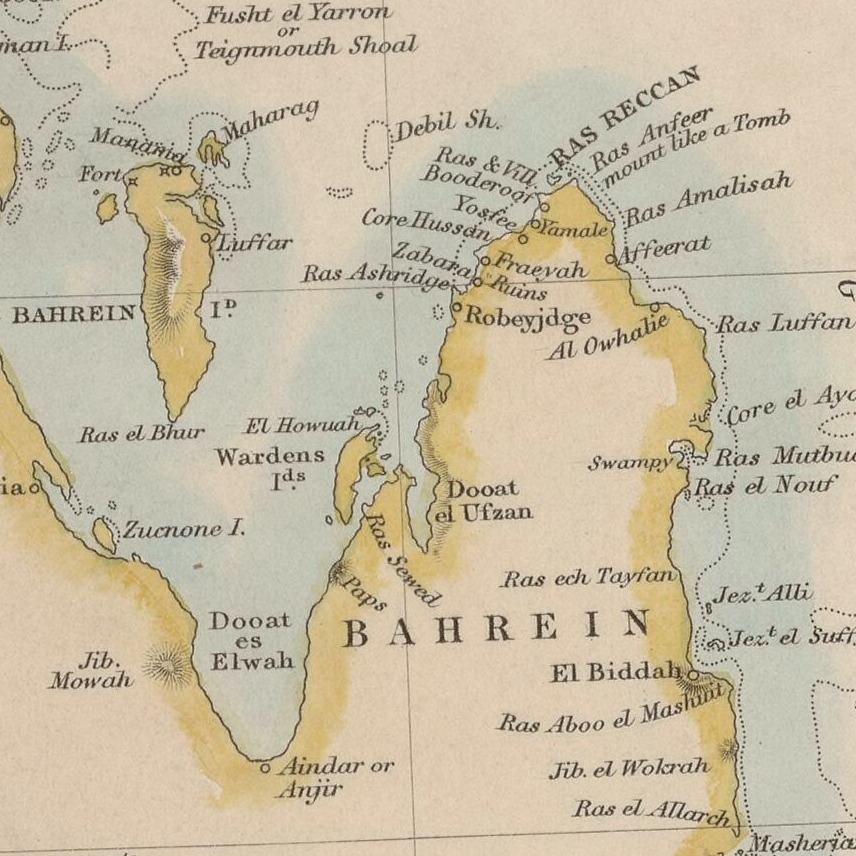
- Map of Bahrain in 1849
Date	1867–1868
Location	Qatar and the Gulf of Bahrain
Result	Ceasefire: British intervention and signing of the Anglo-Bahraini Treaty of 1868; Deposal of Muhammad bin Khalifa as king of Bahrain; British recognition of Al-Thani jurisdiction over Qatar
Territorial changes	Independence of Qatar from Bahrain

Belligerents
Qatar	Bahrain (Emirate of Abu Dhabi) Abu Dhabi (1867)

Commanders and leaders
Jassim bin Mohammed Al Thani	Muhammad bin Khalifa; Ali bin Khalifa; Ahmed bin Mohammed Al Khalifa †; Zayed bin Khalifa Al Nahyan

Strength
Unknown	1867: 700 men 24 dhows 2,000 men 70 dhows

Casualties and losses
Unknown	Unknown
- Al-Bidda' and Wakrah sacked (1867); 1,000 killed, 60 dhows destroyed (1868)

The Qatari–Bahraini War (Arabic: الحرب القطرية البحرينية), also known as the Qatari War of Independence (Arabic: حرب الاستقلال القطرية), was an armed conflict that took place in 1867 and 1868 in the Persian Gulf. The conflict pitted Bahrain and Abu Dhabi against Qatar. The conflict was the most flagrant violation of the 1835 maritime truce, requiring British intervention. The two emirates agreed to a truce, mediated by the United Kingdom, which led to Britain recognizing the Al-Thani family of Qatar as the semi-independent rulers of Qatar. The conflict resulted in wide-scale destruction in both emirates.

== Background ==
In the mid-18th century, the current ruling family of Bahrain – the House of Khalifa – migrated from Kuwait to Qatar, where they established a thriving town in Zubarah. Following the Bani Utbah invasion of Bahrain in 1783, in which Zubarah-based tribes conquered the Bahrain islands from the Persians, the Al Khalifa assumed control of both Bahrain and Zubarah, with Ahmed bin Muhammad bin Khalifa ruling from the latter until his death in 1796. His heirs would rule from Bahrain, where they continued to exert authority over mainland Qatar. The Al Khalifa signed a treaty with the British in 1820, guaranteeing their recognition as Bahrain's rulers.

The 1835 maritime truce was agreed among individual Arab emirates such as Abu Dhabi, Sharjah, the rest of the Trucial States, Bahrain and Oman. The truce was supervised by the British Royal Navy (notably the Bombay Marine). In order to enforce a pre-existing peace treaty (the General Maritime Treaty of 1820), the Bombay Marine deployed squadrons to the Persian Gulf, based in Qeshm Island. The treaty prohibited piracy in the Persian Gulf but it did not outlaw maritime warfare. Qatar, treated as a dependency of Bahrain, was also party to the treaty.

While the Al Khalifa continued to view Qatar as a dependency, the emerging House of Thani, under Mohammed bin Thani, began to gain significant political weight on the peninsula after the tribe migrated from Fuwayrit to Al Bidda in 1848. Their rise in influence was precipitated by the Battle of Mesaimeer in 1851, in which Thani led local Qatari tribes to defect from Bahrain to the Emirate of Nejd prior to a peace deal preserving the status quo, resulting in a power struggle between the Al Khalifa and the Al Thani over the proceeding years.

== Chronology ==
=== Prelude ===
In the 1850s and 60s, the relations between Qatar and Bahrain deteriorated with a series of disputes, beginning with the Battle of Mesaimeer in June 1851 when Qatari tribes switched allegiances from the Bahrainis to Faisal bin Turki of the Wahhabi Emirate of Nejd. The next month, a peace agreement was reached which saw dominion over Qatar returned to the Bahrainis in exchange for an annual zakat paid to the Wahhabi ruler. The battle created political enmity between Qatar and Bahrain which contributed to the start of the war. The antagonism between the Qataris and Bahrainis persisted, exacerbated by the Al Khalifa's presumption that their annual tribute of 4,000 riyals to the Wahhabis had effectively purchased Qatar and its tribes. They appointed Ahmed bin Mohammed Al Khalifa as their representative in Qatar. Despite his marital ties to the Al Thani family, Ahmed's harsh treatment of the Qataris created widespread resentment.

=== Al Wakrah Incidents (1866–1867) ===
In 1866, a dispute occurred in the Qatari town of Al Wakrah when the Bahraini governor's representative, Ahmed bin Mohammed Al Khalifa, assaulted several members of the Na'im tribe and confiscated their belongings in what would be colloquially referred to as the first of the "Al Wakrah Incidents". The Na'im caravan, which had been preparing for the customary pearl diving expedition, resisted the attack, leading to the arrest of their leader, Ali bin Thamer, who was subsequently deported to Bahrain and imprisoned upon arrival.

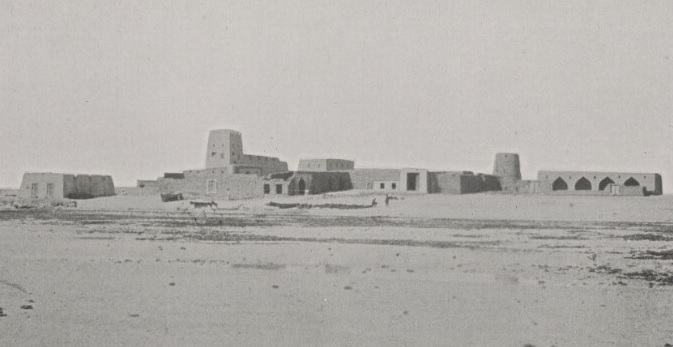
Al Wakrah Fort, pictured in 1908

In 1867, the tribal elders appealed to Sheikh Jassim bin Mohammed Al Thani, who was recognized as a leader among the local tribes, for assistance. Jassim bin Mohammed then mobilized a general levy of Qatari forces and marched on Al Wakrah, seeking to apprehend the Bahraini representative Ahmed Al Khalifa, who took shelter in Al Wakrah Fort. The besieging forces intensified their efforts to the point where they nearly captured the fortress.

Lacking sufficient defenses, Ahmed Al Khalifa fled during the night with a small group of retainers, descending from the rear of the fortress to the seashore with the assistance of a local tribal leader, Rashid bin Mubarak Al Khater of the Al-Buainain clan. From there he made his way to Al Khuwayr, a village in northern Qatar, from where he dispatched a message to the ruler of Bahrain reporting the events. During the escape, one of his companions, Abdulmohsen bin Abdulaziz Al Khalifa, drowned in the sea.

=== Imprisonment of Jassim bin Mohammed (1867) ===
According to Qatari accounts, Bahraini ruler Sheikh Muhammad bin Khalifa invited Jassim bin Mohammed to Bahrain in 1867 with a conciliatory letter that criticized the Bahraini representative and conveyed assurances of goodwill. He also released the imprisoned Na'im chief, Ali bin Thamer, to reinforce this gesture. Qatari sources, however, characterize the invitation as an act of deception, as Jassim bin Mohammed was seized and imprisoned upon arrival. The Bahraini narrative instead portrays the episode as a response to what was perceived as insolent correspondence and threats of shifting allegiance to the Emirate of Najd, with Jassim bin Mohammed said to have traveled to Bahrain to seek pardon but subsequently imprisoned by Muhammad bin Khalifa for his perceived transgressions.

Subsequently, Muhammad bin Khalifa assembled a naval fleet to raid Qatar, triggering the war. Bahrain succeeded in gaining support from Abu Dhabi, as Doha and Al Wakrah had long been harbors of refuge for seceders and dissidents from the Trucial Coast.

=== Second Destruction of Doha (1867) ===
The conflict escalated between the two parties in the following year. In October 1867, the Bahraini ruler Muhammad bin Khalifa sent his brother, Ali bin Khalifa, with a force of 500 men in 24 boats to attack Qatar. He was joined by a force of 200 men under Ahmed Al Khalifa. Additionally, Bahrain's ally Abu Dhabi under Sheikh Zayed bin Khalifa Al Nahyan sent 2,000 troops in 70 boats. This contingent established a base in Ra’s Abū ‘Umrān, near Ar-Ruʼays in northern Qatar, from which Bahraini and Abu Dhabi forces advanced towards Doha, the epicenter of the insurgency. The attack on Qatar led to the sacking of Bidda (Doha) and Wakrah.

According to historical accounts, the assault on Doha was characterized by its suddenness and ferocity. As reported by Muḥammad ibn Kahlīfa al-Nabhānī in The Nabhani offering on the history of the Arabian Peninsula (1924): "They wielded their swords against the unsuspecting inhabitants, compelling them to flee, abandoning their homes and possessions. The population dispersed, and the town of Doha, then the capital of Qatar, was laid to ruin. This incident came to be known as the Second Destruction of Doha, occurring in 1283 AH (1866 CE)."

A British record later stated "the towns of Doha and Wakrah were, at the end of 1867 temporarily blotted out of existence, the houses being dismantled and the inhabitants deported".

The primary instigator of these hostilities was identified as Ahmed Al Khalifa. In the aftermath of the attack, he was pursued by remnants of the fleeing Na'im tribe. They eventually confronted him in the Battle of Hamrour, where Ahmed Al Khalifa was defeated and killed. The historian Al-Nabhani describes the outcome of this encounter: "The two groups dispersed equally," suggesting a mutually destructive engagement that left both sides significantly weakened.

=== Battle of Al Damsah (1868) ===
In June 1868, the Qataris attempted to launch a counterattack against the Bahrainis, however, they were defeated. The commander who organized the attack was Nasser bin Jabr, chief of the Na'im tribe. While en route to the Bahrain islands, they chanted:

حُرِّم عليك الصلحِ منا
ما دام قاسِم في الحديد
لا بد ما تارِد سفنّا
بالسيفِ مصقول الحديد!

Translation:

Peace with us is forbidden to you
As long as Jassim is in chains
We must reclaim our ships
With a sword of polished steel!

Contemporary sources state the 1868 attack was particularly violent, with some 1,000 killed and 60 ships destroyed. A brief account of the battle written in 1933 by C.U. Aitchison, under-secretary of the British Raj, is as follows:

As both the Bahrain and Abu Dhabi Shaikhs were bound by their engagements with the British Government to abstain from aggression of every kind by sea; [...] steps were taken to exact reparation for these outrages. Before this could be effected the tribes of Qatar retaliated by an attack on Bahrain which proved unsuccessful; but in the naval action which took place a number of vessels were destroyed and great loss of life occurred.

According to the historian Al-Nabhani, as the Qatari force approached the island, they found the Bahraini navy already mobilized and awaiting battle. The two fleets engaged near a location in Bahraini waters known as Al Damsah, with the ships of both sides locking together using iron grappling hooks. Combatants stormed opposing decks and hand-to-hand clashes followed, with many falling into the sea amid the struggle. Al-Nabhani stated, "the waters turned red with blood" owing to the intensity of the fighting and claimed that the engagement ended in a resounding defeat of the Qatari forces.

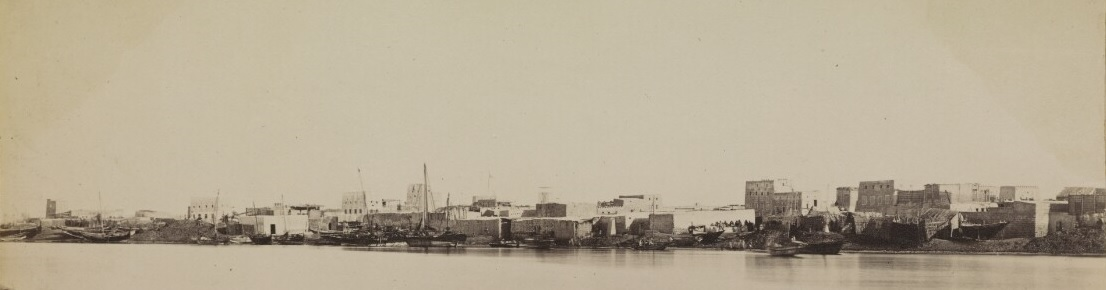
Manama harbour, Bahrain, c. 1870.

=== Battle of Jebel Wakrah (1868) ===
The aftermath of the Battle of Damsah saw the Qatari forces execute a strategic withdrawal to Jebel Al Wakrah on Al Wakrah's coastline, prompting a pursuit by Bahraini troops. The Qatari contingent successfully mounted a defense, encircling the Bahraini forces and capturing two of their commanders. The engagement concluded with a negotiated exchange of prisoners, following which Jassim bin Mohammed returned to his seat of power in Doha.

== Anglo-Bahraini agreement of 1868 ==
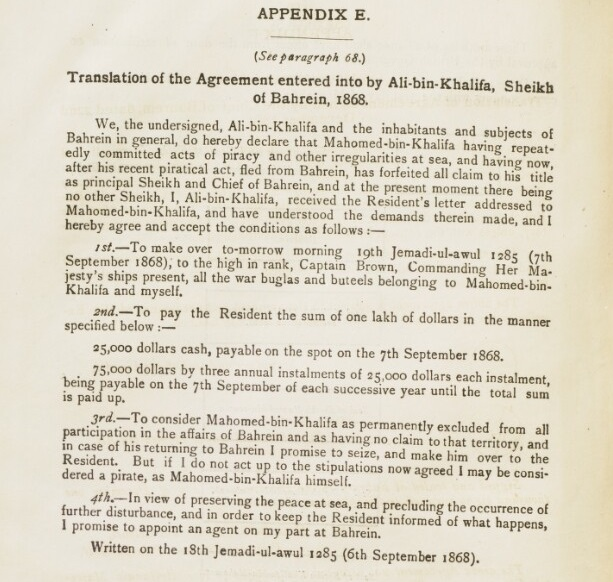
The agreement between Britain and Bahrain in September 1868 as an aftermath to the Qatari–Bahraini War.

Prior to 1867, the British recognized Qatar as a Bahraini dependency. Lieutenant Colonel Lewis Pelly, the British Resident in Bahrain, issued an ultimatum to Muhammad bin Khalifa, accusing him of violating the maritime law and demanding reparations of 10,000 Iranian tomans. On 6 September 1868, Ali bin Khalifa effectively took control of Bahrain as hakim after Colonel Pelly appointed him, after his brother Muhammad fled.

The dispute led to the British recognizing the Al Thani for the first time as a semi-independent political unit in Qatar. Lewis Pelly visited Al Wakrah, Qatar, where he met the sheikhs and signed the Treaty of 1868 with Mohammed bin Thani. The treaty ended the maritime warfare. As part of the treaty's conditions, Bahrain was forced to renounce claims of sovereignty on Qatari soil as well as accept several British penalties, most of which were financial.

== See also ==
- Bahrain–Qatar relations
- List of conflicts in the Near East
