= Fuad Khuri =

Lebanese anthropologist and writer

Fuad Ishaq Khuri
- فؤاد الخوري
- Fuad Khuri
- Born: 1935; Beirut, Lebanon
- Died: 4 May 2003 (aged 67–68)
- Occupation: Anthropologist
- Years active: 40 years
- Notable work: From Village to Suburb: Order and Change in Greater Beirut, Tribe and State in Bahrain

Fuad Ishaq Khuri (Arabic: فؤاد الخوري; 1935 – 4 May 2003) was a Lebanese anthropologist and writer. He was professor of anthropology at the American University of Beirut in Lebanon from 1964 to 1987. Due to the worsening Lebanese civil war at the time, Khuri left the country for the United Kingdom and held a series of visiting professorships at the London School of Economics, University of Manchester, University of Chicago and the University of Oregon.

His books From Village to Suburb and Tribe and State in Bahrain are considered pioneering works in the field of Arab anthropology. Khuri was widely considered as a prominent scholar on Arab sociology and politics.

== Biography ==
Khuri was born in 1935 as a Lebanese Christian. He earned both his Bachelor's and Master's degree in anthropology at the American University of Beirut (AUB). In 1964, Khuri completed his PhD in social anthropology at the University of Oregon, with his thesis being on the influence of men in Magburaka, Sierra Leone. He later joined AUB as an instructor in the same year and was later promoted to assistant professor in 1965. Khuri became associate professor in 1971, placed on tenure in 1972, and then promoted to professor in 1978. As a professor, he served multiple terms as chairperson of the university's Department of Sociology and the Department of Social and Behavioral Sciences.

In 1975, Khuri published From Village to Suburb: Order and Change in Greater Beirut, widely regarded as a pioneering case study of suburbs in the Middle East by an Arab anthropologist. In particular, his analysis of suburbs in relation to Middle Eastern classes of sect, family, and social class was well-received. In 1980, he published Tribe and State in Bahrain, a detailed sociopolitical analysis of the Middle East's smallest country based on a year-long field trip undertaken by Khuri in 1974-75. The book chronicles Bahrain's pre-modern history and proved controversial to the Bahraini government as the book was banned in the country despite high demand.

Due to escalations in the Lebanese civil war in 1987, Khuri resigned as professor and relocated with his family to the town of Reading, England. From 1987 to 1992, he worked as the director of the Issam Fares Foundation on behalf of his Lebanese friend and businessman, Issam Fares. After 1992, he began to solely concentrate on academia. Over the course of his career, Khuri authored 17 books and 40 articles on Arab culture.

=== Personal life ===
Fuad Khuri was married to Sonia Jalbout Khuri, an AUB graduate of mathematics who taught the field in both Lebanon and the UK. She also worked as Fuad's research assistant and editor to his books. In his later years while stricken with illness, Sonia would accompany Fuad on his field trips and scribe his notes. Khuri died on 4 May 2003 at the age of 68 and was survived by his wife and two children.

== Bibliography ==
- Khuri, Fuad (1 May 1975). From village to suburb : order and change in greater Beirut. University of Chicago Press. ISBN 9780226434711.
- Khuri, Fuad (1980). Tribe and state in Bahrain : the transformation of social and political authority in an Arab state. University of Chicago Press. ISBN 0226434737.
- Khuri, Fuad (1982). Leadership and Development in Arab Society. Syracuse University Press. ISBN 9780815660606.
- Khuri, Fuad (1990). Imams and emirs : state, religion, and sects in Islam. Saqi Books. ISBN 9780863560378.
- Khuri, Fuad (1990). Tents and pyramids : games and ideology in Arab culture from backgammon to autocratic rule. Saqi Books. ISBN 9780863563348.
- Khuri, Fuad (2000). The body in Islamic culture. Saqi. ISBN 9780863569746.
- Khuri, Fuad (2004). Being a Druze. Druze Heritage Foundation. ISBN 9781904850014.
- Khuri, Fuad (2007). An invitation to laughter : a Lebanese anthropologist in the Arab world. University of Chicago Press. ISBN 9780226434780.
