= Diriyah expedition to Riyadh =

Date	1746–1773
Location	Riyadh, Saudi Arabia
Result	Saudi victory
Territorial changes	Expansion of the First Saudi State

Belligerents
First Saudi State	Tribes of Riyadh

Commanders and leaders
(First Saudi State) Muhammad bin Saud Al Muqrin (First Saudi State) Abdulaziz bin Muhammad Al Saud	Daham bin Dewas (AWOL)

Strength
Unknown	Unknown

Casualties and losses
1,600	2,400

The Diriyah expedition to Riyadh, was a campaign waged by the Emirate of Diriyah against the tribes of Riyadh for an expansion; it lasted more than 28 years.

== Background ==
Uyayna, Manfuha, and Huraymila settlements voluntarily joined the Saudi government, later joined by Dhurma and Shaqra. The relationship between Riyadh and Diriyah before the establishment of the Saudi state was good and normal. Daham bin Dawas had a friendship and loyalty to Muhammad bin Saud due to his previous favor. However, the situation changed after Muhammad bin Abdul Wahhab moved to Diriyah. Sources indicate that when he saw the expansion of the state and the spread of Ibn Abdul Wahhab's call, he took a negative stance. He began to persecute those who followed the call from the people of Riyadh. The main reason for the Saudi state's desire to break Daham's influence was his attack on some countries that joined the state, such as Manfuha.

== Battle ==
During the reign of Imam Muhammad bin Saud and his son Abdulaziz, the Saudi state engaged in approximately thirty-five raids against Daham bin Dawas in Riyadh, spanning 28 years, during which about four thousand from both sides were killed. The end of these battles was in the year 1773, when Daham fled after the "Hudaym al-Marqab incident". Imam Abdulaziz bin Muhammad entered Riyadh, and his leadership was entrusted to Prince Abdullah bin Muqrin bin Muhammad bin Muqrin.
