= Khalid bin Saud Al Saud (1811–1865) =

Emir of Nejd and Head of the House of Saud (1811–1865) (r.1838-1841)

Emir of Nejd
- Reign: 1838–1841
- Predecessor: Faisal bin Turki
- Successor: Abdullah bin Thunayan
- Born: 1811
- Died: 1865 (aged 53–54)
Names
- Khalid bin Saud bin Abdulaziz bin Muhammad bin Saud
- House: Al Saud
- Father: Saud bin Abdulaziz

Khalid bin Saud bin Abdulaziz Al Saud (Arabic: خالد بن سعود بن عبد العزيز آل سعود; 1811–1865) ruled the Second Saudi State, known as the Emirate of Najd, for three years, from 1838 to 1841. His reign was part of plans by Muhammad Ali Pasha, ruler of Egypt, to dominate Arabia following his capture of Syria in 1831. Khalid was the great-grandson of Muhammad bin Saud, founder of the Al Saud dynasty, and second cousin of Faisal bin Turki bin Abdullah, another ruler of the Second Saudi State.

== Early life ==
Khalid was born in 1811. He was the youngest son of Saud bin Abdulaziz and the brother of Abdullah bin Saud who was beheaded in Istanbul in 1819. Khalid had four other brothers: Mishari, Turki, Nasser and Saad. Following the capture of Diriyah and of his elder brother Abdullah, ruler of Diriyah, Khalid and his family were sent to Egypt in May 1819. In the same incident his three brothers were killed by Ibrahim Pasha. Khalid stayed for nearly eighteen years in Egypt where he was educated under the patronage of Muhammad Ali Pasha.

Khalid returned to Riyadh in late 1836 or in May 1837. Muhammad Ali Pasha ordered the governor of Medina, Ismail Pasha, to provide Khalid military assistance, and then Khalid initiated his advance into Qasim.

== Reign and death ==
Khalid and his cousin, Faisal bin Turki, fought in Riyadh in 1838, and Khalid defeated Faisal. Then Faisal was arrested by the Ottoman forces through Egyptians and sent to Cairo. As a result, Khalid was named as the ruler by the Ottomans. In fact, the Ottomans appointed him as their Riyadh deputy. Although there was no revolt against Khalid's rule among locals, the Wahhabi figures and the members of the Al Sheikh family did not declare their allegiance to him. Instead, they fled Riyadh and moved to Al Hariq where the Egyptian forces did not exist.

Locals in Al Qassim announced their loyalty to Khalid, but at the same time they began to gain their independence from the Emirate of Najd during Khalid's reign. Because at the beginning of his rule Al Qassim leaders signed an agreement, London Convention, with the Ottoman Empire through which they secured the removal of the Egyptian pashas from their region. Khalid also managed to have power in the Eastern regions and sent Saad bin Mutlaq to Oman to take the region, but his attempt was not success. In 1840 Khalid sent a letter to the British resident in Bahrain asking to revive the relations with the British that had existed, but he was not given a positive response.

Khalid could not fully consolidate his power and gain full acceptance of the tribes. His reign that was exclusively backed by the Egyptians did not last so long. Khalid lost the power when the Egyptian troops left Najd as a result of the pressure of the British authorities. In fact, the Egyptian troops had to leave the region as a result of the protocol signed between the Ottoman government and the British government on 15 July 1840. In December 1841 Khalid was replaced by Abdullah bin Thunayan who was a great-grandson of Muhammad bin Saud’s brother. Khalid attempted to retake the rulership, but following his fruitless attempts he gave up and found refuge in Hejaz. Khalid was given a pension by the Ottomans until his death in 1865.

Regnal titles
Preceded by Faisal bin Turki bin Abdullah Al Saud	Emir of Nejd; 1838–1841	Succeeded by Abdullah bin Thunayyan Al Saud
