= Abdullah bin Thunayan Al Saud =

Emir of Nejd and Head of the House of Saud (r.1841-1843)

Emir of Nejd
- Reign: 1841–May 1843
- Predecessor: Khalid bin Saud bin Abdulaziz Al Saud
- Successor: Faisal bin Turki bin Abdullah Al Saud
- Died: July 1843; Riyadh
- Burial: Riyadh
- Issue: Abdullah bin Abdullah Al Saud
Names
- Abdullah bin Thunayan bin Ibrahim bin Thunayan bin Saud
- House: House of Saud
- Father: Thunayan bin Ibrahim bin Thunayan bin Saud bin Muhammad Al Muqrin

Abdullah bin Thunayan Al Saud (Arabic: عبد الله بن ثنيان آل سعود, romanized: ʿAbd Allāh ibn Ṯunayān Āl Suʿūd; died July 1843) was Emir of Nejd from 1841 to May 1843. He is the sole member of the Al Thunayan branch of the Al Saud who became emir.

== Early years ==
Abdullah bin Thunayan was a great-grandson of Thunayan bin Saud, who was the brother of Muhammad bin Saud, founder of the Emirate of Diriyah. Therefore, he was a great-great-grandson of the founder of the Al Saud dynasty, Saud bin Muhammad.

Until 1841 Abdullah was in southern Iraq under the protection of the Muntafiq tribe. It was at that time that he first came to Hejaz and made several unsuccessful attempts to capture the Emirate of Nejd.

== Reign ==
Abdullah's third cousin Khalid bin Saud, the Emir of Nejd, had been backed by the Egyptians and lost power when they had to leave Nejd in 1840. Finally Abdullah ousted Emir Khalid in December 1841. Abdullah's major supporter was the ruler of Al Hariq, Turki Al Hazzani. He was also supported by the descendants of Muhammad ibn Abd al-Wahhab and other significant tribal leaders who regarded Khalid bin Saud as an illegitimate ruler due to his alliance with the Egyptians. As a result of this support Abdullah was titled as imam. He ruled the emirate from Riyadh.

In 1842 Bahraini royal Mohammed bin Khalifa asked help from Abdullah following his defeat at al Nasfah battle against the ruler of Bahrain, Abdullah bin Ahmad Al Khalifa. He was granted asylum, but not military assistance. In 1843 Faisal bin Turki bin Abdullah Al Saud, another third cousin of Abdullah was released by the Egyptians in Cairo and managed to regain the rulership of the Emirate in May 1843.

== Death and personal life ==
Abdullah did not endorse the leadership of Faisal and was imprisoned in Al Masmak fortress where he died of poisoning in July 1843. He was buried in Riyadh following the funeral prayers led by Imam Faisal bin Turki.

One of Abdullah's sons was born on the same day he died. Due to this, he was also named Abdullah. He was the father of Ahmed bin Abdullah Al Thunayan and paternal grandfather of Iffat bint Mohammad Al Thunayan.

Regnal titles
| Preceded by Khalid bin Saud bin Abdulaziz Al Saud | Emir of Nejd; 1841–1843 | Succeeded by Faisal bin Turki bin Abdullah Al Saud |
