= Perpetual Truce of Peace and Friendship =

1861 treaty between the United Kingdom and Bahrain

The Perpetual Truce of Peace and Friendship was a treaty that went into effect in 1861 between the United Kingdom and Bahrain.

According to its terms, Britain would provide protection from naval assault and assistance for land assaults in return for pledges from Bahrain to only dispose of land to the United Kingdom (if to anyone) and not to enter relationships with other foreign governments without British consent. The treaty was modified in 1892 and 1951.
