= Saeed bin Tahnun Al Nahyan =

- Sheikh

Ruler of Abu Dhabi
- Reign: 1845–January 1855
- Predecessor: Khalifa bin Shakhbut Al Nahyan
- Successor: Zayed bin Khalifa Al Nahyan
- Died: 1855
- Issue: unknown daughter
- House: Al Nahyan
- Father: Tahnun bin Shakhbut Al Nahyan

Sheikh Saeed bin Tahnun Al Nahyan was the ruler of Abu Dhabi, one of the Trucial States which today form the United Arab Emirates (UAE), from 1845 to 1855.

== Accession ==
Saeed acceded following the murder of his uncle, Sheikh Khalifa bin Shakhbut Al Nahyan. The murder led to a period of fighting for the leadership of the Bani Yas, with Sheikh Khalifa's maternal nephew and murderer, Isa bin Khalid Al Falahi attempting to take power but being himself killed by Dhiyab bin Isa. Khalid bin Isa then murdered Dhiyab and fled to Sharjah, leaving two influential leaders of the Bani Yas, Mohammed bin Humaid and Rashid bin Fadhil, to remove a claimant to the fort of Abu Dhabi, one of Khalifa's brothers, and nominate a son of the former leader Tahnun bin Shakhbut Al Nahyan, Saeed bin Tahnun.

Saeed arrived in Abu Dhabi to a smooth accession, supported by his two influential sponsors as well as the approval of the British. Additionally, he contracted an early alliance with Sharjah and Ras Al Khaimah's dynastically-inclined ruler, Sultan bin Saqr Al Qasimi, his Uncle's old adversary but an ally against the Saudi presence looming in Buraimi.

He quickly moved to quell a disturbance in 1849 among the formerly secessionist Qubaisat and brought them to Abu Dhabi, stripped their boats and compelled them to pay their debts, return to the rule of Abu Dhabi and additionally pay a fine.

== Buraimi ==
Saeed moved on Buraimi on 4 May 1848, capturing his two forts back from the Saudi Wahhabis with the help of both the Dhawahir and Awamir tribes, as well as the Na'im. He then pulled together the Bani Qitab, Ghafalah, Awamir and Bani Yas in Khatam and placed the Manasir and Mazari Bani Yas in Dhafrah to block the relieving Wahhabi army under Sa'ad bin Mutlaq. By 1850, Saeed's great tribal association had cleared Burami Oasis of Wahhabi forces. He subsequently accepted a stipend from the Sultan of Muscat for the defence of Buraimi.

With the Al Qasimi under Sultan bin Saqr opposed to the Sultan of Muscat and allied to the Saudis. Saeed bin Tahnun (who was himself in alliance with Sultan bin Saqr) was allied to Muscat and opposed to the Saudis. He sent a force to Muscat to support the Sultan against an Al Qasimi attack on Shinas in March 1850, consisting of some 400 Bani Yas and Manasir. Saeed also raised a force against Buraimi, destroying the aflaj in order to deprive the Saudi garrison of water. His position was briefly threatened by the raising of an army from Sharjah, Dubai, Ajman and Umm Al Quwain, but that force eventually (after much disagreement between the leaders) moved east to the Batinah, where it instead picked a fight with the governor of Sohar and the Sultan at Muscat. The end result of this conflict was to cede Kalba and Khor Fakkan to Sultan bin Saqr Al Qasimi, while Dubai backed the Sultan in Muscat and recovered Sohar and Shinas for him.

Despite Saeed bin Tahnun’s occupation of Buraimi and the raising of a complex federation of tribal forces to annex the whole oasis, the arrival of the Saudi Ruler’s son – Abdullah bin Faisal Al Saud – in early 1853 was to lead to a general gathering of the Trucial Sheikhs (except Saeed bin Butti of Dubai, who was fearful of Saudi retribution) to meet the representative of the powerful Saudi state – Abdullah bin Faisal wanted to move his Saudi forces against Sohar, supported by Sultan bin Saqr Al Qasimi but it was Saeed bin Tahnun who managed to arrange a negotiated peace between Sohar and the new Saudi agent, Ahmed Al Sudairi.

== Battle of Mesaimeer ==
Saeed bin Tahnun played a significant role in the Battle of Mesaimeer, a conflict that occurred in Qatar from June 2-4, 1851. This battle was fought between Qatari-Bahraini forces, led by Mohammed bin Thani and Ali bin Khalifa Al Khalifa, and the invading army of Faisal bin Turki, Imam of Emirate of Nejd. At this time, Qatar was considered a nominal dependency of Bahrain, and Faisal bin Turki was attempting to stage an invasion of Bahrain from the peninsula. Ali bin Khalifa, the Bahraini representative in Qatar, made overtures towards Saeed requesting assistance, and again wrote to him on 18 May, 1851, stressing the need for immediate reinforcements as Faisal's forces were a mere two days away from Al Bidda. Saeed obliged his request and rendezvoused with Ali bin Khalifa in Al Bidda.

Heavy gunfire was exchanged on 2 June near Al Bidda between the allied and Wahhabi forces, with the allied forces successfully repelling the initial invasion. On 3 June, the forces of Ali bin Khalifa and Saeed retreated to their ships and observed the ensuing close-combat skirmishes between Qatari and Wahhabi forces from sea. On the final day of battle, Faisal's forces retreated to their camp in Mesaimeer. Shortly after the final day of battle, Mohammed bin Thani sent a letter to Faisal's camp requesting peace and agreeing to be his subject, to which Faisal obliged. On 8 June, Qatari forces assumed control of Burj Al-Maah, a watchtower guarding Al Bidda's main water source, close to Al Bidda Fort where the allied forces of Ali bin Khalifa and Saeed were stationed. Upon hearing the news, they fled to Bahrain without incident.

Following the battle, tensions remained high between the various factions. Saeed, who maintained cordial relations with both the Bahraini rulers and the Qatari leadership, emerged as a key mediator in the ensuing diplomatic efforts. His involvement was prompted by concerns shared with other rulers of the Trucial Coast, particularly the Sultan of Muscat and the Sheikh of Sharjah, regarding the potential threat posed by Faisal's prolonged presence in Qatar.

In the third week of July 1851, Saeed arrived in Al Bidda (modern-day Doha) to facilitate negotiations. He successfully brokered a peace agreement by 25 July. The terms of this accord included:

- Ali bin Khalifa of Bahrain agreeing to pay an annual zakat of 4,000 German krones to Faisal bin Turki.
- Faisal pledging to restore the fort of Al Bidda to Bahraini control.
- A commitment from Faisal to cease interference in Qatari affairs.

Saeed personally traveled to Bahrain to secure Mohammad bin Khalifa's ratification of the agreement. His diplomatic efforts were crucial in de-escalating the conflict and restoring a measure of stability to the region. The successful mediation led to Faisal's departure from Qatar on 26 July, 1851, the lifting of the Bahraini blockade of Qatif and Al Bidda, and the withdrawal of British naval forces from the area.

== Perpetual Maritime Truce ==
Saeed was a signatory to the 1853 Perpetual Maritime Truce with the British. The treaty followed the ten year treaty of peace, intended to protect the pearling fleets during the annual fishing seasons, proposed by Samuel Hennell. The 1853 Treaty, signed with Captain Arnold Burrowes Kemball, the British Resident at Bushire was to be, as the name suggests, in perpetuity and signed between 4 and 9 May 1853 by Saeed bin Tahnun together with Abdullah bin Rashid Al Mualla of Umm Al Quwain; Humaid bin Rashid Al Nuaimi of Ajman; Saeed bin Butti Al Maktoum of Dubai and Sultan bin Saqr Al Qasimi, ‘Chief of the Joasmees’.

== Uprising ==
In 1855, Saeed bin Tahnun was embroiled in a dispute involving the murder by a tribal elder of the man's brother. The murder was considered not without justification but Saeed was deaf to the imprecations of the Bani Yas and resolved to have the killer put to death. A promise was made to the man of forgiveness, but when he was brought into Saeed's presence, Saeed drew out his own dagger and killed the man. The resulting violent uprising drove Saeed to take refuge first in his fort and then to exile on the island of Qish.

The Bani Yas now selected a successor to Saeed, unanimously appointing Saeed’s cousin, Zayed bin Khalifa Al Nahyan, to rule them.

Saeed bin Tahnun Al Nahyan House of Al Nahyan Died: 1855
Regnal titles
Preceded by Sheikh Khalifa bin Shakhbut	Ruler of Abu Dhabi; 1845–1855	Succeeded by Sheikh Zayed bin Khalifa
