= Faisal bin Turki Al Saud (1785–1865) =

Emir of Nejd and Head of the House of Saud (1785–1865)

Emir of Nejd
- Reign: 1843–1865
- Predecessor: Abdullah bin Thunayan
- Successor: Abdullah bin Faisal
- Reign: 1834–1838
- Predecessor: Mishari bin Abdul Rahman
- Successor: Khalid bin Saud
- Born: 1785
- Died: December 1865 (aged 79–80); Riyadh, Emirate of Nejd
- Issue: List: Abdullah; Saud; Muhammad; Abdul Rahman
Names
- Faisal bin Turki bin Abdullah bin Muhammad
- House: Al Saud
- Father: Turki bin Abdullah Al Saud

Faisal bin Turki Al Saud (Arabic: فيصل بن تركي آل سعود, romanized: Fayṣal ibn Turkī Āl Suʿūd; 1785 – December 1865) was the second ruler of the Second Saudi State and seventh head of the House of Saud.

== Early life ==
Faisal was the son of Imam Turki bin Abdullah. He was one of the members of the Al Saud family who was taken to Cairo following the capture of Diriyah by Ibrahim Pasha, son of Muhammad Ali, in May 1819. Faisal returned to Riyadh in 1827-1828.

In 1830 Faisal was sent on military operations to Al Hasa in the east. In his absence, his father was assassinated by Mishari bin Abdul Rahman, a second-cousin of his father in 1834. Faisal hurried back to Riyadh to deal with the revolt. His troops stormed the castle and killed Mishari. Emir of Jabal Shammar, Abdullah bin Rashid, helped Faisal in this attack. Those not directly involved in the murder were spared and the town pledged allegiance.

== Reign ==
=== Early reign and captivity ===
Imam Faisal first ruled the Second Saudi State from 1834 to 1838. Then he was forced into exile in Cairo by the Ottomans who sent an expedition to Najd due to his rejection of paying tribute to the Egyptian forces in Hejaz.

Faisal continued to oppose the Ottoman forces, however, and the Egyptian governor of Arabia, Khurshid Pasha, supported a rival candidate - Khalid bin Saud, a second-cousin of Faisal. Khalid was a member of the senior line of the Saud family. Faisal was forced to flee the city and take refuge with the al Khorayef princes of the Bani Tamim tribes. In December 1838, he attempted to come to terms with Khurshid Pasha, but was forced to return to captivity a second time in Cairo. He was accompanied by his younger brother Jiluwi, his sons, Abdullah and Muhammad, and his cousin, Abdullah bin Ibrahim bin Abdullah, a son of his uncle. In 1843, he was released in Cairo and returned to Riyadh following the total withdrawal of the remaining Egyptian troops from Najd in 1841.

=== Return to Riyadh ===
Following his return to Riyadh, Faisal reclaimed the throne in 1843 and ruled until 1865. He easily defeated his third-cousin Abdullah bin Thunayan, who had revolted against the ineffective Khalid and taken control. Faisal depended on a close alliance with the Al Rashid family of Ha'il. Abdullah bin Rashid played a key role in his success, and the two families were extensively intermarried. Early in his reign, Faisal appointed Abdullah as the Amir of Ha'il in 1835 in return for his loyalty. In his second term, Faisal also established cordial relations with the Ottomans who appointed him governor of Najd. In turn, Faisal recognised the supremacy of the Ottoman Empire in the region.

Faisal consolidated his power by subduing opposition tribes in Najd. This centralized authority required financial resources, prompting Faisal to target Al-Ahsa, Qatif, and Saihat—key economic hubs. He imposed his control over these regions, ensuring a steady flow of funds to his treasury by imposing what was termed zakat, though it functioned as a tax in contemporary terms.

Faisal's ambitions extended beyond these territories. In 1847, he attempted to intervene in Bahrain, exploiting internal conflicts within the ruling family. Although unsuccessful in capturing Bahrain, he settled for a peace agreement that included a tribute payment. His inability to seize Bahrain was primarily due to attacks on the Al-Qassim Province by Muhammad bin Awn and Khalid bin Saud, and the firm stance of the British government against Saudi expansion in the Persian Gulf. The British, who had substantial interests in the region, closely monitored Faisal's movements. Their support for the Bahraini sheikh and their strategic positions in the Gulf influenced the broader regional dynamics.

Faisal formally requested the support of the British Political Resident in Bushire through his representative in Trucial Oman in 1848.

=== Battle of Mesaimeer ===
The Battle of Mesaimeer was a significant military engagement in the Persian Gulf region, taking place from June 2-4, 1851, near the village of Mesaimeer in Qatar. Faisal bin Turki, having consolidated his power in central Arabia, sought to extend his influence to the Gulf coast, with the ultimate aim of controlling Bahrain and its lucrative pearl fisheries. His strategy involved using Qatar as a stepping stone for this expansion. This campaign, which began in May 1851, marked his third attempt at invading the island.

Opposing Faisal were the local Qatari tribes led by Mohammed bin Thani and his son Jassim bin Mohammed, progenitors of the future ruling family of Qatar. Although nominally allied with Bahrain, which was represented by the forces of Ali bin Khalifa, the Qatari forces acted largely independently during the battle. The engagement unfolded in three phases. On 2 June, initial clashes resulted in unexpected setbacks for Faisal's forces near Al Bidda (modern Doha). The next day, 3 June, witnessed intense fighting, with Qatari forces under Jassim bin Muhammad launching a determined close-quarters assault on Faisal's forces near Al Bidda. Finally, on 4 June, further engagements occurred, culminating in the retreat of Faisal's forces to their camp at Mesaimeer.

British sources, notably dispatches from political resident Samuel Hennell, confirm the defeat of Wahhabi forces on June 2 and 4. Shortly after the final day of battle, Mohammed bin Thani sent a letter to Faisal's camp requesting peace and agreeing to be his subject, to which Faisal obliged. On 8 June, Qatari forces assumed control of Burj Al-Maah, a watchtower guarding Doha's main water source, close to Al Bidda Fort where the forces of Ali bin Khalifa were stationed. Upon hearing the news, Ali bin Khalifa fled to Bahrain without incident, much to the dismay of Faisal who admonished Mohammed bin Thani for not capturing him.

Following British interference on the side of Bahrain in order to prevent the Ottoman Empire from gaining a stronghold in the Peninsula and the loss of his ally Mubarak in a major naval engagement near Qatif, Faisal was forced to reassess of his strategy. Relinquishing his designs upon Bahrain, Faisal made a conciliatory overture on 20 July, 1851, proposing to dispatch his two brothers and son to parley with Ali bin Khalifa aboard his ship. This proposal, however, met with unequivocal rejection from Ali bin Khalifa.

Due to the mediation efforts of Saeed bin Tahnun Al Nahyan, an agreement between Ali bin Khalifa and Faisal was reached on 25 July. The resultant accord stipulated that Ali would remit 4,000 German krones annually as zakat to Faisal, while the latter agreed to restore Al Bidda Fort to Ali bin Khalifa and to abstain from interference in Qatari affairs.

=== Later reign ===
Following unsuccessful attempts to gain authority in Al Qassim, Faisal appointed his younger brother Jiluwi governor to the region. However, Jiluwi did not manage to obtain full loyalty of people there who revolted against him 1854. During the 1850s Faisal unsuccessfully attempted to capture Oman and Bahrain. His next target was the Trucial States which he attacked in the 1860s. His both attempts were not fruitful, and the British forces militarily stopped his attacks. In 1865 a colonel in the British army, Lewis Pelly, officially visited Faisal in Riyadh.

=== Income ===
Faisal's major income sources included zakat, import duties, pilgrim fees, one-fifth share from raids and warfare, fines, revenues from the ruler’s personal domains, and tributes paid by neighbouring countries such as Bahrain and Muscat. He governed the Emirate with success until his death in December 1865. However, around the end of his rule the de facto ruler of the Emirate was his heir and son, Abdullah, and infighting among his four sons eventually destroyed the state.

== Personal life and death ==
Faisal bin Turki had four sons, Abdullah, Saud, Muhammad and Abdul Rahman. Of them Abdullah and Muhammad were full brothers so were Saud and Abdul Rahman. The mother of Abdullah and Muhammad was from the Al Saud whereas the mother of Saud and Abdul Rahman was from the Ajman tribe. One of his daughters married Rashidi Emir, Abdullah bin Rashid. Another, Tarfa, married Nasser Al Saud who was a great great grandson of Farhan bin Saud.

Faisal became very frail and blind during the later years. He died following a prolonged illness in Riyadh in December 1865 and was succeeded by his son Abdullah.

== For further reading ==
- Second State of Saudi Arabia

Regnal titles
Preceded by Mishari bin Abdul Rahman bin Mishari	Emir of Nejd; 1834–1838	Succeeded by Khalid bin Saud bin Abdulaziz Al Saud
Preceded by Abdullah bin Thunayyan bin Ibrahim Al Saud	Emir of Nejd; 1843–1865	Succeeded by Abdallah bin Faisal bin Turki
Preceded by Turki bin Abdallah	Head of the House of Saud; 1834–1865	Succeeded by Abdul Rahman bin Faisal
