= Second Saudi state =

1824–1891 state in Arabia Peninsula

Coordinates: 23°0′N 45°30′E

Emirate of Najd إمارة نجد (Arabic)
- 1824–1891
- Flag
- Capital: Riyadh
- Common languages: Najdi Arabic
- Government: Absolute monarchy
- Imam
  - 1824–1834: Turki bin Abdullah (first)
  - 1889–1891: Abdul Rahman bin Faisal (last)
- History
  - Reconquest of Riyadh: 1824
  - Battle of Mulayda against Emirate of Jabal Shammar: 24 January 1891
Preceded by	Succeeded by
Mu'ammarid Imamate	Emirate of Jabal Shammar; Najd Sanjak
- Today part of: Saudi Arabia; Qatar; Kuwait; United Arab Emirates; Bahrain

The second Saudi state (Arabic: الدَّوْلَةُ السُّعُودِيَّةُ الثَّانِيَةُ, romanized: ad-Dawla as-Suʿūdiyya ath-Thāniyya), officially known as the Emirate of Najd, was a state that existed between 1824 and 1891 in the Najd region of what is now Saudi Arabia. Saudi rule was restored to central (Najd) and Eastern Arabia after the first Saudi state having previously been brought down by the Ottoman Empire's Egypt Eyalet in the Ottoman–Wahhabi War.

The second Saudi period was marked by less territorial expansion and less religious zeal, although the Saudi leaders continued to be called Imam and still employed Wahhabist religious scholars. Turki bin Abdullah's reconquest of Riyadh from Ottoman-Egyptian forces in 1824 is generally regarded as the beginning of the second Saudi state. Severe internal conflicts within the House of Saud eventually led to the dynasty's downfall at the Battle of Mulayda in 1891, between the forces loyal to the last Saudi imam, Abdul Rahman bin Faisal, and the Rashidi dynasty of Hail.

== History ==
The first Saudi to attempt to regain power after the fall of the First Saudi state in 1818 was Mishari bin Saud, a brother of the last ruler in Diriyah, Abdullah ibn Saud but he was soon captured by Ottoman Egypt and killed. In 1824, Turki bin Abdullah, a grandson of the first Saudi imam Muhammad bin Saud who had managed to evade capture by the Ottomans, was able to expel Ottoman–Egyptian forces and their local allies from Riyadh and its environs and is generally regarded as the founder of the second Saudi dynasty as well as the ancestor of the kings of modern-day Saudi Arabia. He made his capital in Riyadh and was able to enlist the services of many relatives who had escaped captivity in Ottoman Egypt, including his son Faisal bin Turki.

Turki was assassinated in 1834 by order of Mishari bin Abdul Rahman, a distant cousin. Mishari was soon besieged in Riyadh and later executed by Faisal, who went on to become the most prominent ruler of the Saudis' second reign. Faisal, however, faced a re-invasion of Najd organised by Muhammad Ali. The local population was unwilling to resist, and Faisal was defeated and taken to Ottoman Egypt as a prisoner for the second time in 1838.

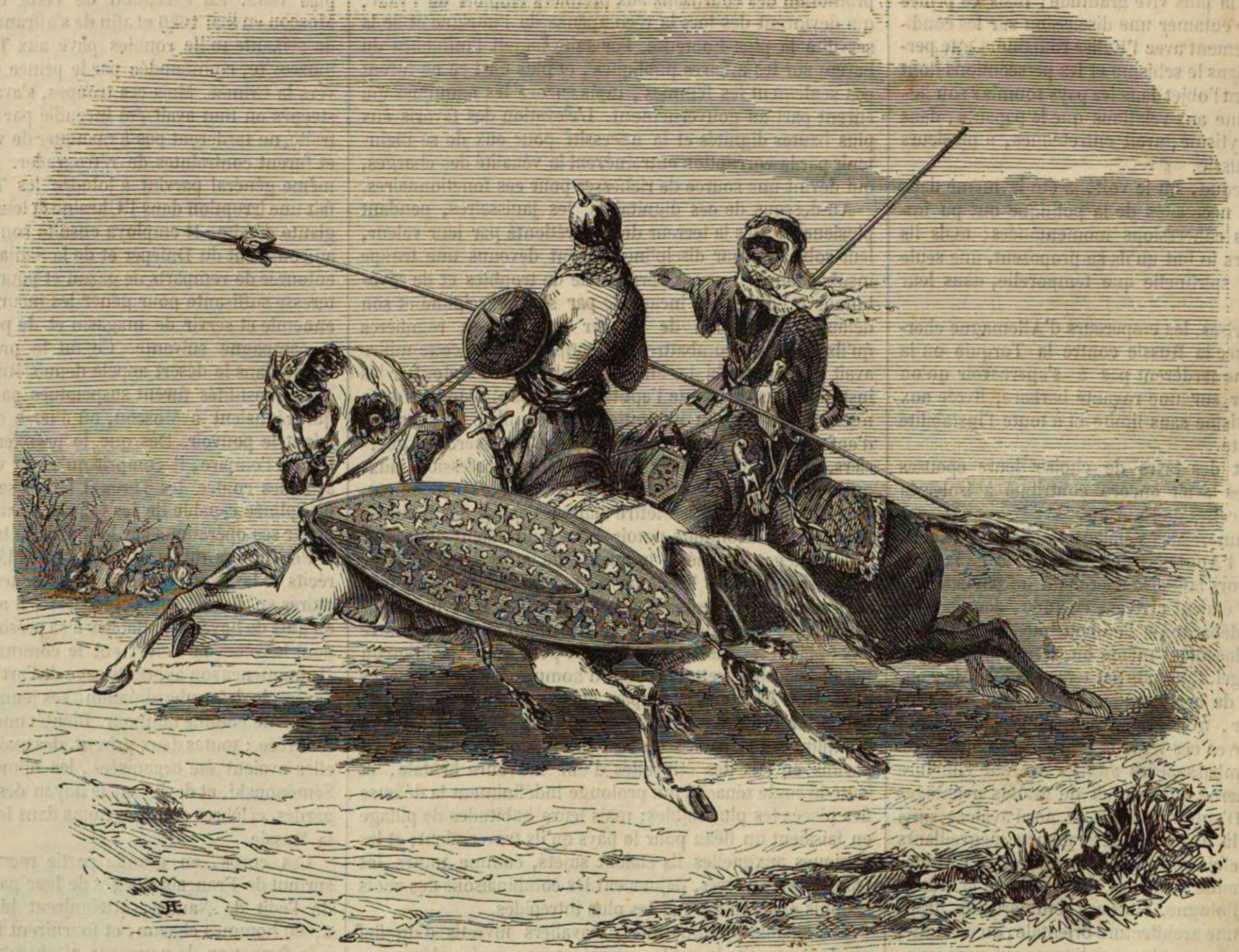
Two Saudi warriors on horseback, 1852

The Ottomans installed Khalid bin Saud, who had spent many years in the Ottomans–Egyptian court, as ruler in Riyadh and supported him with Ottomans–Egyptian troops. Khalid was the last surviving brother of Abdullah bin Saud bin Abdulaziz, a great-grandson of Muhammad ibn Saud. However, following the 1840 Convention of London imposed by European powers, the Ottoman Empire withdrew their military presence in the Arabian Peninsula, leaving Khalid with minimal support. Perceived by most locals as little more than an Ottoman–Egyptian governor, Khalid was toppled soon afterwards by Abdullah bin Thunayan, of the collateral Al Thunayan branch.

To restore equilibrium and counteract British influence, Muhammad Ali directed his aides to empower Faisal bin Turki, who had been imprisoned during his campaign in Najd, facilitating his escape from Ottoman Egypt. Faisal's return was seen as crucial for maintaining balance, given his rightful claim to rule in Najd, which had been under Abdullah bin Thunayan's control. Faisal's relationship with Muhammad Ali appears to have been pragmatic, governed by mutual interests.

Assisted by the House of Rashid rulers of Ha'il, Faisal swiftly eliminated his rival and retook Riyadh, resuming his rule. He later appointed his son Abdullah bin Faisal as heir apparent, and divided his dominions among his three sons Abdullah, Saud, and Muhammad. This time Faisal recognised Ottoman suzerainty and paid an annual tribute; in exchange he was recognised as "ruler of all the Arabs" by the Ottomans.

After regaining control, Faisal consolidated his power by subduing opposition tribes in Najd and forging alliances. This centralized authority required financial resources, prompting Faisal to target Al-Ahsa, Qatif, and Saihat—key economic hubs. He imposed his control over these regions, ensuring a steady flow of funds to his treasury by imposing what was termed zakat, though it functioned as a tax in contemporary terms.

Faisal's ambitions extended beyond these territories. In 1847, he attempted to intervene in Bahrain, exploiting internal conflicts within the ruling family. Although unsuccessful in capturing Bahrain, he settled for a peace agreement that included a tribute payment. His inability to seize Bahrain was primarily due to attacks on the Al-Qassim Province by Muhammad bin Awn and Khalid bin Saud, and the firm stance of the British government against Saudi expansion in the Persian Gulf. The British, who had substantial interests in the region, closely monitored Faisal's movements. Their support for the Bahraini sheikh and their strategic positions in the Gulf influenced the broader regional dynamics.

In the aftermath of the Battle of Mesaimeer in Qatar in June 1851, Faisal gained temporary dominion over Qatar, which was previously under Bahraini control. However, a peace agreement brokered by Saeed bin Tahnun Al Nahyan on 25 July stipulated that Ali bin Khalifa, the Bahraini representative in Qatar, would remit 4,000 German krones annually as zakat to Faisal, while the latter agreed to restore Al Bidda Fort to Ali bin Khalifa and to abstain from interference in Qatari affairs.

Upon Faisal's death in 1865 the state began to decline because different rulers, namely Abdullah, Saud, Abdul Rahman and Saud's sons, became the head of the state until 1891. Immediately following the death of Faisal, Abdullah assumed rule in Riyadh but was soon challenged by his brother, Saud. The two brothers fought a long civil war, in which they traded rule in Riyadh several times. A vassal of the Saudis, Muhammad bin Abdullah Al Rashid of Ha'il took the opportunity to intervene in the conflict and increase his own power. Gradually, Al Rashid extended his authority over most of Najd, including the Saudi capital, Riyadh. He finally expelled the last Saudi leader, Abdul Rahman bin Faisal, from Najd after the Battle of Mulayda in 1891.

== See also ==
- History of Saudi Arabia
- Unification of Saudi Arabia
- Sheikhdom of Diriyah
- First Saudi state
- Third Saudi state
