= Muhammad bin Saud Al Muqrin =

Founder of the Emirate of Diriyah and the Al Saud dynasty (1687–1765)

Emir of Diriyah
- Reign: 1727–1765
- Predecessor: Saud I
- Successor: Abdulaziz I
- Born: 1687; Diriyah
- Died: 1765 (aged 77–78); Diriyah
- Spouse: Moudi bint Abi Wahtan Al Kathir
- Issue: Abdulaziz; Faisal; Saud; Abdullah
Names
- Muhammad bin Saud bin Muhammad Al Muqrin Al Saud
- Dynasty: Mani'; Al Saud (founder)
- Father: Saud bin Muhammad Al Muqrin

Muhammad bin Saud Al Muqrin Al Saud (Arabic: محمد بن سعود آل مقرن, romanized: Muḥammad bin Suʿūd Āl Muqrin; 1687 – 1765), also known as Ibn Saud, was the emir of Diriyah and is considered the founder of the First Saudi State and the Saud dynasty, named after his father, Saud bin Muhammad Al Muqrin. His reign lasted between 1727 and 1765.

== Origins ==
Ibn Saud's family (then known as the Al Muqrin) traced its descent to the Banu Hanifa tribes but, despite popular misconceptions, Muhammad bin Saud was neither a nomadic Bedouin nor a tribal leader. Rather, he was the ruler (emir) of the town of Diriyah near modern-day Riyadh. He had lands there and was involved in financing the commercial journeys of merchants. Furthermore, he was competent and ambitious.

== Early life ==
Muhammad bin Saud was born in Diriyah in 1687. Among his siblings were Mishari, Thunayan and Farhan. The family resided in the citadel of Turaif in Diriyah.

== Reign ==
Muhammad bin Saud became local emir of Diriyah in 1727. The initial power base was the town of Diriyah where he met Muhammad bin Abdul Wahhab, who asked for protection. They formed an alliance in 1744 or 1745. Muhammad bin Saud asked Muhammad bin Abdul Wahhab to accept the two conditions: (1) Muhammad bin Abdul Wahhab should settle and stay in Diriyah and (2) he would not oppose the collection of tax by the ruler, Muhammad bin Saud. Although he accepted the first condition, he did not accept the second one arguing that he would acquire more through the battles and persuaded him not to collect tax. Muhammad bin Saud endorsed his proposal and declared their alliance. Their cooperation was further formalized by the wedding of Muhammad bin Abdul Wahhab's daughter to Abdulaziz bin Muhammad, son and successor of Muhammad bin Saud. Thereafter, the descendants of Muhammad bin Saud and the descendants of Muhammad bin Abdul Wahhab, the Al ash-Sheikh, have remained closely linked. However, the alliance was not totally supported by his family, and one of his brothers, Thunayyan bin Saud, objected to such a cooperation.

Muhammad bin Abdul Wahhab provided Muhammad bin Saud with the military backing for the House of Saud and helped establish the dynasty among other forces in the Arabian Peninsula. In addition, following their alliance Muhammad bin Saud began to collect taxes from his subjects, and the first members of the Najdi-Wahhabi elites emerged. Therefore, the significant elements of the Saudi rule which have existed until now in Saudi Arabia were shaped: the royal family, Wahhabi clerics and tribal subjects. Following their cooperation, the emirs of Diriyah began to be called Imam. Abdul Wahhab remained as an adviser to Muhammad bin Saud until the end of the latter's reign.

Muhammad bin Saud initiated attacks against the ruler of Riyadh, Dahham bin Dawwas, in 1747. However, these attacks would last for 28 years, and not Muhammad but his son and successor Abdulaziz would manage to seize Riyadh in 1773. Muhammad sent one of his slaves, Salim bin Belal Al Harik, to Oman, who was accompanied with an armed group of seventy men, to make the tribes loyal to the Saudis. The tribes, namely Bani Yas, al Shamis and al Nuaimi, initially resisted, but then, obeyed the demand and became followers of Wahhabism together with the Qawasim tribe of Sharjah and Ras Al Khaimah. When Muhammad bin Saud himself would attack anywhere, he invited the people three times to adopt the religion of Islam. If his invitation was not accepted, his forces initiated the attack and killed them.

The way he set up his government has served as the model for rulers of the House of Saud to the present day. The government was based on Islamic principles and made use of shura. He ruled the emirate until his death in 1765. By the time of his death the majority of the Najdi people and all of those living in the southern Najd were Wahhabi adherents.

== Personal life and death ==
Ibn Saud's wife was Moudi bint Abi Wahtan Al Kathir who was instrumental in his meeting with Muhammad bin Abdul Wahhab. He had five sons: Saud, Faisal, Abdulaziz, Abdullah and Ali. Of them, both Saud and Faisal died in his lifetime in a battle in 1747.

Muhammad bin Saud dressed in a plain way and, unlike those of the Mamluk and Ottoman rulers, his armaments were not decorated. He died in Diriyah in 1765 and was succeeded by his eldest son Abdulaziz.

== Legacy ==
As the head of a forerunner of the Kingdom of Saudi Arabia, the Imam Muhammad ibn Saud Islamic University is named after him.

Regnal titles
| Preceded by Zaid bin Markhan | Emir of Diriyah; 1727–1744 | Recreated Title next held by Himself as Imam of First Saudi State |
| Preceded by Office established | Imam of First Saudi State; 1744–1765 | Succeeded by Abdulaziz bin Muhammad bin Saud |
