= Samuel Hennell =

British Indian Army officer and Colonial Office administrator (1800–1880)

Colonel Samuel Hennell (c. 1800 – 13 September 1880) was a British Indian Army officer and Colonial Office administrator in the Middle East. He was the British Political Resident for the Persian Gulf from 1838 to 1852 and has been hailed as: 'without doubt the greatest Political Resident Britain has ever had in the Persian Gulf.'

== Early career ==
Samuel Hennell was tutored preparatory to entering service with the East India Company by Mr Williams of Edmonton. He was appointed assistant resident for the Persian Gulf, based in Bushire, in 1826, taking up his post six years after the British punitive expedition against the Al Qasimi at Ras Al Khaimah of 1819 and the conclusion of the subsequent General Maritime Treaty of 1820. He was made Acting Political Resident in 1835 and appointed Political Resident in the Persian Gulf in 1838.

== Maritime Truce ==
In 1835, Hennell proposed a maritime ceasefire between the Gulf Sheikhdoms based on the terms already agreed upon in the 1820 General Maritime Treaty. The new treaty would run for the pearling season, between May and November and bind all of the Rulers to avoid hostilities at sea, give full redress for any infractions committed by their subjects and avoid retaliation but instead report incidents to the Resident. Additionally, they agreed to let the Resident know if they planned any hostilities at the end of the truce. This then obliged the Resident to enforce the truce and act to obtain reparations for any injuries inflicted by one Ruler's subjects on another's.

The treaty effectively made the British the chief broker of peace in the region and was received with enthusiasm during a meeting at Basidu on the island of Qeshm, between Sultan bin Saqr Al Qasimi, Ruler of Ras Al Khaimah and Sharjah and Shakhbut bin Dhiyab Al Nahyan, Ruler of Abu Dhabi. The two Rulers approved of the idea and Hennell invited Obeid bin Said bin Rashid of Dubai and Rashid bin Humaid Al Nuaimi of Ajman to join them. The Truce as proposed by Hennell was signed by all four Rulers in Bushire on the 21 August 1835. Umm Al Quwain at the time was subject to Ras Al Khaimah and so did not sign independently. Although it was signed in August 1835, the Treaty bound its signatories from May 1835 to November 1835.

Hennell subsequently reported how news “came in from all quarters of the joy and satisfaction diffused amongst the inhabitants of the whole line of the Arabian Coast of the Gulf on the intelligence reaching them of the establishment of the Truce.”

=== Trucial States ===
Pronounced a great success, the Truce was to be renewed in subsequent years, becoming a year-round agreement from 1838 onwards. The series of truces led to the Sheikhdoms of the Lower Gulf becoming referred to as the 'Trucial States'. On 1 June 1843, a ten-year treaty was signed by the rulers.

Hennell, buoyed by his success as a peacemaker between the Sheikdoms of the Lower Gulf, also concluded a treaty with Kuwait when, in 1841, Abdullah II of Kuwait signed a one-year naval truce with Hennell, which however expired and was not renewed. The truce prohibited Kuwait from undertaking any form of maritime offense as well as giving all mediation efforts in maritime disputes over to the British Empire.

Another innovation introduced in by Hennell was the ‘restrictive line’, defined in 1846, which outlined an area of the Gulf where the Trucial Rulers agreed not to undertake acts of war regardless if there was a maritime truce in place, in any area from the Persian coast to the islands of Sirri and Abu Musa. This was later extended to the Sharjah owned island of Sir Bu Nair.

In 1853, the Perpetual Maritime Truce of 4 May 1853 prohibited any act of aggression at sea and was signed by Abdulla bin Rashid Al Mualla of Umm Al Quwain; Humaid bin Rashid Al Nuaimi of Ajman; Saeed bin Butti of Dubai; Saeed bin Tahnun Al Nahyan ('Chief of the Beniyas') and Sultan bin Saqr Al Qasimi ('Chief of the Joasmees'). This treaty was signed by Hennell's former deputy and now successor, Arnold Burrowes Kemball.

== Marriage ==
On 28 November 1837, Hennell (then carrying the rank of captain) married Anne Inman Orton, the eldest daughter of James Orton, the surgeon and head of the Medical Board for the British East India Company in Bombay, at Bycullah.

They had two sons, James Bruce Hennell, born in 1843 at Bushire and William Frederick Hennell, born in Bushire on 27 October 1850. Soon after, in 1852, the Hennells returned to England, where Hennell, retiring as a colonel in the Grenadier Regiment of the Bombay Native Infantry, took up residence in Charlton Rings, Gloucestershire. Both of Anne and Samuel Hennell's sons travelled to serve in the Indian army and, in 1879, both were killed during the Afghan War. Hennell died, at the age of 80, the following year.
