= Al Wakrah =

Al Wakrah الوكرة
- City
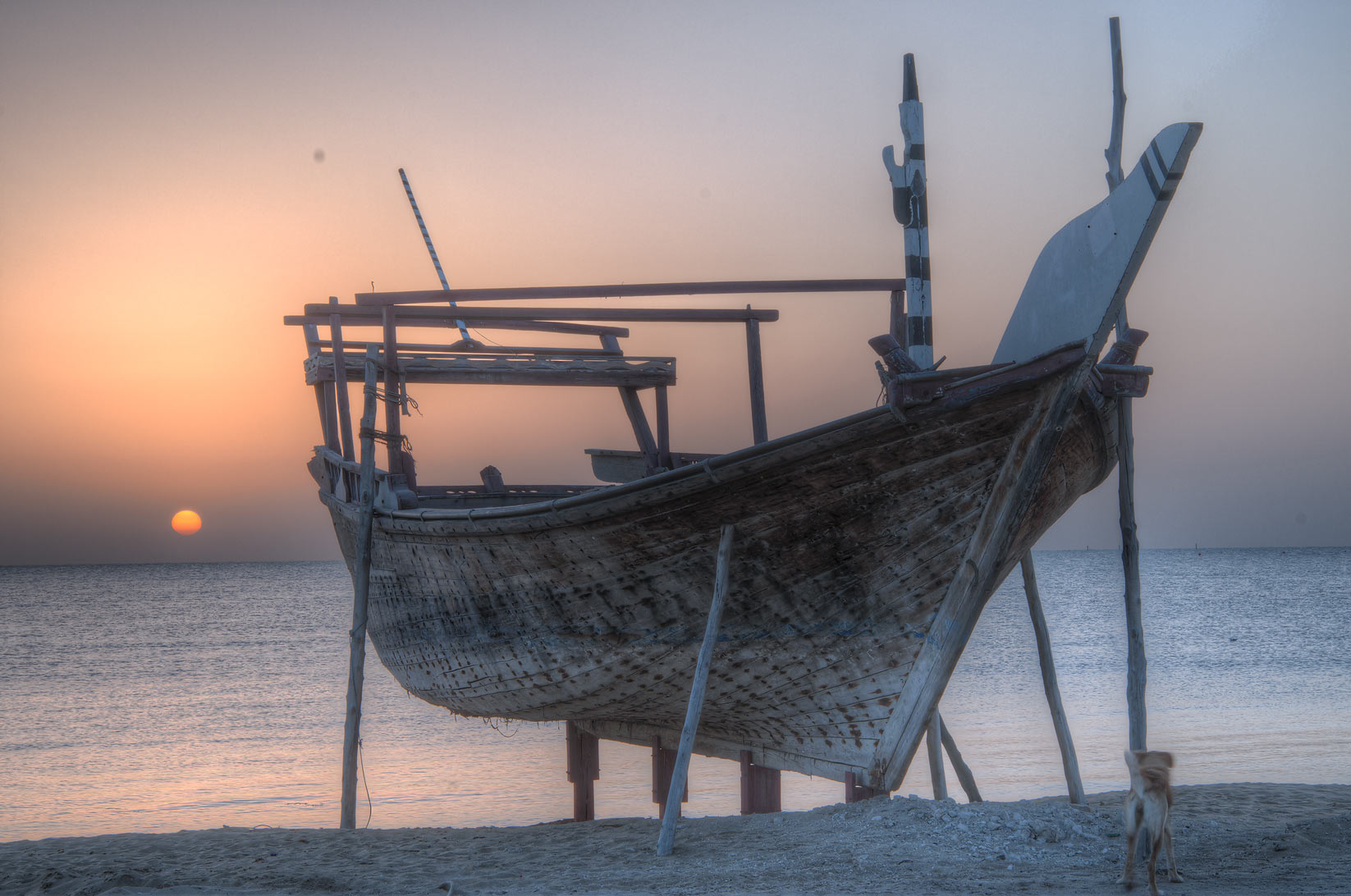
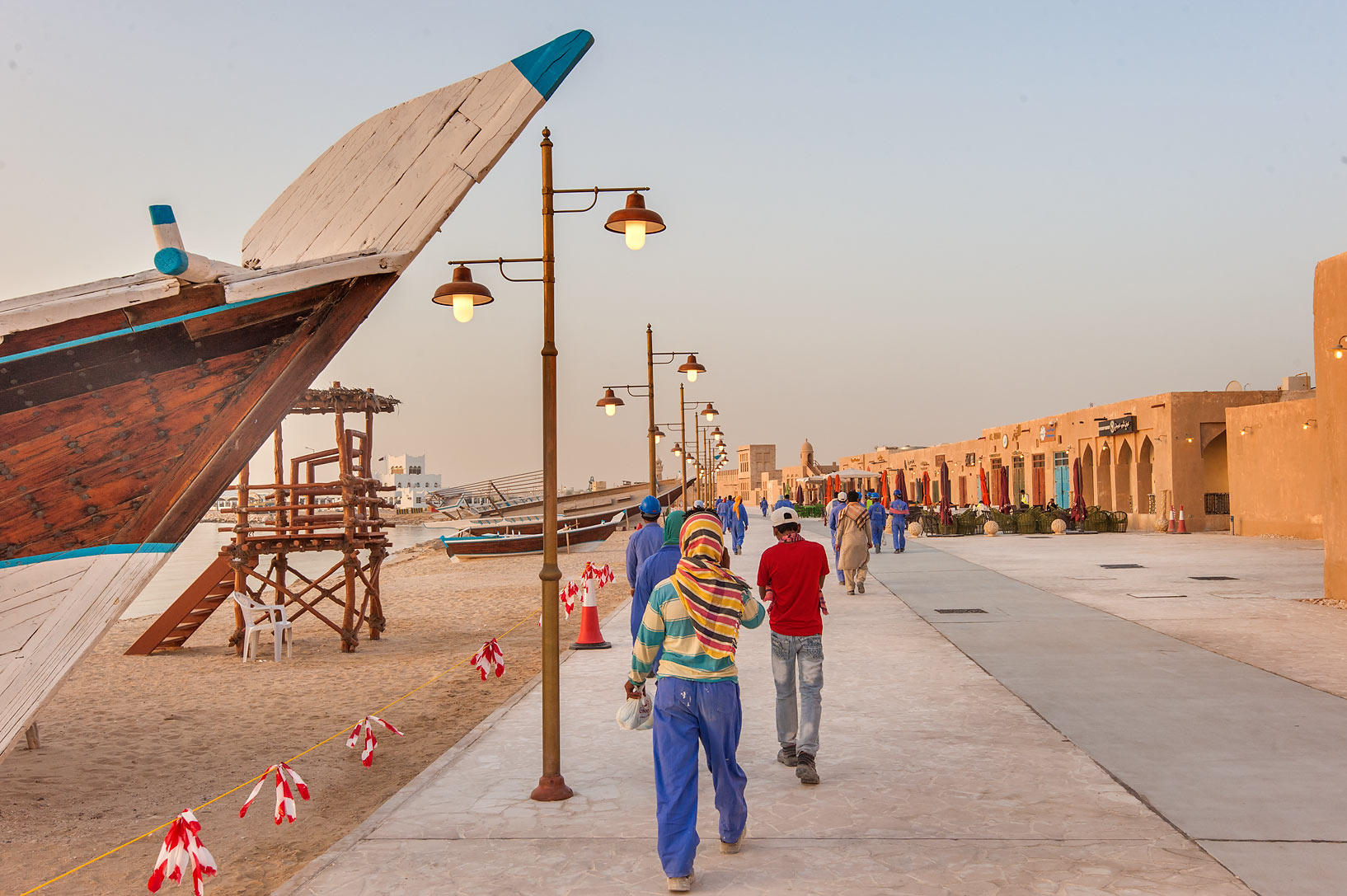
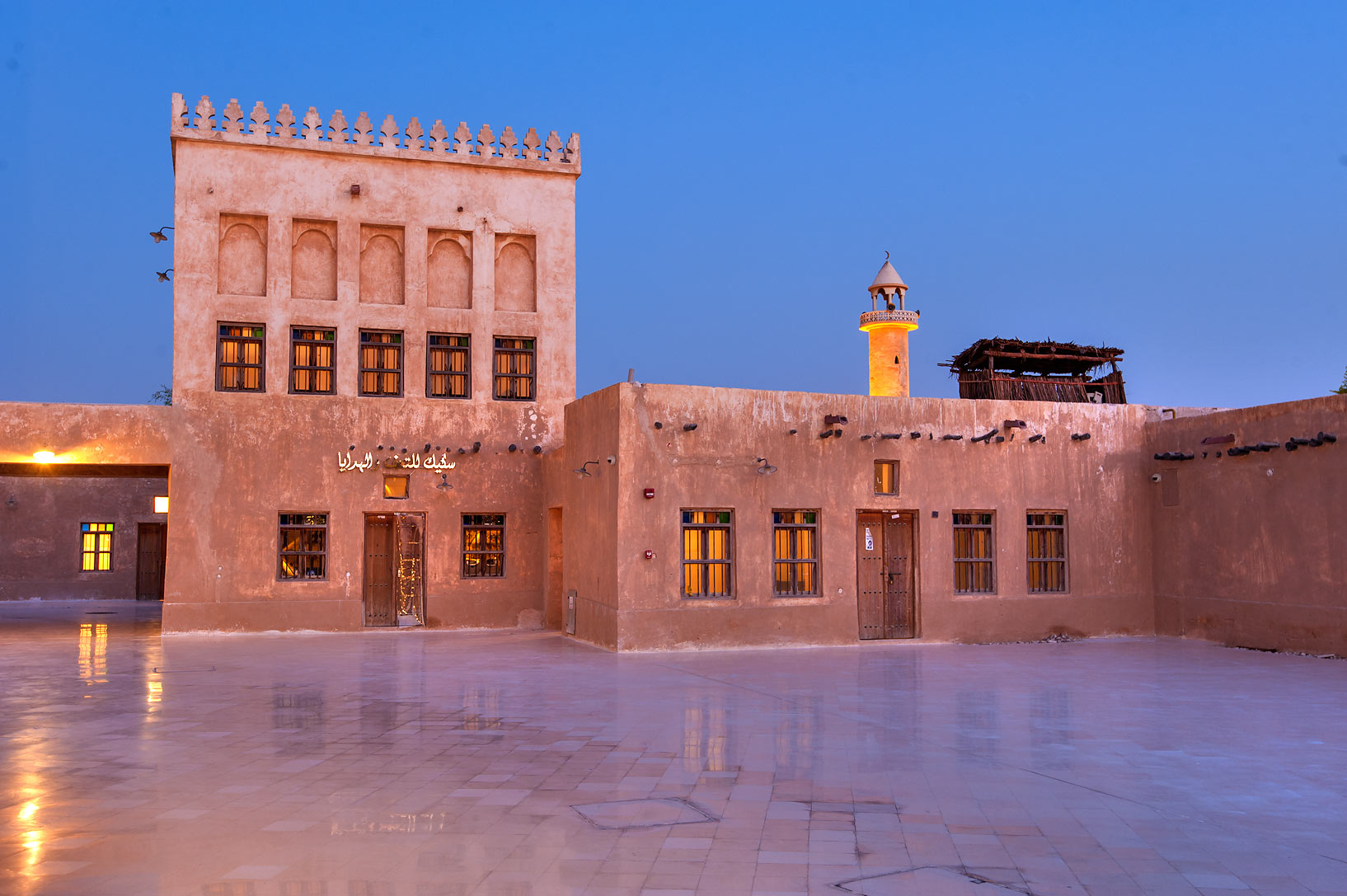
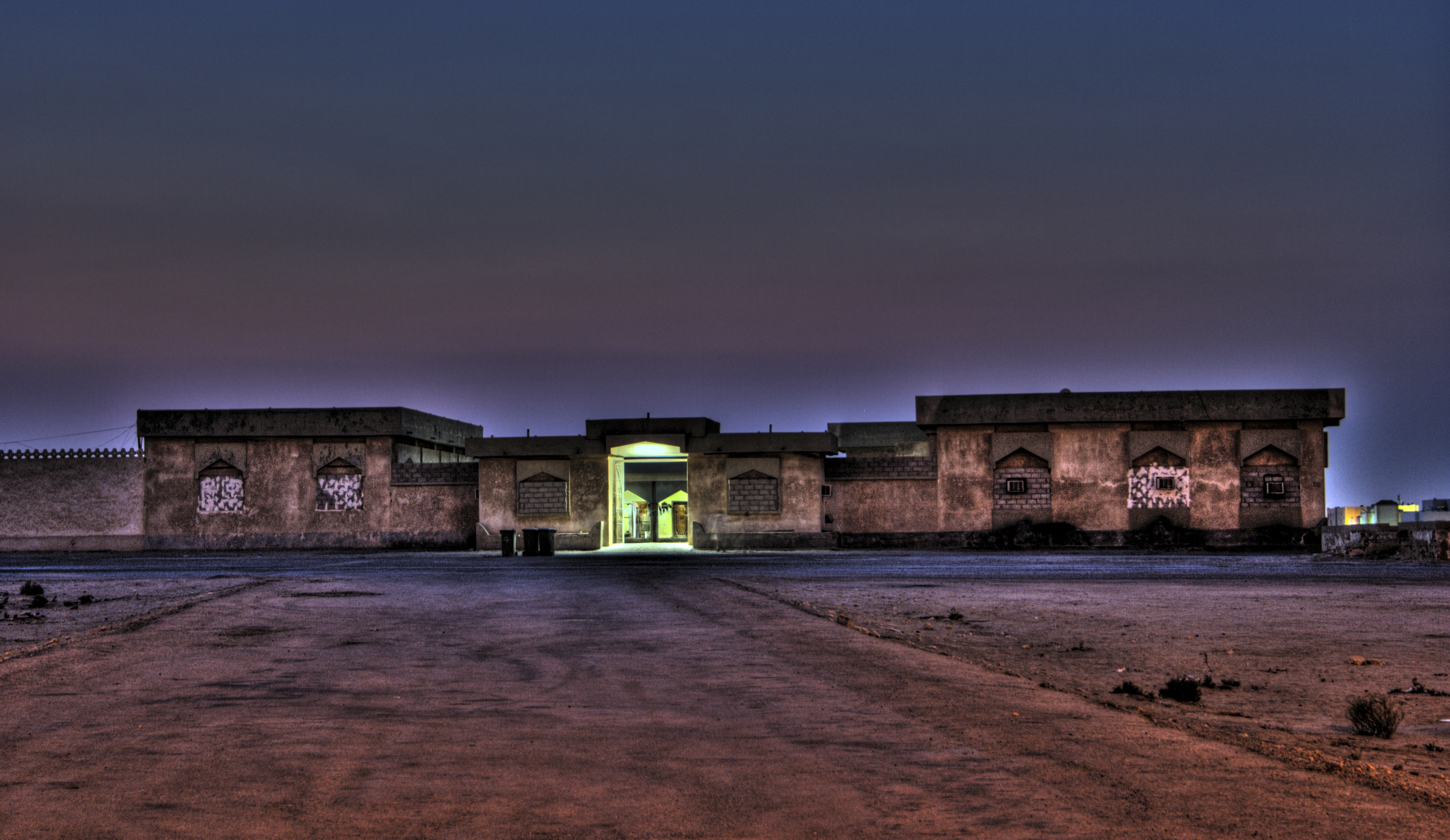
- Top to Bottom, Left to Right: A lone fishing vessel on the coastline, Workers traveling along Al Wakrah Corniche in the Al Wakrah Heritage Village, Traditional stone buildings in Al Wakrah Heritage Village, Renovated fort of Sheikh Abdulrahman bin Jassim Al Thani (now known as Al Wakrah Fort)

- Seal

- Location in Qatar Al Wakrah (Middle East) Al Wakrah (Asia)
- Coordinates (Al Wakrah): 25°10′48″N 51°36′36″E
- Country: Qatar
- Municipality: Al Wakrah Municipality

Area
  - Total: 75.8 km^{2} (29.3 sq mi)

Population (2015)
  - Total: 87,970
  - Density: 1,160/km^{2} (3,010/sq mi)
- Time zone: UTC+03
- ISO 3166 code: QA-WA

Al Wakrah (Arabic: الوكرة, romanized: al-Wakra) is the capital city of the Al Wakrah Municipality in Qatar. Al Wakrah's eastern edge touches the shores of the Persian Gulf and Qatar's capital Doha is situated immediately north of the city. Governed by Sheikh Abdulrahman bin Jassim Al Thani, it was originally a small fishing and pearling village. Over the years, it evolved into a small city with a population of more than 80,000 and is currently one of Qatar's most populous cities.

The city was historically used as a pearling center during the period in which Qatar's economy was almost entirely dependent on the bustling pearling industry. According to the United States Hydrographic Office, by 1920, there were approximately 300 ships situated in the town. A following study carried out by the British in 1925 stated that there were 250 boats in Wakrah's port. Al Wakrah was thought to encompass the so-called 'Pirate Coast', as stated by a report written in 1898. Once the country began large-scale oil operations in the mid-20th century, Al Wakrah became more important due to its proximity to the Mesaieed Industrial Area, Qatar's main industrial manufacturing hub and oil terminal.

It has undergone extensive development and growth since the turn of the 21st century while also being steadily encroached on by rapidly expanding Doha from the north. Notable milestones in the city's modern history include the 2019 inauguration of Al Janoub Stadium, a venue for the Qatar 2022 World Cup, the opening of Souq Al Wakrah in 2014, the Al Wakrah Main Road Project, and the city's integration into the Doha Metro's Red Line in 2019.

== Etymology ==
The city's name derives from the Arabic word wakar (lit. 'bird's nest'). According to the Ministry of Municipality and Environment, this name was given in reference to a nearby hill (likely Jebel Al Wakrah) which accommodated the nests of several birds.

== History ==
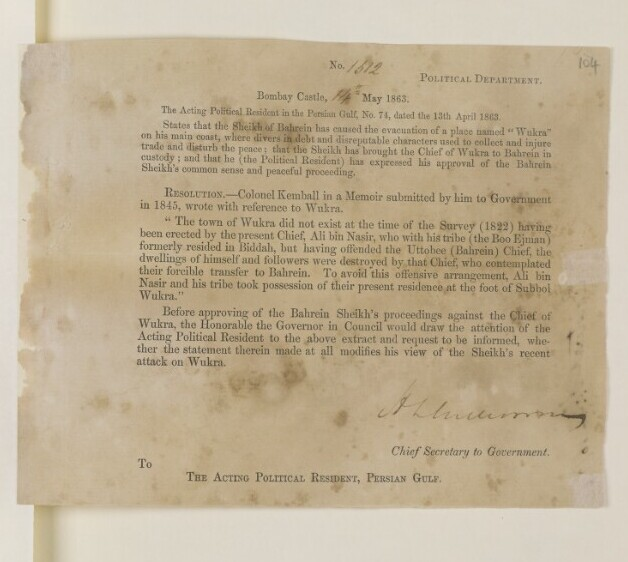
A document detailing Al Wakrah's formation and Kemball's account written by Lewis Pelly, Political Resident in the Persian Gulf, in 1863

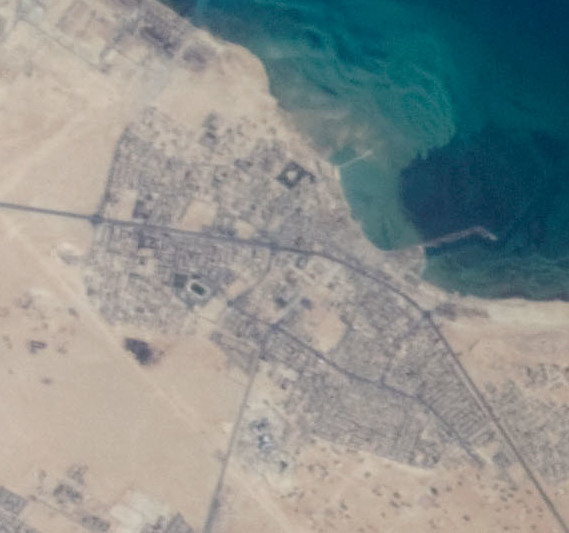
Satellite imagery of Al Wakrah taken in 2009.

=== Formation ===
Arnold Burrowes Kemball, a British Political Resident, wrote with reference to Al Wakrah in 1845, providing significant historical context for the town's establishment. According to Kemball's account, Al Wakrah did not exist at the time of Persian Gulf resident John MacLeod's 1822 survey of Qatar's east coast. He states that the town was founded by Ali bin Nasir, chief of the Ajman tribe, who had previously resided in Al Bidda (modern Doha). Following a dispute with the Bahraini ruler, Ali bin Nasir and his followers faced the destruction of their dwellings in Al Bidda and the threat of forcible relocation to Bahrain. To evade this punitive measure, they established their new settlement at the foot of Jebel Al Wakrah. Architectural evidence suggests that Al Wakrah may have served as the first urban centre of Qatar.

=== Al Khalifa rule ===
In 1851, the Battle of Mesaimeer took place in Mesaimeer, to the west of Al Wakrah. The conflict primarily involved Qatari forces led by Mohammed bin Thani and Jassim bin Mohammed Al Thani, then under Bahraini suzerainty, against the invading army of Faisal bin Turki, Imam of Emirate of Nejd, who was seeking to stage his third invasion attempt of Bahrain from the peninsula. Bahraini and Abu Dhabi forces, nominally allied with Qatar, remained largely uninvolved in the fighting. The battle lasted from 2 June to 4 June of that year, with the Qatari leader Mohammed bin Thani agreeing to a separate peace agreement with Faisal bin Turki, angering his former Bahraini allies.

On 25 July, 1851, a peace agreement was reached between the Bahrainis and Wahhabis. The resulting accord stipulated that Ali bin Khalifa would pay 4,000 German krones annually as zakat to Faisal, while the latter agreed to restore Al Bidda Fort to Ali bin Khalifa and to abstain from interference in Qatari affairs or on behalf of Abdullah bin Ahmed's sons. However, the chief of Al Wakrah, Rashid bin Faddal, objected to this agreement, preferring to stay under Wahhabi rule. As a result, he left Qatar, migrating to the coast of Fars.

In 1863, the Bahraini ruler Muhammad bin Khalifa sent his cousin Mohammed bin Ahmed to act as deputy emir of Qatar. The Qataris soon compelled him to return to Bahrain after he arrested and deported the ruler of Al Wakrah, as well as many other notables from the town to Bahrain. The incident was reported by the Acting Political Resident in a dispatch dated 13 April 1863. According to the dispatch, the reason given for the evacuation was to eliminate a haven for debtors and disreputable characters who were perceived as detrimental to trade and peace in the region.

In 1866, an event known as the Al Wakrah Incident occurred. Bahrain arrested a Qatari Bedouin of the Na'im tribe in Al Wakrah market and deported him to Bahrain. The caravan, preparing for the customary pearl diving expedition, was attacked and its goods confiscated. When resistance was offered, the Na'im leader, Ali bin Thamer, was apprehended and sent to Bahrain. Upon his arrival, he was incarcerated.

In 1867, the Na'im tribal elders appealed to Jassim bin Mohammed Al Thani for assistance, recognizing his growing influence and reputation for justice. Jassim mobilized a general levy of Qatari forces and marched on Al Wakrah, seeking to apprehend the Bahraini representative Ahmed bin Mohammed Al Khalifa, who took shelter in Al Wakrah Fort. The besieging forces intensified their efforts to the point where they nearly captured the fortress. Lacking sufficient defensive capabilities, Ahmed was compelled to flee to Al Khuwayr, a location in the northern part of mainland Qatar, from where he dispatched a message to the ruler of Bahrain reporting the events.

==== Qatari–Bahraini War ====
In an act of deception, the Al Khalifa then lured Jassim to Bahrain in 1867, by writing a letter admonishing the Bahraini representative assuring him that no ill will was harbored towards Jassim. He also released the Na'im chief, Ali bin Thamer. However, upon his arrival, he was imprisoned. Following this, Muhammad bin Khalifa assembled a naval fleet to raid Qatar, sparking the Qatari–Bahraini War.

Bahrain succeeded in gaining support from Abu Dhabi, as Doha and Al Wakrah have long been harbors of refuge for Omani seceders, and launched a naval assault. As a result, Al Wakrah, along with neighboring Doha, was sacked by the combined Bahraini and Abu Dhabi forces that year in an incident commonly known as the Second Destruction of Doha. A British record later stated "the towns of Doha and Wakrah were, at the end of 1867 temporarily blotted out of existence, the houses being dismantled and the inhabitants deported".

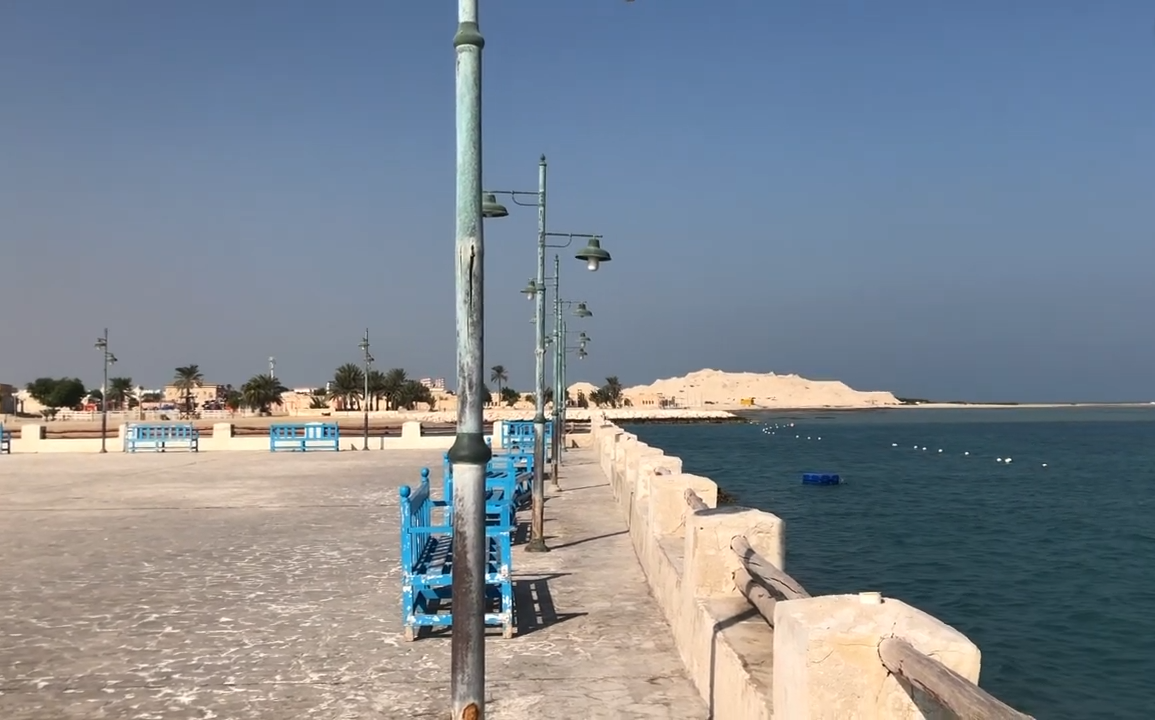
Far view of Jebel Al Wakrah, site of the final confrontation between Bahraini and Qatari forces

In June 1868, the Qataris attempted to launch a counterattack against the Bahrainis, but, were defeated in the Battle of Damsah. The aftermath of the Battle of Damsah saw the Qatari forces execute a strategic withdrawal, prompting a pursuit by Bahraini troops to Al Wakrah. At this location, the Qatari contingent mounted a defense in the Battle of Jebel Wakrah, successfully encircling the Bahraini forces and capturing two of their commanders. The engagement concluded with a negotiated exchange of prisoners, following which Jassim bin Mohammed returned to his seat of power in Doha.

As a result of the war, in 1868, Lieutenant Colonel Lewis Pelly, the British Resident in Bahrain, issued a warrant for a Mohammed bin Khalifa's arrest and effectively deposed him as hakim of Bahrain. Pelly traveled to Al Wakrah, where he met with Mohammed bin Thani and signed a landmark agreement in which the British recognized the Al Thani as the rulers of Qatar.

=== Ottoman rule (1871–1916) ===
==== 19th century ====
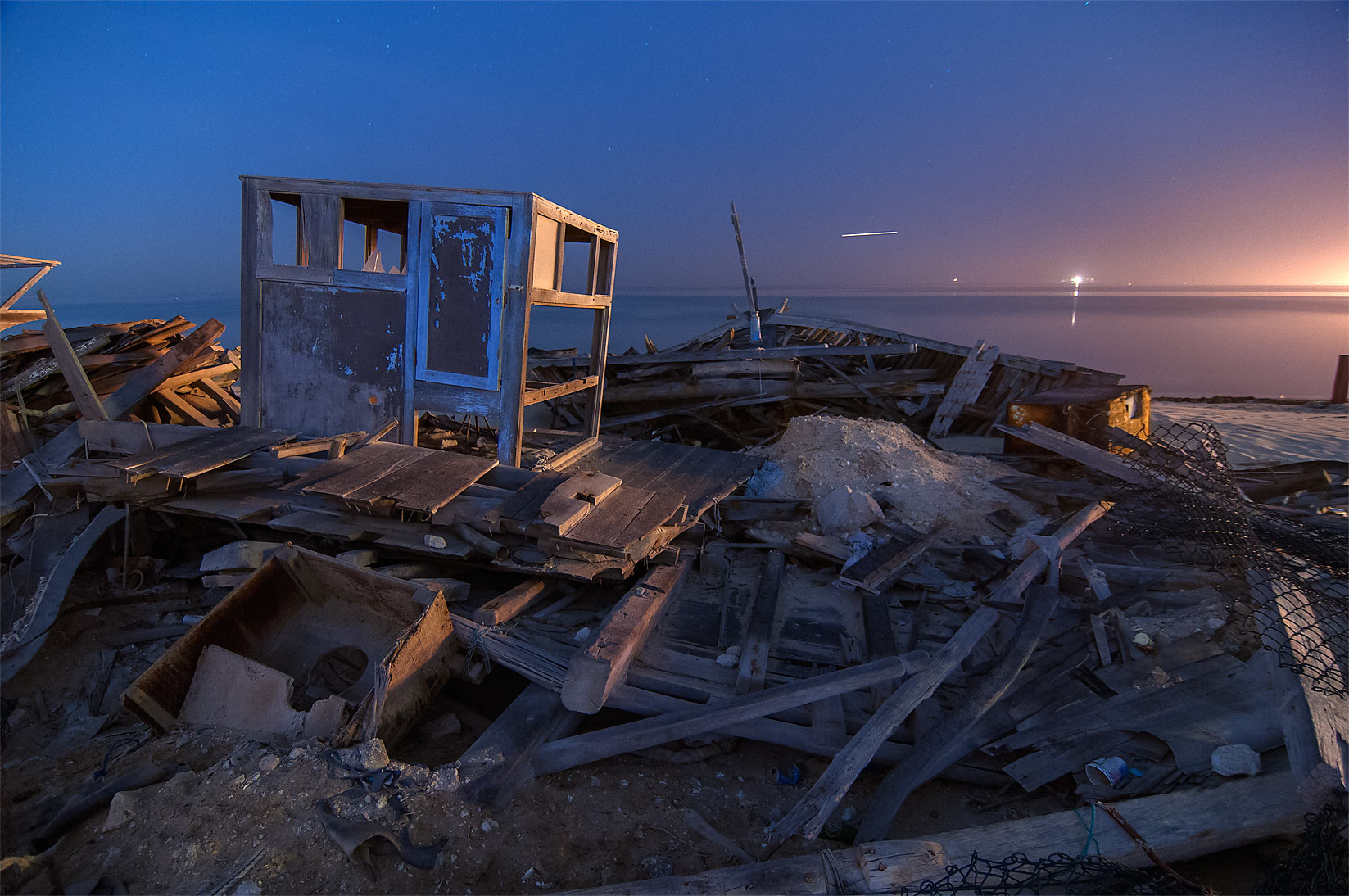
Old dhow in Al Wakrah at morning.

Almost immediately after Qatar succumbed to Ottoman control, Major Ömer Bey compiled a report on the major towns in the peninsula. The article, published in January 1872, reflected on the depopulation of Al Wakrah resulting from the war by estimating a meager population of 400 while approximating the town's fleet at 50 ships. Abu Al-Qassim Munshi, a British resident in Qatar, wrote a memo regarding the districts of Qatar in 1872. In it, he mentions that "in the year 1218 [1803 in the Gregorian calendar], Al Wakrah was ruled by the Al-Boo-Aynain tribe", although J. G. Lorimer claims that the Al Buainain tribe migrated to Al Wakrah from Ar Ru'ays and Fuwayrit sometime after 1828.

In 1885, a group of 100 Al Wakra natives from the Al-Buainain and Al-Jehran tribes left the town and settled at Al Ghariyah due to a dispute with Sheikh Jassim bin Mohammed Al Thani. A coalition, led by Mohammed bin Abdul Wahab, was formed to resist Sheikh Jassim. A meeting was summoned between Sheikh Jassim and Mohammed bin Abdul Wahab and the discussion was mediated by an Ottoman commander of an Al Bidda-situated gunboat. The Ottoman commander's proposal that the coalition be left alone infuriated Sheikh Jassim. This incited tribesmen loyal to Sheikh Jassim to attack Al Ghariyah, but they were defeated, with the Bani Hajer tribe suffering a few casualties.

In August 1887, during the Qatari–Abu Dhabi War, Sheikh Zayed bin Khalifa Al Nahyan of Abu Dhabi lodged a formal complaint with British authorities regarding a maritime incident involving Qatari vessels. According to Zayed's account, a baghlah originating from Al Wakrah allegedly engaged in acts of piracy. The vessel was reported to have first plundered a Bahraini boat in the vicinity of Ashat Island. Subsequently, the same vessel approached a baghlah crewed by members of the Qubaisi tribe, who were engaged in pearl diving activities. The report states that the Qubaisi divers, unaware of the impending threat, were caught off guard. The aggressors opened fire on the Qubaisi vessel, resulting in the death of a crew member identified as Ashkan. Zayed attributed this act of aggression to the instigation of Jassim bin Mohammed, the de facto ruler of Qatar, and Ali bin Rashid of Al Wakrah.

A British survey conducted on the area in 1890 asserted that the town, still suffering from the effects of the 1867 war, had since been rebuilt. The surveyors wrote that the Al Wakrah had 12 forts, at least 1,000 inhabitants, and several boats. Jebel Al Wakrah, an 26 m (85 ft) high rocky hill, was noted 1 mi (1.6 km) south of the town.

==== 20th century ====
A conflict occurred off the coast of Al Wakrah in 1900 between individuals of the Al Bin Ali tribe and Amamara tribe after a fleet of Amamara vessels were blown into the Al Bin Ali's ships by strong winds. A relative of Jassim bin Mohammed Al Thani defused the situation after the initial exchange of gunfire and no casualties were recorded. Nonetheless, the British Political Resident arrived in Al Wakrah that year and issued a 1,000 rupee fine to the Al Bin Ali tribe after his investigation found them guilty.

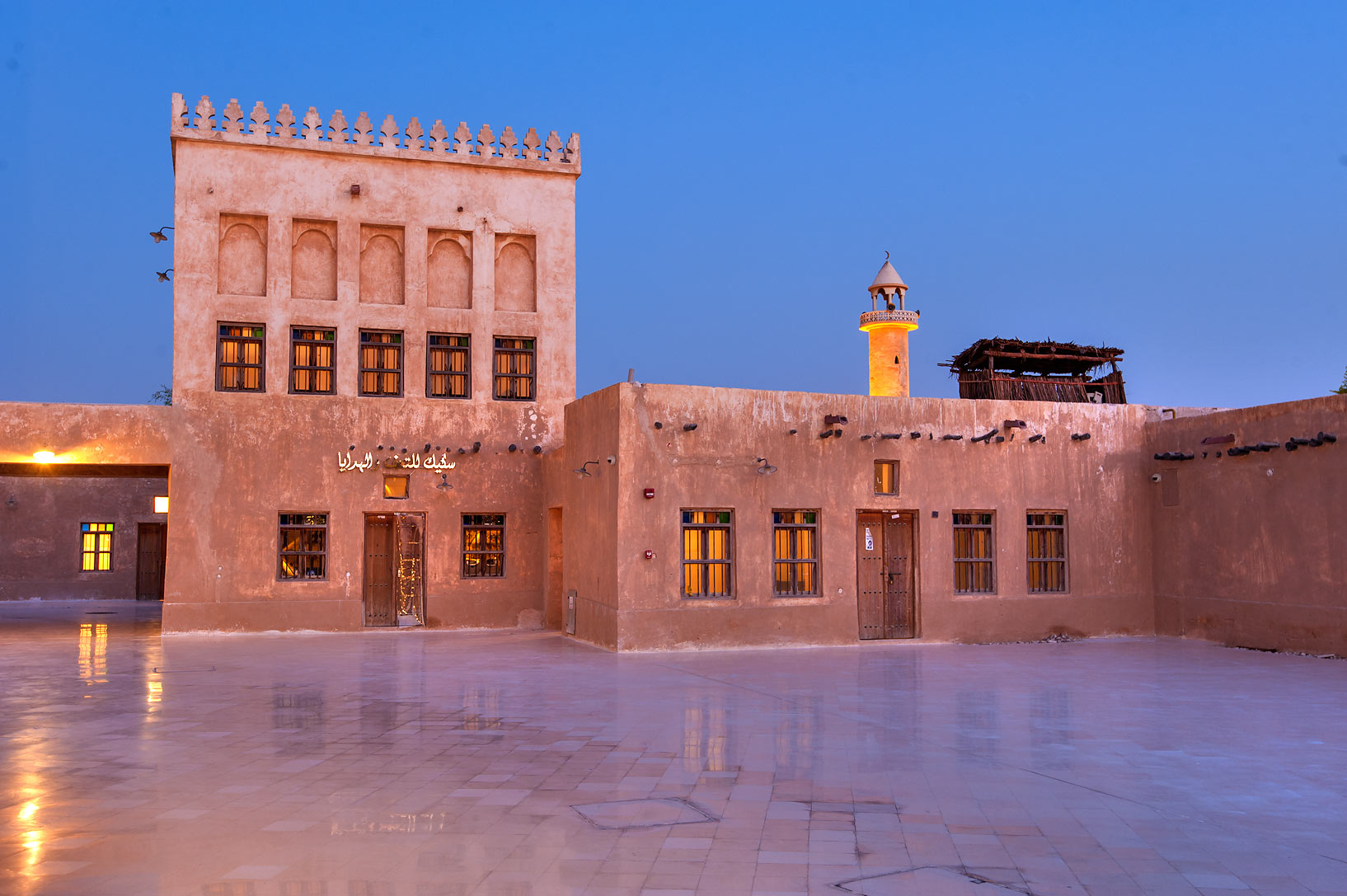
Souq Al Wakrah

At the end of 1902, the Ottomans installed Ottoman administrative officials in Al Wakrah and Zubarah in an attempt to assert their authority. This was in addition to the already existing Ottoman administrative officials in Doha. An Ottoman, Yusuf Bey, was appointed as Mudir of Al Wakrah in the spring of 1903. Due to British discontent, Yusuf Bey's appointment was short-lived, and he was later called to act as the assistant Kaymakam of Qatar and did not return to Al Wakrah. Sheikh Abdulrahman bin Jassim Al Thani was appointed as Mudir by the Ottomans in place of Yusuf Bey the same year. This elicited fresh protests by the British government, who refused the Ottoman's rights to appoint any administrative official in Qatar. In November 1904, the Ottomans abolished the post altogether upon further urging by the British.

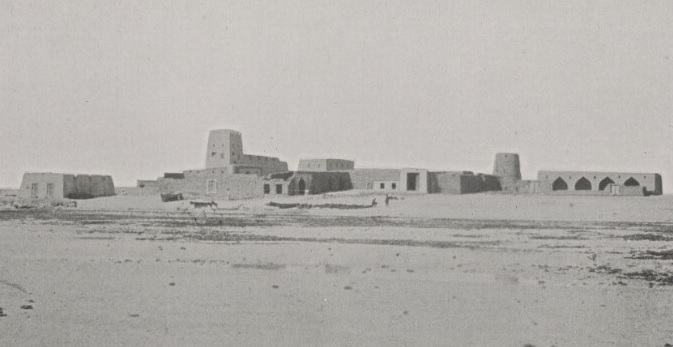
Al Wakrah Fort in 1908.

From December 1907, there was a series of disputes between the governor, Sheikh Abdulrahman, and the Al-Buainain tribe. The Al-Buainain tribe had objected to paying the annual boat tax, and in reprisal, the sheikh fined the tribe 10,000 Qatari riyals and expelled 6 of the tribe's leaders. As retribution, one of the tribe leader's sons attempted to shoot Sheikh Abdulrahman. His attempt was foiled, and he was imprisoned; however, he was later forgiven and released in return for the payment of the tax. The Al Buainains later sent an envoy, Ahmed bin Khater, to the Ottomans in Basra to request that a military garrison be erected in Al Wakrah to help accost the sheikh of Qatar, Jassim bin Mohammed Al Thani. The envoy returned with two letters from the Ottomans addressed to Jassim bin Mohammed. A fortnight later, the Al-Buainain tribe appealed to a Mutasarrıf of Al-Hasa, Mahir Pasha. This reinvigorated tensions between the British and the Ottomans due to the British perception that this provided the Ottomans an opportunity to exert more authority over the Qatar Peninsula.

British diplomat J. G. Lorimer describes Al Wakrah in his Gazetteer of the Persian Gulf, Oman and Central Arabia, first published in 1908. His account states that the town accommodated 250 houses and had a population of roughly 1,000. It was said to be located 10 mi (16 km) away from one of Qatar's primary pearling villages, Al Bidda. The records also stated that the town's original inhabitants were migrants from Al Bidda. Al Wakrah was described as "independent of Bidda and other towns; and as thriving and more cheerful in appearance than Bidda, to which it was equal in size".

=== British protectorate (1916–1971) ===
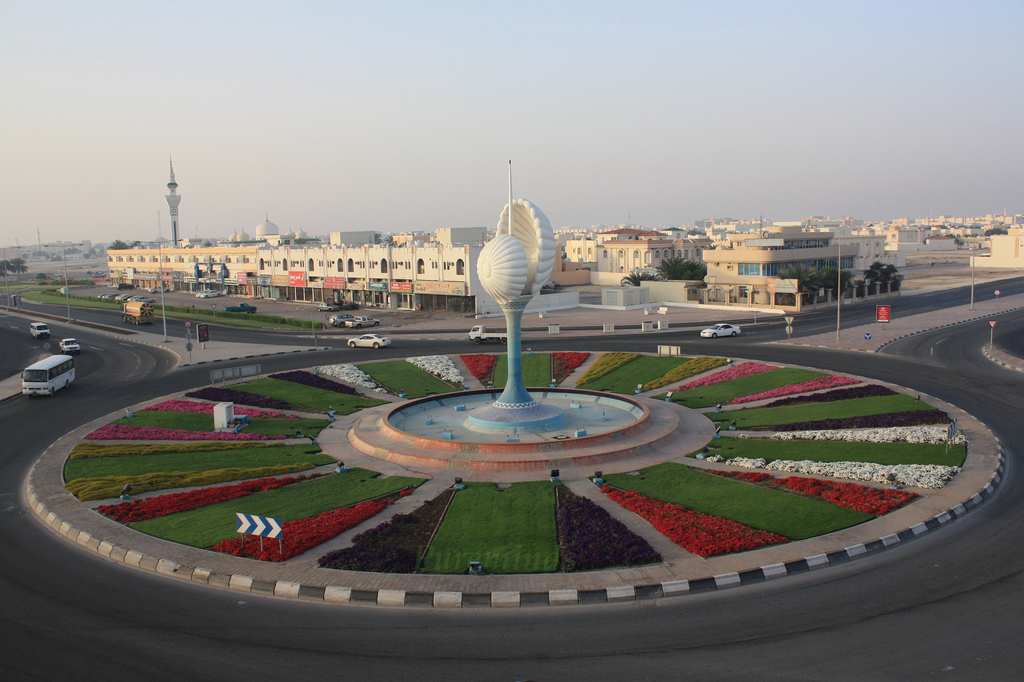
Shell Roundabout in Al Wakrah in 2010.

A British survey carried out in 1925 recounts Al Wakrah in exhaustive detail. Concerning the infrastructure and borders, it asserts that most houses in Al Wakrah were made of mud and stone, as no other building materials were available. The town originally formed a compact block, but in the preceding years a detached quarter known as Rumailah sprung up about 800 yards (730 m) northward. There were 8,000 inhabitants at the time of the census, with 2,000 individuals belonging to the Al-Buainain tribe, 1,500 Huwala people, 850 members of the Al-Khulaifat tribe, 1,000 black Africans, and 2,000 black African slaves. Other ethnic groups and tribes comprised the remaining 650 inhabitants. The Al-Khulaifat and Al-Maadeed tribes were described as being the sole inhabitants of the Rumailah quarter. The report also described the inhabitants of Al Wakrah as primarily being pearl divers, sailors, and fishermen. It further reported Al Wakrah as being a market place with 75 shops.

=== Post declaration of independence ===
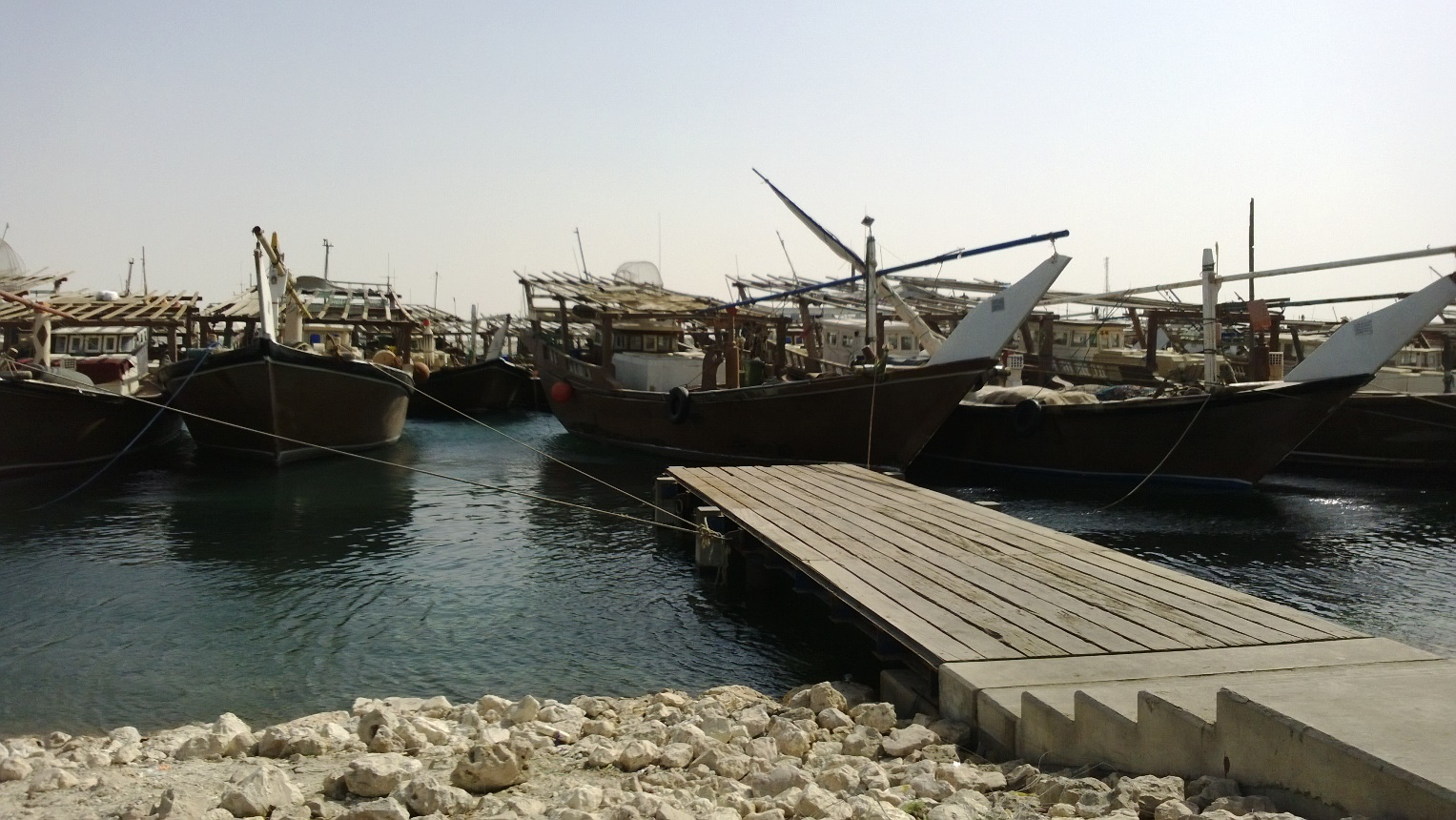
Harbor in Al Wakrah.

After Qatar became independent in 1971, Sheikh Khalifa bin Hamad Al Thani assumed control of the state in February 1972. One of his main policies was the decentralization of Qatar's housing and major infrastructure projects. To promote growth outside of Doha, in 1972 he ordered the construction of a jetty and approach channel in Al Wakrah.

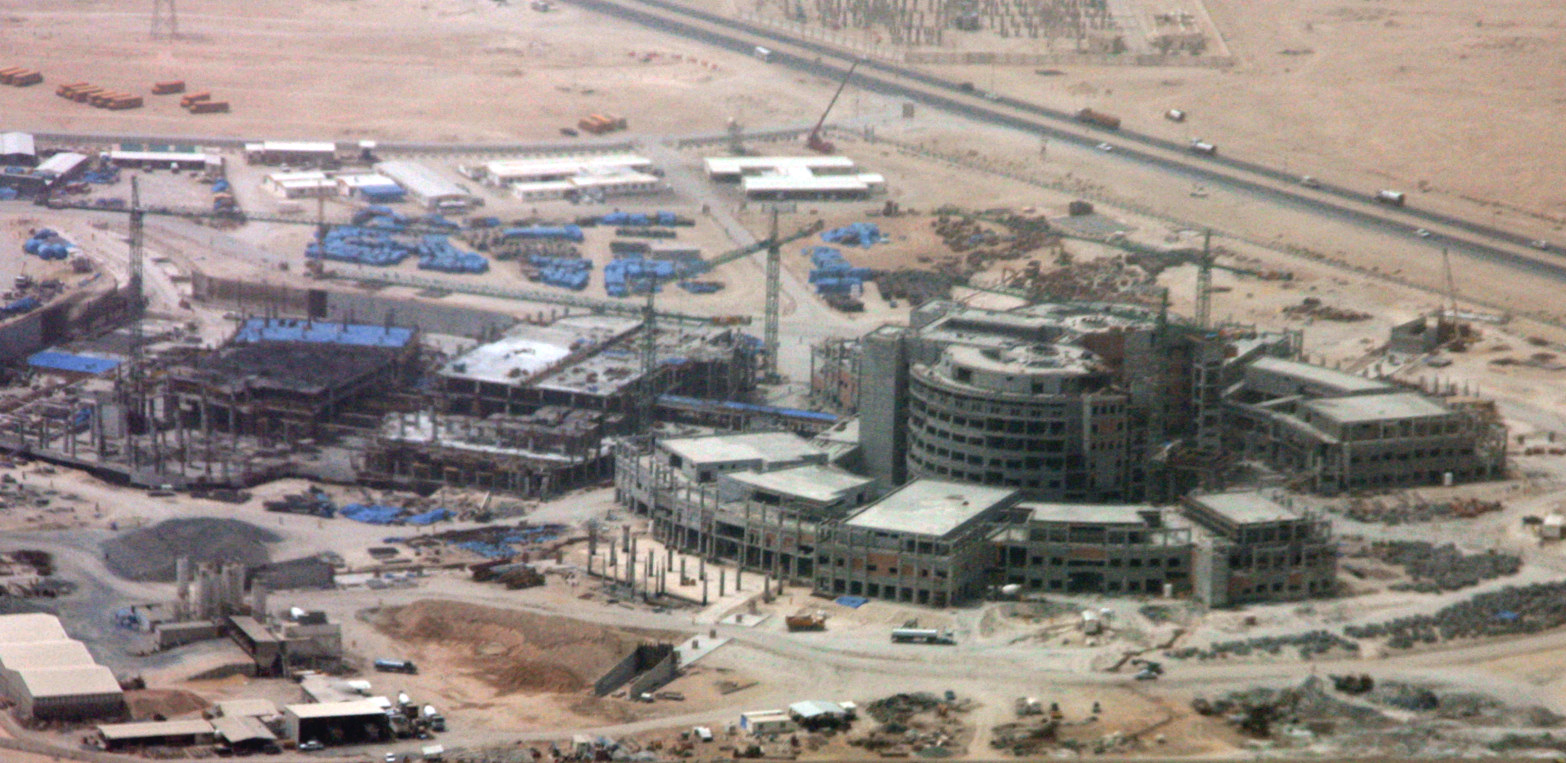
Al Wakra Hospital under construction

The city's first park, Al Wakrah Public Park, was completed during the mid-1980s. Furthermore, during the 1980s, the Municipal Council of Al Wakrah Municipality initiated major beach clean-ups, the construction of new roundabouts, and the naming of unmarked streets. In March 1986, the Ministry of Public Works signed a deal to build a secondary school for boys in Al Wakrah at a cost of QR 12.9 million.

An urban development plan was enacted in Al Wakrah in 2008. The most prominent features of this plan were the development of Al Wakra Beach, the development of the city center, and the expansion of the southern portion of the city. The plan's main purpose was to improve the infrastructure in order to accommodate more than 600,000 residents.

Al Janoub Stadium, a retractable-roof football stadium and was inaugurated on 16 May 2019. This was the second of the eight stadiums built for the 2022 FIFA World Cup in Qatar, after the renovation of Khalifa International Stadium. It was designed by Iraqi-British architect Zaha Hadid (1950–2016) together with the firm AECOM.

At a press conference held at the Ministry of Education in September 2017, it was announced that Al Wakrah joined the UNESCO Global Network of Learning Cities , becoming the first Qatari city to do so. Al Wakra received the UNESCO Learning City Award in 2021 for its provision of educational opportunities to its residents. The city was also recognized for the formation of a Worker's Support and Insurance Fund, sustainability and recycling programs, and a workers' education program in which free personal computers were allocated.

== Geography ==
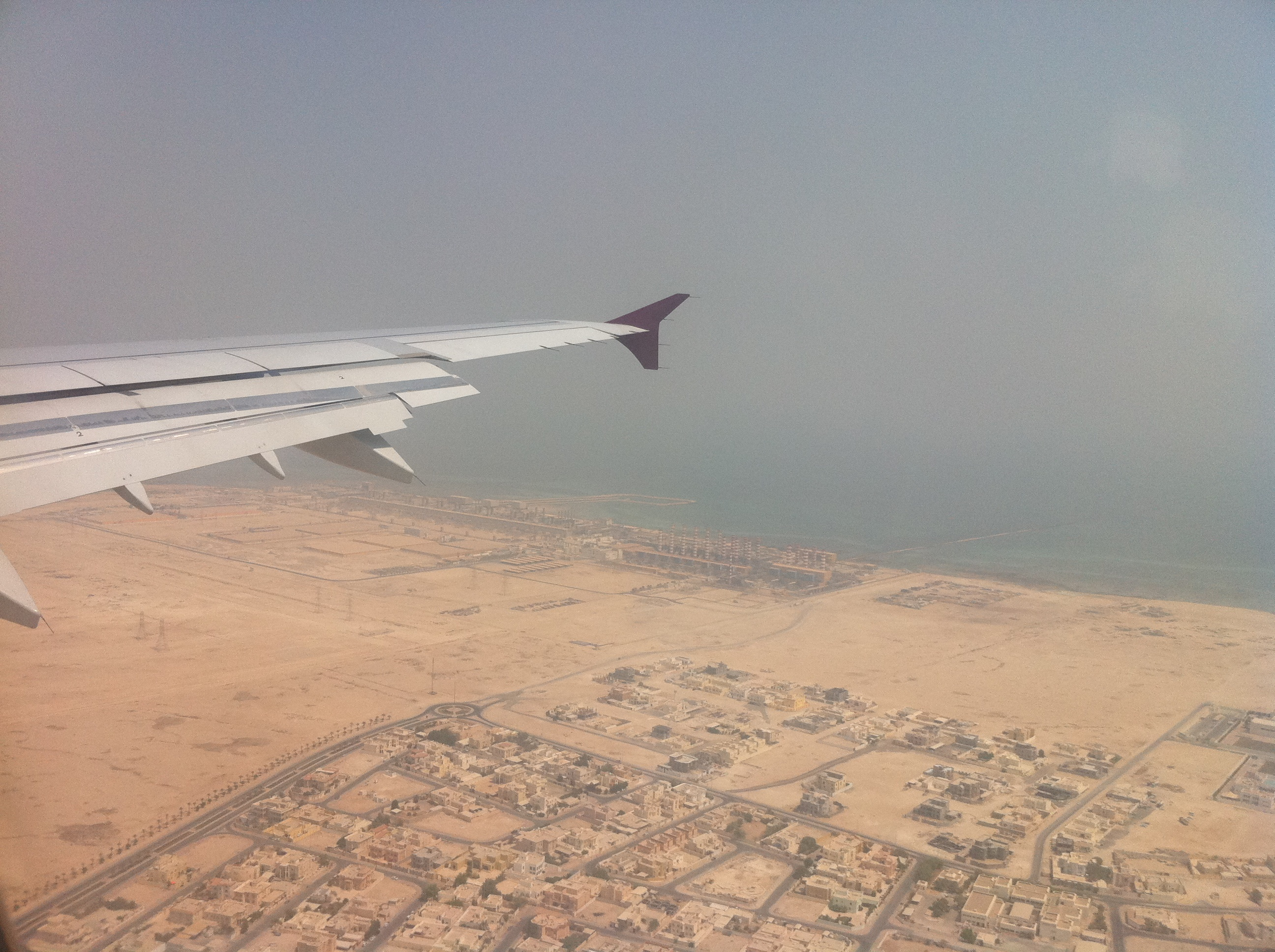
Aerial shot of Ras Abu Fontas and northeast Al Wakrah in 2010.

Al Wakrah is a coastal city with the Persian Gulf to its immediate east and is approximately 15 km (9.3 mi) south of the capital Doha.

In a 2010 survey of Al Wakrah's coastal waters conducted by the Qatar Statistics Authority, it was found that its average depth was a shallow 2.25 meters (7 ft 5 in) and its average pH was 7.95. The waters had a salinity of 49.14 psu, an average temperature of 22.78 °C (73.00 °F) and 6.6 mg/L of dissolved oxygen.

Al Wakrah's coastline features distinctive geological formations dating back to the Quaternary period. Prominent among these are ridges composed of cemented calcareous sandstone, colloquially termed calcarenite, and limestone exhibiting a pseudo-oolitic structure. These formations, presenting as modest escarpments or low-lying ridges, are parallel to the shoreline. Similar lithological structures are observable at various points along Qatar's coast, including the vicinities of Fuwayrit and Al Ghariyah. Geological evidence suggests these features were sculpted during a previous interglacial epoch, when ocean levels were higher.

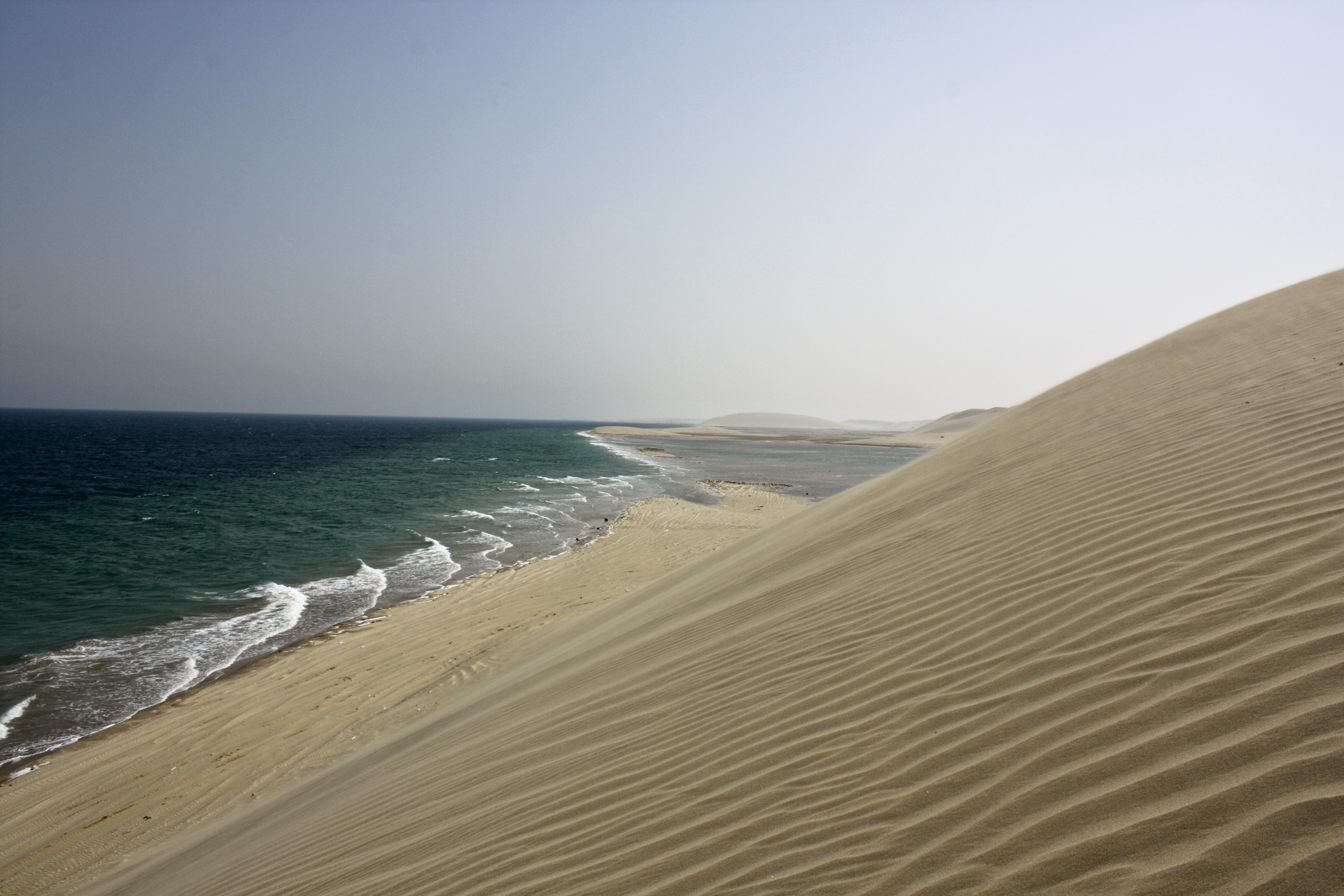
View of sand dunes and coastline of Al Wakrah beach.

Near Jebel Al Wakrah, the coastline's topography is characterized by the presence of relict coastal dunes composed of eolianite, a sedimentary rock formed by the lithification of wind-deposited sand. These geological formations, now manifesting as low-relief hills, date back to the Late Pleistocene epoch, coinciding with a period of lower eustatic sea levels.

=== Al Wakrah Spit ===
The Al Wakrah Spit is a sandy, narrow spit that extends approximately 2.5 km (1.6 mi) into the Persian Gulf, forming a natural barrier. Historically, the spit was connected to the mainland at its northern extremity. However, it separated from the shore by 1973. The morphology of the spit is characterized by two distinct inlets that bisect its length, creating a series of sandy ridges. The spit's form and orientation is largely determined by the dominant north-westerly wind, referred to as the shamal.

To the west of the spit lies a lagoon which experiences a tidal range typical of the eastern Qatar coast, averaging between 0.5 metres (1 ft 8 in) and 1 metre (3 ft 3 in). The offshore area adjacent to the spit is characterized by sand banks, formed through the action of longshore currents.

The sedimentary composition of the spit is a heterogeneous mixture of white oolitic sand, shell fragments, and detritus from coral reefs. Occasional storm events result in wave overtopping, depositing sand onto the muddy substrate of the sheltered lagoonal area to the west.

=== Wildlife ===
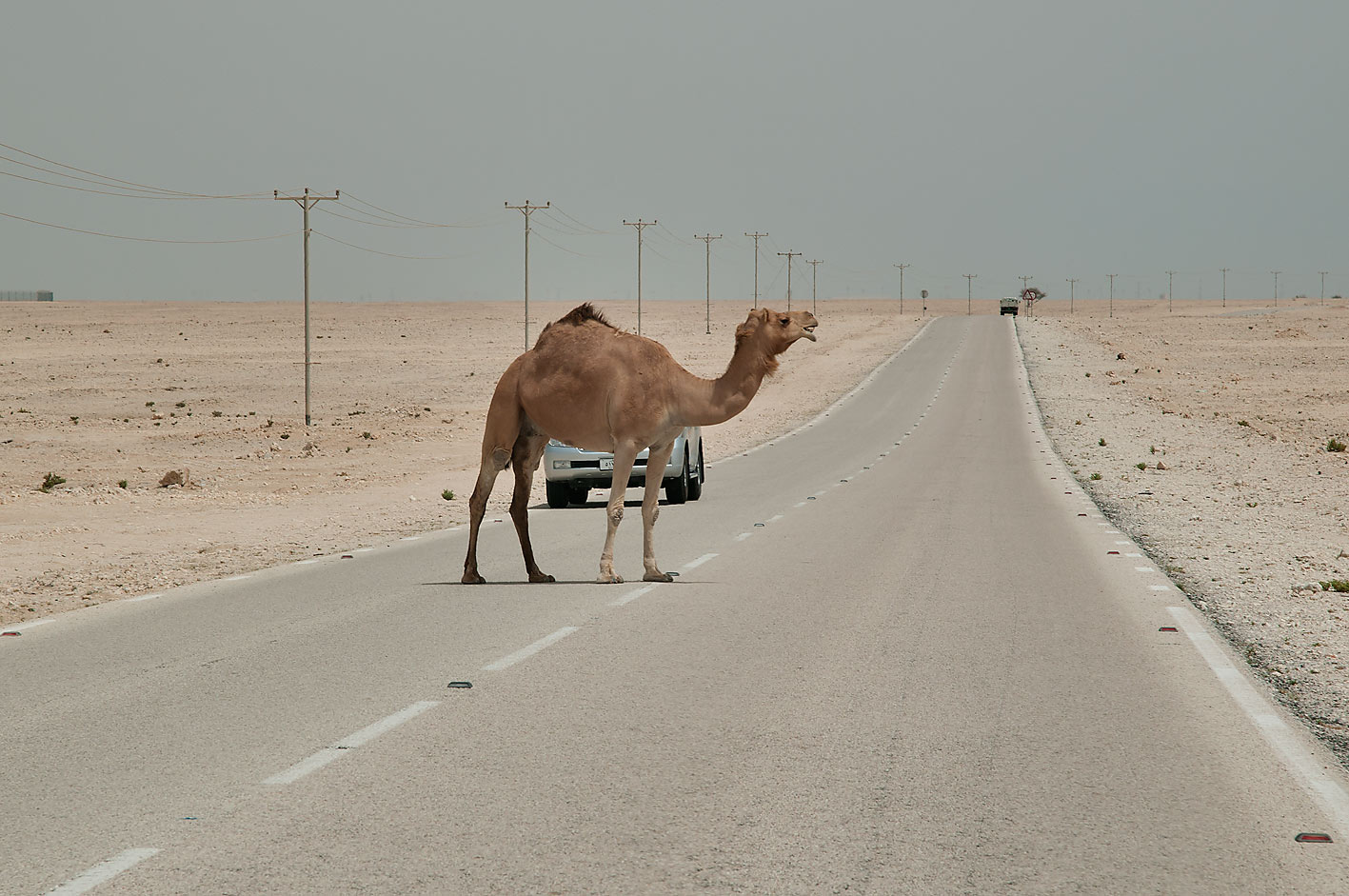
Camel crossing the road near Al Wakrah

Common vegetation found in Al Wakrah include horbith (Leobordea platycarpa), jrnah (Monsonia heliotropioides), woolly-winged milkwort (Polygala erioptera) evening stock (Matthiola longipetala), kebaisha (Erodium glaucophyllum), and lomi albar (Atractylis carduus). Other common flora found around the area of Jebel Al Wakrah are rigid flax (Linum strictum) and barseem (Hymenocarpos circinnatus).

In the 1980s, Al Wakrah saw the afforestation of the mangrove species Avicennia marina as part of a broader initiative to prevent coastal erosion and habitat loss along Qatar's coastline. The seedlings planted in Al Wakrah and other coastal areas have since grown into thriving forests. Roughly 112 hectares (280 acres) of mangroves are found off Al Wakrah's coast as of 2015.

In the southern region of Al Wakrah, honey badgers (locally al zerembal) have been observed.

=== Climate ===
Similar to other cities in Qatar, Al Wakrah has a mild average temperature in January, February, March, November and December. The summer season is in April, May, June, July, August, September, October and November. Al Wakrah has dry periods in January, February, March, April, May, June, July and August. On average, the warmest month is July and the coolest month is January.

Climate data for Al Wakrah
Month	Jan	Feb	Mar	Apr	May	Jun	Jul	Aug	Sep	Oct	Nov	Dec	Year
Mean daily maximum °C (°F)	22 (72)	23 (73)	27 (81)	32 (90)	38 (100)	41 (106)	42 (108)	41 (106)	39 (102)	35 (95)	30 (86)	24 (75)	33 (91)
Mean daily minimum °C (°F)	13 (55)	14 (57)	17 (63)	21 (70)	25 (77)	28 (82)	29 (84)	29 (84)	27 (81)	23 (73)	20 (68)	15 (59)	22 (71)
Average precipitation mm (inches)	12.7 (0.50)	17.8 (0.70)	15.2 (0.60)	7.6 (0.30)	2.5 (0.10)	0 (0)	0 (0)	0 (0)	0 (0)	0 (0)	2.5 (0.10)	12.7 (0.50)	71 (2.8)
Source: weather.com

== Historic architecture ==
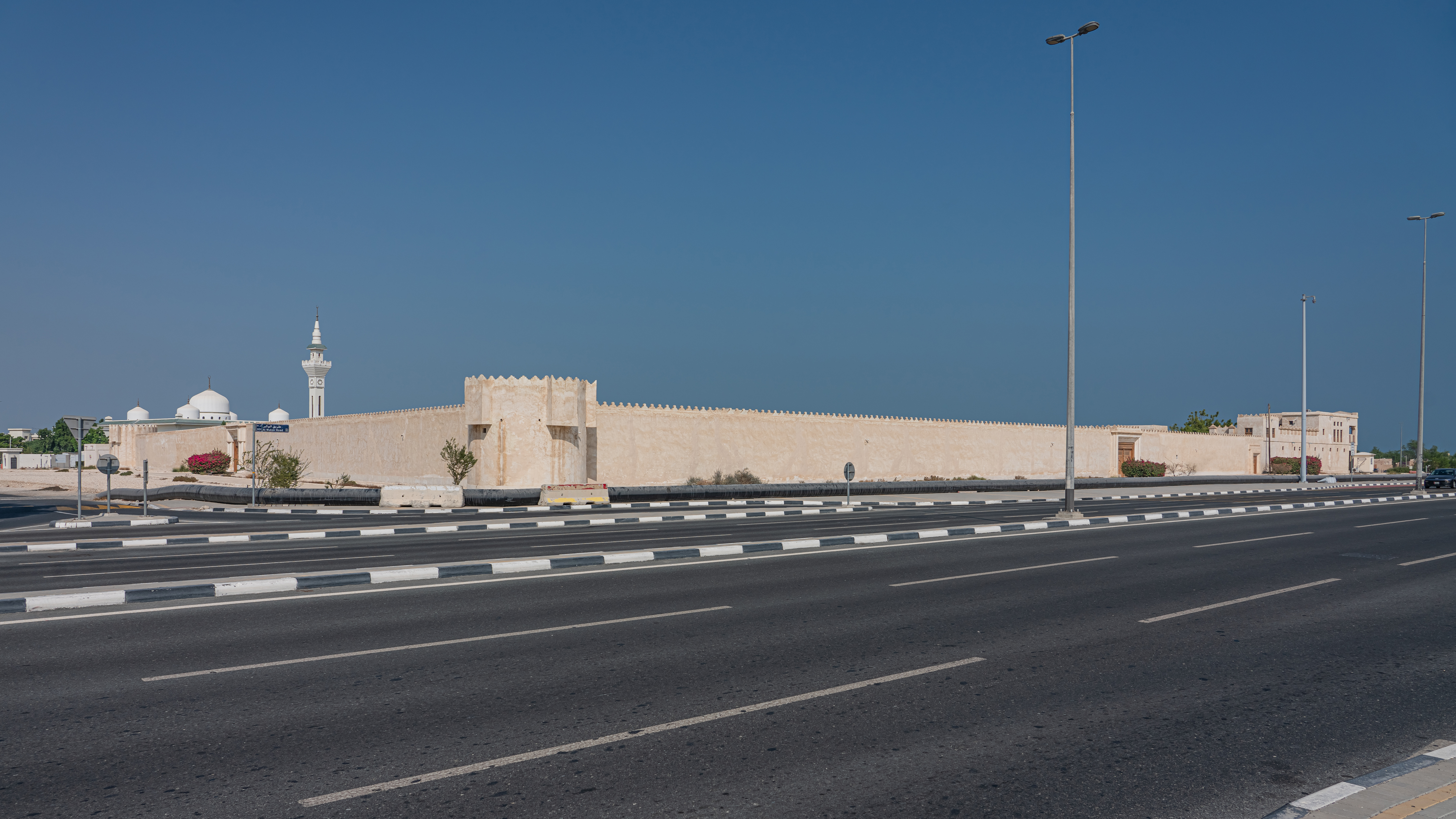
Al Wakrah Fort in 2024.

Historic architecture is abundant in Al Wakrah, particularly in its coastal areas, and it is captured in mosques, old homes, and the harbour. One significant landmark is the Al Wakrah Fort, which dates back to the early 20th century. It was built above the ruins of an older fort that had belonged to the Sheikh Abdulrahman bin Jassim Al Thani. It has two round towers and was previously used as a police office. Date presses (known locally as madabis) were discovered within the confines of the Al Wakrah Fort. Strategically constructed with military objectives in mind, these madabis served as vital nutritional reservoirs for soldiers amidst extended periods of political turbulence. More historic wind towers are found in the city than in anywhere else on the peninsula.

=== Houses ===
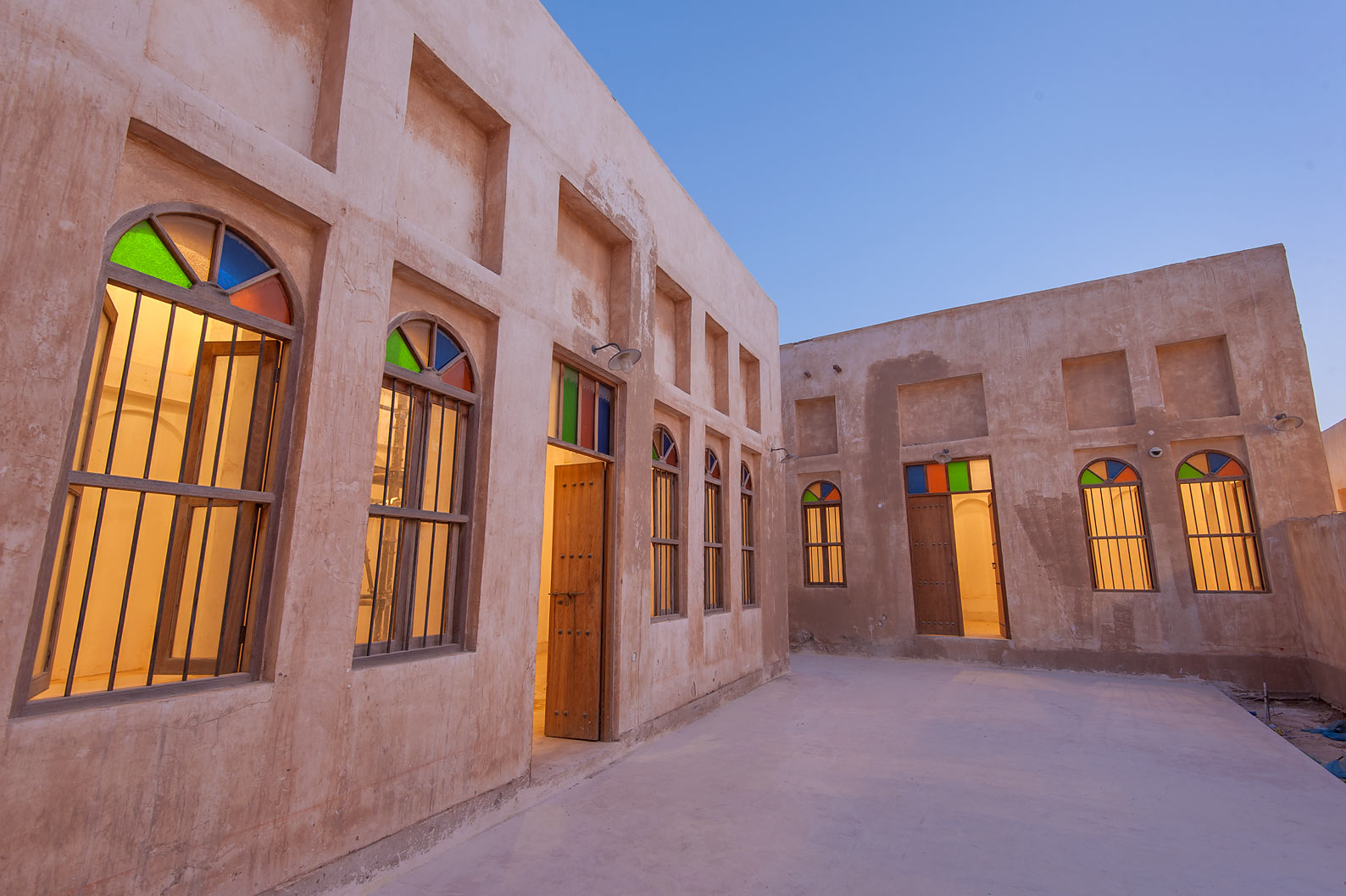
Traditional Qatari houses in Al Wakrah Heritage Village.

The house of Sheikh Ghanim Bin Abdulrahman Al-Thani, located on the beach, is considered to be an important historic landmark. This building has two storeys and its windows were designed to represent ornamental shapes. It was refurbished in 2004 under the supervision of the Restoration Departments of Qatar Museums Authority (QMA). Still-preserved madabis (date presses) were found here.

Abdullah bin Saad House, formerly owned by Abdullah bin Saad Al Mutallaq, is located in a remote section on the south-east coast of the city and is considered to be a historic landmark. The house was constructed in the early 20th century; most likely around 1920. After the municipality assumed ownership of the house in 1984, it was renovated two years later and eventually re-opened as a museum.

=== Mosques ===
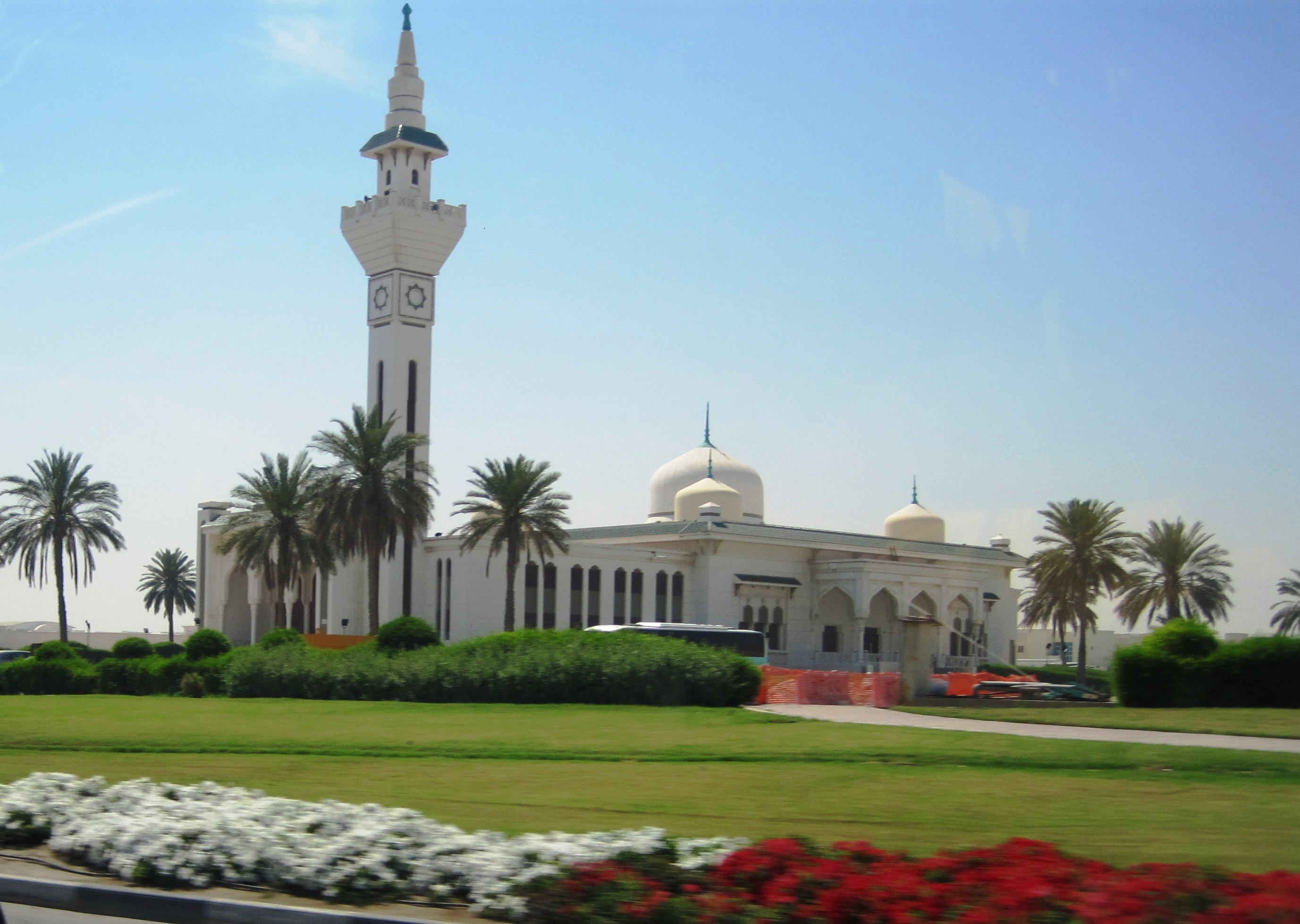
Hamza Bin Abdulmotaleb mosque in Al Wakrah.

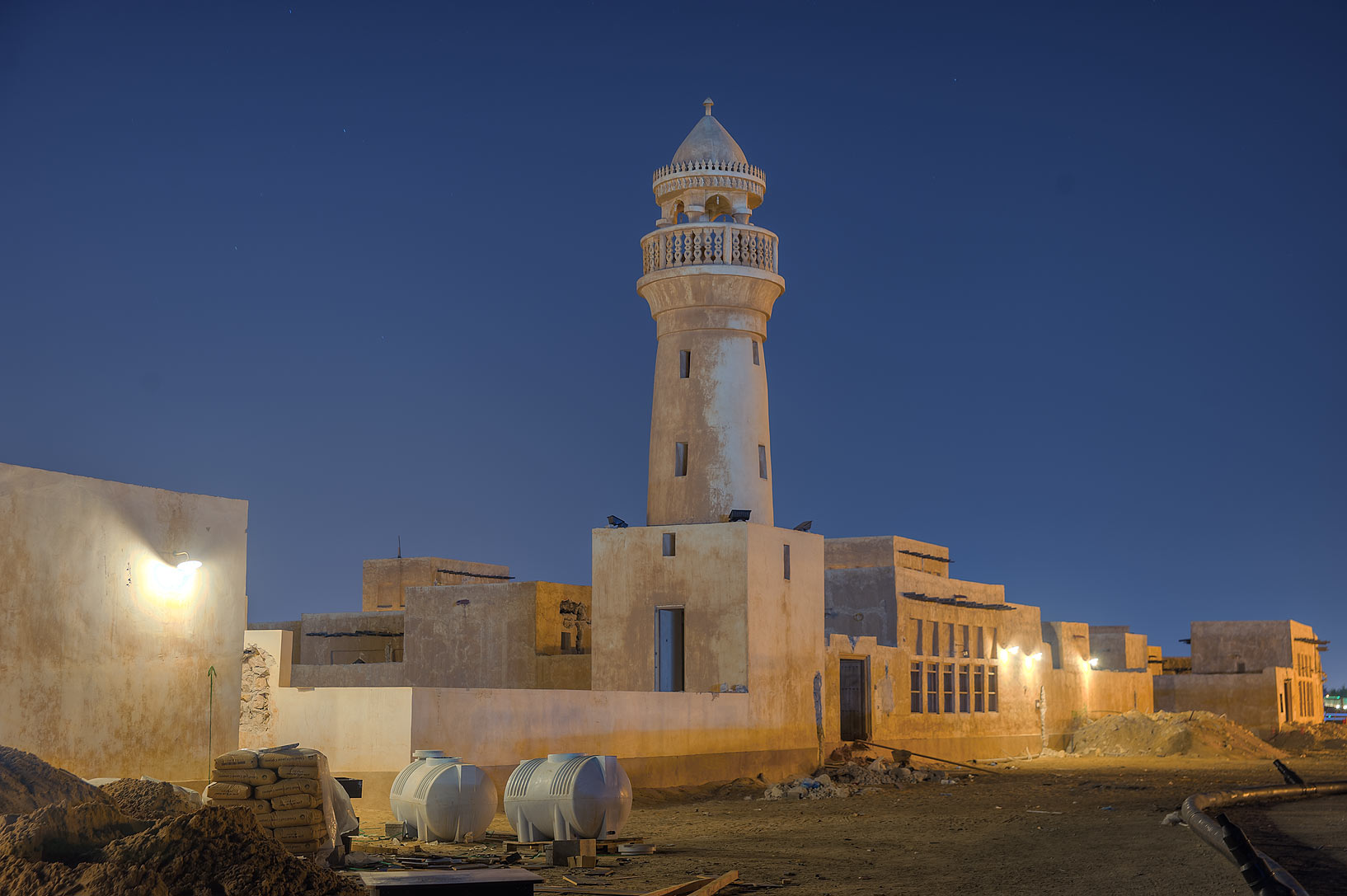
Restored mosque in Al Wakrah.

Previously, Al Wakrah's largest mosque was Al Ayouni Mosque, constructed around 1935. It was built near the coast because it was the most active and populated section of the city. After a new mosque was built closer to the main road, the mosque became defunct. It has a square shape, measures 17 by 16 m (56 by 52 ft), and lies 67 cm (26 in) above ground elevation. A rare characteristic of the mosque is its single entrance on the east side; a majority of other mosques in Qatar constructed during this period had three entrances. The outdoor praying area is accessible from five pathways separated by narrow columns. Adjacent to this is the prayer hall, which can be accessed from three different entrances in the outdoor area.

Abu Manaratain Mosque, a relatively small mosque, was erected in 1940 near the shore. It may have previously had two minarets, as its name indicates. It measures 8 by 27 m (26 by 89 ft). In the past, there was another mosque that neighbored Abu Manaratain on the west, but it was later disassembled. There are five entrances to the mosque. The minaret is funnel-shaped and extends 9 m (30 ft) high. There is no outdoor praying area; only an indoor prayer hall.

Built around 1940, the Al Subaiei Mosque, near Al Wakrah Museum, has since been renovated, with older building materials being replaced by concrete blocks. It has been used continuously since its construction. As a result of continuous additions and structural improvements, it now measures 13 by 22 m (43 by 72 ft). The minaret has a square base and extends 5.5 m (18 ft) metres high.

== Developments ==
=== Al Wakrah Development Project ===
In 2008, municipal officials released their master plan for the development of Al Wakrah. Future plans were to heavily reflect on the city's historic pearling tradition. Developments were said to include a continuous public waterfront, a water park, a golf course, a maritime museum, several hotels and a cultural center. The project, dubbed the Al Wakrah Development Project, featured the Al Wakrah New Downtown, which was divided into seven sections, including:

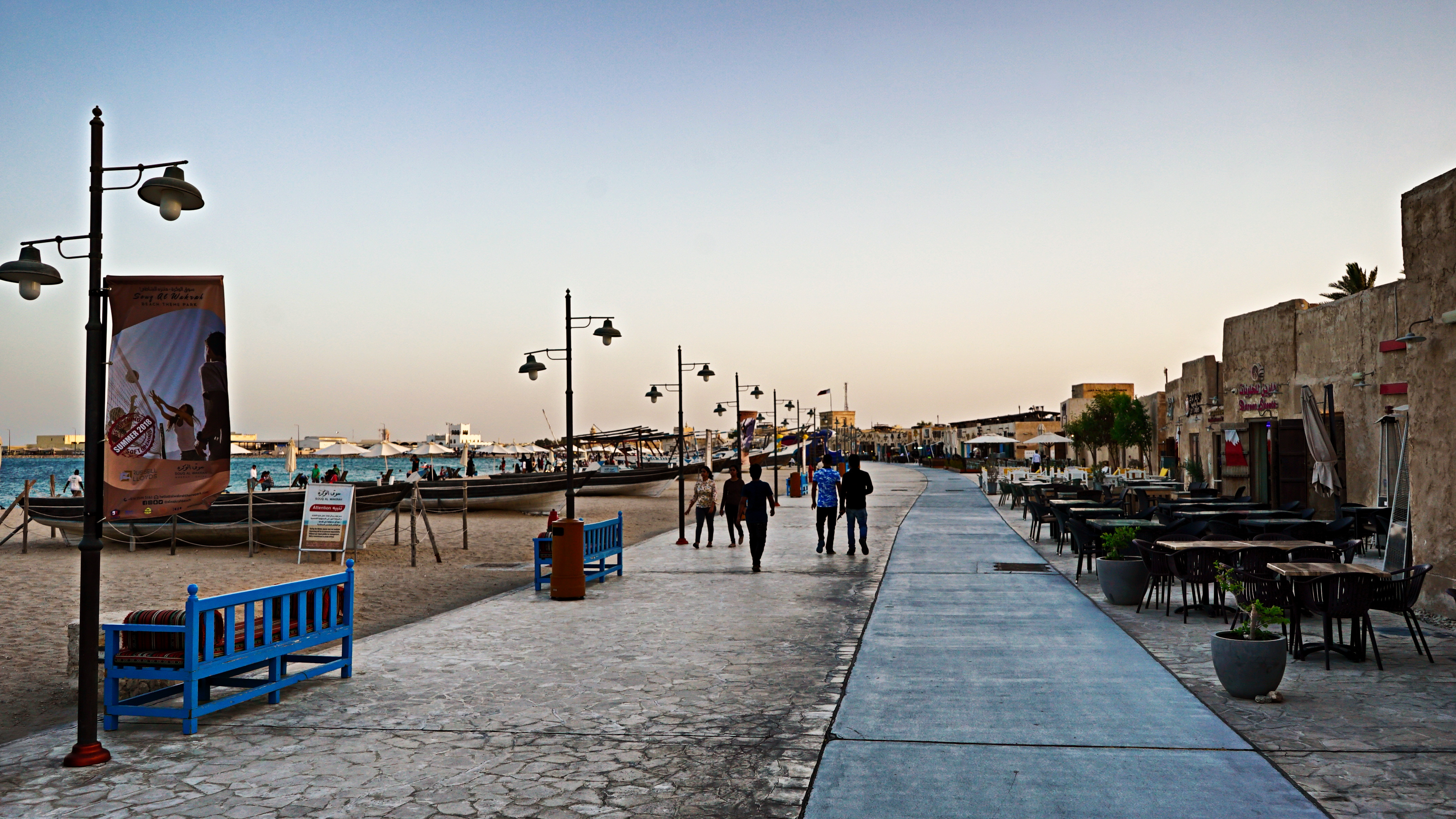
View of Souq Al Wakrah and its beach.

- The Wakrah Gateway, an exclusive zone for large-scale government offices and public services.
- South Square, which will accommodate a range of office complexes, residential units, and middle and lower-level retail outlets.
- The Festival Bay, containing a minimum of two resort hotels, several business hotels, a maritime museum, a marina, and an arts and cultural center.
- Wakrah Sands will host the main family attractions, such as family parks, recreation precincts, and retail and cultural establishments.
- Wakrah Residence will mainly act as a housing area, being set to contain multi-purpose residential complexes.
- Wakrah College, a segment for Al Wakrah's educational institutions.
- Wakrah Trade Center is purposed for malls and retail complexes.

The Al Wakrah Development Project was part of the more extensive Qatar National Master Plan, which outlined several urban development goals for the future. The plan's goals for Al Wakrah were devised on the notion that the city's population would increase to 600,000 by 2030. Currently, it is unknown whether the Al Wakrah New Downtown project and the other smaller-scale projects are still underway or have been abandoned.

=== Al Wakrah Main Road Project ===
Ashghal (the Public Works Authority) embarked on a QR 600 million overhaul of the city's road system in late 2018. As part of the project, 9 km (5.6 mi) of road extending from G-Ring Road to Mesaieed Road underwent development. This included converting the main road from two lanes to three lanes, installing an additional four intersections, and converting roundabouts to controlled intersections. Furthermore, a tunnel that runs in both directions for 160 m (520 ft) starting at Al Wakrah Metro Station was constructed. Pedestrians and cyclists also received an additional 6.1 km (3.8 mi) of exclusive paths. The project was carried out in three distinct phases and was originally anticipated to be completed by 2020. Later, the completion date was revised to late 2024.

== Visitor attractions ==
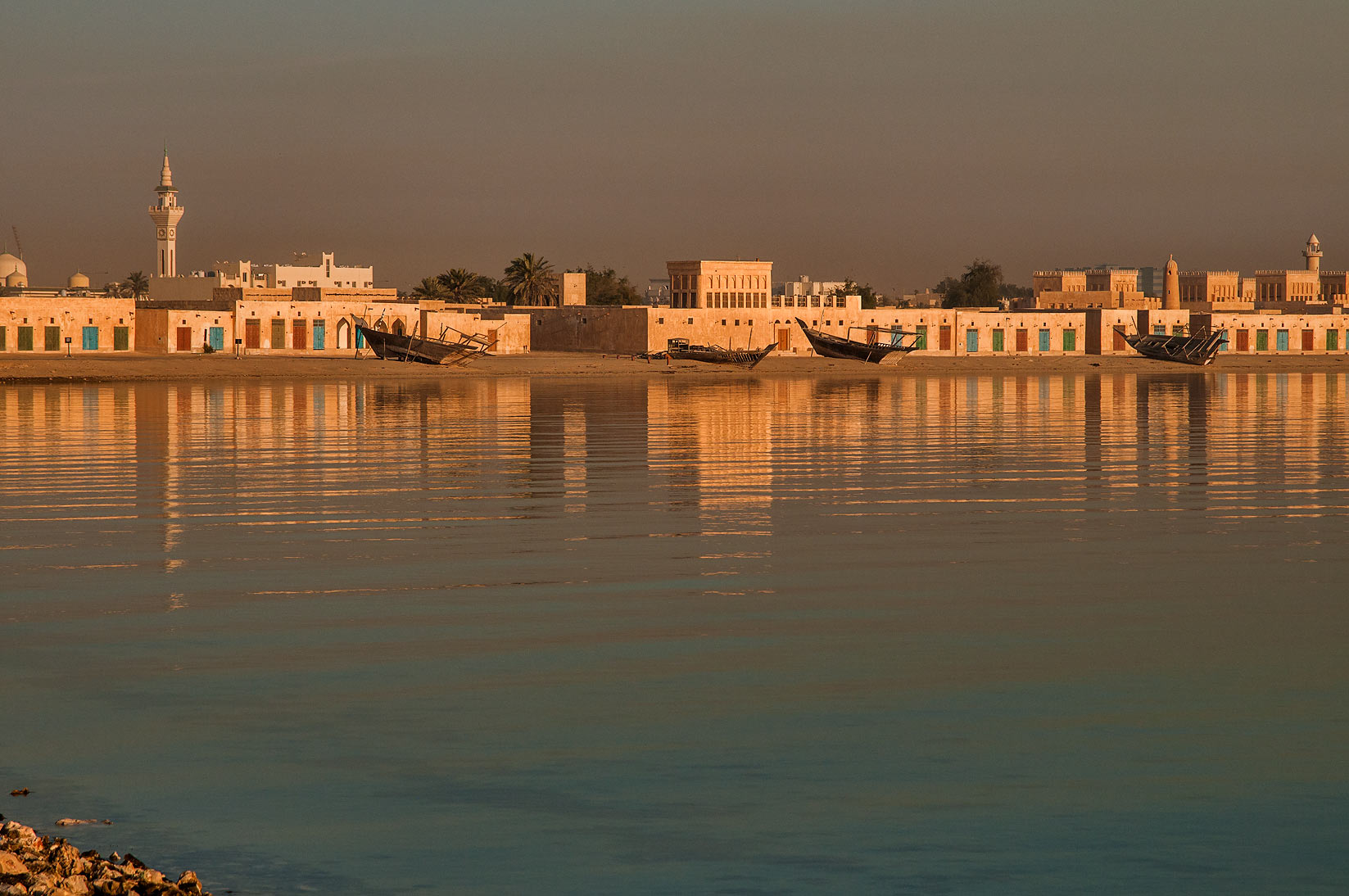
View of Al Wakrah Heritage Village from a pier.

A large quota of public parks and entertainment projects has been allocated for Al Wakrah. One of the most significant projects was Al Wakrah Heritage Village. The village includes Souq Al Wakrah, Al Wakrah Corniche, and a gated mosque stretching over 3 km of waterfront next to Al Wakrah Port. The village was first conceived of as part of the Al Wakrah Development Project, which was unveiled to the public in 2008. Six years after first being announced, the village officially opened in December 2014. There are more than a hundred shops in the souq selling traditional crafts as well as several restaurants.

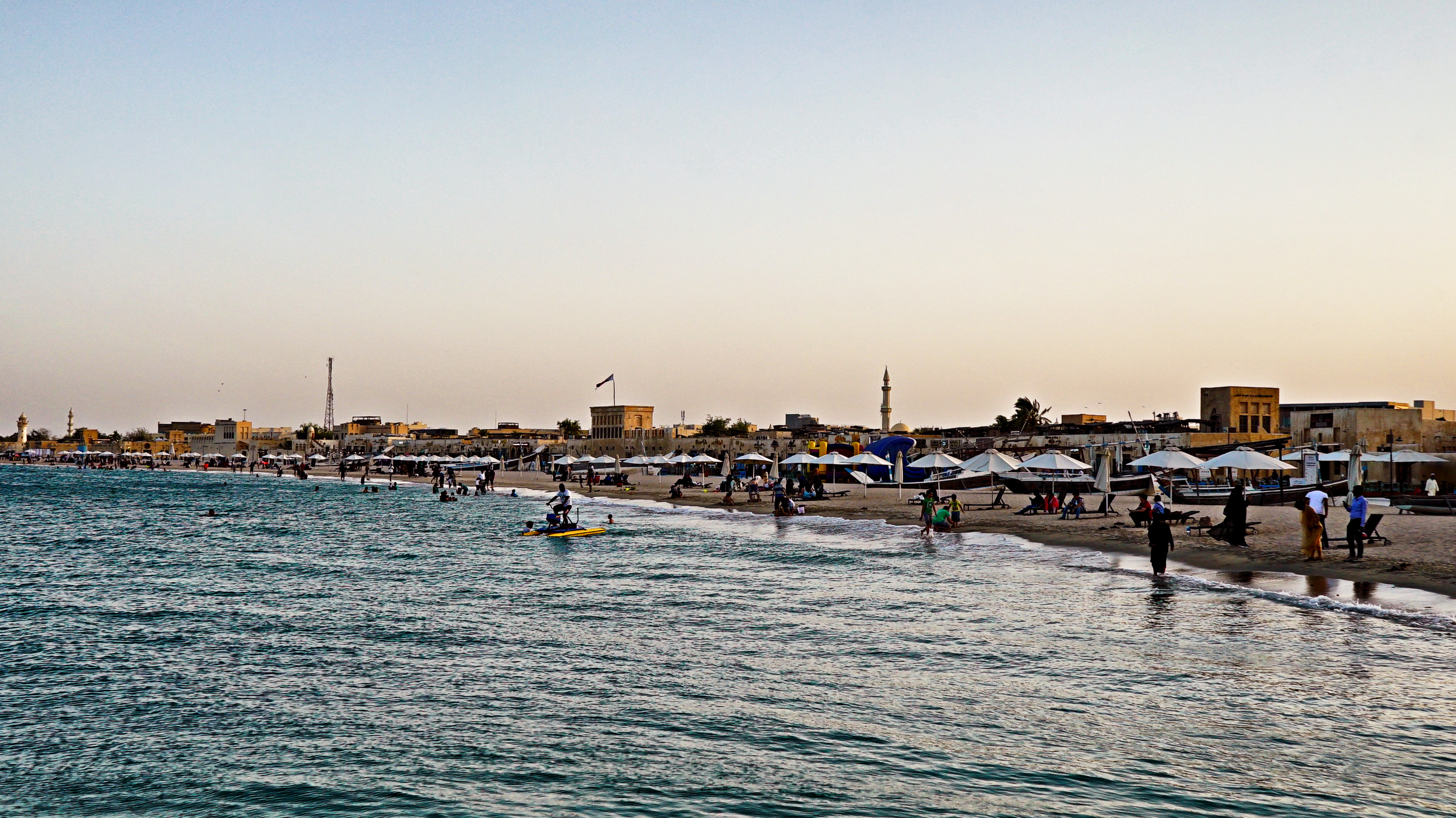
The beach at Souq Al Wakrah.

The construction of the Wakrah Mall, the multi-storeyed mall located opposite Al Wakra Hospital, was launched by the Ezdan Group. In December 2016, the mall was officially opened to the public, with over 40,000 ft^{2} (3,700 m^{2}) of retail space.

=== Public beaches ===
There are two main public beaches in the city, Souq Al Wakrah Beach and Al Wakrah Family Beach. They are located a few minutes apart from each other. Souq Al Wakrah Beach was opened to the public in mid-2017 as a family-oriented beach which also caters to certain water sports. Initially, the beach was free of charge but this policy was revised to charge for specific activities. Also located on the beach is a large playground area, which was opened in 2018. The playground contains not only children's play equipment but also has facilities for playing football and volleyball.

Al Wakrah Family Beach is one of the most popular beaches in the country. The beach is flat and has very low waters. Among the facilities here are a children's playground, barbecue pits, parking lots, changing rooms, and a few gazebos. There is also an area to play football and volleyball.

=== Souq Al Wakrah ===
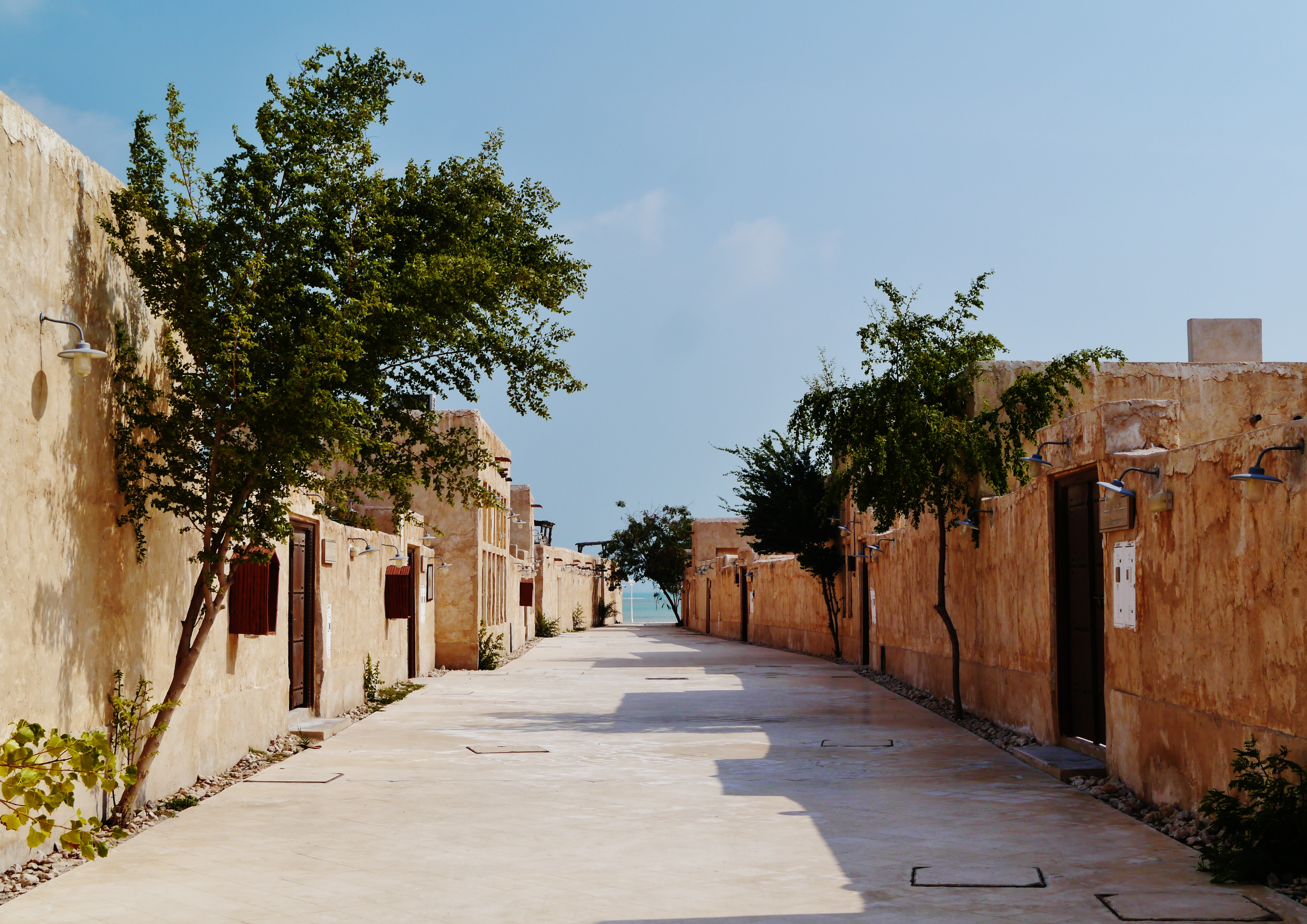
Walkway in Souq Al Wakra

Souq Al Wakrah was opened in late 2014, in conjunction with Qatar National Day. Situated directly on Al Wakrah Beach, the souq incorporates traditional architectural features and heritage elements, and includes both old-fashioned houses and commercial spaces.

The market complex includes a variety of dining establishments situated along the coastline. There are also replica dhows installed on the shore. Adjacent to the market is the Souq Al Wakrah Hotel, established in 2018 and operated by the Tivoli Hotels Group.

=== Al Wakrah Public Park ===
Constructed in the mid-1980s, Al Wakrah Public Park was the city's first park. It is spread over an area of 47,000 square meters and is accessible through the Pearl Monument. Aside from containing cycling and pedestrian tracks, hundreds of trees belonging to native species have been planted throughout the park.

== Healthcare ==
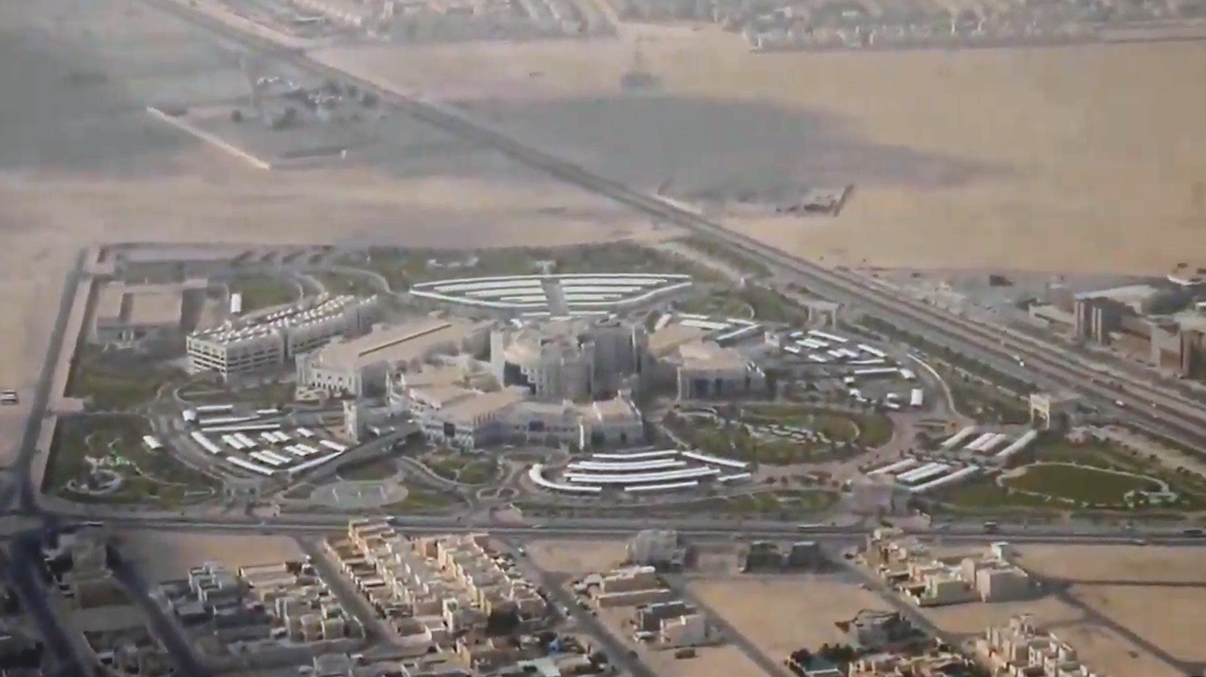
Aerial view of Al Wakrah Hospital in 2014.

Al Wakrah Hospital, a facility of Hamad Medical Corporation, opened in December 2012. It is a general hospital that has 325 beds and is staffed by 217 doctors. With its associated buildings, it covers an area of more than 300,000 m^{2}. The hospital provides modern medical and surgical facilities to Qatar's southern sector, which includes the cities of Al Wakrah and Mesaieed. The facilities contain surgical, obstetrics, gynecology, dentistry, dermatology and children's wards. A specialized diabetes center was created in December 2014.

== Education ==
Al Wakrah Public Library, the city's first library, was opened in 1985. It was the sixth library to be established in the country. At the time, the library comprised a collection of 15,000 Arabic-language books and 2,000 foreign books. A children's area was also included within the library.

The Dar Abdulrahman Darwish Fakhroo Quran Learning Center for Women is found in the center of the city.

Schools in Al Wakrah include:

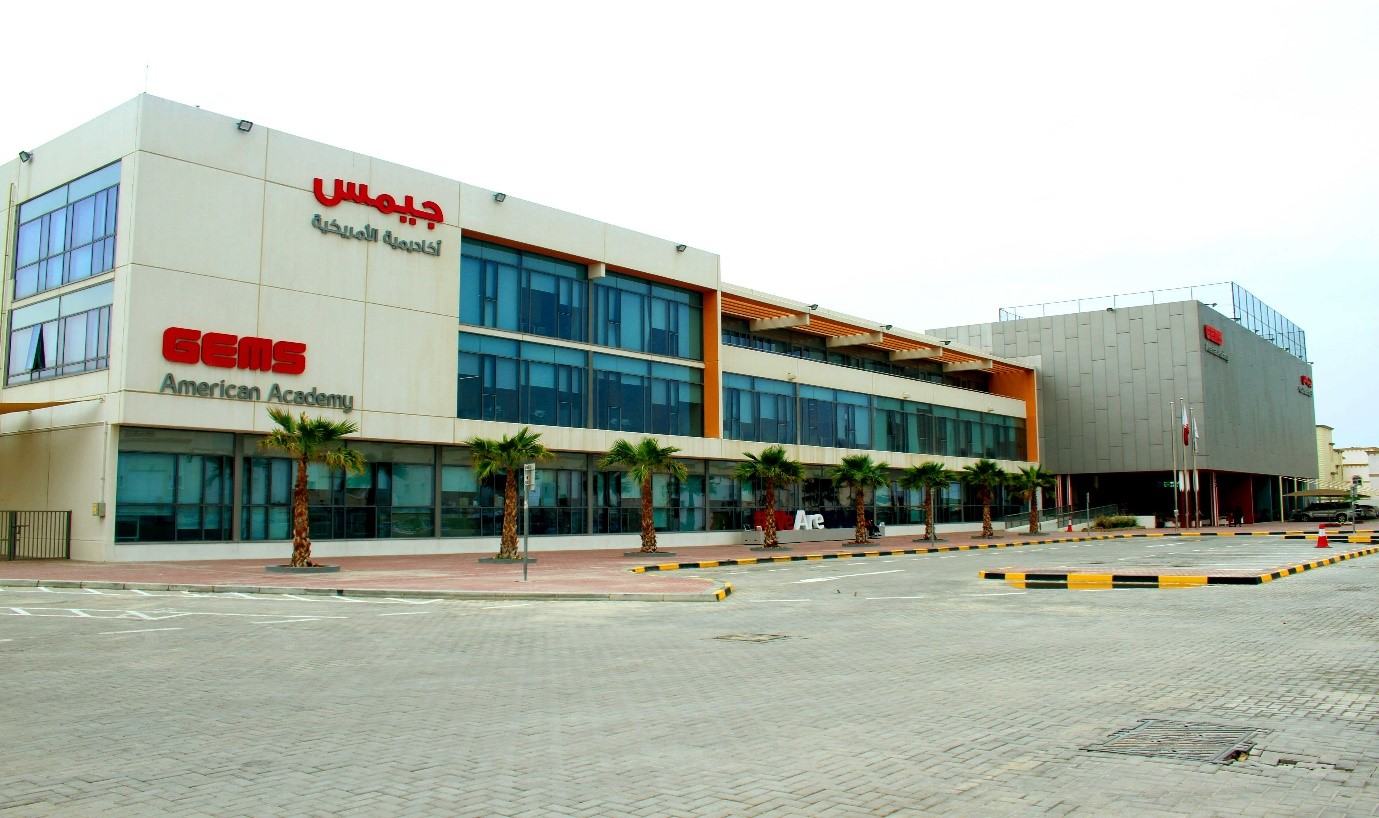
GEMS American Academy

Name of School	Curriculum	Genders	Official Website	Ref
Abdulrahman Bin Jassim Preparatory Boys School	Independent	Boys-only	N/A	
Al Bustan Private Kindergarten	American	Both	N/A	
Al Salam Independent Kindergarten	Independent	Both	N/A	
Al Salam Elementary Independent Girls School	Independent	Girls-only	N/A	
Al Sanafer Nursery	N/A	Both	N/A	
Al Shrouq Model School	Independent	Boys-only	N/A	
Al Wakrah Independent Secondary School For Boys	Independent	Boys-only	N/A	
Al Wakrah Independent Secondary School For Girls	Independent	Girls-only	N/A	
Al Zohour Nursery	British	Both	N/A	
Babies Club Nursery	British	Both	N/A	
Bait Ommy Nursery	N/A	Both	N/A	
Bhavan's Public School	Indian	Both	Home page	
Blue Bells Nursery	British	Both	N/A	
Dew Drops Nursery	British	Both	N/A	
Doha British School Al Wakra	British	Both	Home page	
English Modern School Al Wakra	British	Both	Home page	
GEMS American Academy	American	Both	Home page	
Green Apple Nursery	British	Both	N/A	
Kangaroo Kids Preschool	N/A	Both	Home page	
Little Flower Kindergarten	Indian	Both	Home page	
Our Little Treasures	N/A	Both	N/A	
Qatar Academy Al Wakra	Mixed	Both	Home page	
Saoud Bin Abdulrahman Kindergarten for Boys	Independent	Boys-only	N/A	
Saoud Bin Abdulrahman Model School	Independent	Boys-only	N/A	
Shantiniketan Indian School	Indian	Both	Home page	
DPS Modern Indian School	Indian	Both	Home Page	
Vision International School	American	Both	Home Page	

== Sports ==
Panoramic view of Al Janoub Stadium

Al Wakrah has a multi-sports club called the Al-Wakrah Sports Club, whose football team competes in the top tier of Qatari football, the Qatar Stars League. The club's home ground is the Saoud bin Abdulrahman Stadium, a multi-purpose stadium. The stadium has a capacity of 20,000 seats.

The city played a part in hosting the 2022 FIFA World Cup through Al Janoub Stadium, formerly known as Al Wakrah Stadium, which has a capacity of 40,000 spectators. In addition to the stadium, a marketplace, a school, restaurants, and parkland are all located in a central plaza. Al Wakrah Sports Club was handed control of the stadium to replace the Saoud bin Abdulrahman Stadium once the 2022 World Cup came to an end. The design of the stadium, conceived by Zaha Hadid, takes the form of the sails of a dhow.

== Transportation ==
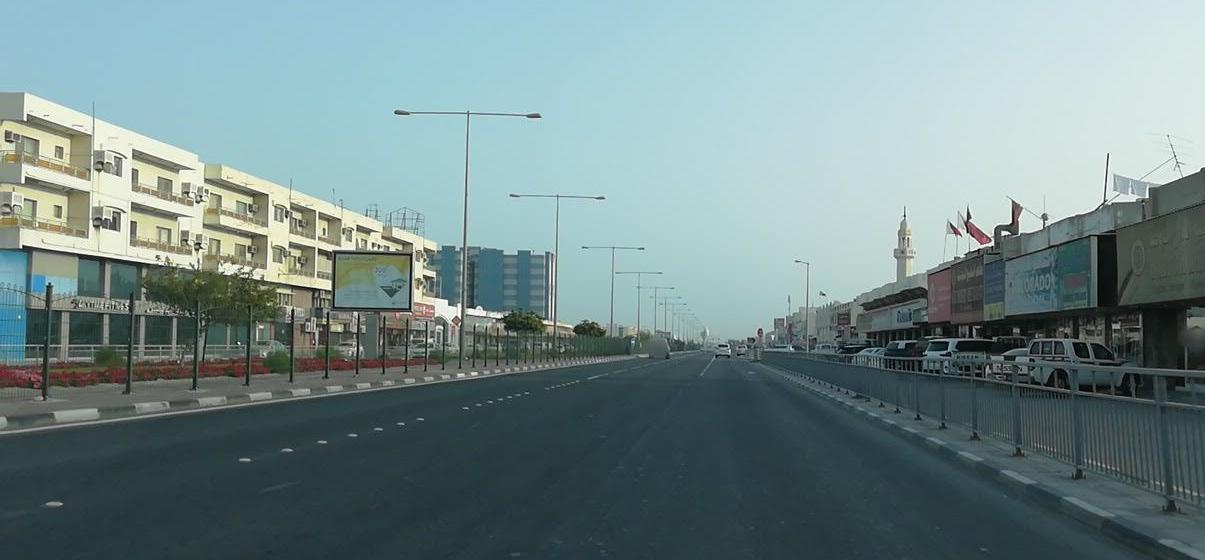
Al Wakrah Road is the main road running through the city, which also serves as a retail hotspot.

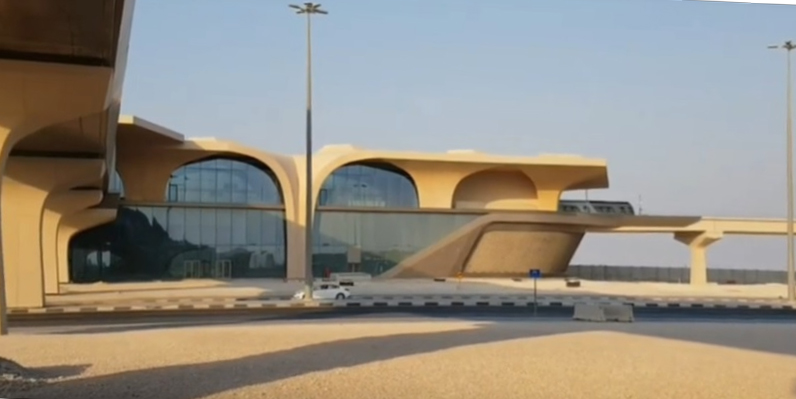
A view of Al Wakrah Metro Station.

Karwa Transportation Company (Mowasalat) has connected Al Wakrah to the rest of the cities in Qatar using its bus route. Currently, several buses are operating there.

There are roughly slightly under 3,000 streets running through Al Wakrah. Transit between Wakrah and the capital Doha is mainly facilitated by two highways: the 22 kilometres (14 mi)-long G Ring Road, completed in late 2019, and the southern section of the Doha Expressway.

Other important roads which extend through Al Wakrah proper include Al Wakrah Road and Al Wukair Road. Al Wakrah Road is thoroughfare boasting a 40 metres (130 ft) right-of-way, accommodating four lanes of traffic and a spacious central median measuring approximately 12 metres (39 ft) in width.

Transportation infrastructure in the city will be overhauled as part of the Al Wakrah Main Road Project launched by Ashghal in late 2018. After several delays, the estimated completion date was revised to late 2024.

=== Rail ===
The elevated Al Wakra station currently serves the Red Line of the Doha Metro. As part of the metro's Phase 1, the station was inaugurated on 8 May 2019, along with all other Red Line stations. It is located on Al Wakrah Road.

Among the station's facilities are a Masraf Al Rayyan ATM, a Qatar National Bank ATM, a prayer room, restrooms and a carpark. There are a total of five metrolinks, which is the Doha Metro's feeder bus network, servicing the station:

- M127, which serves Souq Al Wakra.
- M128, which serves Al Wakrah South.
- M130, which serves Ezdan Village 4-7 (Al Wukair).
- M131, which serves Ezdan Village 3 and 8–11 (Al Wukair).
- M134, which serves Al Wakrah South and Al Wakrah Hospital

== Administration ==
When free elections of the Central Municipal Council first took place in Qatar during 1999, Al Wakrah was designated the constituency seat of constituency no. 10. It would remain the headquarters of constituency no. 10 for the next three consecutive elections until the fifth municipal elections in 2015, when it was made the headquarters of constituency no. 20. Also included in its constituency is Mesaieed (as of the 2015 elections), Al Wukair, Ras Abu Fontas, Khor Al Adaid, Wadi Abu Saleel, Al Mashaf, and Al Naqiyan East. In the inaugural municipal elections in 1999, Ahmed Jassim Al-Muftah won the elections, receiving 57.2%, or 636 votes. Hassan Abbas Abdul Rahim was elected in the 2002 elections. He retained his seat successfully in the next two elections in 2007 and 2011. For the 2015 elections, Mansour Ahmad Yousif Al-Khater was elected municipal representative.

== Demographics ==
Historical population
Year	Pop.	±%
1986	17,245	—
1997	24,283	+40.8%
2004	31,441	+29.5%
2010	79,457	+152.7%
2015	87,970	+10.7%
c-census; e-estimate

As of the 2010 census, the city comprised 8,436 housing units and 796 establishments. There were 79,457 people living in the city, of which 75% were male and 25% were female. Out of the 79,457 inhabitants, 81% were 20 years of age or older and 19% were under the age of 20. The literacy rate stood at 98.4%.

Employed persons made up 73% of the total population. Females accounted for 12% of the working population, while males accounted for 88% of the working population.

== International relations ==
=== Twin towns and sister cities ===
Al Wakrah is twinned with:

- Ramsar, Iran (2010)
- Djougou, Benin (2014)
