= Jebel Al Wakrah =

Coordinates: 25°8′52″N 51°36′52″E

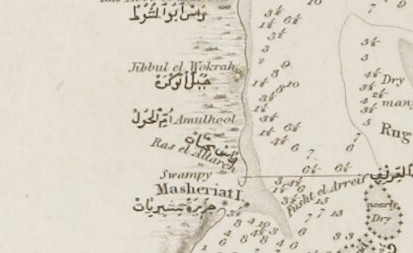
Jebel Al Wakrah labeled on an 1829 map.

Jebel Al Wakrah (Arabic: جبل الوكرة) is a hill and local landmark of the city of Al Wakrah on the eastern coast of Qatar. Located just off the shoreline, Jebel Al Wakrah is a level-topped rocky hill of brown color standing from 26 m (85 ft) to 32 m (104 ft) in height, and is visible from approximately 19 km (12 mi) away. It was formed almost entirely from wind-blown deposits.

== Etymology ==
According to the Ministry of Municipality and Environment, the city of Al Wakrah derived its name from a hill that was a popular nesting spot for birds ("wakar" in Arabic translates to "bird's nest"), most likely referring to Jebel Al Wakrah.

== History ==
In 1868, the Battle of Jebel Wakrah – the final military engagement of the Qatari–Bahraini War – took place here after Bahraini forces pursued the Qatari forces fleeing from their defeat in the Battle of Al Damsah. The Qataris defeated the Bahrainis in the ensuing battle after capturing two of their commanders, prompting the start of peace negotiations.

Archaeological artifacts were uncovered at the jebel by the Danish archaeological expedition during the 1950s and 1960s and by the British Mission led by Beatrice de Cardi in 1973.
