= Souq Al Wakrah =

Souq in Al Wakrah, Qatar

- Al Wakrah Heritage Village
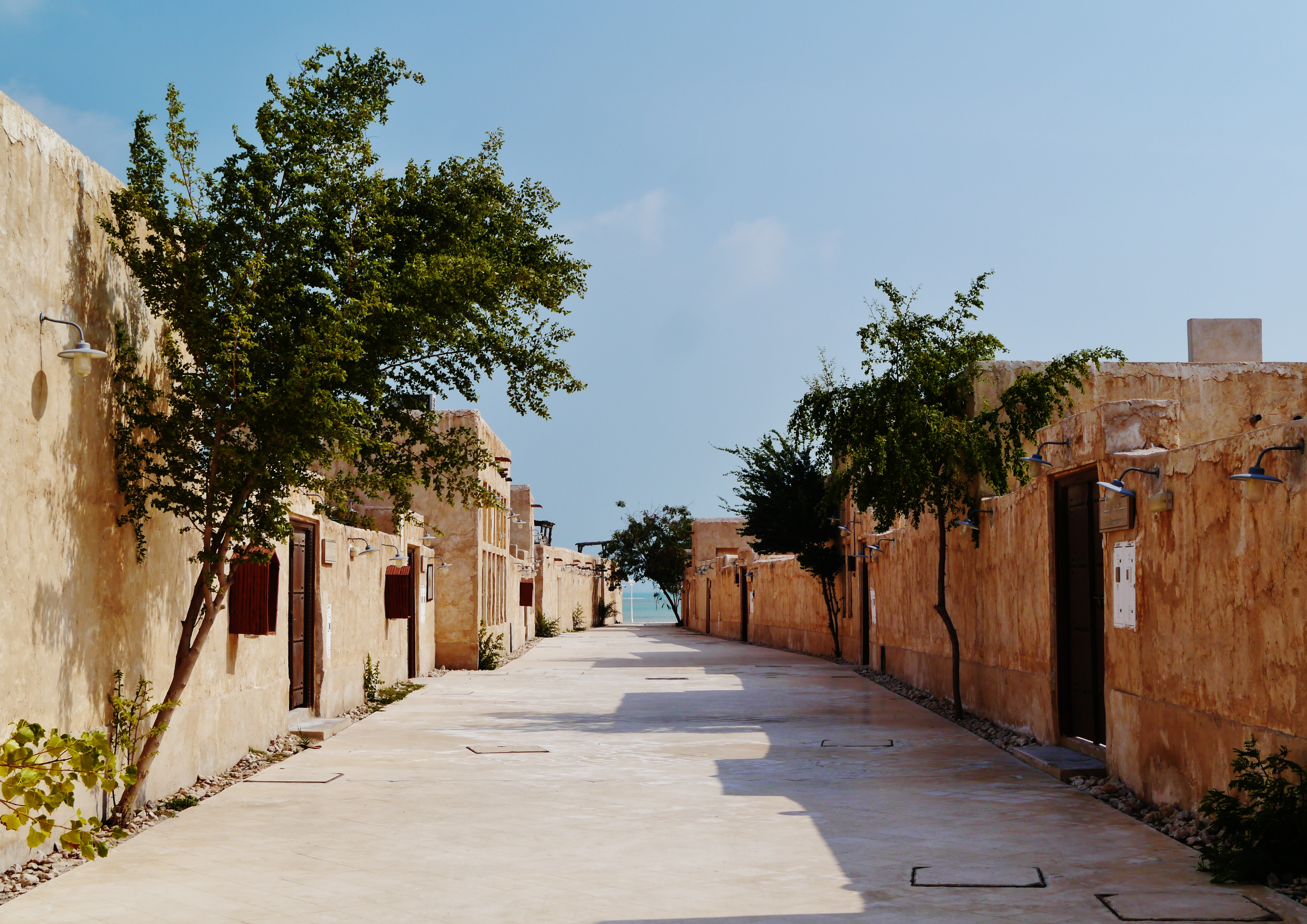
- Interactive map of Souq Al Wakrah
- Native name: سوق الوكرة (Arabic)
- Area: 0.31 square kilometres (0.12 sq mi)
- Location: Al Wakrah, Qatar
- Coordinates: 25.1709°N 51.6098°E

Construction
- Completion: 19 December 2014

Other
- Website: Official website

Souq Al Wakrah (Arabic: سوق الوكرة, lit. 'bird's nest marketplace'; also known as Al Wakrah Heritage Village) is a reconstructed traditional marketplace in the coastal city of Al Wakrah, Qatar, approximately 19 km (12 mi) south of the capital Doha. Situated directly on Al Wakrah Beach, the souq incorporates traditional architectural features and heritage elements, and includes both old-fashioned houses and commercial spaces. The souq was opened in late 2014, in conjunction with Qatar National Day.

== History ==
The development of Souq Al Wakrah was part of a broader national initiative to protect and revitalize Qatar's historical sites. The restoration of Souq Waqif in neighboring Doha, which took place between 2004 and 2008, catalyzed a new approach to historic preservation, inspiring similar projects throughout the country.

As a result, in 2008 the government devised a plan for a faithful reconstruction of the historic marketplace of Al Wakrah, aiming to recreate the atmosphere and architectural style of the original fishing village while incorporating modern amenities to serve contemporary visitors and residents. The souq was officially opened to the public on 19 December 2014, in conjunction with Qatar National Day celebrations.

== Architecture ==
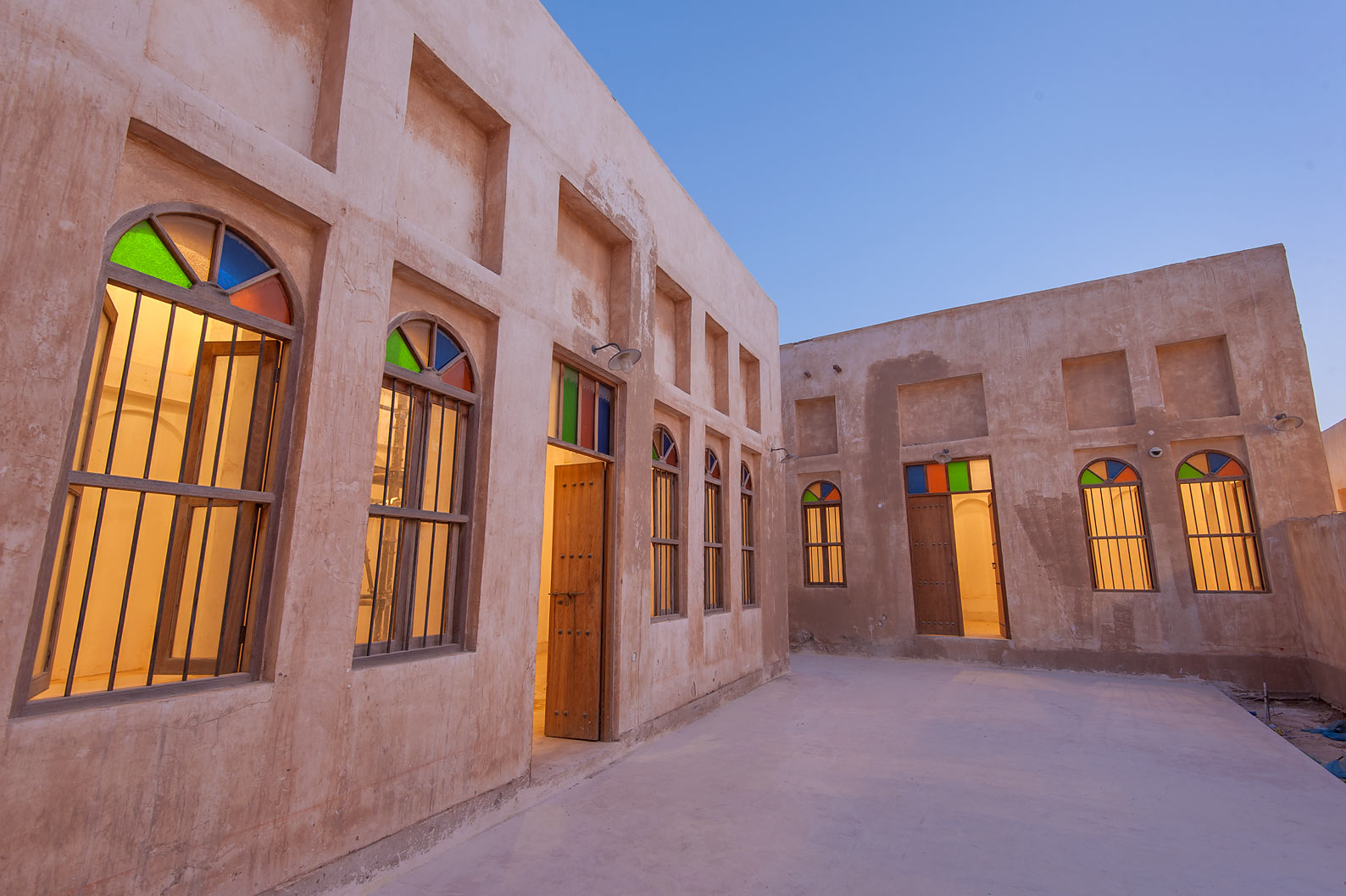
Traditional Qatari houses in the souq

=== Design ===
The design of Souq Al Wakrah reflects traditional Qatari architecture, including the exclusive usage of low-rise structures, typically not exceeding two to three stories, featuring thick masonry walls for natural insulation. Traditional building materials such as natural stone and wood were incorporated into these structures. Furthermore, the souq contains many narrow, winding alleyways characteristic of traditional Arab marketplaces. The passageways are defined by the exterior walls of rebuilt courtyard houses and compounds. Aside from showcasing Qatar's architectural heritage, these features also serve practical purposes in mitigating the effects of the region's hot desert climate.

Buildings in the souq are modeled after traditional courtyard house typology. This design approach features individual units organized around central open-air spaces, with rooms encircling these courtyards. While originally residential in nature, these structures now primarily serve commercial purposes, housing retail establishments. In contrast to this dense, traditional core, the western perimeter of the souq is defined by a substantial open area dedicated to surface parking. This wedge-shaped lot, broader at its northern end, clearly demarcates the historical-style marketplace from the modern Al Wakrah Road.

A distinctive feature of Souq Al Wakrah is its proximity to the coastline. The marketplace maintains a direct connection to the sea via a beachfront promenade. There are also replica dhows installed on the shore.

=== Layout and size ===
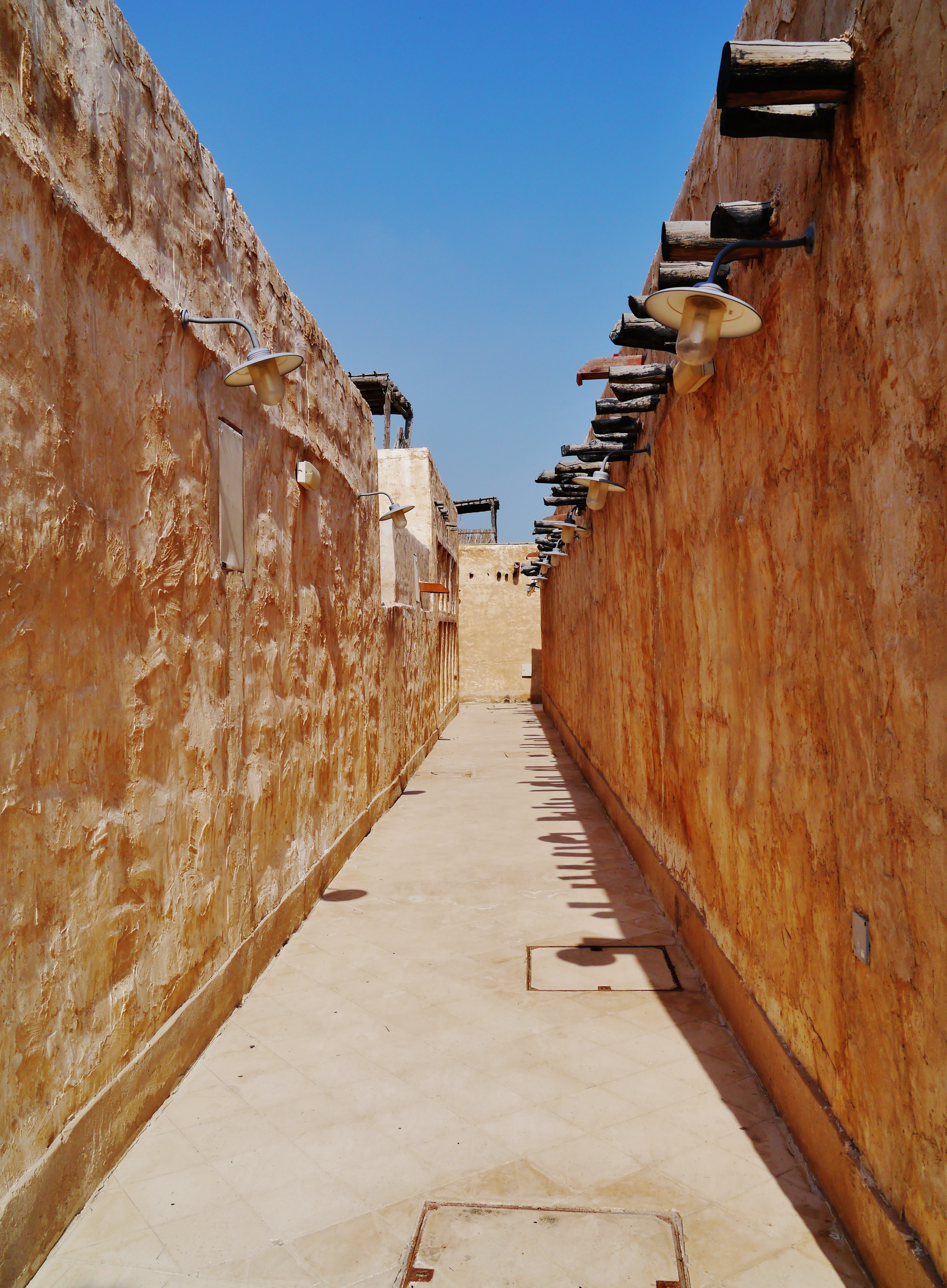
A narrow passageway in the souq

The souq has a linear north–south layout that takes advantage of its coastal location. It covers a total area of 0.31 square kilometres (0.12 sq mi). This elongated shape contrasts with the more compact, square-like layout of Souq Waqif in Doha, which occupies 0.19 square kilometres (0.073 sq mi) square kilometers. However, the size difference between the two souqs is less pronounced when considering only the central portion of Souq Al Wakrah. The middle section, excluding the northern and southern extensions (which include a large park to the north), covers approximately 0.16 square kilometres (0.062 sq mi), a more comparable area to Souq Waqif. The souq features numerous pedestrian routes that facilitate linkage, including narrow passageways.

The layout features five main thoroughfares running perpendicular to the coast, with two marking the northern and southern boundaries. A shorter north–south route near the coastal promenade further divides the northernmost section. This arrangement creates a pattern of five superblocks. This provides a framework for the narrower, winding pathways within each block. The reconstructed areas within the superblocks mimic the labyrinthine nature of historical Arab settlements.

== Attractions ==
Souq Al Wakrah's land use reflects modern planning principles, with similar types of establishments clustered into zones. Hotels are situated at the northern and southern edges of the main souq. Unlike some traditional markets, restaurants in Souq Al Wakrah are distributed throughout the area, with a notable concentration along the coastal promenade.

=== Souq Al Wakrah Beach ===
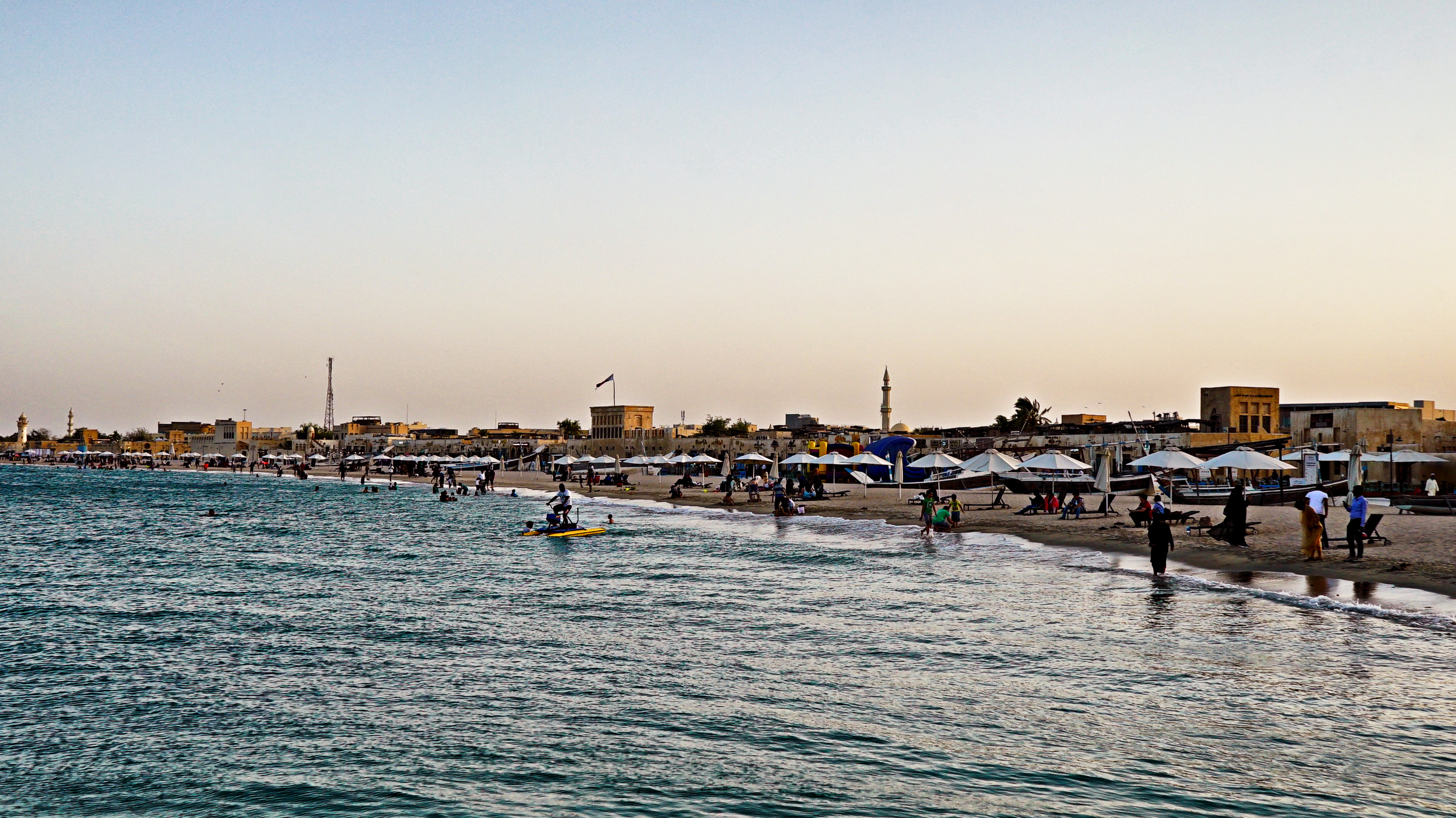
The Souq Al Wakrah Beach

The Souq Al Wakrah Beach was opened to the public in July 2017.

=== Commercial establishments ===
The market complex currently houses over 100 commercial units, offering a diverse range of retail and wholesale goods, traditional crafts, and food services. As of 2021, the souq exhibited a vacancy rate of approximately 25% in its central portion. Adjacent to the market is the Souq Al Wakrah Hotel, established in 2018 and operated by the Tivoli Hotels Group.

== Facilities ==
=== Mosques ===
Souq Al Wakrah features a high density of religious facilities, with nine mosques found in the central part of the souq. This translates to one worship location for every 17,778 square metres (191,360 sq ft). An additional five religious sites are located in the vicinity, with two within 400 metres (1,300 ft) of the geographic center.

=== Parking ===
In contrast to its Doha counterpart Souq Waqif, which largely employs underground and peripheral parking, Souq Al Wakrah maintains a more traditional approach to visitor access and parking. The primary parking facility is a surface lot situated along the western perimeter of the souq, adjacent to Al Wakrah Road, providing convenient access for visitors arriving by private vehicle. Additionally, the southern coastal areas of the souq feature informal, unpaved parking spaces. These areas offer supplementary parking options, particularly during peak visitation periods.
