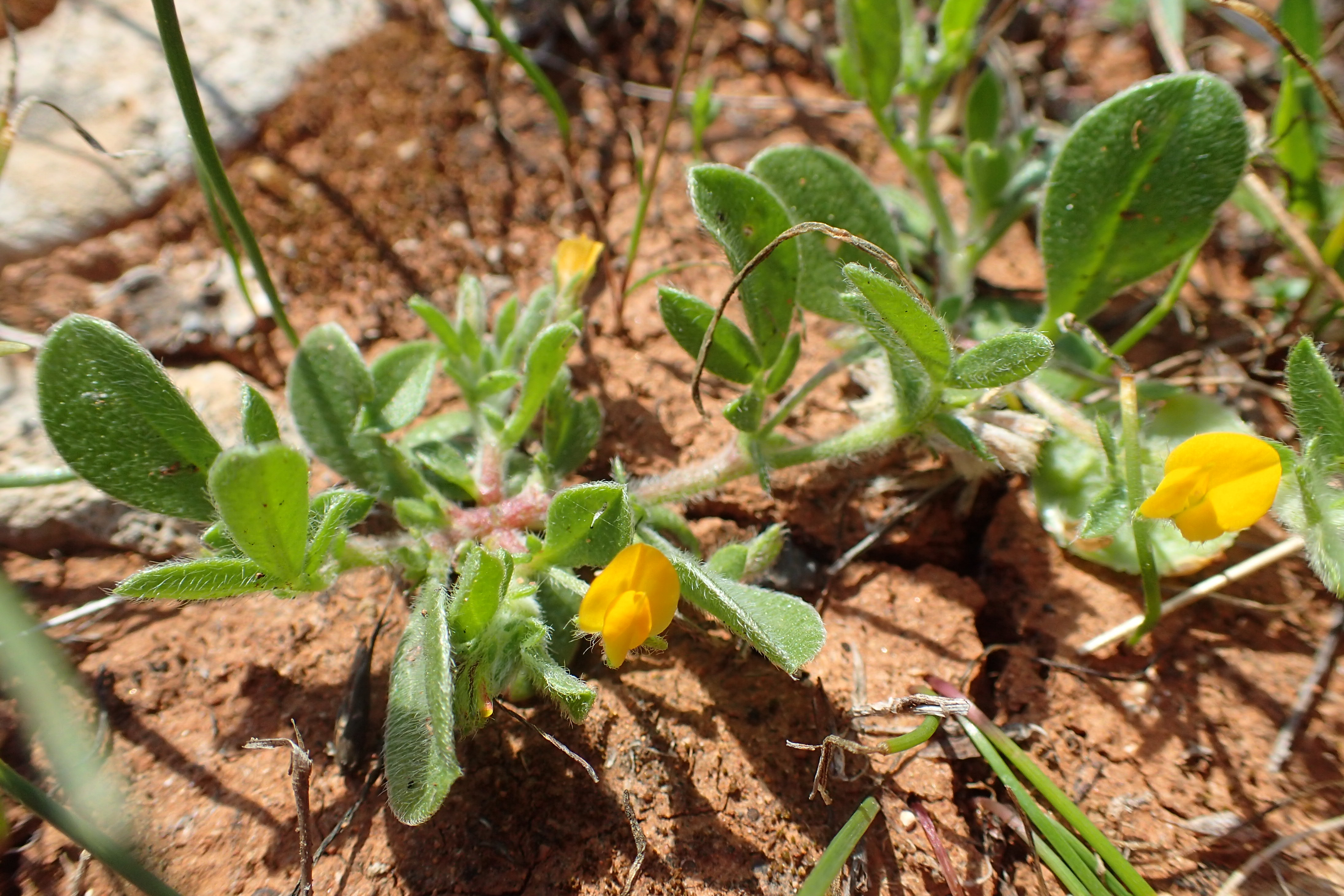

Scientific classification
- Kingdom: Plantae
- Clade: Tracheophytes
- Clade: Angiosperms
- Clade: Eudicots
- Clade: Rosids
- Order: Fabales
- Family: Fabaceae
- Subfamily: Faboideae
- Genus: Hymenocarpos
- Species: H. circinnatus

Binomial name
- Hymenocarpos circinnatus (L.) Savi

Synonyms
- Circinnus circinnatus

= Hymenocarpos circinnatus =

Species of plant

Hymenocarpos circinnatus is a species of annual herb in the family Fabaceae. They have a self-supporting growth form and compound, broad leaves. Flowers are visited by Mason bees. Individuals can grow to 30 cm tall.

== Sources ==
This article incorporates text from a free content work. Licensed under CC0 (license statement/permission). Text taken from Hymenocarpos circinnatus. Encyclopedia of Life.
