= Federation of Arab Emirates =

Proposed sovereign federal union

Federation of Arab Emirates اتحاد الامارات العربية
- 1968–1971
- Proposed flag of nine-pointed stars Emblem

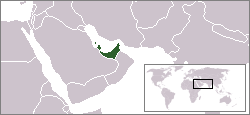
- Status: Political union
- Capital: Al Karama (proposed)
- Largest city: Abu Dhabi
- Official languages: Arabic
- Common languages: Emirati Arabic; Bahraini Arabic; Qatari Arabic

Establishment
- History
  - Dubai Accord: 27 February 1968
  - Signing of the Provisional Constitution of the United Arab Emirates: 18 July 1971
  - Bahraini Declaration of Independence: 15 August 1971
- Currency: Gulf rupee Bahraini dinar Qatari riyal Saudi riyal
Preceded by
Trucial States
Bahrain
Qatar
Succeeded by
Trucial States
Bahrain
Qatar
- Today part of: Bahrain; Qatar; United Arab Emirates; Saudi Arabia

The Federation of Arab Emirates (FAE) (Arabic: اتحاد الامارات العربية), also sometimes Union of Arab Emirates, was a proposed sovereign federal union of nine sheikhdoms of Britain's Persian Gulf Residency, comprising Bahrain, Qatar and the rest of seven emirates of the Trucial States, namely Abu Dhabi, Dubai, Umm Al Quwain, Ajman, Sharjah, Ras Al Khaimah and Fujairah. The union existed during much of the unification of the United Arab Emirates and came into being as a semblance of a transitional government in February 1968 following a meeting between the leaders of these emirates in less than two months after the British decision of withdrawal was announced. However, several disagreements between the leaders due to political and economic reasons led to the dissolution of the union when Bahrain and Qatar announced their respective independence by August and September 1971 whereas the rest of the Trucial States (with the temporary exception of Ras Al Khaimah) went on to form the United Arab Emirates in December 1971.

According to Dr. Emile Nakhleh, the-then associate professor of political science at Mount Saint Mary's College and Seminary, in his book Arab-American Relations in the Persian Gulf, said several factors led to its disintegration. such as the federal structure being a hurried reaction to the announced British withdrawal, and the call for federation was prompted by leaders of the individual emirates determined to preserve their rule, unresolved disputes still outstanding, the most important of which was the one between Saudi Arabia and Abu Dhabi over the Buraimi oasis and the disparities in wealth, education and population among the emirates that added fuel to the fire.

== History and background ==
Following the expulsion of the Portuguese from Bahrain in 1602, the Al Qasimi, the tribes extending from the Qatari Peninsula to the Ras Musandam, adopted maritime raiding as a way of life due to the lack of any maritime authority in the area. The attacks surged in the beginning of 19th century.

In the aftermath of a series of attacks in 1808 off the coast Sindh involving 50 Qasimi raiders and following the 1809 monsoon season, the British East India Company, with the naval support of the British government, launched an operation against the Al Qasimi tribe ruling Ras Al Khaimah in 1809. An agreement was reached between the Al Qasimi and the British with regards to maritime security, however, the agreement broke down in 1815. In 1815, the crew of a British Indian vessel were captured by Qawasim near Muscat and most of the crew were murdered. Then, on 6 January Al Qasimi captured an armed pattamar, the Deriah Dowlut, off the coast of Dwarka and murdered 17 of its 38 Indian crew. In the Red Sea, in 1816, three British-flagged Indian merchant vessels from Surat were taken and most of the crews killed.

As piracy resumed, the British returned in 1819 with a punitive expedition against the maritime force of Al Qasimi, which was now split into two emirates, one the Wahhabi-backed Ras Al Khaimah and other in Sharjah and Lengeh. The British devastated Ras Al Khaimah and ended up deposing Hassan bin Rahma Al Qasimi from power before signing the General Maritime Treaty of 1820 with the rulers of Abu Dhabi, Sharjah, Ajman, Umm Al Quwain, Ras Al Khaimah. In 1853, the treaty of Perpetual Maritime Truce was signed which prohibited any act of aggression at sea and was signed by Abdulla bin Rashid Al Mualla of Umm Al Quwain; Humaid bin Rashid Al Nuaimi of Ajman; Saeed bin Butti of Dubai; Saeed bin Tahnun Al Nahyan and Sultan bin Saqr Al Qasimi.

In response to the ambitions of France and Russia, Britain and the Trucial Sheikhdoms established closer bonds in an 1892 treaty, sheikhs agreed not to dispose of any territory except to Britain and not to enter into relationships with any other foreign government without Britain's consent. In return, the British promised to protect the Trucial Coast from all aggression by sea and to help in case of land attack.

=== Trucial States Council and the idea of federation ===
The Trucial States Council was a forum for the leaders of the emirates to meet, presided over by the British Political Agent. The first meetings took place in 1952, one in spring and one in autumn, and this set a pattern for meetings in future years. The council was purely consultative and had no written constitution and no policy making powers, it provided more than anything a forum for the rulers to exchange views and agree on common approaches. The British managed to provoke considerable irritation amongst the rulers, especially Sharjah and Ras Al Khaimah, when the ruler of Fujairah, recognised as a Trucial State by Britain on 21 March 1952, attended his first Trucial States Council.

The idea of a federation between the Trucial States was first floated in the late 1950s by Michael Wright, the British ambassador to Iraq. However, it was rejected as 'fanciful' by Bernard Burrows, the political resident.

By 1958, committees were set up to advise on public health, agriculture and education, but the council had no funding until 1965, when the chairmanship moved from the Political Agent to one of the rulers, the first chairman being Shaikh Saqr bin Mohammed Al Qasimi of Ras Al Khaimah. One issue which came up regularly in the council's first 14 meetings was that of locusts—the swarms were highly destructive to the agriculture of the whole area—but the Bedouin of the interior were convinced the spraying of insecticide would be detrimental to their herds and resisted the teams brought in from Pakistan to spray the insects' breeding grounds.

In 1965 the council was given a grant by the British to administer as it saw fit, instead of merely advising on British-prepared budgets. A full-time secretariat was also recruited.

In 1967, oil was discovered in the Zararah oil field in south of Liwa Oasis and King Faisal had again claimed the area as part of Saudi Arabia in 1970. Faisal offered to resolve the dispute by relinquishing claims on Al Ain and Buraimi in exchange for assuming total control over Zararah and Khor Al Adaid. He also requested Zayed to halt the drilling by the Abu Dhabi Petroleum Company in Zararah while discussions are underway.

Zayed, however, tried to resist the Saudi pressure as the oasis had been the center of the emirate's eastern province and its capital, Al Ain. For Faisal, it was an issue of pride and honor and a reminder of past Najdi Wahhabi glories under First and Second Saudi states during 18th and 19th centuries.

=== Announcement of British withdrawal and Federation of Arab Emirates ===
British Prime Minister Harold Wilson's announcement, in January 1968, that all British troops were to be withdrawn from "east of Suez", signalled the end of Britain taking care of foreign policy and defence, as well as arbitrating between the rulers of the Eastern Persian Gulf.

The decision pitched the rulers of the Trucial Coast, together with Qatar and Bahrain, into fevered negotiations to fill the political vacuum that the British withdrawal would leave behind. A month later on 18 February 1968, Sheikh Zayed al-Nahyan met with Sheikh Rashid bin Saeed al-Maktoum and signed a union agreement between Abu Dhabi and Dubai, a turning point in the history of the Gulf considered as the prelude to the unification of the United Arab Emirates. Less than ten days later, leaders of the sheikhdoms met in Dubai and signed the Dubai Accord on 27 February 1968 for the creation of the Federation of Arab Emirates, that also included Bahrain and Qatar with a joint foreign policy, defense and citizenship. The accord outlined the system of governance where the leadership would be chosen in a pattern of annual rotations.

The first meeting of the Supreme Council of the Federation of Arab Emirates was convened in Abu Dhabi in March 1968. The meeting was intended to exchange consultations with regards to the implementation of the Dubai Accord. Further meeting was convened in Abu Dhabi in May and July 1968 in order to reach an agreement on the basis of the previous meeting. Khalifa bin Hamad Al Thani was elected as the chairman of the provisional federal council whereas Sheikh Zayed was nominated as the president. In October 1968, the second meeting was convened and Sheikh Ahmad bin Ali Al Thani was elected as the chairman of the Supreme Council.

The members of the Supreme Council met in May 1969 in Doha to discuss the shape of the constitution. They agreed to set up a cabinet, but failed to elect a ruler. The meeting was also politically affected by the tour of then British prime minister Edward Heath to the Gulf states. In the meeting, Sheikh Ahmad bin Ali was reelected as the chairman of the Supreme Council.

In October 1969, the rulers of the nine emirates met for the last time in Abu Dhabi and elected Sheikh Zayed bin Sultan al-Nahyan as the president, Sheikh Rashid bin Saeed al-Maktoum as vice president and Sheikh Khalifa bin Hamad al-Thani as the prime minister of a thirteen-member committee of the proposed federation besides the future of the capital located somewhere between Abu Dhabi and Dubai, in a place called Al Karama. However, as the leaders were preparing the final communiqué, then British Political Agent Charles Treadwell requested to address the gathering and expressed his government's aspirations that all of their disagreements shall be resolved and is in Britain's interest in the successful outcome of the session. The representatives of Qatar and Ras al-Khaimah took Treadwell's remarks as unwarranted, prompting a walk-out by Sheikh Ahmad al-Thani and Sheikh Saqr al-Qasimi, thus, withdrawing from the union over the perception of foreign interference in the Gulf's internal affairs.

The nine-state union was never to recover from the October 1969 meeting as Bahrain and Qatar opted to drop out of further talks despite efforts by British prime minister Harold Wilson, Saudi Arabia's King Faisal bin Abdulaziz and the emir of Kuwait Sabah al-Sabah to revive the negotiations.

The April 1970 constitution committed Qatar to joining Bahrain and the Trucial States in forming the proposed Federation of the Arab Emirates. In 1970, the United Nations conducted a survey in Bahrain in order to know whether the people desired Iranian control or preferred independence. Subsequently, the United Nations Security Council unanimously passed Resolution 278 in May 1970 which stated that "the overwhelming majority of the people of Bahrain wish to gain recognition of their identity in a full independent and sovereign State free to decide for itself its relations with other States". Iran renounced its claim to the island in the same month.

In May 1970, King Faisal bin Abdulaziz offered to resolve the dispute with Abu Dhabi by dropping some claims on Al Ain and al-Buraimi in exchange for exercising Riyadh's sovereignty in south of Liwa Oasis and Khor al-Udaid. Zayed subsequently said that he would "not reject the proposal out of hand".

In July 1971, the six emirates, namely Dubai, Sharjah, Ajman, Fujairah and Umm Al Quwain agreed upon forming a union by signing a provisional constitution of the United Arab Emirates in Dubai, which was somewhat of a revised document which was the basis for the Federation of Arab Emirates, thus signaling the dissolution of the latter despite the new constitution having a clause for a potential admission of an independent Arab state into the union but on the condition of assent from Federal Supreme Council. When the Iranian claim on Bahrain was settled, Bahrain demanded a representational position based on population within the Provisional Federal Council. When rejected, Bahrain declared independence in August 1971. Qatar still claimed to be in favor of the union. However, Qatar declared independence in September 1971 and amended the constitution following the coup d'état in 1972.

== Aftermath ==
In late November 1971, shortly after the withdrawal of British forces from the islands of Abu Musa and the Greater and Lesser Tunbs, the Imperial Iranian Navy under the orders of Shah Mohammad Reza Pahlavi invaded and annexed the islands, claiming both to be the part of the country's Hormozgan Province. The annexation was met with condemnations from countries like Libya and Iraq.

The union and independence of the United Arab Emirates was formally proclaimed by Sheikh Zayed al-Nahyan and was read out by Ahmed bin Khalifa al-Suwaidi on December 2, 1971, at 10:00 am from the Union House (now Etihad Museum) in Jumeirah, Dubai, a day after the termination of the special treaty relations and the official expiration of the British deadline to withdraw from the Persian Gulf. The declaration formally culminated the transfer of power from the Political Residency of the British Foreign Office to the Trucial States Council, thereby renaming the territories of the Trucial States as the United Arab Emirates before the signing of a provisional constitution by the emirs of Abu Dhabi, Dubai, Sharjah, Ajman, Fujairah and Umm al-Quwain that officially acceded these emirates into the new federal union.

A bilateral treaty was signed between the United Kingdom and the newly-formed United Arab Emirates on December 2, 1971, that guaranteed ten years of friendship and cooperation between the two states. The agreement was signed a day after the termination of the special treaty relations and a series of earlier protection treaties that were concluded between the British government and various leaders of Trucial States since 1820.

Ras Al Khaimah refused to join the union. One of the reasons of its delayed accession to the United Arab Emirates because Sheikh Saqr thought he could discover oil just like Abu Dhabi. Also he was dissatisfied with Ras Al Khaimah being given 6 seats in the parliamentary assembly, whereas Abu Dhabi and Dubai having 8 seats besides the power of joint veto. However, following the Iranian annexation of the islands of Greater and Lesser Tunbs and Abu Musa and the assassination of Sheikh Khalid in January 1971, he decided to accede on February 10, 1972.

In August 1974, Saudi Arabia and the United Arab Emirates signed the Treaty of Jeddah, which intended to resolve the Saudi Arabia – United Arab Emirates border dispute.
