= Foundation of the United Arab Emirates =

1968–1972 political and diplomatic campaign

- Part of History of the United Arab Emirates
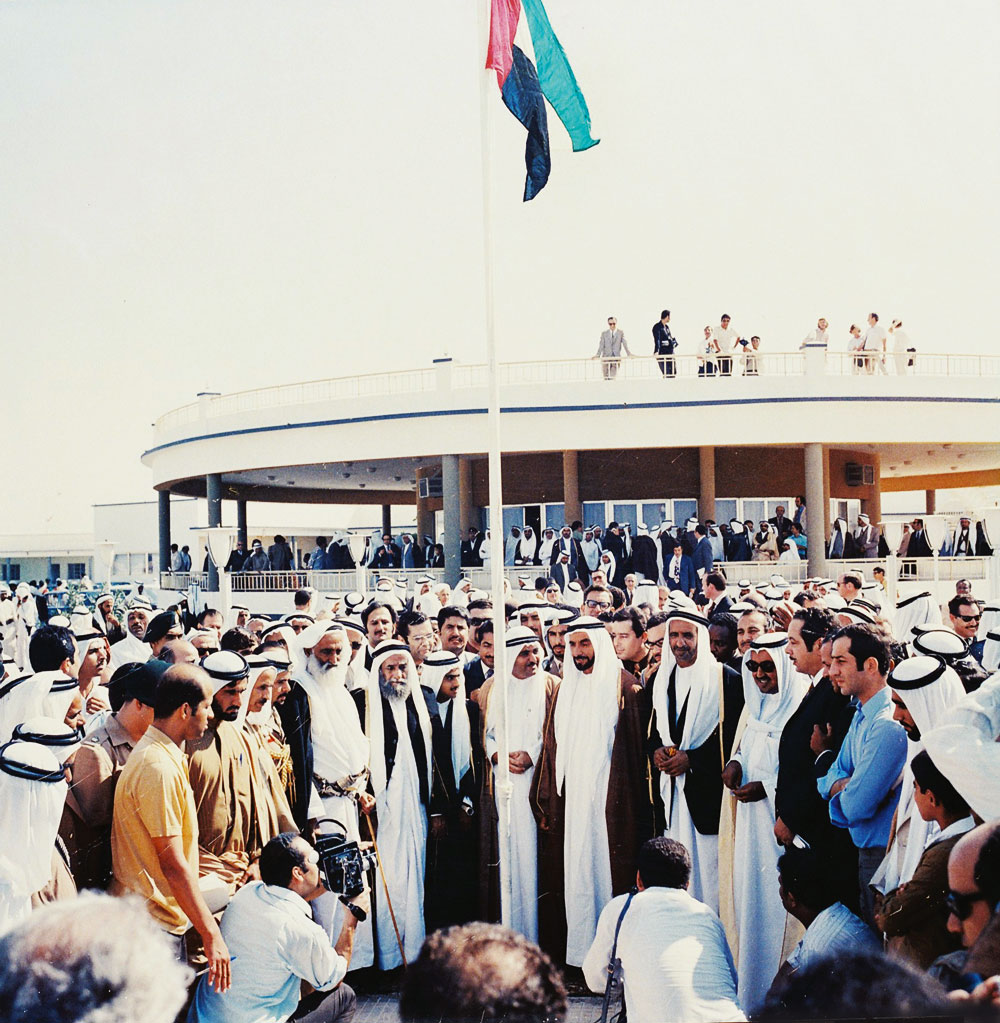
- Sheikh Zayed hoisting the flag of the United Arab Emirates at the Union House in Jumeirah, Dubai on December 2, 1971
- Native name: توحيد دولة الإمارات العربية المتحدة
- Date: February 18, 1968 – February 10, 1972 (3 years, 11 months) First phase: 18 February 1968 – 2 December 1971 Second phase: 2 December 1971 – 10 February 1972
- Location: Persian Gulf Residency; Trucial States; Bahrain; Qatar
- Participants: First phase: Federation of Arab Emirates; Trucial States; Abu Dhabi; Dubai; Ajman; Sharjah; Fujairah; Umm Al Quwain; Ras Al Khaimah; Bahrain; Qatar; Second phase: United Arab Emirates; Ras Al Khaimah
- Outcome: Union agreement between Dubai and Abu Dhabi; Creation of the Federation of Arab Emirates; Signing of the provisional constitution; Bahrain and Qatar declare independence; Dissolution of the Federation of Arab Emirates; Iranian annexation of Abu Musa and the Greater and Lesser Tunbs; Proclamation of the United Arab Emirates; Admission of United Arab Emirates to the United Nations; Disbandment of the Persian Gulf Residency; Assassination of Khalid bin Mohammed Al Qasimi; Accession of Ras Al Khaimah to the United Arab Emirates; Abu Dhabi–Saudi Arabia boundary dispute remains unresolved until 1974; Bahrain–Qatar territorial disputes remain unresolved until 2001

The Foundation of the United Arab Emirates (Arabic: تأسيس دولة الإمارات العربية المتحدة, romanized: tasis dawlat al'iimarat alearabiat almutahida) was the result of an agreement initially made between the rulers of the Trucial States of Abu Dhabi and Dubai, Sheikh Zayed bin Sultan Al Nahyan and Sheikh Rashid bin Saeed Al Maktoum in the face of the British intention, announced on 24 January 1968, to withdraw from its semi-formal protectorate over the Trucial States, and its various treaty relations with them.

Following the communication of the news of British abrogation of its treaties by Labour MP Goronwy Roberts, Zayed and Rashid met at Argoub Al Sedirah in the desert between Abu Dhabi and Dubai and agreed on the principle of Union on 18 February 1968. A subsequent meeting on 25 February with the rulers of Sharjah, Ajman, Fujairah and Umm Al Quwain would lead to a proposal to create a Federation of Arab Emirates together with Bahrain and Qatar. However, Qatar and Bahrain went on to choose independent statehood.

The founding fathers of the United Arab Emirates were: Zayed bin Sultan Al Nahyan of Abu Dhabi; Rashid bin Saeed Al Maktoum of Dubai; Khalid bin Muhammad Al Qasimi of Sharjah; Rashid bin Humaid Al Nuaimi of Ajman; Ahmad bin Rashid Al Mualla of Umm Al Quwain; Saqr bin Mohammed Al Qasimi of Ras Al Khaimah and Mohammed bin Hamad Al Sharqi of Fujairah.

Although the foundation of the United Arab Emirates was proclaimed on 2 December 1971, Ras Al Khaimah did not actually join the Union until February 1972.

== Historical background ==
Following the expulsion of the Portuguese from Bahrain in 1602, the Al Qasimi, the tribes extending from the Qatari Peninsula to the Ras Musandam, adopted maritime raiding as a way of life due to the lack of any maritime authority in the area. The attacks surged in the beginning of 19th century.

In the aftermath of a series of attacks in 1808 off the coast Sindh involving 50 Qasimi raiders and following the 1809 monsoon season, the British East India Company, with the naval support of the British government, launched an operation against the Al Qasimi tribe ruling Ras Al Khaimah in 1809. An agreement was reached between the Al Qasimi and the British with regards to maritime security, however, the agreement broke down in 1815. In 1815, the crew of a British Indian vessel were captured by Qawasim near Muscat and most of the crew were murdered. Then, on 6 January Al Qasimi captured an armed pattamar, the Deriah Dowlut, off the coast of Dwarka and murdered 17 of its 38 Indian crew. In the Red Sea, in 1816, three British-flagged Indian merchant vessels from Surat were taken and most of the crews killed.

As piracy resumed, the British returned in 1819 with a punitive expedition against the maritime force of Al Qasimi, which was now split into two emirates, one the Wahhabi-backed Ras Al Khaimah and other in Sharjah and Lengeh. The British devastated Ras Al Khaimah and ended up deposing Hassan bin Rahma Al Qasimi from power before signing the General Maritime Treaty of 1820 with the rulers of Abu Dhabi, Sharjah, Ajman, Umm Al Quwain, Ras Al Khaimah. In 1853, the treaty of Perpetual Maritime Truce was signed which prohibited any act of aggression at sea and was signed by Abdulla bin Rashid Al Mualla of Umm Al Quwain; Humaid bin Rashid Al Nuaimi of Ajman; Saeed bin Butti of Dubai; Saeed bin Tahnun Al Nahyan and Sultan bin Saqr Al Qasimi.

In response to the ambitions of France and Russia, Britain and the Trucial Sheikhdoms established closer bonds in an 1892 treaty, sheikhs agreed not to dispose of any territory except to Britain and not to enter into relationships with any other foreign government without Britain's consent. In return, the British promised to protect the Trucial Coast from all aggression by sea and to help in case of land attack.

=== Trucial States Council and the idea of federation ===
The Trucial States Council was a forum for the leaders of the emirates to meet, presided over by the British Political Agent. The first meetings took place in 1952, one in spring and one in autumn, and this set a pattern for meetings in future years. The council was purely consultative and had no written constitution and no policy making powers, it provided more than anything a forum for the rulers to exchange views and agree on common approaches. The British managed to provoke considerable irritation amongst the rulers, especially Sharjah and Ras Al Khaimah, when the ruler of Fujairah, recognised as a Trucial State by Britain on 21 March 1952, attended his first Trucial States Council.

The idea of a federation between the Trucial States was first floated in the late 1950s by Michael Wright, the British ambassador to Iraq. However, it was rejected as 'fanciful' by Bernard Burrows, the political resident.

Although the British had allocated a Trucial States Development Budget, it did little to bolster the limited funds available to the Trucial Rulers. Abu Dhabi would not strike oil until 1956 and although Dubai had revenues from its considerable mercantile activity, other rulers had little more than the income from oil exploration concessions. By 1958, committees were set up to advise on public health, agriculture and education, but the council had no independent funding, when the chairmanship moved from the Political Agent to one of the rulers, the first chairman being Shaikh Saqr bin Mohammed Al Qasimi of Ras Al Khaimah. One issue which came up regularly in the council's first 14 meetings was that of locusts—the swarms were highly destructive to the agriculture of the whole area—but the Bedouin of the interior were convinced the spraying of insecticide would be detrimental to their herds and resisted the teams brought in from Pakistan to spray the insects' breeding grounds.

An approach made by the Arab League with the offer to establish a $5 million development fund was well received by the rulers, particularly Saqr bin Sultan Al Qasimi of Sharjah who was an ardent Nasserite. Saqr bin Sultan supported the opening of an Arab League office in Sharjah, an action in which he was joined by Saqr bin Mohammed Al Qasimi, the ruler of Ras Al Khaimah.

A wave of demonstrations broke out in the streets of the Trucial States, with anti-British sentiment growing. Having long maintained 'British prestige' on the Trucial Coast, British administrators were alarmed at the strength of sentiment and at its source - the Nasserite movement and its Soviet backers. British officials petitioned the Trucial rulers to turn down the Arab League offer, citing previous treaties whereby the Trucial Rulers had undertaken not to countenance dealing with any foreign government than the British. In the face of this campaign, Saqr was obstinate, even when British officials threatened to close his airspace and shut down Sharjah's power station.

The British increased their own funding to the Trucial States Development Fund until it stood at £2.5 million and, in 1965, engineered the removal of Saqr bin Sultan. The grant to the Development Fund was made to the Council to administer as it saw fit under its first local chairman, Sheikh Saqr bin Mohammed Al Qasimi of Ras Al Khaimah. A full-time secretariat was also appointed.

In 1967, oil was discovered in the Zararah oil field in south of Liwa Oasis and King Faisal had again claimed the area as part of Saudi Arabia in 1970. Faisal offered to resolve the dispute by relinquishing claims on Al Ain and Buraimi in exchange for assuming total control over Zararah and Khor Al Adaid. He also requested Zayed to halt the drilling by the Abu Dhabi Petroleum Company in Zararah while discussions are underway.

Zayed, however, tried to resist the Saudi pressure as the oasis had been the center of the emirate's eastern province and its capital, Al Ain. For Faisal, it was an issue of pride and honor and a reminder of past Najdi Wahhabi glories under First and Second Saudi states during 18th and 19th centuries.

=== Announcement of British withdrawal and Federation of Arab Emirates ===
Harold Wilson's announcement, in January 1968, in the aftermath of the sudden devaluation of sterling, that all British troops were to be withdrawn from "east of Suez", signalled the end of Britain taking care of foreign policy and defence, as well as arbitrating between the rulers of the Trucial States. The message regarding the decision to withdraw British forces and administrative personnel from the Trucial States was delivered to the rulers of the Trucial States by Labour politician Goronwy Roberts between 8 and 11 January 1968. Roberts had previously provided reassurance to the rulers regarding Britain's intentions to remain in the area. Both Zayed and Rashid travelled to London to ask the British to reconsider or to at least accept British forces remaining if their cost were subsidised. British Defence Secretary refused the request, telling the BBC TV programme Panorama that he disliked the idea of being ‘a sort of white slaver for Arab sheikhs’, a comment for which he was later forced to apologise.

On 18 February 1968, Zayed and Rashid met at the desert location of Argoub Al Sedirah, inland of Semeih on the border between Dubai and Abu Dhabi. The two men settled a number of issues, including the definition of the border between their two Sheikhdoms and finally shook hands on the idea of a Federation or Union between them, to which they would invite other Trucial Rulers. They agreed Zayed would be president. A subsequent meeting took place on 25 February 1968 with the rulers of the other five Trucial States and on 27 February 1968 the intention to found a ‘Federation of the Arab Emirates’ was announced to media. Bahrain and Qatar were invited to join the Federation and commenced negotiations but took very different approaches to the Trucial Rulers, who had been used to working together on the Trucial States Council: Bahrain held out for representation on the basis of population (it was, at the time, the most populous of the potential members of the Federation), while Qatar proposed that the smaller Northern Trucial States be amalgamated into a single political entity, the 'United Coastal Emirates' in order to create a five-member Federation of Bahrain, Qatar, Abu Dhabi, Dubai and the UCE.

The Supreme Council meeting planned for 30 March 1968 was cancelled and while subsequent meetings went ahead and a number of committees were formed, the meetings were frequently stormy and threw up wildly divergent proposals.

In October 1969, the rulers of the nine emirates met for the last time in Abu Dhabi and elected Sheikh Zayed bin Sultan al-Nahyan as the president, Sheikh Rashid bin Saeed al-Maktoum as vice president and Sheikh Khalifa bin Hamad Al Thani as the prime minister of a thirteen-member committee of the proposed federation besides the future of the capital located somewhere between Abu Dhabi and Dubai. However, as the leaders were preparing the final communiqué, then British Political Agent Charles Treadwell requested to address the gathering and expressed his government's aspirations that all of their disagreements shall be resolved and is in Britain's interest in the successful outcome of the session. The representatives of Qatar and Ras Al Khaimah took Treadwell's remarks as unwarranted, prompting a walk-out by Sheikh Ahmad Al Thani and Sheikh Saqr Al Qasimi.

The nine-state union was never to recover from the October 1969 meeting as Bahrain and Qatar opted to drop out of further talks despite efforts by British prime minister Harold Wilson, Saudi Arabia's King Faisal bin Abdulaziz and the emir of Kuwait Sabah al-Sabah to resuscitate the negotiations.

In 1970, the United Nations conducted a survey in Bahrain in order to know whether the people desired Iranian control or preferred independence. Subsequently, the United Nations Security Council unanimously passed Resolution 278 in May 1970 which stated that "the overwhelming majority of the people of Bahrain wish to gain recognition of their identity in a full independent and sovereign State free to decide for itself its relations with other States". Iran renounced its claim to the island in the same month.

In May 1970, King Faisal bin Abdulaziz offered to resolve the dispute with Abu Dhabi by dropping some claims on Al Ain and Al Buraimi in exchange for exercising Riyadh's sovereignty in south of Liwa Oasis and Khor al-Udaid. Zayed subsequently said that he would "not reject the proposal out of hand".

Considerable unrest was felt in the region and, on 17 July 1970, a bomb was placed in the Sharjah Ruler’s majlis. It detonated prematurely and failed to harm its target, Sheikh Khalid bin Muhammad Al Qasimi.

In July 1971, the six emirates, namely Dubai, Sharjah, Ajman, Fujairah and Umm Al Quwain agreed upon forming a union by signing a provisional constitution in Dubai. Bahrain declared independence in August 1971 and Qatar followed suit in September 1971. In late November 1971, shortly after the withdrawal of British forces from the islands of Abu Musa and the Greater and Lesser Tunbs, the Imperial Iranian Navy invaded and annexed the islands, claiming both to be the part of Hormozgan Province. The annexation was met with widespread condemnation and rioting throughout the Arab world.

The day following the Iranian annexation, Sheikh Saqr bin Muhammad Al Qasimi - who had initially welcomed Iranian forces as part of an agreement to jointly administer Abu Musa - was shot and wounded by a gunman.

== Declaration of independence and aftermath ==
The union and independence of the United Arab Emirates was formally proclaimed by Sheikh Zayed Al Nahyan and was read out by Ahmed bin Khalifa Al Suwaidi on December 2, 1971, at 10:00 am at Union House (now Etihad Museum) in Jumeirah, Dubai, a day after the termination of the special treaty relations and the official expiration of the British deadline to withdraw from the Persian Gulf. The United Arab Emirates was founded by the signing of a provisional constitution by the rulers of Abu Dhabi, Dubai, Sharjah, Ajman, Umm Al Quwain and Fujairah.

The crowd gathered at Union House was so packed that following the signing, the rulers had to leave through a window. In the words of British Political Agent Julian Walker, “The treaty was signed amid a scene of confusion remarkable even by Arab standards. Photographers and pressmen were standing on the table and it was a little short of a miracle that nobody was injured and the documents were retrieved intact.”

A bilateral treaty was signed between the United Kingdom and the newly-formed United Arab Emirates on December 2, 1971, that guaranteed ten years of friendship and cooperation between the two states. The agreement was signed a day after the termination of the special treaty relations and a series of earlier protection treaties that were concluded between the British government and various leaders of Trucial States since 1820.

Although its ruler was present as an honoured guest at the celebration of the Union, Ras Al Khaimah was not initially a signatory to the Union treaty, Sheikh Saqr being dissatisfied with Ras Al Khaimah being given 6 seats in the parliamentary assembly, whereas Abu Dhabi and Dubai had 8 seats besides the power of joint veto. However, following the Iranian annexation of the islands of Greater and Lesser Tunbs and Abu Musa and the assassination of Sheikh Khalid bin Muhammad of Sharjah in January 1972, he decided to accede on February 10, 1972.

=== Recognition ===
The United Arab Emirates was recognised first by Jordan, on 2 December 1971, followed by the Arab League on 6 December and the United Nations on 9 December. The British paramilitary force, the Trucial Oman Scouts was formally handed over to the UAE's Minister of Defence, Sheikh Mohammed bin Rashid Al Maktoum, on 22 December 1971, becoming the Union Defence Force.
