= Charles J. Treadwell =

British career diplomat (1920–2010)

Sir Charles James Treadwell CMG CVO
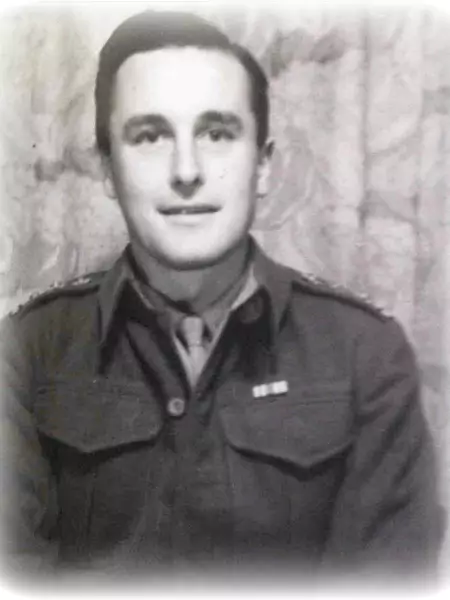
- James Treadwell as an army officer in the 1940s during World War II

British ambassador to Oman
- In office February 1975 – April 1979
- Prime Minister: Harold Wilson
- Preceded by: Donald Hawley
- Succeeded by: Ivor Lucas

British High Commissioner to the Bahamas
- In office July 1973 – February 1975
- Prime Minister: Edward Heath; Harold Wilson
- Preceded by: Office established
- Succeeded by: Peter Mennell

British ambassador to the United Arab Emirates
- In office 6 December 1971 – June 1973
- Prime Minister: Edward Heath
- Preceded by: Office established; Himself as the British Political Agent in Abu Dhabi
- Succeeded by: Donal McCarthy

Political Agent of the United Kingdom to the Trucial States in Abu Dhabi
- In office 2 May 1968 – 2 December 1971
- Prime Minister: Harold Wilson; Edward Heath
- Preceded by: Edward F. Henderson
- Succeeded by: Office abolished; Himself as the British ambassador to the United Arab Emirates

Personal details
- Born: 10 February 1920 Wellington, New Zealand
- Died: 10 January 2010 (aged 89) Chichester, England
- Spouse: Philippa Perkins Treadwell (m. 1946)
- Relations: Charles Archibald Lawrance Treadwell (father); Irene Gwendoline Treadwell (mother)
- Education: Kilbirnie Primary School; Wellesley College; Rongotai College
- Alma mater: Wellington College; Victoria University of Wellington
- Occupation: Diplomat; lawyer; judge

Military service
- Allegiance: New Zealand
- Branch/service: New Zealand Army
- Years of service: 1939–1945
- Rank: Trooper
- Unit: Second New Zealand Expeditionary Force
- Battles/wars: World War II; Mediterranean and Middle East theatre

Sir Charles "Jim" James Treadwell CMG CVO (Arabic: تشارلز جيم جيمس تريدويل;10 February 1920 – 10 January 2010), also known by his initials C. J. Treadwell, was a British-New Zealand military officer, career diplomat and lawyer who served as the last British representative to the Trucial States in Abu Dhabi from 1968 to 1971 and later the first British ambassador to the United Arab Emirates from 1971 to 1973 as well as the first British ambassador to the Bahamas between 1973 and 1975. He was one of the key advisors to Sheikh Zayed and worked closely with him during much of the unification of the United Arab Emirates. His uninviting remarks while addressing the leaders of the Persian Gulf sheikhdoms in October 1969 contributed to the eventual fall of the Federation of Arab Emirates.

In his diplomatic career spanning almost 35 years, he served in various positions at places like Sudan, Pakistan, Turkey, Saudi Arabia, Nigeria, the Bahamas and Oman. A graduate of Wellington College and the Victoria University of Wellington, he served in Second New Zealand Expeditionary Force (2NZEF) in the Middle East theatre of World War II from 1939 until the end of the war in 1945 before embarking on his career in the British Foreign Office.

== Early life and education ==
James Treadwell was born on 10 February 1920, to barrister, solicitor and soldier Charles Archibald Lawrance Treadwell and Irene Gwendoline Treadwell in Wellington, New Zealand. He received his primary education from Kilbirnie Primary School and Wellesley College whereas secondary education from Rongotai College. He further attended Wellington College and Victoria University of Wellington from where he pursued L.L.B.

=== Military career ===
When Britain declared war on Axis powers in the aftermath of the German invasion of Poland in 1939, thus sparking World War II, he was enlisted in the Second New Zealand Expeditionary Force (2NZEF) in the New Zealand Army from Trentham in Upper Hutt. He served in Palestine, Libya and Egypt up until the end of the war in 1945.

== Diplomatic career ==
Following his retirement from the army in 1945, he was posted in the Sudan Political Service until 1950 where he received assignments in the Blue Nile and Equatoria. He then went on to serve in the Sudan Judiciary as a province judge Kassala circuit between 1950 and 1955. He was then appointed in the Foreign Office in November 1955. In May 1957, he was posted as the First Secretary in Commonwealth Relations Office in Lahore, Pakistan. He was later as an appointed as the First Secretary at the British Embassy in Ankara, Turkey in September 1960. He was transferred to the British consulate in Jeddah, Saudi Arabia in 1963 and was later upgraded as the chargé d'affaires, a position he held until 1964. He was the British Deputy High Commissioner for Eastern Nigeria in Enugu from 1965 to 1966. He became the Head of Joint Information Services Department in the Foreign Office in 1966 and served until 1968.

=== Trucial States and formation of the United Arab Emirates ===
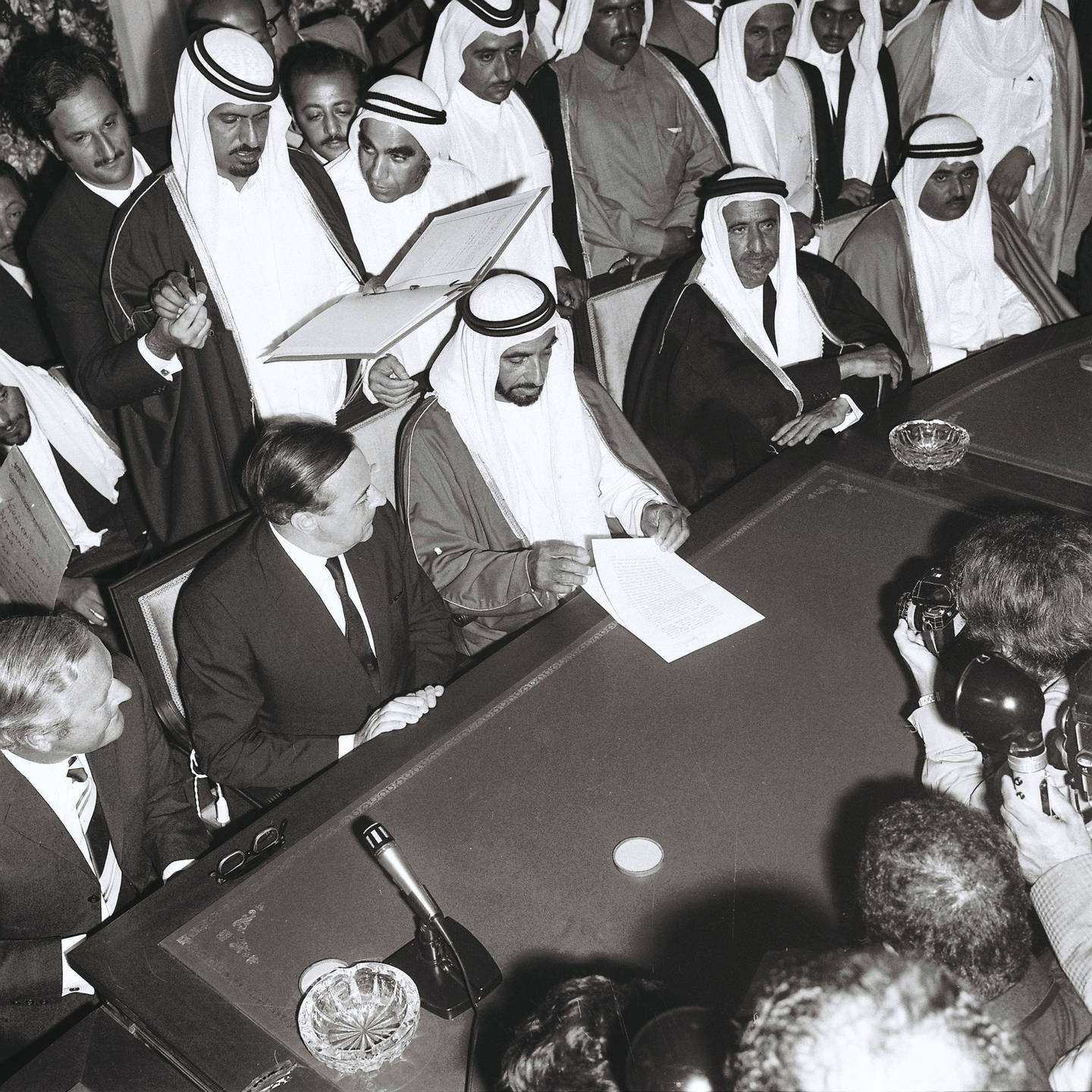
Treadwell (extreme left), seated next to Sir Geoffrey Arthur and Sheikh Zayed at the Union House in Dubai on 2 December 1971

The British government under prime minister Harold Wilson in January 1968 had publicly announced his administration's will to withdraw the country's political and military presence from its colonial and suzerain protectorates in the Persian Gulf by the end of 1971, including the Trucial States. This announcement came as a surprise for the rulers of the Gulf, especially of Trucial States, Bahrain and Qatar. His policy was carried forward by his successor, Edward Heath. A month later in February 1968, Sheikh Zayed al-Nahyan met with Sheikh Rashid bin Saeed al-Maktoum and signed a union agreement between Abu Dhabi and Dubai, a turning point in the history of the Gulf considered as the prelude to the unification of the United Arab Emirates since the two agreed on bringing other neighboring emirates to join the proposed federation, including Bahrain and Qatar.

Treadwell was appointed as Britain's political agent in Abu Dhabi in May 1968, replacing the outgoing acting representative E. F. Henderson. He became one of they key advisors to Sheikh Zayed and played an instrumental role in the formation of the United Arab Emirates.

In October 1969, the rulers of the nine emirates met in Abu Dhabi and elected Sheikh Zayed bin Sultan al-Nahyan as the president, Sheikh Rashid bin Saeed al-Maktoum as vice president and Sheikh Khalifa bin Hamad al-Thani as the prime minister of a thirteen-member committee of the proposed federation besides the future of the capital located somewhere between Abu Dhabi and Dubai.

However, as the leaders were preparing the final communiqué, Treadwell requested to address the gathering and expressed his government's aspirations that all of their disagreements shall be resolved and is in Britain's interest in the successful outcome of the session. The representatives of Qatar and Ras al-Khaimah took Treadwell's remarks as unwarranted, prompting a walk-out by Sheikh Ahmad al-Thani and Sheikh Saqr al-Qasimi, thus, withdrawing from the union over the perception of foreign interference in the Gulf's internal affairs.

My government will be extremely disappointed if these difficulties are not to be overcome. I strongly urge all the rulers to do their utmost to find a way of resolving their difficulties.

— Treadwell to the attending sheikhs, 1969

The incident proved to the final nail in the coffin and the proposed federation was consequently disbanded despite efforts by British prime minister Harold Wilson, Saudi Arabia's King Faisal and the emir of Kuwait Sabah al-Sabah to resuscitate the negotiations and by April 1971, Treadwell wrote to Sir Geoffrey Arthur, Political Resident that "there is a little hope for a union of nine". Nearly four months later in July 1971, the rest of the six emirates, namely Dubai, Sharjah, Ajman, Fujairah and Umm al-Quwain agreed upon forming a union by signing a provisional constitution. Subsequently, Bahrain became independent in August 1971 and Qatar followed suit in September 1971.

Treadwell also closely followed a series of negotiations between Sheikh Zayed and Saudi officials over Riyadh's territorial claims on some of Abu Dhabi's lands. Saudi Arabia had pressed claims on some of the areas close to the Emirate of Abu Dhabi and the Buraimi oasis since 1930s and 1950s respectively. King Abdulaziz had proclaimed the south of Liwa Oasis comes under the Saudi jurisdiction in 1935 and denied that it was a successor state to the Ottoman Empire and thus, not bound by the 1913 Anglo-Ottoman Convention. The British imposed the 'Riyadh line' in 1937 and by 1949, he also claimed the oil-rich Buraimi oasis and from 1952 to 1955, sent troops in an attempt to invade the oasis to buy the loyalties of the tribes who inhabited the area. The attempt, however, fired back when Abu Dhabi, backed militarily by the British Empire and the Oman, regained control of the oasis and drove out the Saudi guards.

In 1967, oil was discovered in the Zararah oil field in south of Liwa Oasis and King Faisal had again claimed the area as part of Saudi Arabia in 1970. Faisal offered to resolve the dispute by relinquishing claims on Al Ain and Buraimi in exchange for assuming total control over Zararah and Khor Al Adaid. He also requested Zayed to halt the drilling by the Abu Dhabi Petroleum Company in Zararah while discussions are underway.

Zayed, however, tried to resist the Saudi pressure as the oasis had been the center of the emirate's eastern province and its capital, Al Ain. For Faisal, it was an issue of pride and honor and a reminder of past Najdi Wahhabi expansionist glories under First and Second Saudi states during 18th and 19th centuries.

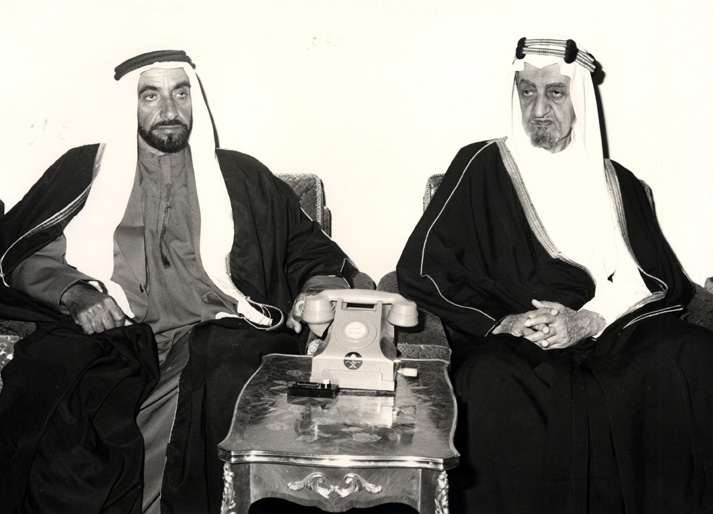
Sheikh Zayed with King Faisal in Jeddah, 1974

Treadwell informed the Foreign Office that Zayed's family's wishes and the general public opinion besides the ‘hawks’ in his government might also be the important driving factors that is refraining him from making huge concessions to the Saudis. He also informed that that Sheikh Zayed "tried, though rather half-heartedly, to blame the British for his present predicament, claiming that we ought not to have confronted him with the decision to withdraw our troops while the Saudi claim was unresolved."

He later went further in his assessment by claiming that if Sheikh Zayed accommodated Saudi Arabia, he might be assassinated by the ‘hawks’ within the royal family in Abu Dhabi, just like Sheikh Khalid al-Qasimi, emir of Sharjah, who was assassinated in January 1972 after he agreed to cede half of the island of Abu Musa to the Iranians two months before.

Despite persistent efforts by Britain, the two leaders failed to reach an agreement before the British withdrawal. In October 1971, the British representative in Jeddah had told King Faisal that the United Kingdom had done their best toward resolving the issue and now left it for Riyadh and Abu Dhabi to decide the fate of the disputed areas. In November 1971, Treadwell wrote to the Bahrain Residency in Manama,

I am content that Zayid should be left to go on stringing King Faisal along as he judges best on the clear understanding that he is now on his own but I am opposed to causing further damage to our interests by saying anything to King Faisal bluntly on the subject.

Less than a week before the British withdrawal, the Iranian Army, supported by the navy, launched an invasion of Abu Musa and the Greater and Lesser Tunbs, the two islands belonging the Emirate of Sharjah and the Emirate of Ras al-Khaimah respectively.

=== Proclamation ===
On 2 December 1971, Sheikh Zayed and the rulers of five emirates gathered at Sheikh Rashid's Al-Diyafah Palace in Jumeirah, Dubai to officially announce the establishment of the United Arab Emirates. Treadwell was one of the few British diplomats who was present during the proclamation ceremony, besides Geoffrey Arthur and Julian Walker. He also accompanied Sir Geoffrey Arthur on the same day during the signing of the friendship treaty between the United Kingdom and the United Arab Emirates.

=== British ambassador to the United Arab Emirates ===
On 6 December 1971, almost four days after the proclamation, Treadwell was appointed as the inaugural British ambassador to the United Arab Emirates. Sheikh Zayed had dispatched his Rolls-Royce Phantom V to fetch the envoy from his residence. Treadwell presented his credentials to Sheikh Zayed at Al Manhal Palace in Abu Dhabi.

Treadwell played an instrumental role in handling the bilateral relations between Britain and the UAE. For example, in a June 1972 letter to Nicholas Browne, then third secretary at the British embassy in Tehran, he warned against arranging a state-visit of Sharjah's emir Khalid al-Qasimi to Iran, as it would ruin the former's relationship with Sheikh Zayed.

Although Treadwell's remarks about the nascent union wasn't quite pleasant as he described the fragility of the United Arab Emirates in 1972 as a federation of "seven disparate states" and were "controlled by ruling families whose one common characteristic is an inability to comprehend the meaning of modern political government."

He supported Abu Dhabi's purchase of British arms as UAE's defense minister had cautioned him in January 1973 that if the United Kingdom doesn't sell them weapons, his country would turn to the French for assistance. In June 1973, Treadwell stepped down from his position as the ambassador.

=== Envoy to the Bahamas and Oman ===
Treadwell was transferred to the Bahamas in July 1973 where he served as Britain's high commissioner until 1975. He was later appointed as British ambassador to Oman and served until 1979 and retired from diplomatic life following the conclusion of Queen Elizabeth's visit to Muscat.

== Retirement and later life ==
Treadwell retired in April 1979 following the end of his tenure in Oman. He later served as a Middle East adviser to British merchant bank Hill Samuel and Hill Samuel Investment Management as well as Abu Dhabi Investment Authority.

=== 2004 Oliver Miles email controversy ===
In April 2004, Oliver Miles, the former British ambassador to Libya, wrote a letter to Prime Minister Tony Blair which was signed by 52 retired diplomats, including Treadwell that called for the British government to review its foreign policy towards the Middle East, especially Iraq and Palestine. Oliver sent the letter through an email from an internet café in Tripoli, Libya. The signatories, who consisted mainly of envoys who served in the Middle East, described the British and American policy on Iraq and the Israeli-Palestinian conflict as "doomed" and questioned Blair's support for the Bush administration over the war on terror. The incident caused severe backlash from several media outlets.

== Personal life and death ==
Due to his stay in Abu Dhabi between 1968 and 1973, he had personally known several rulers and emirs of the different emirates and had enjoyed close relationship with Sheikh Zayed. He married Philippa Treadwell (died 2013) in 1946 and had three sons with her.

=== Death ===
Treadwell died on 10 January 2010, in Chichester, West Sussex, United Kingdom at the age of 89. Wellesley College, from where he received his elementary education, extended its condolences to his family.

== Awards and nominations ==
- Order of St Michael and St George, 1972
- Royal Victorian Order, 1979
