= Argoub Al Sedirah =

Tell or hill in the United Arab Emirates

Argoub Al Sedirah is a tell or hill on the Seih Al Sedirah (Sedirah plain) inland of the township of Semeih on the border between Dubai and Abu Dhabi in the United Arab Emirates. It is the location of the historic meeting between Sheikh Zayed bin Sultan Al Nahyan of Abu Dhabi and Sheikh Rashid bin Saeed Al Maktoum of Dubai on 18 January 1968 where the two men met to discuss and agree the foundation of the Union of the-then Trucial States to become the United Arab Emirates.

It is one of three 'union sites' in the Emirates, the others being Union House and Al Khawaneej Farm, locations which are celebrated as having played a crucial role in the foundation of the nation.

== Background ==
The Trucial States were a group of Sheikhdoms in Southeastern Arabia which had become semi-protectorates of the United Kingdom following a series of maritime conflicts leading up to the signing of the General Maritime Treaty of 1820, followed by the Perpetual Maritime Truce of 1853, until in 1892 they entered into the 1892 Exclusive Agreement with the British which effectively placed them under British protection. This was an unclear status (that of a "protected state") which fell short of a formal protectorate, but required Britain to defend the Sheikhdoms from external aggression in exchange for exclusive British rights.

During the late 19th and early 20th centuries, a number of changes occurred to the status of the Trucial States. Sheikhdoms such as Rams and Dayah (now part of Ras Al Khaimah) were signatories to the original 1820 treaty, but were not subsequently recognised by the British as Trucial States; the emirate of Fujairah was not recognised by the British as a Trucial State until 1952. Kalba, recognised as a Trucial State by the British in 1936, became subsumed by Sharjah in 1952.

The Trucial States were under effective British administration through the British Persian Gulf Residency, reporting to Bombay until Indian independence in 1949, when responsibility for the states was transferred to the Foreign and Commonwealth Office in London and the role of the British 'Native Agent' – the Residency Agent in Sharjah – was terminated and a British Political Agency was opened in Dubai in 1954.

While the idea of a federation between the Trucial States was floated in the late 1950s by Michael Wright, the British ambassador to Iraq, it was rejected as 'fanciful' by Bernard Burrows, the Political Resident in the Persian Gulf. The idea was not in fact a new one, having been considered by the former ruler of Abu Dhabi, Sheikh Zayed's grandfather, Zayed the Great, who called the first meeting of the five Trucial Rulers in September 1905 over a dispute in the Wadi Hatta.

A Trucial States Council was formed in 1952 but had no status beyond a developmental agenda based around the disbursement of the Trucial States Development Fund, a fund started by the British to offset the threat of a proposed Arab League fund and the establishment of an Arab League office in the Trucial States.

=== British withdrawal ===
Following a political crisis triggered by the 1967 devaluation of Sterling, the British Labour government under Harold Wilson decided to withdraw all British troops "east of Suez" and withdraw from its treaty commitments with the Trucial States. The message regarding that decision was delivered to the rulers of the Trucial States by Labour politician Goronwy Roberts between 8 and 11 January 1968. Roberts had previously provided reassurance to the rulers regarding Britain's intentions to remain in the area.

Having discovered oil in commercial quantities (in Abu Dhabi in 1956 and Dubai in 1967) the Trucial States were particularly vulnerable without British protection, having already seen incursions taking place from Saudi Arabia during the Buraimi Incident and a constant threat from aggressive neighbours such as Iran. The British paramilitary force, the Trucial Oman Scouts, had played a decisive role in protecting the Trucial States' borders, even though their formation was only informed to the ruler of Sharjah, where they were based.

Both Zayed and Rashid travelled independently to London to ask the British to reconsider or to at least accept British forces remaining if their cost were subsidised. British Secretary of State for Defence Dennis Healey refused the request, telling the BBC TV programme Panorama that he disliked the idea of being ‘a sort of white slaver for Arab sheikhs’, a comment for which he was later forced to apologise.

== Meeting ==
On 18 February 1968, Zayed and Rashid met in a tent pitched at Argoub Al Sedira. They were each accompanied by a small number of retainers and were served ghawa, Arabic coffee, by Rashid's son Mohammed bin Rashid Al Maktoum as they talked. Two tents were erected: one for the meeting and one for the followers and for preparing coffee and food. The meeting began late in the morning.

There were a number of outstanding issues to be settled between the two rulers, despite their personal regard for each other: Dubai and Abu Dhabi had been in a state of open warfare as recently as twenty years prior, following an incursion by Dubai in the area of Khor Ghanadah which had been thwarted by the British because the action broke the 1953 Maritime Truce. Zayed's predecessor, his brother Sheikh Shakhbut bin Sultan Al Nahyan had subsequently encouraged tribes loyal to Abu Dhabi to attack those loyal to Dubai under Rashid's father, Sheikh Saeed Al Maktoum, and following an attempted peace settlement had not paid his men, leading to a resumption of raiding on a wide front between tribes loyal to the two Sheikhdoms. Zayed had in fact attempted to mediate in that conflict but the border between the two Sheikhdoms had been disputed since.

After a long negotiation at Argoub Al Sedirah, the two rulers agreed on the border between their respective emirates and on the principle of a Union. Zayed would be president and they would invite the other Trucial States to join the Federation. The two men shook hands to seal the agreement between them.

A subsequent meeting took place on 25 February 1968 with the rulers of the other five Trucial States and on 27 February 1968 the intention to found a ‘Federation of the Arab Emirates’ was announced to media. Bahrain and Qatar were invited to join the Federation and commenced negotiations but took very different approaches to the Trucial Rulers, who had been used to working together on the Trucial States Council: Bahrain held out for representation on the basis of population (it was, at the time, the most populous of the potential members of the Federation), while Qatar proposed that the smaller Northern Trucial States be amalgamated into a single political entity, the 'United Coastal Emirates' in order to create a five-member Federation of Bahrain, Qatar, Abu Dhabi, Dubai and the UCE.

Following arduous negotiations in which Bahrain and Qatar withdrew from the proposed Federation and unilaterally declared their independence, the United Arab Emirates was founded with the signing of a preliminary constitution at Union House in Dubai on 2 December 1972. A number of key meetings between the Trucial Rulers that took place leading up to the Union were held at Sheikh Zayed's farm in Al Khawaneej in Dubai.
