= Pinu Rahman =

Bangladeshi photographer

Pinu Rahman is a Bangladeshi photographer and critic. He won a Px3 State of the World award in 2021 for his photographs depicting child labor. He also won a Best of Nation award at the 2019 World Photographic Cup. His photographs have been featured on Western news outlets such as The Guardian, The Times and Deutsche Welle. They were also exhibited at the Royal Photographic Society and the Etihad Museum.
