= Charles Treadwell =

New Zealand lawyer, soldier, author and politician

Charles Treadwell OBE OSC
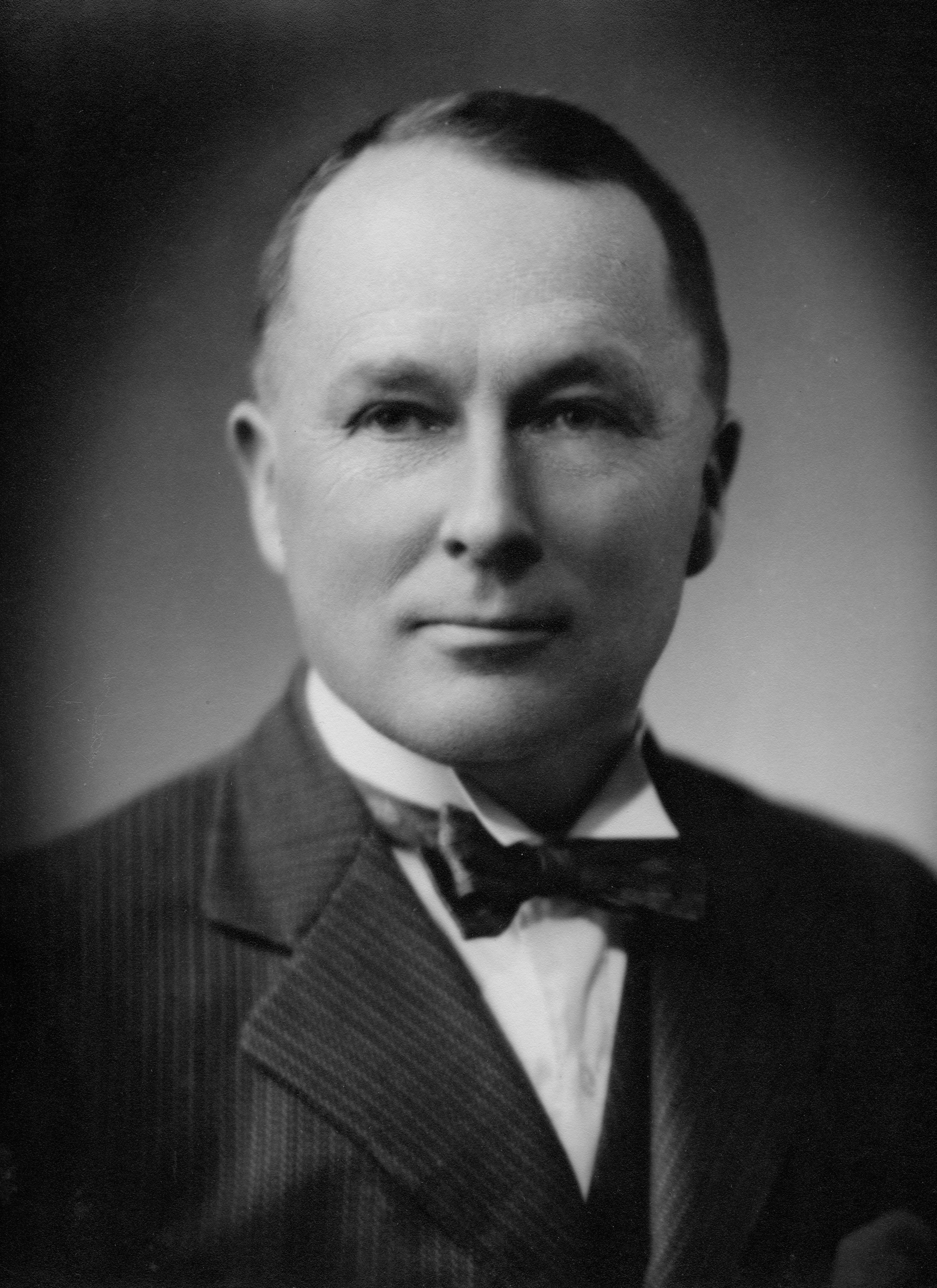

Member of the Wellington City Council
- In office 19 November 1947 – 31 October 1953
- Constituency: At-large

Personal details
- Born: Charles Archibald Lawrance Treadwell; 15 May 1889 Lower Hutt, New Zealand
- Died: 30 August 1966 (aged 77) Wellington, New Zealand
- Party: Reform
- Spouse: Irene Gwendoline Webb
- Relations: Charles J. Treadwell (son)
- Children: 4
- Education: Victoria University College
- Profession: Lawyer

Military service
- Allegiance: New Zealand Army
- Years of service: 1914–19; 1939–45
- Rank: Colonel
- Battles/wars: World War I World War II

Charles Archibald Lawrance Treadwell OBE OSC (15 May 1889 – 30 August 1966) was a New Zealand lawyer, soldier, author and politician.

== Biography ==
=== Early life ===
Treadwell was born in Lower Hutt in 1889. He was educated at Wellington College and later studied law at Victoria College. During his legal studies he worked as a clerk in a Wellington legal firm before becoming an associate to Justice William Sim in Dunedin.

=== Military career ===
During World War I he served in Egypt then in France, with the New Zealand Division. Later in 1917 he went on a three-months tour of training in England but was later admitted to hospital. He organised a wills department and general law office which he ran until his return to New Zealand in June 1919. In the 1919 Birthday Honours he was made an Officer of the Order of the British Empire, for valuable services rendered in connection with the war. In 1927 he became legal staff officer to the central command, lectured and examined military law. In the Second World War he left New Zealand with the First Echelon as Deputy-Judge Advocate General. He was promoted Lieutenant-Colonel in Egypt. On his return to New Zealand he was appointed Deputy-Judge Advocate and on the death of Colonel Claude Weston, was appointed Judge Advocate General with the rank of Colonel. He wrote several military books, and was part-author of the official history of the Wellington Regiment. He retired from the post of Judge Advocate General of the New Zealand Military Forces in 1955.

=== Diplomatic career ===
He was vice-consul for Brazil in 1932 and Consul in 1938. In February 1966 Treadwell was conferred with the Order of the Southern Cross, in the rank of chevalier, to recognise his 25 years service as consul for Brazil in New Zealand.

=== Political career ===
He stood for Parliament unsuccessfully at the 1935 general election in the Wellington North electorate for the Reform Party.

For five years he was a member of the Wellington Hospital Board from 1933 to 1938 and was also an inspector of mental hospitals. Treadwell was elected, on the Citizens' Association ticket, to the Wellington City Council at the 1947 election. Re-elected in 1950 he was defeated in 1953.

=== Later life and death ===
He was president of the Wellington District Law Society in 1951. He retired as senior partner in Wellington's oldest legal firm in May 1957. In 1959 he was commissioned by the Hutt River Board to write a history of the Hutt River and its development. Later historian David McGill referred to it as the definitive work on the subject.

Treadwell died in Wellington in 1966, aged 77.

== Works by Treadwell ==
- Treadwell, Charles Archibald Lawrance; Parry, Evan Sydney (1927). Workers' compensation in New Zealand. Auckland: Whitcombe & Tombs. OCLC 36870409.
- Cunningham, William Henry; Hanna, J.S.; Treadwell, Charles Archibald Lawrance (1928). The Wellington Regiment N.Z.E.F. 1914–1919. Feguson and Osborn Ltd. OCLC 904059539.
- Treadwell, Charles Archibald Lawrance (1936). Recollections of an amateur soldier. New Plymouth: T. Avery & Sons Ltd. OCLC 35140843.
- Treadwell, Charles Archibald Lawrance (1936). Notable New Zealand trials. New Plymouth: T. Avery & Sons Ltd. OCLC 16390860.
- New Zealand Army; Weston, Claude Horace; Treadwell, Charles Archibald Lawrance (1937). Handbook of Military Law as Applicable to the New Zealand Military Forces. G.H. Loney, Government Printer.
- Treadwell, Charles Archibald Lawrance (1954). The Wellesley Club, 1891–1953. Wellington: Whitcombe & Tombs. OCLC 154256421.
- Treadwell, Charles Archibald Lawrance (1959). The Hutt River : its history and its conquest. Lower Hutt: Hutt River Board. OCLC 43075345.
