= Al Karama, United Arab Emirates =

Proposed planned city

Coordinates: 25°15′N 55°18′E

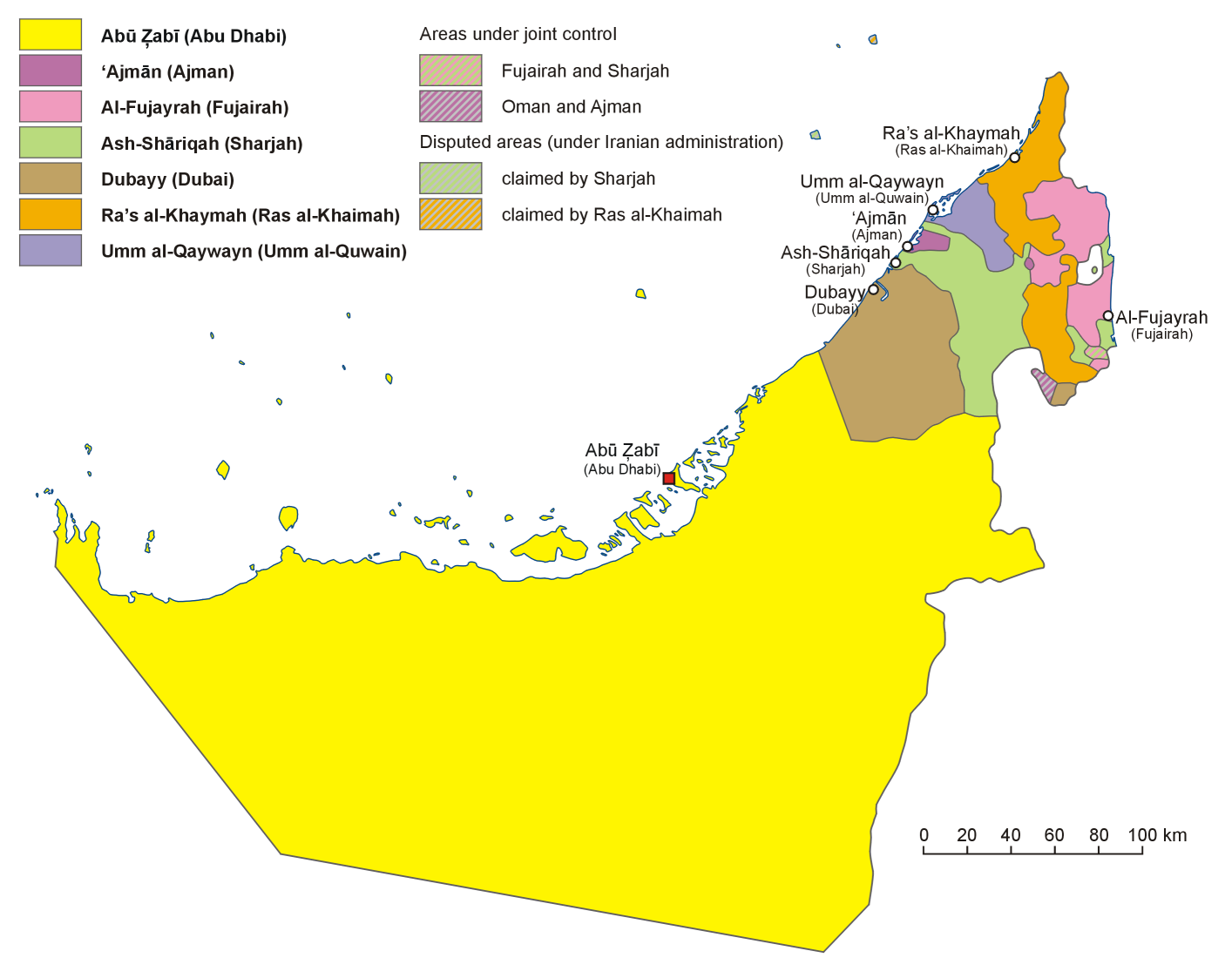
Al Karama was to be built along the border between the emirates of Abu Dhabi (yellow) and Dubai (brown). The present capital, Abu Dhabi, is in red.

Al Karama (Arabic: ٱلْكَرَامَة, romanized: Al-Karāmah) was a proposed planned city to be built on the border of the emirates of Abu Dhabi and Dubai. It was intended to be the permanent capital of the United Arab Emirates as stated in the Constitution of 1971. The proposed city was never built, and Abu Dhabi became the official capital of the UAE in 1996.

== History ==
In 1968, the United Kingdom announced that it would end its protectorate over the Trucial States (the predecessors of the UAE), leading the rulers of the States to propose a "Federation of Arab Emirates" together with nearby Bahrain and Qatar, to be led by a Supreme Council composed of their nine rulers. Negotiations were dogged by security concerns as well as issues of representation.

On October 21, 1969, the sixth and final meeting of the Supreme Council agreed that Abu Dhabi, the largest (in land area) and wealthiest of the nine, should temporarily host the capital of the new countries, with a new capital to be built between Abu Dhabi and Dubai. However, this agreement was never ratified after the meeting broke up following a clumsy British intervention. Bahrain and Qatar eventually withdrew from the proposed federation.

On July 10, 1971, the Trucial States announced the formation of the United Arab Emirates, and the capital issue resurfaced. The five small emirates counter-proposed building a new capital on the border of Dubai and Sharjah, arguing that the development funds would be better used to the benefit of the oil-poor Northern emirates but this was rejected by Dubai and Abu Dhabi. Eventually, the previous compromise was agreed upon, and Article 9 of the final constitution stated:

1. The Capital of the Union shall be established in an area allotted to the Union by the Emirates of Abu Dhabi and Dubai on the borders between them and it shall be given the name Al Karama.
2. There shall be allocated in the Union budget for the first year the amount necessary to cover the expenses of technical studies and planning for the Construction of the Capital. However, Construction work shall begin as soon as possible and shall be completed in not more than seven years from the date of entry into force of this Constitution.
3. Until the Construction of the Union Capital is complete, Abu Dhabi shall be the provisional headquarters of the Union.

The Constitution came into effect on December 2, 1971, with Abu Dhabi as the provisional capital, with a five year term. However, implementation was stalled by ongoing disputes between Abu Dhabi and Dubai, and construction of the capital-to-be never got underway. Instead, Abu Dhabi started building the institutions of government on its own territory, ignoring repeated demands from Dubai and Ras al-Khaimah to build the new capital as promised. In 1979, in light of the "facts on the ground" and lacking the resources to build it on their own, these demands were dropped.

A quarter-century after the initial constitution, the Supreme Council of the UAE passed Constitutional Amendment Nr. 1 of May 1996, which specified that "Abu Dhabi City is the Capital of the Federation." and thus finally ended any prospect of Karama being constructed as the new capital of the United Arab Emirates.

== Legacy ==
Even in the UAE, few today are aware of the planned capital. However, some references to Al Karama remain in the infrastructure of the United Arab Emirates; for example, telephone area code 01 (+971 1) remains reserved for the city.
