= Nasib al-Bitar =

Palestinian jurist

- محمد نسيب البيطار
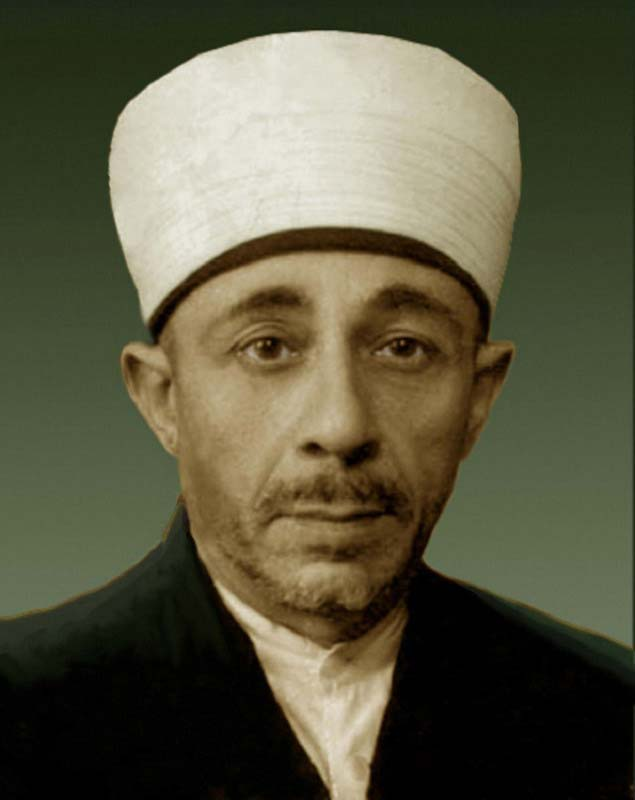
- Born: June 13, 1890; Nablus
- Died: June 26, 1948 (aged 58)
- Occupation: jurist
- Children: Adi Bitar
- Father: Sayyed Said Al Bitar Al Husseini

Judge Shaikh Nasib Al Bitar (June 13, 1890–June 26, 1948) was a Palestinian jurist, born in the city of Nablus in Palestine. He was the second son of Sayyed Said Al Bitar Al Husseini.

== Education ==
He finished his elementary education in Nablus on July 13, 1902. He completed Al Rushdieh by 1905. For his college education he started in Nablus and then went to Al Azhar University in Cairo for his university degree. He then went to Istanbul for his higher education in Islamic Law. He finished as the First World War broke out.

== Military career ==
As a new graduate he was recruited by the Ottoman Army sent to the Military Cadet School and graduated as an officer. He served gallantly for about four years moving up the ranks, thus got his share of the First World War and a medal for his honorable discharge and gallant service. He had served most of his military duty in Iraq.

== Career in the justice system ==
After the War he worked all over Palestine in Islamic Law courts, starting in Jaffa in 1921, to Jerusalem in 1923 followed by Gaza as an Islamic Judge in 1938, Nazareth and Jenin came later in 1942 together with Beisan. He then was appointed to Haifa in 1944. Finally back to Jerusalem in 1946 as the Jerusalem Islamic Judge.

=== Judicial services ===
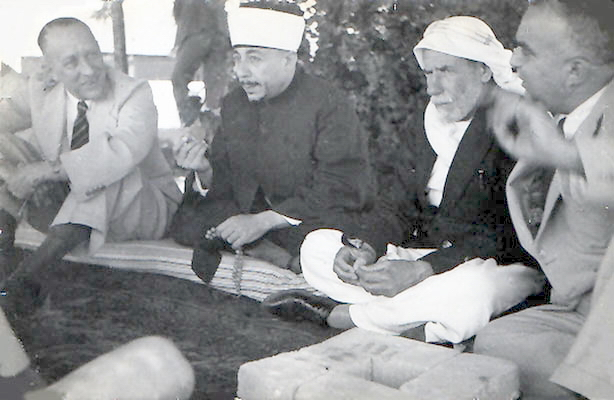
Sheik Nasib Al Bitar in Gaza - Palestine 1938, Also with him was Aref Al Aref, the Mayor of Gaza and the British PA to Palestine during the British Mandate, Edward Keith-Roach

- Jaffa Islamic Court 11 September 1921
- Jerusalem Islamic Court 27 February 1923
- Gaza Islamic Court 15 April 1938
- Nazareth and Jenin Islamic Courts 1 January 1942
- Haifa Islamic Court 1 January 1944
- Jerusalem Islamic Court 1 January 1946
- He died in Amman and was buried in Nablus 26 June 1948

== Book ==
He wrote a book about the law of inheritance in Islam, first published on 30 September 1931 under the title Al Fareedah Fi Hisab Al Fareeddah. When he died it was discovered that he was in the process of writing another book on the same topic in Turkish, unfortunately he could not finish the manuscript. In 1986 Al Nahar Daily News Paper wrote about him quoting a paragraph from Ajjaj Nuweihed's book Men from Palestine.

== Community leadership ==
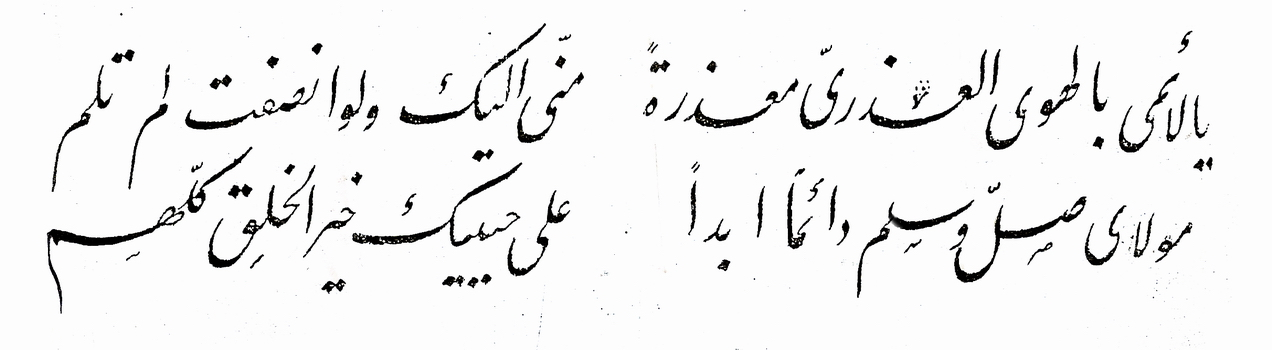
A sample of Sheikh Nasib's calligraphy skills in Al Khat Al Farisi

Whenever he went to Nablus he was always invited to lead the prayers in the main mosque as a gesture of respect. He also was an expert in Arabic calligraphy and sometimes gave lessons of "Al Khat Alarabi" at Al Rawdah School in Jerusalem next to the court-house. He was a member of al-Muntada al-Adabi المنتدى الأدبي. He wrote poetry but never published it, he only exchanged reciting it with his intellectual friends in his Majlis مجلس.

== Death ==
One day during the 1948 War and as a result of it, he felt a severe headache and felt very sick, and because of the war all hospitals in Palestine would not take him in. He had to be taken to the Italian Hospital in Amman, Jordan. There he died on June 26, 1948. He was buried in his birthplace in Nablus, Palestine.

== Life coincidences ==
One astonishing fact was the death of Sheik Nasib and his wife Bahija.

- He died in 1948, She died in 1967, they both died during war-time.
- He died on June 26, 1948; she also died on June 26, 1967. They died two wars apart.
- He died at the Italian Hospital in Amman; she also died at the same hospital.

== See also ==
- Islamic inheritance jurisprudence
