= Telephone numbers in the United Arab Emirates =

Telephone numbers in United Arab Emirates
- Country: United Arab Emirates
- Format: 0x xxx xxxx (landline); 05x xxx xxxx (mobile) xxx xxxx (special services)
- Country code: +971
- International access: 050
- Long-distance: 0

Telephone numbers in the United Arab Emirates (UAE) follow a closed telephone numbering plan. The UAE is assigned an international dialing code of +971 by ITU. Telephone numbers are fixed at seven digits, with area codes fixed at two or three digits.

== Area Codes ==
=== Before 2000 ===
Subscriber numbers were 5- or 6- digits, with area code plus subscriber number totalling 7 digits.

=== Current ===
The overall structure of the UAE's national numbering plan is:

Landline numbers begin with:

- 01 Al Karama (Canceled)
- 02 Abu Dhabi
- 03 Al Ain
- 04 Dubai
- 05 mobile number
- 06 Sharjah, Ajman and Umm al-Quwain
- 07 Ras Al Khaimah
- 08 Western Region (Liwa, etc.)
- 09 Fujairah

Mobile numbers begin with:

- 050 cell phones (Etisalat)
- 052 cell phones (Du)
- 053 cell phones (Virgin Mobile)
- 054 cell phones (Etisalat) (Recently released for public use.)
- 055 cell phones (Du)
- 056 cell phones (Etisalat)
- 057 cell phones: DOMC
- 058 cell phones (Du/Virgin Mobile) (Recently released for public use.)

== Emergency Numbers ==
The following numbers are used for emergency services within the UAE:

- 999 - Police (Emergency)
- 901 - Police (Non-emergency)
- 998 - Ambulance
- 997 - Fire Department (Civil Defence)
- 996 - Coast Guard
- 995 - Search and Rescue
- 991 - Electricity & Water failure
- 992 - Water failure

== Special numbers ==
Mobile numbers with rare or repeating digit patterns, marketed as "VIP" or "golden" numbers, are sold at a premium in the UAE, and Etisalat has auctioned such numbers in categories including gold, platinum and diamond.

These are special 7-digit number ranges, and have no associated area code):

- 200xxxx shared cost services
- 600xxxxxx shared cost services
- 800xxx(xxxx)
- (800 + min. 3 digits)
