= Adi Bitar =

Palestinian-Jordanian lawyer who wrote the constitution of the United Arab Emirates

Adi Bitar عدي البيطار
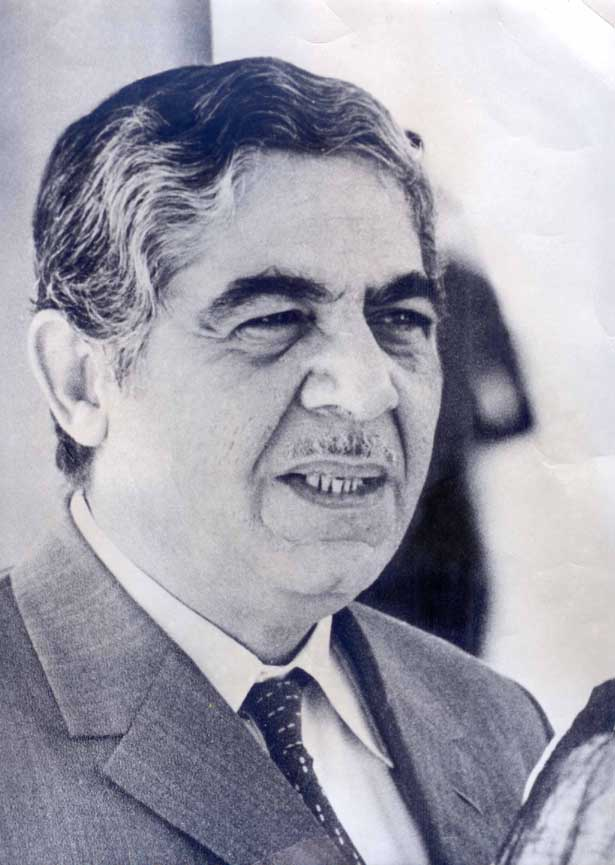
- Born: December 7, 1924; Jerusalem, Mandatory Palestine
- Died: 4 March 1973 (aged 48); Dubai, United Arab Emirates
- Father: Nasib al-Bitar

Adi Al Bitar (Arabic: عدي البيطار) (7 December 1924 – 4 March 1973) was a Palestinian-Jordanian judge, a legal advisor and lawyer who worked all over the Middle East. He was the author of the Constitution of the United Arab Emirates

== Early years ==
Adi was born in Jerusalem on December 7, 1924. His father, Sheikh Nasib Al Bitar’s continuous relocation around Palestine forced him to enroll at the Terra Sancta School in Jerusalem as a boarder. He graduated school with honors.

=== King David Hotel bombing ===
To help pay for his college fees Bitar worked as a clerk at the Chief Secretary's office in Jerusalem. The British had chosen the King David Hotel as their headquarters in a secure zone, thus requiring a pass to enter. On July 22, 1946, the King David Hotel was bombed by members of Irgun — a Zionist organization. Adi was in the building when the bomb exploded and was saved only because his elder brother Bahij; who also worked there, insisted that Adi was buried alive under the rubble. It took two hours to reach him and he was found alive with two broken arms and two broken ribs and with many bruises all over his face and body. It took several weeks for his injuries to heal.

== Jerusalem ==
He then was accepted by the Jerusalem Law Classes. These were established by the British mandate as a college of law to create a workforce of lawyers who understood the new laws that were being implemented in the region, replacing the existing Ottoman Laws. He graduated on April 26, 1948 and was registered as a lawyer on June 16, 1949.

He joined the district attorney's office in Jerusalem until his resignation August 18, 1956, to work in Sudan as a judge. During his time with the district attorney's office, Adi took part in the initial hearings of the murder of King Abdullah I of Jordan that occurred on July 20, 1951, in Jerusalem.

== Sudan ==
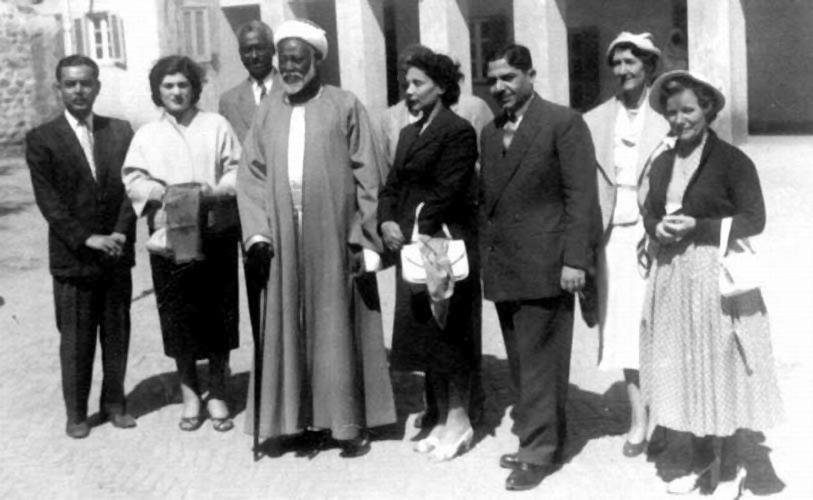
Judge Adi Bitar with his wife and Judge Daoud Abu Ghazaleh and his wife and others in Sudan with Sheikh Abdulrahman Mohamed Al Mahdi, a Sudanese religious and political Leader

In 1956, he was appointed as the Blue Nile District Judge in Sudan at Wad Medani, first as a deputy, and then with a full appointment a year later. In late 1959 he returned to Jerusalem where he established his own law firm.

== Dubai ==
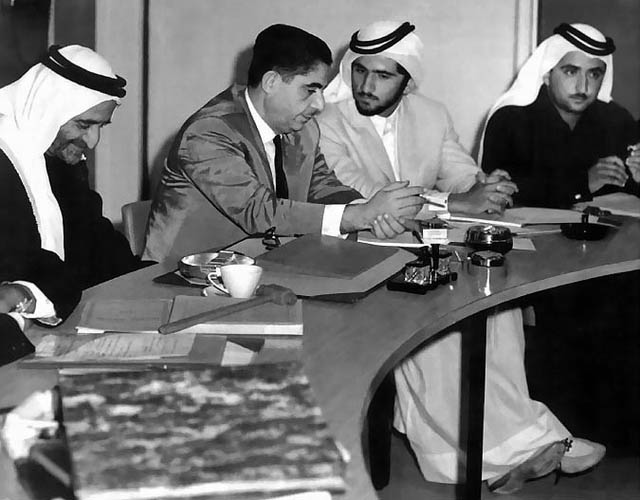
Adi Bitar with Al Maktoum rulers of Dubai in a meeting as the Legal Advisor to the Government of Dubai

In 1964 he was appointed as the Legal Advisor to the Government of Dubai. There he established the first Civil Laws and the Civil Courts and was appointed as Chief Justice. He helped establish the Dubai Chamber of Commerce and Industry and many other projects.

== The Trucial States ==
Bitar was appointed as the Secretary General to the Trucial States Council in 1967, and served until it closed in 1971 when the federation was created and the United Arab Emirates emerged as a new Arab State.

== The United Arab Emirates ==
He took a very active and strategic role in the formation of the UAE. It was decided by Sheikh Zayed Bin Sultan Al Nahyan and Sheikh Rashid bin Saeed Al Maktoum during their meeting at the "Abu Dhabi - Dubai" border point at Sumaih, now known as the "Sumaih Meeting", that Adi Bitar should write the constitution. It was approved and signed by the Rulers of six Emirates in the Dubai Guesthouse Palace on December 2, 1971, the date now celebrated as the UAE National Day. The Emirate of Ras Al Khaima joined a few months later.

=== UAE & Jordan ===
Adi helped build good relations between UAE and Jordan. He managed to create strong relations between Sheikh Rashid bin Saeed Al Maktoum and King Hussein Bin Talal of Jordan. He received two medals from the Jordanian monarch.

== Death ==
Two years after the formation of the UAE he died of colon cancer, and was buried in Dubai on March 4, 1973. Adi was buried next to his 10-year-old son Issa who had died three months earlier of leukemia.
