= George Pickering (physician) =

English medical doctor and academic

Sir George White Pickering, FRS (26 June 1904 – 3 September 1980) was an English medical doctor and academic.

== Biography ==
Pickering was Regius Professor of Medicine at the University of Oxford from 1956 to 1968, and Master of Pembroke College, Oxford, from 1968 to 1975.

He was a Governor of Abingdon School from 1969 until 1974. Pickering was the author of the book Creative Malady (1974). The book explores creativity and mental illness in the lives of Charles Darwin, Mary Baker Eddy, Sigmund Freud, Florence Nightingale, Marcel Proust and Elizabeth Barrett Browning.

== Honours ==
In the 1957 Birthday Honours, it was announced that Pickering was to be made a Knight Bachelor in recognition of his role as Regius Professor of Medicine at the University of Oxford. On 16 July 1957, he was knighted by Queen Elizabeth II at Buckingham Palace.

== Publications ==
- Creative Malady: Illness in the Lives and Minds of Charles Darwin, Mary Baker Eddy, Sigmund Freud, Florence Nightingale, Marcel Proust and Elizabeth Barrett Browning (1974)

Academic offices
Preceded by A. D. Gardner	Regius Professor of Medicine, University of Oxford; 1956 to 1968	Succeeded by Sir Richard Doll
Preceded by Ronald McCallum	Master of Pembroke College, Oxford; 1968 to 1975	Succeeded by Sir Geoffrey Arthur
