= Kuğulu Park =

Park in Çankaya, Ankara, Turkey

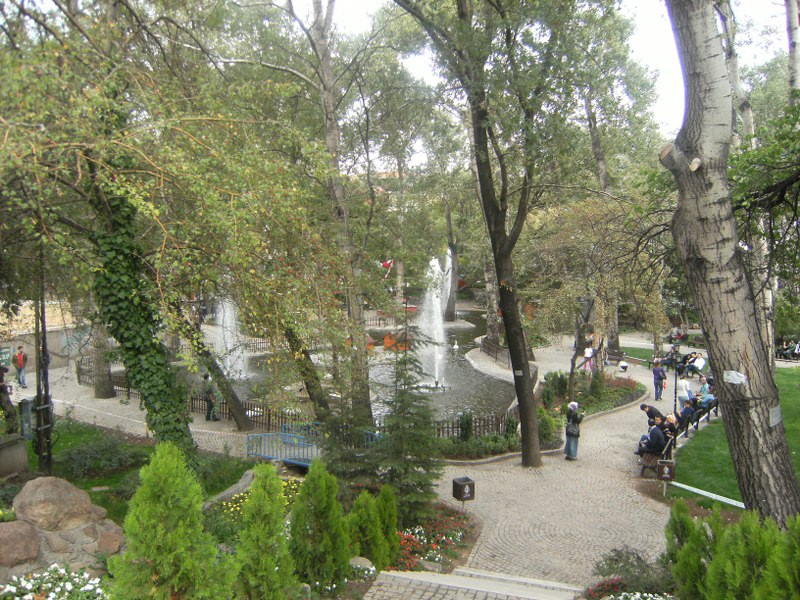
- Pond in Kuğulu Park

- Location within Turkey
- Location: Çankaya, Ankara, Turkey
- Coordinates: 39.901924°N 32.860166°E
- Area: 1 ha (2.5 acres)
- Created: 1958; 68 years ago

Kuğulu Park (Swan Park) is a 1 ha (2.5 acres) public park in a part of town(referred to as Tunalı by locals) in the Çankaya district of Ankara, Turkey. The park is known for its swans (a symbol of Ankara), but also has ducks and geese. Its pond was renovated in 2012.

In June 2013 Kuğulu's waterfowl (35 birds) were evacuated temporarily to protect them from tear gas exposure during the 2013 Turkish protests. The park was a major meeting point for protestors, and saw a Taksim Gezi Park-style encampment.

The City of Vienna gave the park a gift of swans.

== Gallery ==
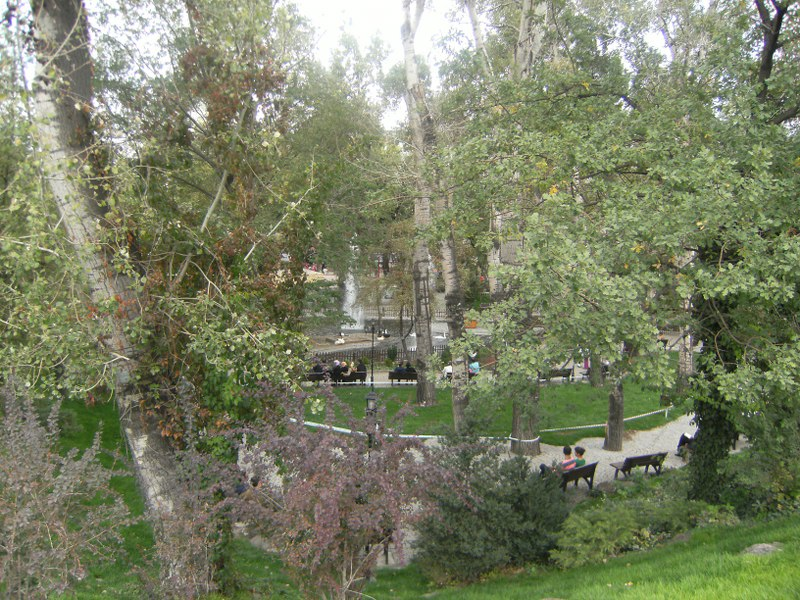

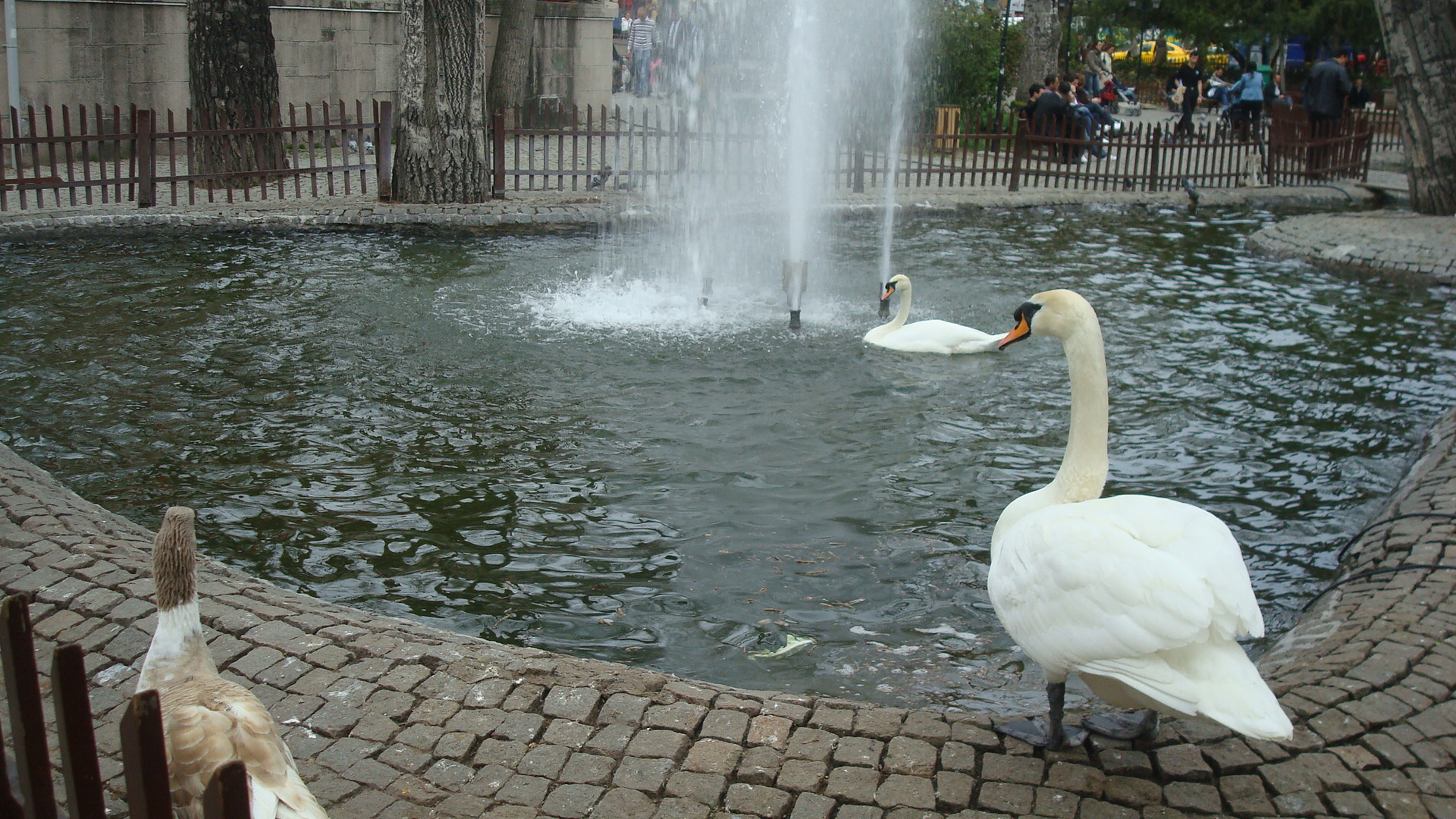

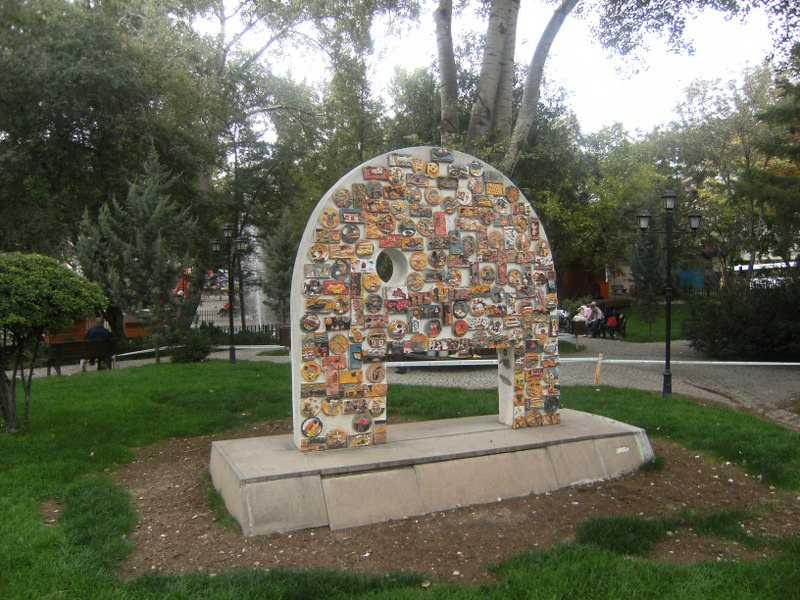

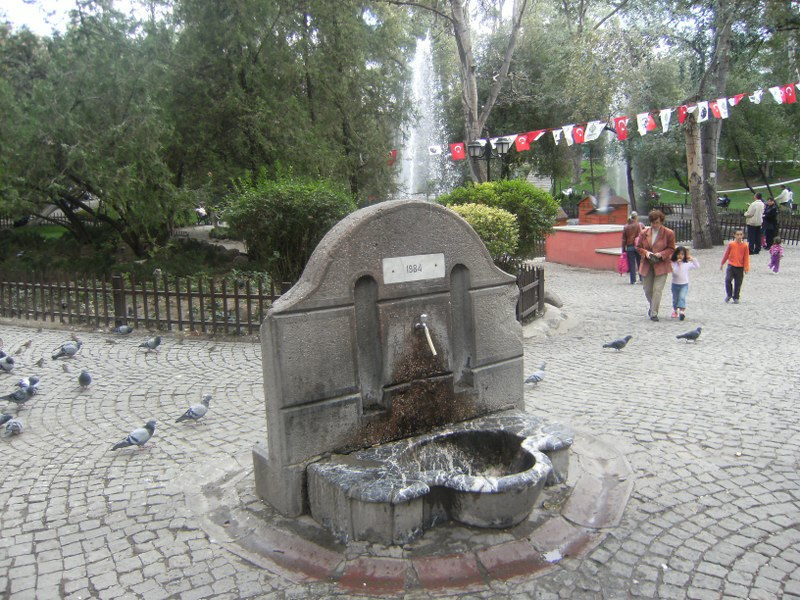

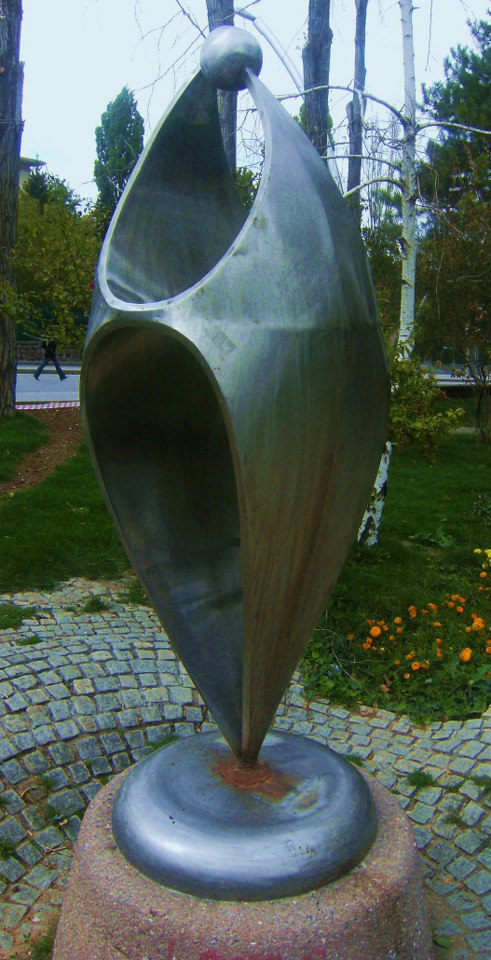

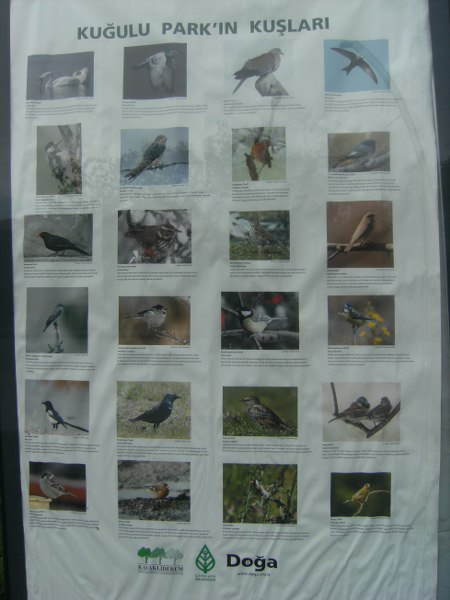
