= Geoffrey Arthur =

British diplomat and academic administrator (1920–1984)

- Arthur in 1967

Personal details
- Born: 19 March 1920
- Died: 15 May 1984 (aged 64)
- Education: Ashby School
- Alma mater: Christ Church, Oxford

Sir Geoffrey George Arthur, KCMG (19 March 1920 – 15 May 1984) was a British diplomat and academic administrator. After a career in the Foreign Office, he was Master of Pembroke College, Oxford, from 1975 until his death in 1984.

== Early life and education ==
He was educated at Ashby-de-la-Zouch Grammar School and Christ Church, Oxford. His university education was interrupted by war service. He served in Egypt, Iran and Iraq, and on returning to Oxford, transferred from studying classics to Persian and Arabic. He graduated with first class honours.

== Career ==
He joined the Foreign Office in 1947, serving in Baghdad, Ankara, Cairo and Bonn. He was Ambassador to Kuwait from 1967 to 1970. From 1970 to 1971, he was the last Political Resident in the Persian Gulf and oversaw the break up of the British territory in the Persian Gulf into the independent states of Bahrain, Qatar, and the United Arab Emirates. His final civil service appointment was as Chair of the Joint Intelligence Committee, serving between 1973 and 1975.

In 1975, he was elected Master of Pembroke College, Oxford. He was also on the governing body of Abingdon School from 1978.

== Personal life ==
In 1946, Arthur married Margaret, daughter of T. A. Woodcock (former headteacher of Ashby School). They had no children.

He died on 15 May 1984, aged 64, after a short illness. A memorial service was held at Christ Church Cathedral, Oxford.

Academic offices
Preceded by Sir George Pickering	Master of Pembroke College, Oxford; 1975–1984	Succeeded by Sir Roger Bannister
