= Bernard Burrows =

British diplomat

Burrows in 1955.

Sir Bernard Alexander Brocas Burrows, GCMG (3 July 1910 – 7 May 2002) was a British diplomat.

== Career ==
Burrows studied at Eton College and Trinity College in Oxford. In 1934, after two years spent learning languages in France, Austria and Italy, he entered the Diplomatic Service. He was posted to Cairo in 1938 where he served throughout the Second World War and where he met his future wife Ines, the daughter of John Walter, co-proprietor of The Times. They were married in 1944, and the next year he was posted back to London.

He served as the head of the Foreign Office's eastern department in 1947–1949. In this position he advocated for Transjordan's invasion of Palestine which, in his view, "would have immense strategic advantages for us, both in cutting the Jewish State … off from the Red Sea and by extending up to the Mediterranean the area in which our military and political influence is predominant". In 1950, Bernard Burrows went to British Embassy in Washington D.C. as the head of chancery, at the same time as Guy Burgess.

He became political resident in the Persian Gulf, based in Bahrain, in 1953, handling relations with Kuwait, Bahrain, Qatar and the seven Trucial States. Burrows expressed his disagreement with British foreign policy over Suez and was frustrated by the inadequate communication from his headquarters (he was never consulted by London about the regional repercussions of the operation), bringing him close to resignation.

When he was appointed British ambassador to Ankara, Turkey (1958–1962), he had never visited the country before and had little previous knowledge of it. He was surprised to find the inauguration of an oil refinery accompanied by the slaughter of a sheep. He quickly fell in love with the culture and the people there. "When we arrived in Turkey from Arabia," writes Sir Bernard in his memoirs, "it felt as if we were coming home." He was on friendly terms with several members of the Turkish government, including the prime minister Adnan Menderes. In the opinion of many good judges, he was one of the best ambassadors Britain had sent to Turkey. Queen Elizabeth II of the United Kingdom visited Ankara as the guest of the head of state Cemal Gursel during his term in the embassy. Burrows established excellent relations with President Gursel who later helped obtain permission for British military aircraft to overfly Turkey on their way to support Kuwait. When government and public opinion in Britain reacted sharply against the execution of Menderes despite his efforts for the contrary and pleas of forgiveness to the ruling military[National Unity Committee by the Queen, President John F. Kennedy, Gursel and İsmet İnönü, Sir Bernard worked hard to prevent a diplomatic rupture between the two countries. Ankara hinted to him that his personal popularity had possibly prevented a recall of ambassadors. "It was lucky that an ethical foreign policy had not yet been invented," he wrote in his autobiography.

Burrows retained a strong attachment to Turkey, supporting its closer integration into Europe and its membership of the European Union as its persuasive advocate over 40 years. Listing the delay in bringing Turkey closer into the EU as one of his main disappointments, he once wrote : "Turks have been notoriously bad at lobbying for themselves, and myths of the 'terrible Turk', whether or not realistically based, continue to be perpetuated through Byron, Lawrence of Arabia, and [the film] Midnight Express". He served as the chairman of the British Institute of Archaeology in Ankara, chairman of the Anglo-Turkish Society in London. He was immensely popular with the Turks, and when his wife died in 1997, trees were planted in the central Kuğulu Park in Ankara to honour the couple.

Following his service in London as the chairman of the Joint Intelligence Committee, the last position in his career was British ambassador to NATO and permanent representative on the NATO Council in Brussels, working on the Euro-Group and chairing the Nuclear Planning Group.

== Later life ==
Burrows retired from the government service as the number two in the Foreign Office in 1970, but still remained active as the chairman of the Federal Trust for Education and Research, local Citizens Advice Bureau, chairman of the Horticultural Society of East Dean and delivering meals-on-wheels until he was 90. He possessed intellectual curiosity, fuelled by hostility towards the church, established religion and lecturing priests. This led him to pursue a humanist approach in a quest for the causes of conflict and ways to prevent it; religion, after all, had been the source of so much bloodshed throughout history. This also led Burrows to explore the paranormal, and apparently unexplained phenomena. At the time of his death, he was working on a book, Progress, in which he proposed to question conventional views and presumptions about the development of the human condition.

In 1965, he was described in Anthony Sampson's Anatomy of Britain as "one of the five most powerful people in Whitehall".

Burrows published his memoirs in Diplomat in a Changing World (2001). He also authored The Security of Western Europe (With C Irwin 1972), Devolution or Federalism (with G Edwards 1980), The Defence of Western Europe (1982), and a history of the Gulf region, Footnotes in the Sand (1990). He also advised on the political scenario for General Sir John Hackett's bestseller, The Third World War (1982). In 2001, he published A Myth for Our Time, examining the origins of the universe from a humanist perspective.

Sir Bernard Burrows was appointed Knight Commander of St. Michael and St. George (KCMG) in 1955 and the Grand Cross (GCMG) in 1970.

He is survived by a daughter and a son.

- On Europa: Romania and Bulgaria became the newest members of the European Union on the first day of the new year. They were two Iron-Curtain countries. They had fallen under the paws of Communism! Turkey put up a great fight not to fall under Communism. She ruined, killed, her own children suspects of being Communists. During the Cold-War, she did military spending over her budget. She gave her armies to NATO. Now look at the outcome. While the old enemies of the West, former communists are rewarded by E.U. membership, doors are being closed on the face of the old-allies Turks. So, what is the lesson? To be a soldier of the West is not enough to be Western. Hope you feel better soon !

— Sir Bernard Burrows, Melih ASIK, Milliyet, January 2007
