= Shaybah oil field =

Crude oil producing site in Saudi Arabia

Shaybah Oil Field - حقل الشيبة
- Location of the Shaybah oil field within Saudi Arabia
- Country: Saudi Arabia
- Region: Rub' al Khali
- Offshore/onshore: onshore
- Coordinates: 22°36′20.8″N 54°04′08.9″E
- Operator: Saudi Aramco

Field history
- Discovery: 1998
- Start of development: 1998
- Start of production: 1998
- Peak year: 2022

Production
- Current production of oil: 1,000,000 barrels per day (~5.0×10^{7} t/a)
- Estimated oil in place: 14,000 million barrels (~1.9×10^{9} t)
- Estimated gas in place: 710×10^{9} m^{3} 25×10^{12} cu ft

Shaybah Oil Field is a large-scale oil field under the control of Saudi Arabia and is located in the northern edge of the Rub' Al-Khali/Empty Quarter desert. It is located about 10 km south of the border to Abu Dhabi, United Arab Emirates, which is a straight line drawn in the desert. It is 40 km south of the eastern part of Liwa Oasis of Abu Dhabi.

Shaybah has housing facilities for 1,000 men, administrative offices, an air-strip, a fire station, recreation areas, maintenance and support workshops, and power stations for generation and distribution. There is a 650-kilometer fibre optic cable linking Shaybah to the main radio system at Abqaiq. Shaybah's weather is extreme, with the temperature dropping to 10 degrees Celsius on winter nights, rising to around 50 degrees Celsius in the summer daytime. Dust storms are a regular occurrence.

== History ==
Shaybah was developed for the purposes of exploiting the Shaybah oilfield. It was established by Saudi Aramco during the 1990s, and, prior to this, only the rough tracks used by early exploration teams existed in this isolated desert region. All materials for the establishment and construction of Shaybah were transported the 800 kilometres from Dhahran to Shaybah by road.

When established, the Shaybah oilfield had estimated reserves of over 14 billion barrels (2.2×10^{9} m^{3}) of crude oil and 25 trillion cubic feet (710 km^{3}) of gas. Saudi Aramco brought the project on-stream in 1998. The crude is Arabian extra light, a high-quality crude grade with a specific gravity of 42 degrees api and a sulphur content of less than 0.7 percent. The oil reservoir is found at a depth of 1,494 meters and is itself 122 meters thick. The oil pipeline from the Shaybah field to Abqaiq is 638 kilometres long, while the pipelines within the field itself total 735 kilometres in length. In 2016 Aramco increased oil output from 750,000 b/d to 1 million b/d.

A drone attack by Yemen's Iran-aligned Houthi group occurred on the field on Saturday 17 August 2019 with aims at disrupting the oil supply.

== Airport ==
A small airport (Shaybah Airport) is located in Shaybah for the exclusive use of Saudi Aramco offering flights for its employees to Dammam, Jeddah, Riyadh and al-Hasa.

== See also ==
- Saudi Arabia–United Arab Emirates border dispute
