= Michael Wright (diplomat) =

British diplomat

Sir Michael Wright

Personal details
- Born: 3 December 1901
- Died: 10 June 1976 (aged 74)
- Education: Winchester College; Balliol College

Sir Michael Robert Wright, GCMG (3 December 1901 – 10 June 1976) was a British diplomat. He was the British ambassador to Norway from 1951 to 1954 and then to Iraq from 1954 to 1958. He also served in places like the United States, Egypt and France.

In July 1957, he and his wife, Ursula Long were held prisoner by Iraqi rebels at the British embassy in Baghdad.

== Biography ==
The son of the noted judge Sir Robert Samuel Wright, Michael Wright was educated at Winchester College and Balliol College, Oxford. He entered HM Diplomatic Service in 1926.
