= Constitution of the United Arab Emirates =

The Constitution of the United Arab Emirates (Note: Arabic: دستور دولة الامارات العربية المتحدة, dastūr dawlat al-imarāt al-'arabīya al-muttaḥida) provides a legal and political framework for the operation of the United Arab Emirates as a federation of seven emirates. The Constitution came into effect on 2 December 1971 and was permanently accepted in July 1996. Authored by Adi Bitar, a forming judge and legal advisor, the Constitution is written in 10 parts and has 152 Articles. The United Arab Emirates celebrates the formation of the Union (and acceptance of the federal constitution) as National Day on 2 December.

== History ==
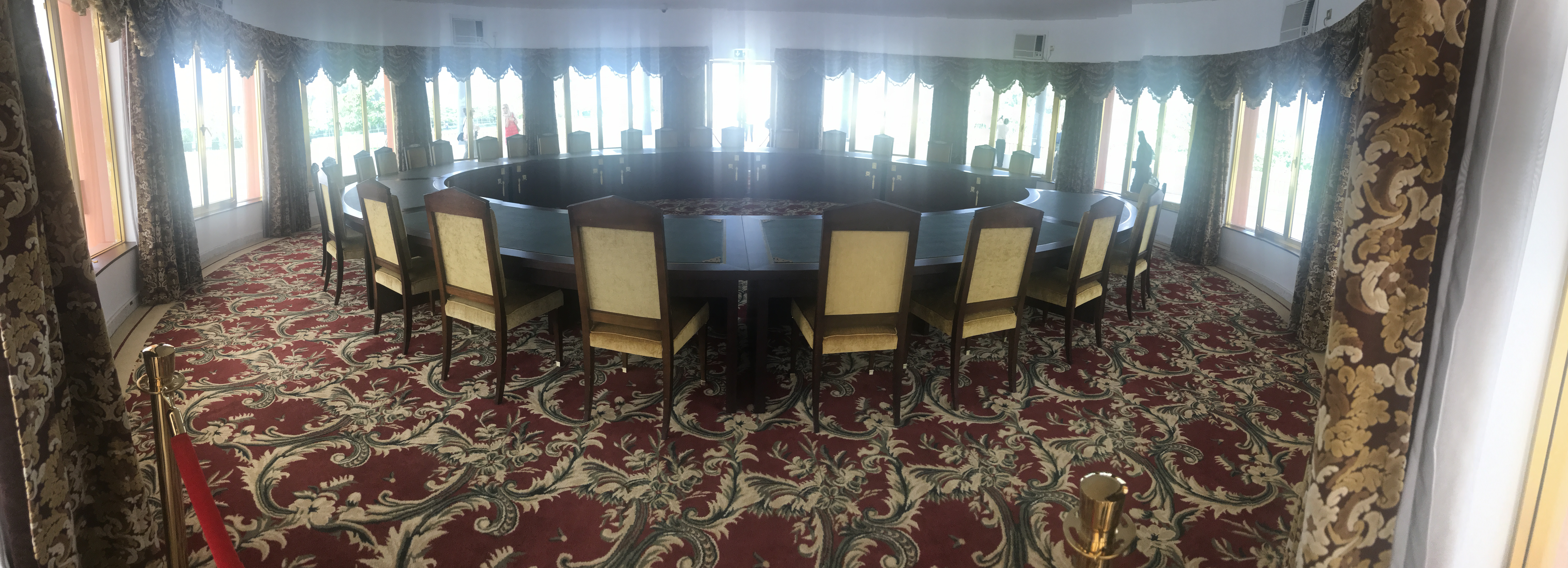
The meeting room where the first constitution was signed on 2 December 1971 in Dubai. Today it is part of the Etihad Museum.

The Historically independent kingdoms, the modern emirates that constitute the United Arab Emirates and the modern kingdoms of Qatar and Bahrain entered into a treaty with the United Kingdom in 1853 and agreed to a Perpetual Maritime Truce with the UK; the kingdoms were collectively referred to as the Trucial States or as Trucial Oman. Disputes between the states were often arbitrated by the United Kingdom. In the late 1960s, the Trucial States Council was formed by the emirates, as well as Qatar and Bahrain. The United Kingdom announced its decision to end the treaty relationships with the kingdoms in 1968. The nine kingdoms attempted to form a union of Arab Emirates, but were unable to agree upon the terms of the union. While Bahrain and Qatar became independent countries, the other seven emirates attempted to form a temporary, federal union in 1971.

In 1971, the Constitution, authored by the Palestinian-Jordanian Judge Adi Bitar, was established as a temporary legal and political framework. Article 9 of the Constitution states that the Capital shall be a new town on the border of Dubai and Abu Dhabi, to be completed within seven years and to be called "Al Karama"; however, a provision in the same article provided for Abu Dhabi to be the "temporary" capital of the Union and for Sheikh Zayed bin Sultan Al Nahyan, ruler of Abu Dhabi, to be the President of the United Arab Emirates.

In 1979, a draft "permanent" constitution was prepared which allowed for the creation of a unified military and judicial system. Initially, the emirate of Dubai was strongly opposed to the unification of the military forces and, along with Ras al Khaimah, refused to attend Supreme Council meetings of the union. Mediations by Saudi Arabia and Kuwait, as well as by other UAE rulers, reduced differences between Sheikh Rashid bin Saeed Al Maktoum, ruler of Dubai, and Sheikh Zayed bin Sultan Al Nahyan, ruler of Abu Dhabi.

In 1994, Abu Dhabi was made the permanent capital of the UAE, and in May 1996, six years after Sheikh Rashid bin Saeed al Maktoum's death, Dubai agreed to a permanent constitution, and one that would unify the armed forces of the UAE. However, Dubai, like Ras al Khaimah, maintains its own judicial courts, which are not subject to governance from the Supreme Court of the UAE.

== Preamble ==
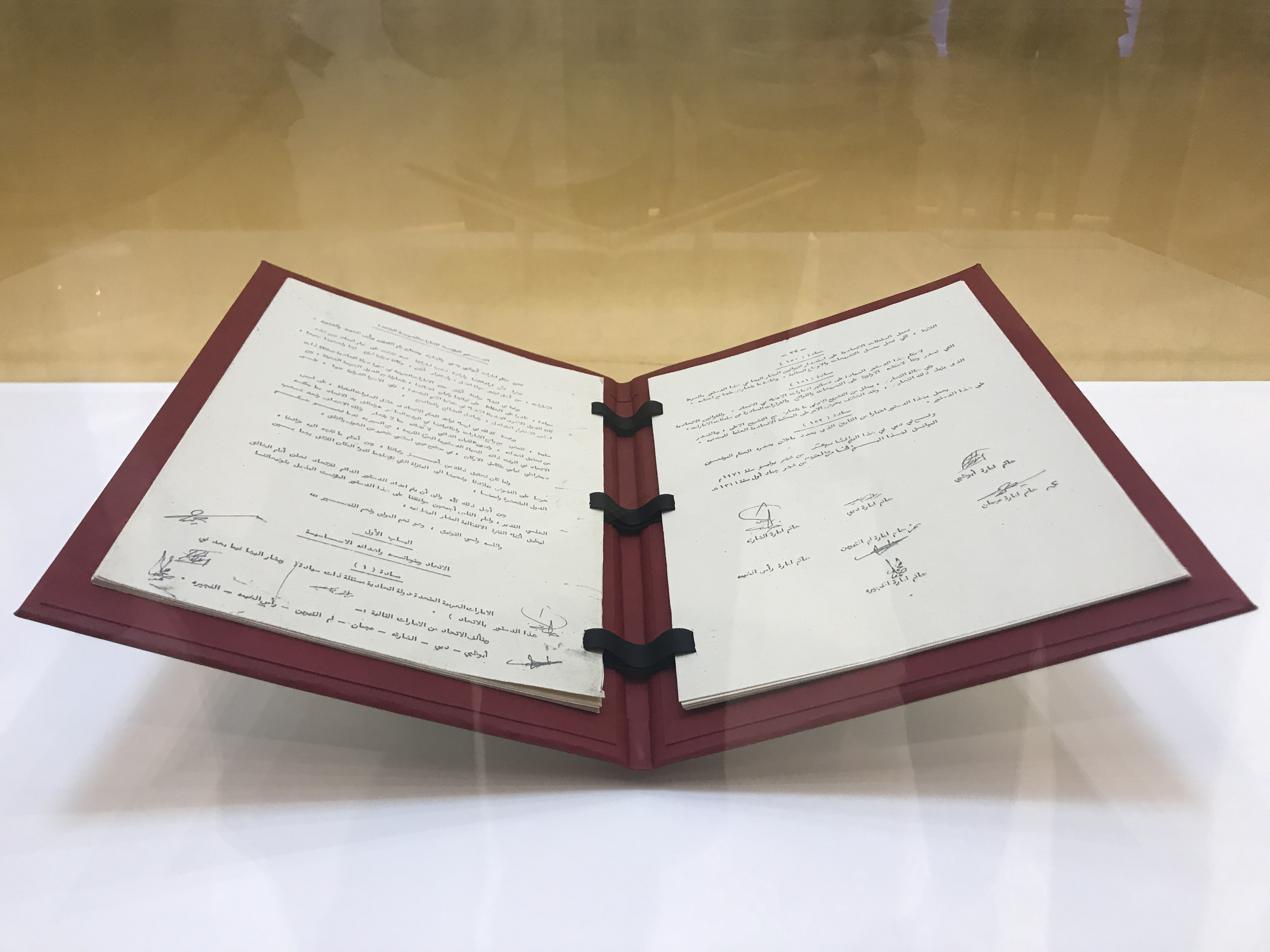
The first version of the UAE constitution bearing six signatures of the seven UAE founding fathers present at Etihad Museum. Ras Al Khaimah later signed the constitution on 10 February 1972.

The preamble of the constitution declares the intent of the rulers of six emirates (Ras al Khaimah joined the Union on 10 February 1972) to form a "comprehensive, democratic regime" in an "Islamic, Arab society".

We, the Rulers of the Emirates of Abu Dhabi, Dubai, Sharjah, Ajman, Umm Al-Quwain and Fujairah,

Whereas it is our will and the desire of the people of our Emirates to establish a Union between these Emirates, to promote a better life, more solid stability and a higher international status for the Emirates and their people;

Desiring to create closer links between the Arab Emirates in the form of an independent, sovereign, Federal state, capable of protecting its existence and the existence of its members, in co-operation with the sister Arab states and with all other friendly states that are members of the United Nations Organization and of the family of nations in general, on a basis of mutual respect and reciprocal interests and benefits;

Desiring also to lay the foundation for federal rule in the coming years on a sound basis, in line with the realities and the capacities of the Emirates at the present time, enabling the Union, giving free hand to the Union to achieve its objectives, sustaining the identity of its members providing that this is not inconsistent with those objectives and preparing the people of the Union at the same time for a dignified and free constitutional life, and progressing by steps towards a comprehensive, representative, democratic regime in an Islamic and Arab society free from fear and anxiety;

And whereas the realization of the foregoing is our dearest wish, towards which we have bent our strongest resolution, being desirous of advancing our country and our people to the status of qualifying them to take appropriate place among civilized states and nations;

Announce to Allah, the Supreme and Almighty, and to all the people our approval of the Constitution undersigned by us.*

— Preamble, Constitution of the United Arab Emirates

== Parts of the Constitution ==
Some of the important articles and parts of the Constitution are listed below:

1. Part one
  1. Article 7 — Islam is the official state religion, Islamic Sharia the primary source of legislation
  2. Article 9 — Abu Dhabi is the capital of the Union. (The original constitution stated that Abu Dhabi was the temporary capital until the completion of Al Karama; however, the qualification was removed in Constitutional Amendment No. (1) dated 2 December 1996)
  3. Article 10 —the aim of the Union is the maintenance of its independence and sovereignty
  4. Article 11 — the Union forms a single economic and customs entity; free movement of all capital and goods between emirates is guaranteed; all inter-emirate taxes, duties and tolls are abolished
  5. Article 12 — Foreign policy will be to support Arab and Islamic causes and consolidation of friendship and co-operation with all nations on the basis of the Charter of the United Nations
2. Part Two: Fundamental Social and Economic Basis of the Union
  1. Article 14 — Equality, social justice, ensuring safety and security and equality of opportunity for all citizens
  2. Article 15 — The family is the basis of society. It is founded on morality, religion, ethics and patriotism. The law shall guarantee its existence, safeguard and protect it from corruption
  3. Article 17 — Compulsory education at the primary level
  4. Article 21 — Private property will be protected
  5. Article 22 — The protection of public property is the duty of every citizen
3. Part Three: Freedom, Rights and Public Duties
  1. Article 25 — All persons are equal before the law, without distinction between citizens of the Union in regard to race, nationality, religious belief or social status.
  2. Personal liberty is guaranteed; no person may be arrested, searched, detained or imprisoned except in accordance with the provisions of law
  3. Article 28 — penalty is personal; an accused shall be innocent until proven guilty
  4. Article 29 — freedom of movement is guaranteed, within the limits of the law
  5. Article 30 — freedom of expression is guaranteed, within the limits of the law
  6. Article 32 — freedom to exercise religious worship is guaranteed in accordance with established customs and provided it does not conflict with public policy or violate public morals
  7. Article 33 — freedom of assembly is guaranteed, within the limits of the law
4. Part Four: Union Authorities
  1. Article 45 — establishes the Supreme Council of the Union (SCN), the Council of Ministers, the National Assembly and the Judiciary.
  2. National Assembly composition: 8 seats each of Abu Dhabi and Dubai, 6 each for Sharjah and Ras al Khaimah, and 4 each for Ajman, Umm al Quwain and Fujairah
  3. Articles 51 and 52 — election and term of office of President and Vice President
  4. Article 108 — The President is required to confirm all death sentences imposed by a Union judicial authority
5. Part Five: Union Legislation and Decrees and the Authorities having Jurisdiction therein
6. Part Six: The Emirates
  1. Article 123 — the emirates may retain their individual memberships in OPEC
7. Part Seven
  1. Islam is the official religion of the Union. The Islamic Sharia shall be a main source of legislation in the Union. The official language of the Union is Arabic.
8. Part Eight: Financial Affairs of the Union
9. Part Nine: Armed Forces and Security Forces
  1. Article 137 — Any attack on one emirate is an attack on all emirates and upon the existence of the Union
  2. Article 138 — establishment of a unified air force, navy and land army
10. Part Ten: Final and Transitional Provisions
  1. Article 145 — The Constitution cannot be suspended except when martial law is in effect
