= Etihad Museum =

- متحف الإتحاد

- The museum in 2017
- Former name: Union House
- Established: 2 December 2016
- Location: 1 Jumeira Road, Dubai, United Arab Emirates
- Coordinates: 25.23°N 55.26°E
- Type: History museum
- Architects: Moriyama and Teshima Architects
- Website: etihadmuseum.dubaiculture.ae

The Etihad Museum (Arabic: متحف الاتحاد), historically called the Union House (Arabic: دار الاتحاد) and formerly as the al-Diyafah Palace and the Jumeirah Guesthouse, is a museum in Dubai, United Arab Emirates that collects, preserves, and displays the heritage of the United Arab Emirates in the areas of social, political, cultural, scientific, and military history. It holds everything from old passports to personal artifacts of the rulers of United Arab Emirates. The historic signing of the Constitution of the United Arab Emirates, the raising of the first UAE flag, and the formation of the United Arab Emirates as a country on 2 December 1971 took place within the area that forms the museum today. The museum is designed as a document to signify the signing of the UAE constitution.

The Union House is one of three 'union sites' in the Emirates, locations which are celebrated as having played a crucial role in the foundation of the nation. The other two union sites are Argoub Al Sedirah, the location where Sheikh Zayed bin Sultan Al Nahyan and Sheikh Rashid bin Saeed Al Maktoum discussed and shook hands on the idea of a Union of Arab Emirates and Al Khawaneej Farm where a number of key meetings between Trucial Rulers prior to the Union took place,

== History ==
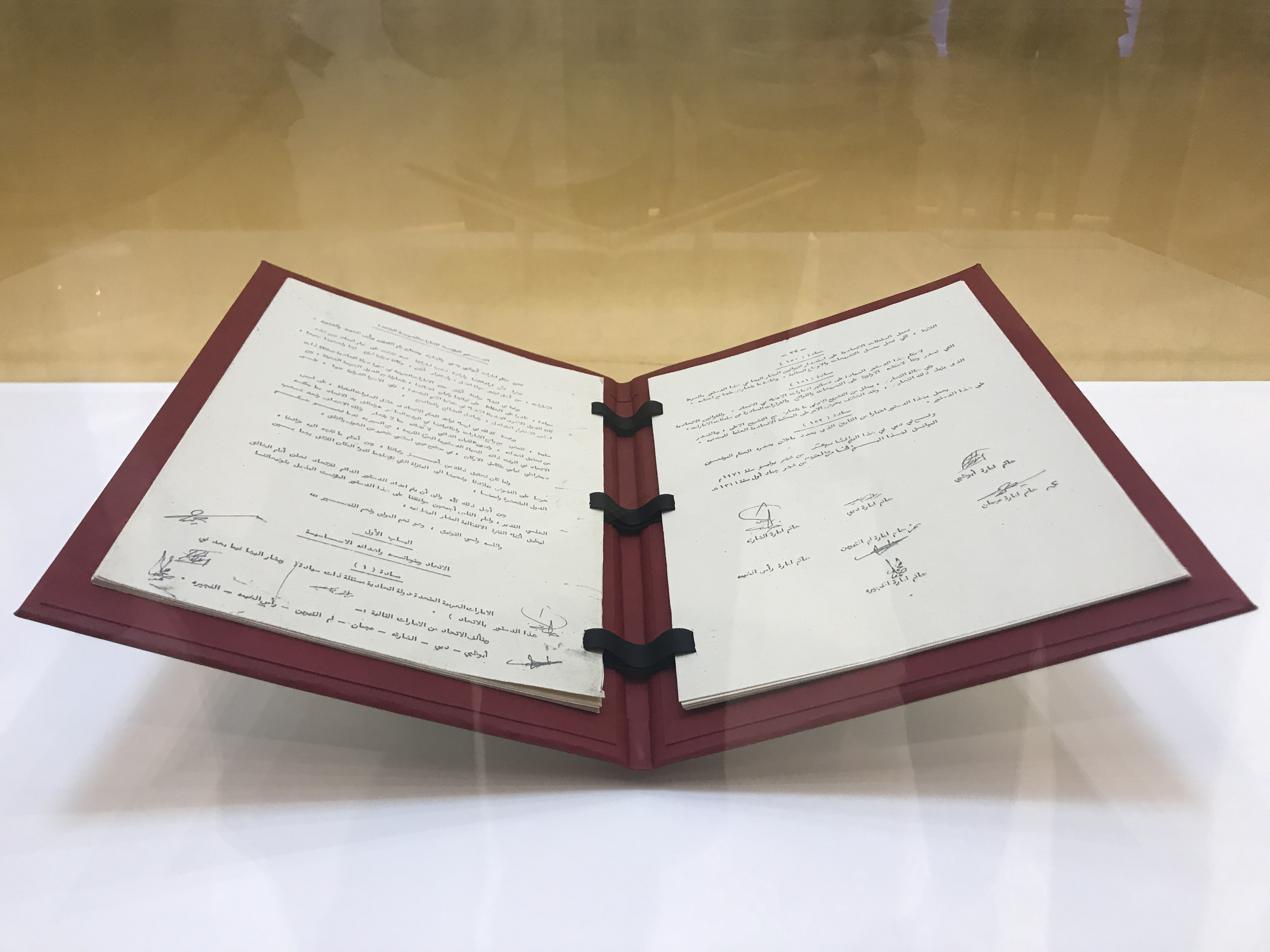
The first version of the UAE constitution bearing six signatures of the seven UAE founding fathers

The museum encompasses the Union house, the location where the emirate's founding fathers signed a declaration that marked the formation of the UAE in 1971 – it is now part of the museum complex.

== Exhibitions and programmes ==
The museum's exhibitions focus mainly on the period from 1968 to 1974, covering the events that led to the formation of the United Arab Emirates. Through interactive exhibits and educational programmes, the museum presents the story of the union from the perspective of the country's leaders. It also highlights the UAE Constitution, including the rights and responsibilities associated with citizenship. The museum's collections include documents and materials related to the founding of the country, and it supports research and publication on the history of the union.

== Building ==
The museum was designed by Moriyama & Teshima Architects in the shape of a manuscript, with seven columns built into the museum to resemble the pens used to sign the original declaration. The building has eight permanent pavilions:

Pavilion One: Shows a documentary film about the history of the UAE.

Pavilion Two: Houses a panoramic interactive map highlighting the era before the formation of the federation.

Pavilion Three: An interactive timeline that demonstrates key historical events before the union.

Pavilion Four: An interactive guide to the formation of the union.

Pavilion Five: A homage to the important moments and challenges confronted the founding fathers before 1971.

Pavilion Six: This is dedicated to the UAE Constitution and includes the actual declaration itself.

Pavilion Seven: The final pavilion is an open gallery celebrating the newborn nation.

== Gallery ==
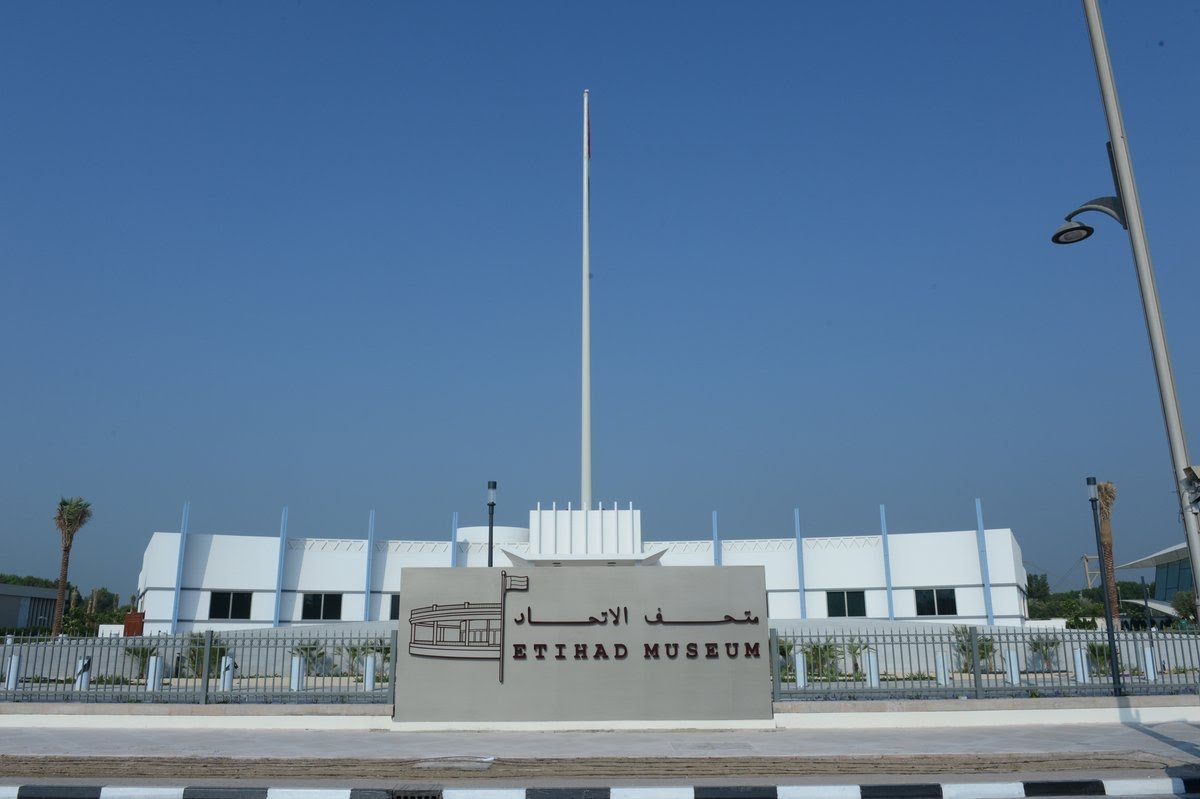
Etihad Museum in Dubai

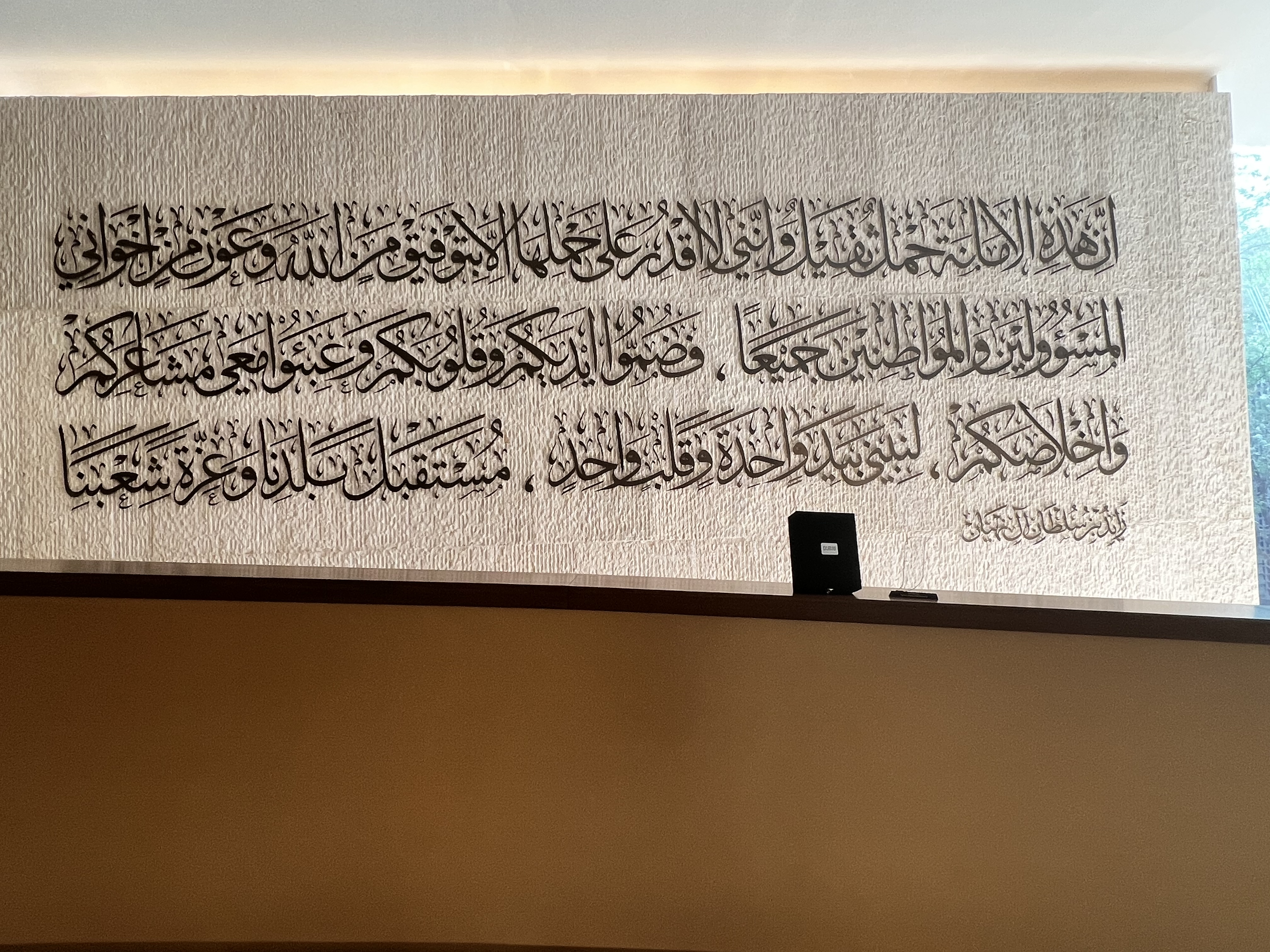
A quote by Sheikh Zayed bin Sultan Al Nahyan

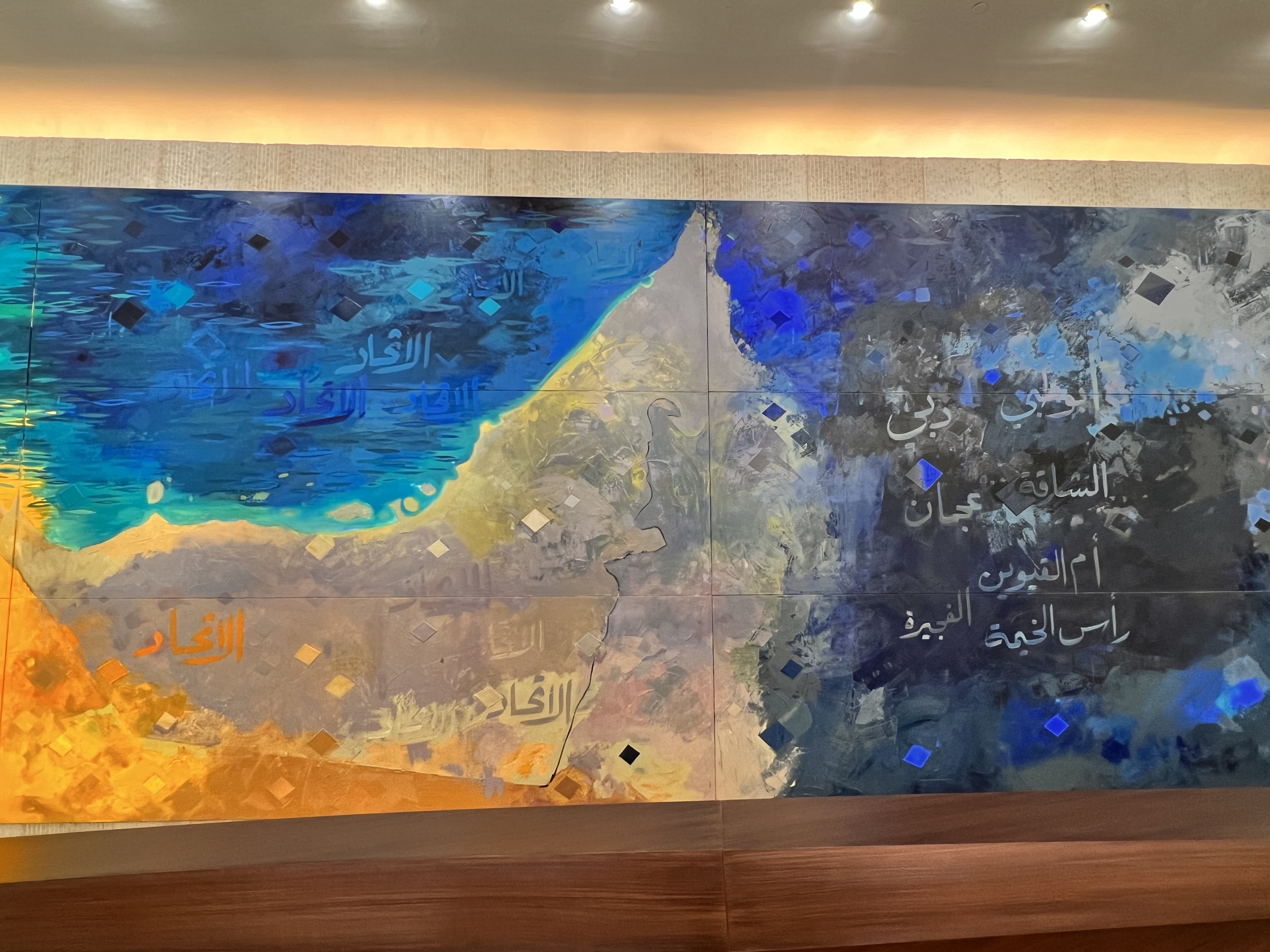
Map of the United Arab Emirates

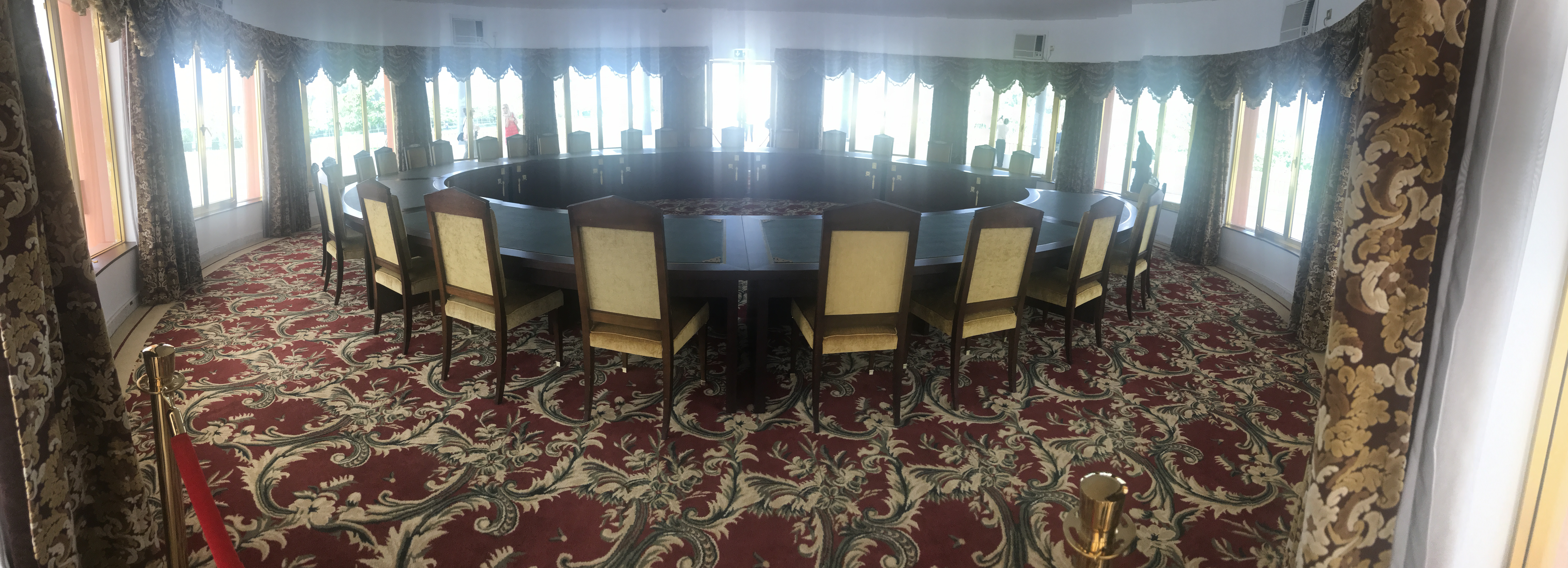
Meeting room where the UAE unification treaty was signed

== See also ==
- List of museums in the United Arab Emirates
- Culture of the United Arab Emirates
