= International propagation of the Salafi movement and Wahhabism =

Starting in the mid-1970s and 1980s, the international propagation of Salafism and Wahhabism within Sunni Islam and throughout the Muslim world, favored by the conservative oil-exporting Kingdom of Saudi Arabia and other Gulf monarchies, achieved (Note: what the French political scientist Gilles Kepel defined as) a "preeminent position of strength in the global expression of Islam". The Saudi interpretation of Islam not only includes Salafism and Wahhabism but also Islamist and revivalist interpretations of Islam, and a "hybrid" of the two interpretations (until the 1990s).

During the Cold War, the United States and the United Kingdom launched covert and overt campaigns to encourage and strengthen Islamists in the Middle East, North Africa, Central and Southern Asia. These Islamists were seen as a hedge against potential expansion by the Soviet Union, and as a counterweight against nationalist and socialist movements that were seen as a threat to the interests of the Western nations. In 1957, in a meeting with the CIA's Frank Wisner and the Joint Chiefs of Staff, President Eisenhower gave approval to a policy that included doing "everything possible to stress the 'holy war' aspect", and sending weapons to the Saudi-led conservative monarchies to counteract socialist Arab nationalists. In 1979, following the Soviet intervention in Afghanistan, National Security Advisor Zbigniew Brzezinski wrote: "We should concert with Islamic countries both in a propaganda campaign and in a covert action campaign to help the rebels." In a 2018 interview with The Washington Post, Mohammed bin Salman, the de facto ruler of Saudi Arabia, said that "investments in mosques and madrassas overseas were rooted in the Cold War, when allies asked Saudi Arabia to use its resources to prevent inroads in Muslim countries by the Soviet Union."

The impetus for the international propagation of Salafism and Wahhabism was, according to political scientist Alex Alexiev, "the largest worldwide propaganda campaign ever mounted", David A. Kaplan described it as "dwarfing the Soviets' propaganda efforts at the height of the Cold War" funded by petroleum exports. Others such as Peter Mandaville, former advisor in the Secretary of State's Office of Religion & Global Affairs at the U.S. Department of State, have cautioned against such hyperbolic assertions, pointing out the unreliability of inconsistent data estimates based on "non-specific hearsay".

From 1982 to 2005, the Saudi government, in an effort to spread the Salafi-Wahhabi brand of Islam across the world (da'wah Salafiyya), spent over $75 billion via international organizations affiliated with the House of Saud (Note: The Muslim World League, the World Assembly of Muslim Youth, the International Islamic Relief Organization, and various Saudi royal charities. The propaganda campaign to spread the Salafi-Wahhabi brand of Islam has been led by Prince Salman bin Abdul-Aziz from 1982 to 2005, who was Minister of Defense at the time, and became king in January 2015.) and religious attaches at dozens of Saudi embassies, to establish/build 200 Islamic colleges, 210 Islamic centers, 1,500 mosques, and 2,000 schools for Muslim children in Muslim-majority countries and elsewhere. Mosque funding was combined with persuasion to propagate the dawah Salafiyya; schools were "fundamentalist" in outlook and formed a network "from Sudan to northern Pakistan". Supporting proselytizing or preaching of Islam (Note: Dawah, which literally means "making an invitation" to Islam.) has been called "a religious requirement" for Saudi rulers that cannot [or could not] be abandoned "without losing their domestic legitimacy" as protectors and propagators of Islam.

Other strict and conservative interpretations of Sunni Islam assisted by funding from the Gulf monarchies include the Muslim Brotherhood and Jamaat-e-Islami (until the break between the Muslim Brotherhood and Gulf monarchies in the 1990s). While their alliances were not always permanent, they were said to have formed a "joint venture", sharing a strong "revulsion" against Western influences, a belief in strict implementation of Islamic law (sharīʿa), an opposition to both Shia Muslims and popular Islamic religious practices (the veneration of Muslim saints and visitations of their tombs), and a belief in the importance of armed jihad. A "fusion", or "hybrid", of the two movements came out of the Afghan jihad, where thousands of Muslims were trained and equipped under the CIA's Operation Cyclone to fight against Soviets and their Afghan allies in Afghanistan in the 1980s.

The funding has been criticized for promoting an intolerant, fanatical form of Islam that several political scientists and scholars of international relations consider to be the core cause of Islamic extremism and religiously motivated terrorism worldwide, along with the Islamist ideology and practice of excommunication (takfīr). In 2013, the European Parliament identified Wahhabism as the main source of global terrorism. Critics argue that some Arab volunteers who mobilized to fight in Afghanistan subsequently formed or joined militant organizations that waged insurgencies against governments and carried out attacks against civilians in other Muslim countries. They further argue that some groups that emerged from or were associated with these networks — including the Armed Islamic Group of Algeria, the Islamic State, and various al-Qaeda branches — targeted not only non-Muslims (kuffār) but also Muslims whom they regarded as apostates, including Shia Muslims and Sufi ascetics. As of 2017, changes to Saudi religious policy have led some to suggest that "Islamists throughout the world will have to follow suit or risk winding up on the wrong side of orthodoxy".

== Background ==
Religion in Saudi Arabia is dominated and heavily influenced by the Salafi brand of Sunni Islam and its Wahhabi ideology, a political and religious ideology named after Muhammad ibn Abd al-Wahhab, an 18th-century Sunni Muslim preacher, scholar, and theologian from the Najd region in central Arabia, founder of the Islamic revivalist and reformist movement known as Wahhabism. Despite being opposed and rejected by some of his contemporary critics amongst the religious clergy, Ibn ʿAbd al-Wahhab charted a religio-political pact with Muhammad bin Saud to help him to establish the Emirate of Diriyah, the first Saudi state, and began a dynastic alliance and power-sharing arrangement between their families which continues to the present day in the Kingdom of Saudi Arabia. The Al ash-Sheikh, Saudi Arabia's leading religious family, are the descendants of Ibn ʿAbd al-Wahhab, and have historically led the ulama in the Saudi state, dominating the state's clerical institutions.

Although Saudi Arabia had been an oil exporter since 1939, and active leading the conservative opposition among Arab states to Gamal Abdel Nasser's progressive and secularist Arab nationalism since the beginning of the Arab Cold War in the 1960s, it was the October 1973 War that greatly enhanced its wealth and stature, and ability to advocate Salafi missionary activities.

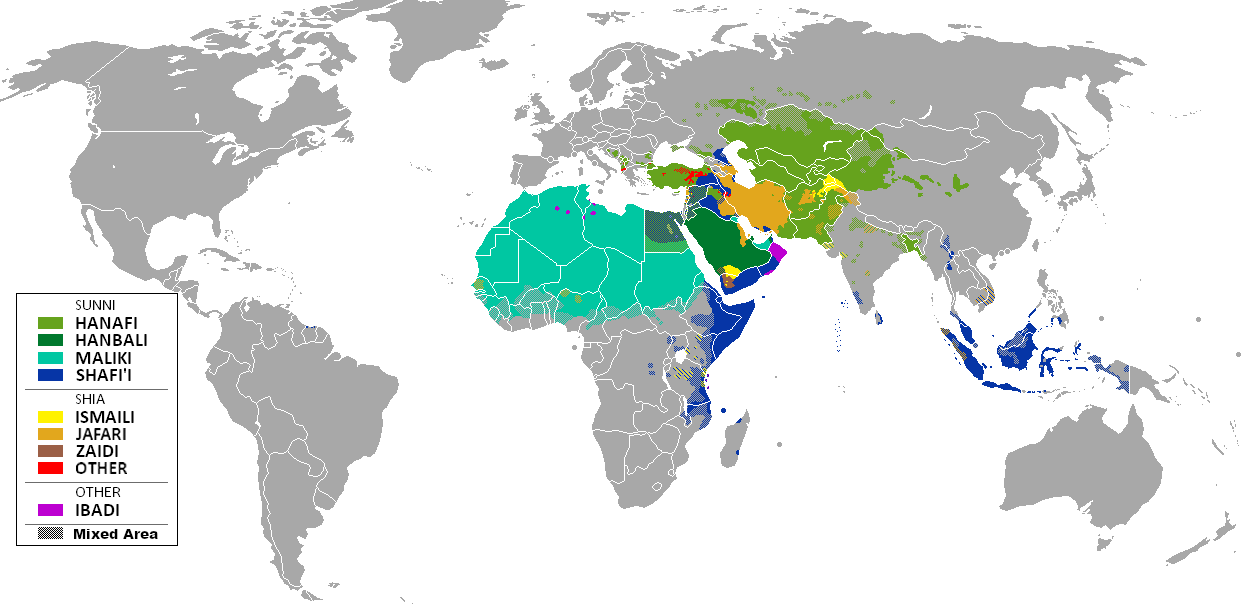
Map of the Muslim world. Hanbali (dark green) is the predominant Sunni school of Islamic jurisprudence in Saudi Arabia and Qatar.

According to political scientist Gilles Kepel, prior to the 1973 oil embargo, religion throughout the Muslim world was "dominated by national or local traditions rooted in the piety of the common people", and mystical Sufi brotherhoods (Tariqa) were the primary social bonds for both urban and rural populations across the Muslim world. The majority of the Muslim population consisted of illiterate farmers. These Sufi orders served as a bridge, reconciling the local traditional beliefs, some of them pre-Islamic, of the uneducated masses, with the bookish culture of Islam. Muslim clerics looked to their different schools of Islamic jurisprudence (the four legal schools in Sunni Islam, plus the Ja'fari school in Shia Islam):

- Hanafi in the Turkic lands, the Middle East, and South Asia;
- Maliki in the Sahara;
- Shafi'i in Southeast Asia and the Horn of Africa;
- Hanbali in parts of the Arabian Peninsula.

The first three schools "held Saudi inspired puritanism" (the Hanbali school) in "great suspicion on account of its sectarian character," according to French political scientist Gilles Kepel. But the legitimacy of this class of traditional Islamic jurists had become undermined in the 1950s and '60s by the power of postcolonial nationalist governments. In "the vast majority" of Muslim countries, the private religious endowments (awqaf) that had supported the independence of the Islamic scholars/jurists for centuries were taken over by the state and the jurists were made salaried employees. The nationalist rulers naturally encouraged their employees (and their employees interpretations of Islam) to serve their employer/rulers' interests, and inevitably the jurists came to be seen by the Muslim public as doing so.

In Egypt's "shattering" 1967 defeat, "Land, Sea and Air" had been the military slogan; in the perceived victory of the October 1973 war, it was replaced with the Islamic battle cry of Allahu Akbar. While the Yom Kippur War was started by Egypt and Syria to take back the land conquered in 1967 by Israel, the "real victors" of the war were the Arab "oil-exporting countries", according to Kepel, whose embargo against Israel's Western allies stopped Israel's counteroffensive. The embargo's political success enhanced the prestige of the embargoists, and the reduction in the global supply of oil sent oil prices soaring (from U.S.$3 per barrel to nearly $12) and with them, oil exporter revenues. This put Arab oil-exporting states in a "clear position of dominance within the Muslim world." The most dominant was Saudi Arabia, the largest exporter by far (see bar chart below).

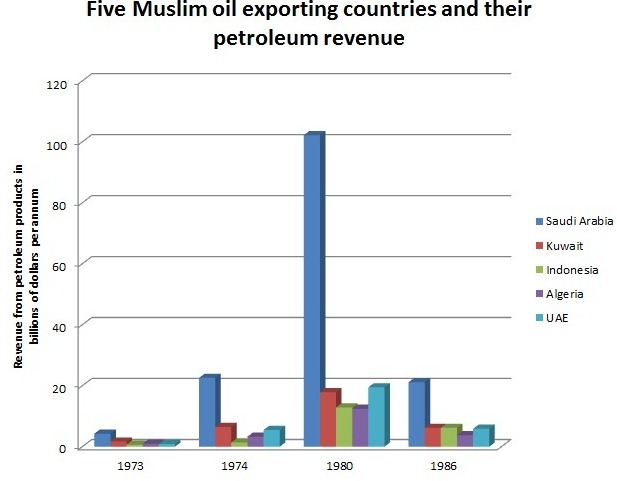
Petroleum products revenue in billions of dollars per annum for five major Muslim petroleum exporting countries. Saudi Arabian production Years were chosen to show revenue for before (1973) and after (1974) the October 1973 War, after the Iranian Revolution (1978–1979), and during the market turnaround in 1986. Iran and Iraq are excluded because their revenue fluctuated due to the revolution and the war between them.

Saudi Arabians viewed their oil wealth not as an accident of geology or history, but directly connected to their practice of religion—a blessing given them by God, "vindicate them in their separateness from other cultures and religions," but also something to "be solemnly acknowledged and lived up to" with pious behavior, and so "legitimize" its prosperity and buttressing and "otherwise fragile" dynasty.

With its new wealth, the rulers of Saudi Arabia sought to replace nationalist movements in the Muslim world with Islam, to bring Islam "to the forefront of the international scene", and to unify Islam worldwide under the a single Salafi creed, paying particular attention to Muslims who had immigrated to the West (a "special target"). In the words of journalist Scott Shane, "when Saudi imams arrived in Muslim countries in Asia or Africa, or in Muslim communities in Europe or the Americas, wearing traditional Arabian robes, speaking the language of the Quran — and carrying a generous checkbook — they had automatic credibility."

=== Non-Salafi Muslim influence ===
For Salafists, working with grassroots non-Salafi Islamist groups and individuals had significant advantages, because outside of Saudi Arabia, the audience for Salafi doctrines were limited to the elites and "religiously conservative milieus," and the majority of people followed popular folk culture associated with local variants of Sufism. When Saudi first took control of the Hejaz, the Wahhabi Salafis in particular made up less than 1% of the world Muslim population. Saudi Arabia founded and funded transnational organizations and headquartered them in the kingdom—the most well known being the World Muslim League—but many of the guiding figures in these bodies were foreign Salafis (including the Muslim Brotherhood, an organization defined as Salafi in the broad sense), not Arabian Wahhabis or Indian Ahl-e-Hadith. The World Muslim League distributed books and cassettes by non-Salafi foreign Islamist activists including Hassan al-Banna (founder of the Muslim Brotherhood), Sayyid Qutb (Egyptian founder of radical Salafi-Jihadist doctrine of Qutbism), etc. Members of the Brotherhood also provided "critical manpower" for the international efforts of the Muslim World League and other Saudi backed organizations. Saudi Arabia successfully courted academics at Al-Azhar University, and invited radical Islamists to teach at its own universities where they influenced Saudis like Osama bin Laden.

One observer (Trevor Stanley) argues that "Saudi Arabia is commonly characterized as aggressively exporting Wahhabism, it has in fact imported pan-Islamic Salafism," which influenced native Saudi religious/political beliefs. Muslim Brotherhood members fleeing persecution of Arab nationalist regimes in Egypt and Syria were given refuge in Saudi and sometimes ended up teaching in Saudi schools and universities. Muhammad Qutb, the brother of the highly influential Sayyid Qutb, came to Saudi Arabia after being released from prison. There, he taught as a professor of Islamic Studies and edited and published the books of his older brother who had been executed by the Egyptian government. Hassan al-Turabi, who later became the "éminence grise" in the government of Sudanese president Jaafar Nimeiri, spent several years in exile in Saudi Arabia. "Blind Shiekh" Omar Abdel-Rahman lived in Saudi Arabia from 1977 to 1980 teaching at a girls' college in Riyadh. Al-Qaeda leader, Ayman al-Zawahiri, was also allowed into Saudi Arabia in the 1980s. Abdullah Yusuf Azzam, sometimes called "the father of the modern global jihad," was a lecturer at King Abdul Aziz University in Jeddah, Saudi Arabia, after being fired from his teaching job in Jordan and until he left for Pakistan in 1979. His famous fatwa, Defence of the Muslim Lands, the First Obligation after Faith, was supported by leading Salafi Sheikh Abd al-Aziz ibn Baz, and Muhammad ibn al Uthaymeen. Muslim Brethren who became wealthy in Saudi Arabia became key contributors to Egypt's Islamist movements.

Saudi Arabia backed the Pakistan-based Jamaat-i-Islami movement politically and financially even before the oil embargo (since the time of King Saud). Jamaat's educational networks received Saudi funding and Jamaat was active in the "Saudi-dominated" Muslim World League. The constituent council of the Muslim World League included non-Salafi Islamists and Islamic revivalists such as Said Ramadan, son-in-law of Hasan al-Banna (the founder of the Muslim Brotherhood), Abul A'la Maududi (founder of Jamaat-i-Islami), Maulanda Abu'l-Hasan Nadvi (d. 2000) of India. In 2013, when the Bangladeshi government cracked down on Jamaat-e Islami for war crimes during the Bangladesh liberation war, Saudi Arabia expressed its displeasure by cutting back on the number of Bangladeshi guest workers allowed to work in (and sent badly needed remittances from) Saudi Arabia.

Scholar Olivier Roy describes the cooperation beginning in the 1980s between Saudis and Arab Muslim Brothers as "a kind of joint venture." "The Muslim Brothers agreed not to operate in Saudi Arabia itself, but served as a relay for contacts with foreign Islamist movements" and as a "relay" in South Asia with "long established" movements like the Jamaat-i Islami and older Salafi reform movement of Ahl-i Hadith. "Thus the MB played an essential role in the choice of organisations and individuals likely to receive Saudi subsidies." Roy describes the Muslim Brotherhood and the Salafis as sharing "common themes of a reformist and puritanical preaching"; "common references" to Hanbali jurisprudence, while rejecting sectarianism in Sunni juridical schools; virulent opposition to both Shiism and popular Sufi religious practices (the veneration of Muslim saints). Along with cooperation, there was also competition between the two even before the Gulf War, with (for example) Saudis supporting the Islamic Salvation Front in Algeria and Jamil al-Rahman in Afghanistan, while the Brotherhood supported the movement of Sheikh Mahfoud Nahnah in Algeria and the Hezb-e Islami in Afghanistan. Gilles Kepel describes the MB and Saudis as sharing "the imperative of returning to Islam's 'fundamentals' and the strict implementation of all its injunctions and prohibitions in the legal, moral, and private spheres"; and David Commins, as their both having a "strong revulsion" against Western influences and an "unwavering confidence" that Islam is both the true religion and a "sufficient foundation for conducting worldly affairs." The "significant doctrinal differences" between the MBs/Islamists/Islamic revivalists include the Brotherhood's focus on "Muslim unity to ward off western imperialism"; on the importance of "eliminating backwardness" in the Muslim world through "mass public education, health care, minimum wages and constitutional government" (Commins); and its toleration of revolutionary as well as conservative social groups, contrasted with the exclusively social conservative orientation of Salafism.

Salafi alliances with, or assistance to, other conservative non-Salafi Sunni groups have not necessarily been permanent or without tension. A major rupture came after the August 1990 Invasion of Kuwait by Saddam Hussein's Iraq, which was opposed by the Saudi kingdom and supported by most if not all Islamic Revivalist groups, including many who had been funded by the Saudis. Saudi government and foundations had spent many millions on transportation, training, etc. Jihadist fighters in Afghanistan, many of whom then returned to their own country, including Saudi Arabia, to continue jihad with attacks on civilians. Osama bin Laden's passport was revoked in 1994. In March 2014, the Saudi government declared the Muslim Brotherhood a "terrorist organization." The "Islamic State", whose "roots are in Wahhabism," has vowed to overthrow the Saudi kingdom. In July 2015, Saudi author Turki al-Hamad lamented in an interview on Saudi Rotana Khalijiyya Television that "Our youth" serves as "fuel for ISIS" driven by the "prevailing" Saudi culture. "It is our youth who carry out bombings. … You can see [in ISIS videos] the volunteers in Syria ripping up their Saudi passports." (An estimated 2,500 Saudis have fought with ISIS.)

=== Influence of other conservative Sunni Persian Gulf-states ===
The other Gulf Kingdoms were smaller in population and oil wealth than Saudi Arabia but some (particularly UAE, Kuwait, Qatar) also aided conservative Sunni causes, including jihadist groups. According to Steve Clemmons, writing in The Atlantic magazine in 2014, "Qatar's military and economic largesse has made its way" to the al-Qaida group operating in Syria, "Jabhat al-Nusra". In March 2022, the Fourth High-Level Strategic Dialogue between the State of Qatar and the United Nations Office of Counter-Terrorism (UNOCT) discussed strategic priorities and collaboration for effective United Nations support to Member States on counterterrorism. The State of Qatar is the second largest contributor to the United Nations Trust Fund for Counter-Terrorism out of a total 35 other donors. In Kuwait, the "Revival of Islamic Heritage Society" funds al-Qaeda, according to the U.S. Treasury. According to Kristian Coates Ulrichsen, an associate fellow at Chatham House, "High profile Kuwaiti clerics were quite openly supporting groups like al-Nusra, using TV programmes in Kuwait to grandstand on it."

In mid-2017, tensions escalated between Saudi Arabia / UAE and Qatar, related to the way in which, and to what groups, Salafism is being propagated.

Qatar backed the Muslim Brotherhood in Egypt even after the 2013 overthrow of the MB regime of Mohamed Morsi, with Qatar ruler Sheikh Tamim bin Hamad Al Thani denouncing Morsi's removal from office. In June 2016, Morsi was sentenced to a life sentence for passing state secrets to Qatar.

Qatar has also backed Islamist factions in Libya, Syria and Yemen.

In Libya in particular, Qatar has supported the Islamist government established in Tripoli. During the 2011 revolution that ousted President Muammar Gaddafi, Qatar provided "tens of millions of dollars in aid, military training and more than 20,000 tons of weapons" to anti-Gaddafi rebels and Islamist militias in particular. The flow of weapons was not suspended after Gaddafi's government was removed. Qatar supported cleric Ali al-Sallabi, the leader of the Islamist militia "February 17 Katiba" Ismail al-Sallabi, and the Tripoli Military Council leader Abdel Hakim Belhaj.

Hamas, in Palestine, has received considerable financial support. Qatar has also hosted Hamas' politburo since 2012, which has met with international delegations on Qatari territory. More recently, Qatar has been accused of channeling material support to Hamas' terrorist operations under the guise of assisting Gaza reconstruction. (Hamas' politburo maintains that most of Qatar's support has been collected through charities and popular committees.) In 2024, Majed Al-Ansari, advisor to the prime minister of Qatar and the spokesperson for the Ministry of Foreign Affairs stated that "We did not enter into a relationship with Hamas because we wanted to. We were asked by the U.S. We reviewed that request in 2006", adding, "if you are going to attack Qatar by saying that Qatar funded Hamas – our partner in this funding was the Israeli government," claiming that, "as a matter of fact, we were asked to increase that aid, and on a number of times, we were asked to continue that aid when we were reconsidering providing aid to Gaza by the Israeli government."

=== Examples of the result of influence ===
Scott Shane of the New York Times gives the high percentage of Muslim supporting strict traditional punishments (citing a Pew Research study) as an example of Salafi influence in those countries. The Pew Research Center study reports that as of 2011,

- 82% of Muslims polled in Egypt and Pakistan, 70% in Jordan, and 56% in Nigeria support the stoning of people who commit adultery;
- 82% of Muslims polled in Pakistan, 77% in Egypt, 65% in Nigeria and 58% in Jordan support whippings and cutting off of hands for crimes like theft and robbery;
- 86% of Muslims polled in Jordan, 84% in Egypt, and 76% in Pakistan support the death penalty for those who leave the Muslim religion.

According to Shane, the influence of Saudi teaching on Muslim culture is particularly and literally visible in "parts of Africa and Southeast Asia", more women cover their hair and more men have grown beards.

== Types of influences ==
=== Pre-oil influence ===
Early in the 20th century, before the appearance of oil export wealth, other factors gave Salafiyya movement appeal to some Muslims according to one scholar (Khaled Abou El Fadl).

- Arab nationalism, (in the Arab Muslim world) which followed the Arab Salafi-Wahhabi attack on the (non-Arab) Ottoman Empire. Although the Salafis strongly opposed nationalism, the fact that they were Arab undoubtedly appealed to the large majority of Ottoman Empire citizens who were Arab also;
- Religious reformism, which followed a return to Salaf (as-Salaf aṣ-Ṣāliḥ);
- Destruction of the Hejaz Khilafa in 1925 (which had attempted to replace the Ottoman Caliphate);
- Control of Mecca and Medina, which gave Salafis great influence on Muslim culture and thinking;

=== "Petro-dollars" ===
According to scholar Gilles Kepel, (who devoted a chapter of his book Jihad to the subject – "Building Petro-Islam on the Ruins of Arab Nationalism"), in the years immediately after the 1973 War, "petro-Islam" was a "sort of nickname" for a "constituency" of Salafi preachers and Muslim intellectuals who promoted "strict implementation of the sharia [Islamic law] in the political, moral and cultural spheres". Estimates of Saudi spending on religious causes abroad include "upward of $100 billion"; between $2 and 3 billion per year since 1975 (compared to the annual Soviet propaganda budget of $1 billion/year); and "at least $87 billion" from 1987 to 2007. Funding came from the Saudi government, foundations, and private sources such as networks based on religious authorities. (Note: During the Afghan jihad against the Soviets, for example, in addition to the Saudi government, "Saudi movements or personalities such as Sheikh Abd al-Aziz ibn Baz, the highest authority of Wahhabism" had their own networks.)

In the coming decades, Saudi Arabia's interpretation of Islam became influential (according to Kepel) through

- the spread of Salafi religious doctrines via Saudi charities;
- an increased migration of Muslims to work in Saudi Arabia and other Persian Gulf states;
- a shift in the balance of power among Muslim states toward the oil-producing countries.

The use of petrodollars on facilities for the hajj—for example, leveling hill peaks to make room for tents, providing electricity for tents and cooling pilgrims with ice and air conditioning—has also been described as part of "Petro-Islam" (by author Sandra Mackey), and a way of winning the loyalty of the Muslim faithful to the Saudi government. Kepel describes Saudi control of the two holy cities as "an essential instrument of hegemony over Islam."

==== Religious funding ====
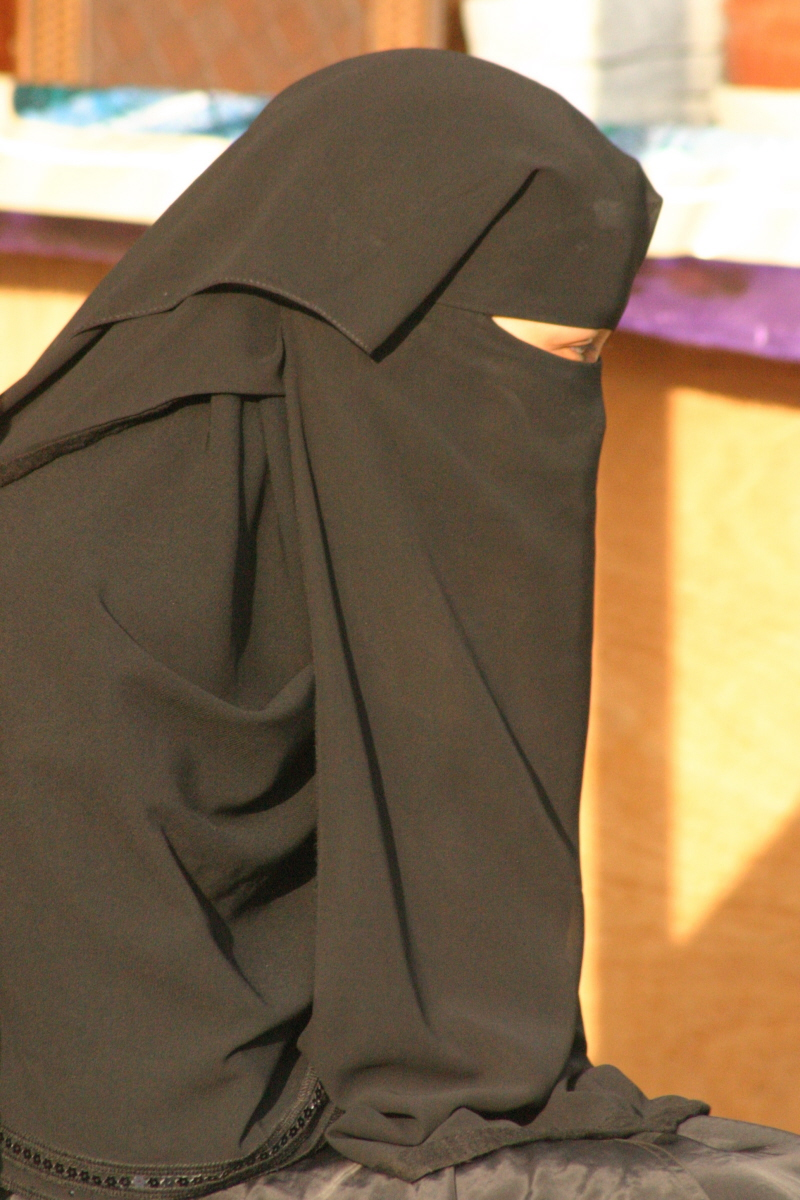
Woman in Saudi Arabia wearing a niqab

According to the World Bank, Saudi Arabia, Kuwait, and the United Arab Emirates provided official development assistance (ODA) to poor countries, averaging 1.5% of their gross national income (GNI) from 1973 to 2008, about five times the average assistance provided by Organisation for Economic Co-operation and Development (OECD) member states such as the United States. From 1975 to 2005, the Saudi Arabian government donated £49 billion in aid – the most of any donor country per capita. (This aid was to Muslim causes and countries. In 2006, Saudi made its first donation to a non-Muslim country—Cambodia.)

The Saudi ministry for religious affairs printed and distributed millions of Qurans free of charge. The late king also launched a publishing center in Medina that, by 2000, had distributed 138 million copies of the Quran (the central religious text of Islam) worldwide. They also printed and distributed doctrinal texts following Salafi interpretations. In mosques throughout the world "from the African plains to the rice paddies of Indonesia and the Muslim immigrant high-rise housing projects of European cities, the same books could be found," paid for by Saudi Arabian government. (According to journalist Dawood al-Shirian, the Saudi Arabian government, foundations and private sources, provide "90% of the expenses of the entire faith", throughout the Muslim World.) The European Parliament quotes an estimate of $10 billion being spent by Saudi Arabia to promote Salafi missionary activities through charitable foundations such as the International Islamic Relief Organization (IIRO), the al-Haramain Foundation, the Medical Emergency Relief Charity (MERC), World Muslim League and the World Assembly of Muslim Youth (WAMY).

==== Hajj ====
Hajj—"the greatest and most sacred annual assembly of Muslims on earth"—takes place in the Hejaz region of Saudi Arabia. While only 90,000 pilgrims visited Mecca in 1926, between 1.5 million and 2 million Muslims have made the pilgrims each year since 1979. Saudi control of the Hajj has been called "an essential instrument of hegemony over Islam."

In 1984, a massive printing complex was opened to print Qurans to give to each pilgrim. This was popularly viewed as the evidence for "Wahhabi generosity that was borne back to every corner of the Muslim community." King Fahd spent millions on "vast white marble halls and decorative arches" to enlarge worship space to hold "several hundred thousand more pilgrims."

In 1986, the Saudi king took the title of the "Custodian of the Two Holy Places", the better to emphasize Salafi control of Mecca and Medina.

===== Education =====
Saudi universities and religious institutes have trained thousands of teachers and preachers urging them to revive "Salafi" Islam. David Commins say they are propagating such doctrines frequently for "the idea of a pristine form of Islam practiced by the early Muslim generations". From Indonesia to France to Nigeria, the Saudi-trained and inspired Muslims aspire to rid religious practices of (what they believe to be) heretical innovations and to instill strict morality.

The Islamic University of Madinah was established as an alternative to the famous and venerable Al-Azhar University in Cairo, which was under Nasserist control in 1961 when the Islamic University was founded. The school was not under the jurisdiction of the Saudi grand mufti. The school was intended to education students from across the Muslim world, and eventually 85% of its student body was non-Saudi, making it an import tool for spreading Salafi Islam internationally.

Many of Egypt's future ulama attended the university. Muhammad Sayyid Tantawy, who later became the grand mufti of Egypt, spent four years at the Islamic University. Tantawy demonstrated his devotion to the kingdom in a June 2000 interview with the Saudi newspaper Ain al-Yaqeen, where he blamed the "violent campaign" against Saudi human rights policy on the campaigners' antipathy towards Islam. "Saudi Arabia leads the world in the protection of human rights because it protects them according to the sharia of God."

According to Mohamed Charfi, a former minister of education in Tunisia, "Saudi Arabia ... has also been one of the main supporters of Islamic fundamentalism because of its financing of schools following the ... Wahhabi doctrine. Saudi-backed madrasas in Pakistan and Afghanistan have played significant roles" in the strengthening of "radical Islam" there.

Saudi funding to Egypt's al-Azhar center of Islamic learning has been credited with causing that institution to adopt a more religiously conservative approach.

Following the October 2002 Bali bombings, an Indonesian commentator (Jusuf Wanandi) worried about the danger of "extremist influences of Wahhabism from Saudi Arabia" in the educational system.

===== Literature =====
The works of one strict classical Islamic jurist often cited in Salafi books — Ibn Taymiyyah — were distributed for free throughout the world starting in the 1950s. Critics complain that Ibn Taymiyyah has been cited by perpetrators of violence or fanaticism: "Muhammad abd-al-Salam Faraj, the spokesperson for the group that assassinated Egyptian President Anwar Sadat in 1981; in GIA tracts calling for the massacre of 'infidels' during the Algerian civil war in the 1990s; and today on Internet sites exhorting Muslim women in the west to wear veils as a religious obligation."

Insofar as curriculum used by foreign students in Saudi Arabia or in Saudi-sponsored schools mirrors that of Saudi schools, critics complain that traditionally it "encourages violence toward others, and misguides the pupils into believing that in order to safeguard their own religion, they must violently repress and even physically eliminate the 'other.'"

As of 2006, despite promises by then Saudi foreign minister Prince Saud Al-Faisal that "...the whole system of education is being transformed from top to bottom," the Center for Religious Freedom found

the Saudi public school religious curriculum continues to propagate an ideology of hate toward the "unbeliever," that is, Christians, Jews, Shiites, Sufis, Sunni Muslims who do not follow Wahhabi doctrine, Hindus, atheists and others. This ideology is introduced in a religion textbook in the first grade and reinforced and developed in following years of the public education system, culminating in the twelfth grade, where a text instructs students that it is a religious obligation to do "battle" against infidels in order to spread the faith.

A study was undertaken by the Policy Exchange. Published material was examined from many mosques and Islamic institutions within the United Kingdom. The 2007 study uncovered a considerable volume of Salafi material. The preface wording of the first (of 11 recommendations of the study) says, "The Kingdom of Saudi Arabia must come clean about the publication and dissemination of this material abroad". The study report is entitled, The hijacking of British Islam: How extremist literature is subverting mosques in the UK.

===== Literature translations =====
In distributing free copies of English translations of the Quran, Saudi Arabia naturally used interpretations favored by its religious establishment. An example being sura 33, ayah 59 where a literal translation of a verse (according to critic Khaled M. Abou El Fadl) would read:

O Prophet! Tell your wives and thy daughters and the women of the believers to lower (or possibly, draw upon themselves) their garments. This is better so that they will not be known and molested. And, God is forgiving and merciful.

while the authorized version reads:

O Prophet! Tell your wives and thy daughters and the women of the believers to draw their cloaks (veils) all over their bodies (i.e. screen themselves completely except the eyes or one eye to see the way). That will be better, that they should be known (as free respectable women) so as not to be annoyed. And Allah is Ever Oft-Forgiving, Most Merciful.

In the translation of the Al-Fatiha, the first surah, parenthetical references to Jews and Christians are added, speaking of addressing Allah "those who earned Your Anger (such as the Jews), nor of those who went astray (such as the Christians)." According to Seyyed Hossein Nasr, professor of Islamic studies at George Washington University and the editor in chief of The Study Quran, these explanations of who makes God angry and who went astray have "no basis in Islamic tradition."

Passages in commentaries and Tafsir that Salafis disapproved of were deleted, such as a nineteenth-century Sufi scholar's reference to Wahhabis as the "agents of the devil".

===== Mosques =====
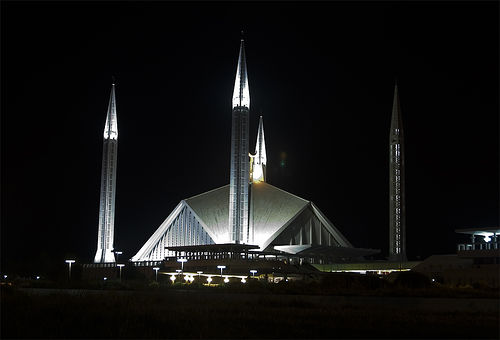
Faisal Mosque in Islamabad was built after a $28 million grant from King Faisal of Saudi Arabia.

More than 1,500 mosques were built around the world from 1975 to 2000 paid for by Saudi public funds. The Saudi-headquartered and financed Muslim World League played a pioneering role in supporting Islamic associations, mosques, and investment plans for the future. It opened offices in "every area of the world where Muslims lived." From 1964 to 2004, Saudi Arabia built 1359 mosques, 210 Islamic centres, 202 colleges and 2000 schools in non-Muslim-majority countries. Saudi donations totalling "many billions" of riyals financed 16 American mosques, four Canadian, and some in London, Madrid, Brussels and Geneva.

The process of financing mosques usually involved presenting a local office of the Muslim World League with evidence of the need for a mosque/Islamic center to obtain the offices "recommendation" (tazkiya) that the Muslim group hoping for a mosque would present, not to the Saudi government, but to "a generous donor" within the kingdom or the United Arab Emirates.

Saudi-financed mosques did not adhere to local Islamic architectural traditions, but were built in the austere Salafi style, using marble "international style" design and green neon lighting. An example is Gazi Husrev-beg in Sarajevo whose restoration was funded and supervised by Saudis, was stripped of its ornate Ottoman tilework and painted wall decorations, to the disapproval of some local Muslims.

Former British ambassador to Saudi Arabia, Sir William Patey, has asserted that Saudi Arabia's funding of mosques and promotion of Salafi Wahhabism in Europe has led to radicalization and fundamentalist extremism in the continent. The Henry Jackson Society has published a report linking Saudi promotion of Salafism to violent extremism in the United Kingdom. A leaked intelligence report from Germany's BfV domestic intelligence agency and Federal Intelligence Service (BND) also asserted that Saudi Arabia, Kuwait and Qatar supported extremist Islamic groups inside Germany. The European Union and the United States have remarked in several occasions Saudi Arabia's promotion of Salafism and its possible link with violent fundamentalism in the West.

===== Televangelism =====
One of the most popular Islamic preachers is Indian "televangelist" Zakir Naik, a controversial figure who believes that then U.S. President George W. Bush orchestrated the 9/11 attacks. Naik dresses in a suit rather than traditional garb and gives colloquial lectures speaking in English, not Urdu. His Peace TV channel reaches a reported 100 million viewers. According to Indian journalist Shoaib Daniyal, Naik's "massive popularity amongst India's English-speaking Muslims" is a reflection of "how deep Salafism has spread its roots".

Naik has gotten at least some publicity and funds in the form of Islamic awards from Saudi and other Gulf states. His awards include:

- the 2015 King Faisal International Prize for Services to Islam, worth $200,000;
- Islamic Personality of the Year Award 2013 from the Dubai International Holy Quran Award. The award was presented by Hamdan bin Rashid Al Maktoum, Ruler of Dubai and Minister of Finance and Industry of the United Arab Emirates;
- The 2013 Sharjah Award for Voluntary Work from the Sultan bin Muhammad Al-Qasimi, emir of Sharjah (one of the emirates of the UAE).

===== Ethnic evangelism =====
In the 1980s and 1990s, a group of African American Muslims received scholarships to Saudi universities in the hopes that they would "aggressively" spread Salafi Islam when they returned to their home countries. Among them were Abu Ameenah Bilal Philips, who generated wide appeal among Salafi and non-Salafi Muslims. A strong African American Salafi movement emerged following the efforts of Philips and other Saudi-educated African American Salafi, along with the regular networks and relationships they established and maintained with the major Salafi scholars in Saudi Arabia, such as Ibn Baz (d. 1999) and al-Uthaymin (d. 2001) Philips help create an indelible connection between Saudi Arabian Salafism and African American Salafis, according to Jefrey Diamant:

African American Salafi movement existence was inextricably linked to Saudi proselytization efforts. Crucially, the Salafi mosques would nurture relationships with elderly shaykhs in Saudi Arabia whose words from Medina would directly affect communal disputes that arose among African American Salafis. Fatwas and other statements made by these shaykhs were issued six thousand miles away.

===== Other means =====
According to critic Khaled Abou El Fadl, the funding available to those who support official Saudi-backed Salafi views has incentivized Muslim "schools, book publishers, magazines, newspapers, or even governments" around the world to "shape their behavior, speech, and thought in such a way as to incur and benefit from Saudi largesse." An example is the salary for "a Muslim scholar spending a six-month sabbatical" at a Saudi Arabian university, which is more than ten years of pay "teaching at the Azhar University in Egypt." Thus, acts such as "failing to veil" or failing to advocate veiling can mean the difference between "enjoying a decent standard of living or living in abject poverty."

Another incentive available to the Saudi Arabia, according to Abou el Fadl, is the power to grant or deny scholars a visa for hajj.

According to Khalid Abou el Fadl, books by alternative non-Saudi scholars of Salafism have been made scarce by Saudi government-approved Salafis who have discouraged distributing copies of their work. Examples of such authors are the Syrian Salafi scholar Rashid Rida, Yemeni jurist Muhammad al-Amir al-Husayni al-San'ani, and Muhammad Ibn Abd al-Wahhab's own brother and critic Sulayman Ibn Abd al-Wahhab.

One critic who suffered at the hands of Saudi-backed Wahhabi Salafists was an influential Salafi jurist, Muhammad al-Ghazali (d. 1996) who wrote a critique of the influence of Wahhabi Salafism upon the "Salafi creed"—its alleged "literalism, anti-rationalism, and anti-interpretive approach to Islamic texts". Despite the fact that al-Ghazali took care to use the term "Ahl al-Hadith", not "Wahhabi", the reaction to his book was "frantic and explosive", according to Abou el Fadl. Not only did a "large number" of "puritans" write to condemn al-Ghazali and "to question his motives and competence", but "several major" religious conferences were held in Egypt and Saudi Arabia to criticize the book, and the Saudi newspaper al-Sharq al-Awsat published "several long article responding to al-Ghazali." Saudi-backed Salafis "successfully preventing the republication of his work" even in his home country of Egypt, and "generally speaking made his books very difficult to locate."

==== Islamic banking ====
One mechanism for the redistribution of (some) oil revenues from Saudi Arabia and other Muslim oil exporters to the poorer Muslim nations of Africa and Asia was the Islamic Development Bank. Headquartered in Saudi Arabia, it opened for business in 1975. Its lenders and borrowers were member states of Organisation of the Islamic Conference (OIC) and it strengthened "Islamic cohesion" between them.

Saudi Arabians also helped establish Islamic banks with private investors and depositors. DMI (Dar al-Mal al-Islami: the House of Islamic Finance), founded in 1981 by Prince Mohammed bin Faisal Al Saud, and the Al Baraka group, established in 1982 by Sheik Saleh Abdullah Kamel (a Saudi billionaire), were both transnational holding companies.

By 1995, there were "144 Islamic financial institutions worldwide" (not all of them Saudi-financed), including 33 government-run banks, 40 private banks, and 71 investment companies. As of 2014, about $2 trillion of banking assets were "sharia-compliant".

==== Migration ====
By 1975, over one million workers—from unskilled country people to experienced professors, from Sudan, Pakistan, India, Southeast Asia, Egypt, Palestine, Lebanon, and Syria—had moved to Saudi Arabia and the Persian Gulf states to work, and return after a few years with savings. A majority of these workers were Arab and most were Muslim. Ten years later, the number had increased to 5.15 million and Arabs were no longer in the majority. 43% (mostly Muslims) came from the Indian subcontinent. In one country, Pakistan, in a single year, (1983),

"the money sent home by Gulf emigrants amounted to $3 billion, compared with a total of $735 million given to the nation in foreign aid. .... The underpaid petty functionary of yore could now drive back to his hometown at the wheel of a foreign car, build himself a house in a residential suburb, and settle down to invest his savings or engage in trade.... he owed nothing to his home state, where he could never have earned enough to afford such luxuries."

Muslims who had moved to Saudi Arabia, or other "oil-rich monarchies of the peninsula" to work, often returned to their poor home country following religious practice more intensely, particularly practices of Salafi Muslims. Having grown prosperous in a Salafi environment, it was not surprising that the returning Muslims believed there was a connection between a Salafu environment and its "material prosperity", and that on return, they followed religious practices more intensely and that those practices followed tenets of Salafi. Kepel gives examples of migrant workers returning home with new affluence, asking to be addressed by servants as "hajja" rather than "Madame" (the old bourgeois custom). Another imitation of Saudi Arabia adopted by affluent migrant workers was increased segregation of the sexes, including shopping areas. (It has also been suggested that Saudi Arabia has used cutbacks on the number of workers from a country allowed to work in it to punish a country for domestic policies it disapproves of.)

As of 2013, there are some 9 million registered foreign workers and at least a few million more illegal immigrants in Saudi Arabia, about half of the estimated 16 million citizens in the kingdom.

==== State leadership ====
In the 1950s and 1960s, Gamal Abdel Nasser, the leading exponent of Arab nationalism and the president of the Arab world's largest country, had great prestige and popularity among Arabs.

However, in 1967, Nasser led the Six-Day War against Israel which ended not in the elimination of Israel but in the decisive defeat of the Arab forces and loss of a substantial chunk of Egyptian territory. This defeat, combined with the economic stagnation from which Egypt suffered, were contrasted six years later with an embargo by the Arab "oil-exporting countries" against Israel's western allies that stopped Israel's counteroffensive, and Saudi Arabia great economic power. (Note: Another factor that contributed to bring Arab nationalism down was the perceived victory of the October 1973 war, whose Islamic battle cry of Allahu Akbar replaced Land! Sea! Air!, slogan of the disastrous 1967 war.)

This not only devastated Arab nationalism vis-à-vis the Islamic revival for the hearts and minds of Arab Muslims but changed "the balance of power among Muslim states", with Saudi Arabia and other oil-exporting countries gaining as Egypt lost influence. The oil exporters emphasized "religious commonality" among Arabs, Turks, Africans, and Asians, and downplayed "differences of language, ethnicity, and nationality." The Organisation of Islamic Cooperation—whose permanent Secretariat is located in Jeddah in Western Saudi Arabia—was founded after the 1967 war.

Saudi Arabia has expressed its displeasure with policies of poor Muslim countries by not hiring or expelling nationals from the country, thus denying them badly needed workers' remittances. In 2013, it punished the government of Bangladesh by lessening the number of Bangladeshis allowed to enter Saudi after a crackdown in Bangladesh on the Islamist Jamaat-e Islami party, which, according to The Economist magazine, "serves as a standard-bearer" for Saudi Arabia's "strand of Islam in Bangladesh". (In fiscal year 2012, Bangladesh received $3.7 billion in official remittances from Saudi Arabia, "which is quite a lot more than either receives in economic aid.")

==== Influence on Islamism ====
According to one source (Olivier Roy), the fusion/joint venture/hybridisation of the two Sunni movements (Salafiyya movement and Sunni Islamism) helped isolate Islamist Shia Islamic Republic of Iran, and move Islamism more towards fundamentalism or "neofundamentalism", where opposition to the West is "expressed in religious terms", i.e. "criticism of Christianity" and "marked anti-Semitism". In Afghanistan, for example, the Salafis circulated an anti-Shiite pamphlet titled Tuhfa-i ithna ashariyya (The gift of the twelver Shia) republished in Turkey in 1988 and widely distributed in Peshwar. In turn, articles and stories of how Salafism allegedly is "a creation of British imperialism" circulate in some Iranian circles. (Note: In March 1988 the Iranian newspaper Jumhuri-ye-islami published a series titled "The Wahhabis," in which Wahhabism was "defined not as a madhhab but as a heretical sect created and manipulated by the British secret services." (It had earlier published a similar series.))

=== Military jihad ===
During the 1980s and '90s, the monarchy and the clerics of Saudi Arabia helped to channel tens of millions of dollars to Sunni jihad fighters in Afghanistan, Bosnia and elsewhere. While apart from the Afghan jihad against the Soviets and perhaps the Taliban jihad, the jihads may not have worked to propagate conservative Islam, and the numbers of their participants was relatively small, they did have considerable impact.

==== Afghan jihad against Soviets ====
The Afghan jihad against the Soviet Army following the Soviet's December 1979 invasion of Kabul Afghanistan, has been called a "great cause with which Islamists worldwide identified," and the peak of Salafii-Islamist and Islamic Revivalist "collaboration and triumph." The Saudis spent several billion dollars (along with the United States and Pakistan), supported with "financing, weaponry, and intelligence" the native Afghan and "Afghan Arabs" mujahideen (fighters of jihad) fighting the Soviets and their Afghan allies. The Saudi government provided approximately $4 billion in aid to the mujahidin from 1980 to 1990 that went primarily to militarily ineffective but ideologically kindred Hezbi Islami and Ittehad-e Islami. Other funding for volunteers came from the Saudi Red Crescent, Muslim World League, and privately, from Saudi princes. At "training camps and religious schools (madrasa)" across the frontier in Pakistan—more than 100,000 Muslim volunteer fighters from 43 countries over the years—were provided with "radical, extremist indoctrination". Mujahidin training camps in Pakistan trained not just volunteers fighting the Soviets, but also Islamists returning to Kashmir (including the Kashmir Hizb-i Islami) and Philippine (Moros), among others. Among the foreign volunteers, there were more Saudi nationals than any other nationality in 2001, according to Jane's International Security. In addition to training and indoctrination, the war served as "a crucible for the synthesis of disparate Islamic revivalist organizations into loose coalition of likeminded jihadist groups that viewed the war" not as a struggle between freedom and foreign tyranny, but "between Islam and unbelief." The war turned jihadists from a "relatively insignificant" group into "a major force in the Muslim world."

The 1988–89 withdrawal by the Soviets from Afghanistan, leaving the Soviet-allied Afghan Marxists to their own fate, was interpreted by jihad fighters and supporters as "a sign of God's favor and the righteousness of their struggle." Afghan Arab volunteers returned from Afghanistan to join local Islamist groups in struggles against their allegedly "apostate" governments. Others went to fight jihad in places such as Bosnia, Chechnya and Kashmir. In at least one case, a former Soviet fighter – Jumma Kasimov of Uzbekistan—went on to fight jihad in his ex-Soviet Union state home, setting up the headquarters of his Islamic Movement of Uzbekistan in Taliban Afghanistan in 1997, and reportedly given millions of dollars' worth of aid by Osama bin Laden.

Saudi Arabia saw its support for jihad against the Soviets as a way to counter the Iranian Revolution—which initially generated considerable enthusiasm among Muslims—and contain its revolutionary, anti-monarchist influence (and also Shia influence in general) in the region. Its funding was also accompanied by Salafi literature and preachers who helped propagate the faith. With the help of Pakistani Deobandi groups, it oversaw the creation of new madrassas and mosques in Pakistan, which increased the influence of Sunni Salafi Islam in that country and prepare recruits for the jihad in Afghanistan.

==== Afghan Taliban ====
During the Soviet-Afghan War, Islamic schools (madrassas) for Afghan refugees in Pakistan appeared in the 1980s near the Afghan-Pakistan border. Initially funded by zakat donations from Pakistan, non-governmental organizations in Saudi Arabia and other Gulf states became "important backers" later on. Many were radical schools sponsored by the Pakistan JUI religious party and became "a supply line for jihad" in Afghanistan. According to analysts, the ideology of the schools became "hybridization" of the Deobandi school of the Pakistani sponsors and the Salafism supported by Saudi financers.

Several years after the Soviet withdrawal and fall of the Marxist government, many of these Afghan refugee students developed as a religious-political-military force to stop the civil war among Afghan mujahideen factions and unify (most of) the country under their "Islamic Emirate of Afghanistan". (Eight Taliban government ministers came from one school, Dar-ul-Uloom Haqqania.) While in power, the Taliban implemented the "strictest interpretation of Sharia law ever seen in the Muslim world," and was noted for its harsh treatment of women.

Saudis helped the Taliban in a number of ways. Saudi Arabia was one of only three countries (Pakistan and United Arab Emirates being the others) officially to recognize the Taliban as the official government of Afghanistan before the 9/11 attacks. (After 9/11, no country recognized it). King Fahd of Saudi Arabia "expressed happiness at the good measures taken by the Taliban and over the imposition of shari'a in our country," During a visit by the Taliban's leadership to the kingdom in 1997.

According to Pakistani journalist Ahmed Rashid, who spent much time in Afghanistan, in the mid-1990s, the Taliban asked Saudis for money and materials. Taliban leader Mullah Omar told Ahmed Badeeb, the chief of staff of the Saudi General Intelligence: "Whatever Saudi Arabia wants me to do, ... I will do". The Saudis in turn "provided fuel, money, and hundreds of new pickups to the Taliban ... Much of this aid was flown in to Kandahar from the Gulf port city of Dubai," according to Rashid. Another source, a witness to lawyers for the families of 9/11 victims, testified in a sworn statement that in 1998 he had seen an emissary for the director general of Al Mukhabarat Al A'amah, Saudi Arabia's intelligence agency prince, Turki bin Faisal Al Saud, hand a check for one billion Saudi riyals (approximately $267 million as of 10/2015) to a top Taliban leader in Afghanistan. (The Saudi government denies providing any funding and it is thought that the funding came not from the government but from wealthy Saudis and possibly other gulf Arabs who were urged to support the Taliban by the influential Saudi Grand Mufti Abd al-Aziz ibn Baz.) After the Taliban captured the Afghan capital Kabul, Saudi expat Osama bin Laden—who, though in very bad graces with the Saudi government, was very much influenced by Salafism or the Muslim Brotherhood-Salafiyya hybrid—provided the Taliban with funds, use of his training camps and veteran "Arab-Afghan forces for combat, and engaged in all-night conversations with the Taliban leadership.

Saudi Salafi practices, also influenced the Deobandi Taliban. One example was the Saudi religious police, according to Rashid.

I remember that all the Taliban who had worked or done hajj in Saudi Arabia were terribly impressed by the religious police and tried to copy that system to the letter. The money for their training and salaries came partly from Saudi Arabia.

The Taliban also practiced public beheadings, common in Saudi Arabia. Ahmed Rashid came across ten thousand men and children gathering at Kandahar football stadium one Thursday afternoon. Curious as to the cause for the gathering, as the Taliban had banned sports, he "went inside to discover a convicted murderer being led between the goalposts to be executed by a member of the victim's family."

The Taliban's brutal treatment of Shia, and the destruction of Buddhist statues in Bamiyan Valley, may also have been influenced by Salafism, which had a history of attacking Shia Muslims whom they considered heretics. In late July 1998, the Taliban used the trucks (donated by Saudis) mounted with machine guns to capture the northern town of Mazar-i-Sharif. "Ahmed Rashid later estimated that 6000 to 8000 Shia men, women and children were slaughtered in a rampage of murder and rape that included slitting people's throats and bleeding them to death, halal-style, and baking hundreds of victims into shipping containers without water to be baked alive in the desert sun." This reminded at least one writer (Dore Gold) of the Salafi attack on Shia shrine in Karbala in 1802.

Another activity Afghan Muslims had not engaged in before this time was destruction of statues. In 2001, the Taliban dynamited and rocketed the nearly 2,000-year-old statues Buddhist Bamiyan Valley, which had been undamaged by Afghan Sunni Muslim for centuries prior to then. Mullah Omar declared "Muslims should be proud of smashing idols. It has given praise to Allah that we have destroyed them."

=== Other jihads ===
From 1981 to 2006, an estimated 700 terror attacks outside of combat zones were perpetrated by Sunni extremists (usually Jihadi Salafis such as al-Qaeda), killing roughly 7,000 people. What connection, if any, there is between Wahhabism and Saudi Arabia on the one hand and Jihadi Salafis on the other hand is disputed. Allegations of Saudi links to terrorism "have been the subject of years" of U.S. "government investigations and furious debate". Wahhabism has been called "the fountainhead of Islamic extremism that promotes and legitimizes" violence against civilians (Yousaf Butt) In July 2013, the European Parliament identified Wahhabism as the main source of global terrorism.

Between the mid-1970s and 2002, Saudi Arabia provided over $70 billion in "overseas development aid", the vast majority of this development being religious, specifically the propagation and extension of the influence of Salafism at the expense of other forms of Islam. There has been an intense debate over whether Saudi aid and Salafism has fomented extremism in recipient countries. The two main ways in which Salafism and its funding is alleged to be connected to terror attacks are through

- Basic teachings. The Salafi doctrine of Al-Wala' wal Bara' encourages hatred towards non-Muslims. Insofar as those hated and found intolerable are subject to violence, Salafi teachings leads to violence. The interpretation is spread (among other ways) by textbooks in Saudi Arabia and in "thousands of schools worldwide funded by fundamentalist Sunni Muslim charities".
- Funding attacks. The Saudi government and Saudi charitable foundations which are run by Salafi institutions have directly or indirectly offered financial aide to terrorists and terrorist groups. According to at least one source (Anthony H. Cordesman), this flow of money from the Kingdom to outside extremist has "probably" had more effect than the kingdom's "religious thinking and missionary efforts". In addition to donations by sincere believers in jihadism working in the charities, money for terrorists also comes as a form of pay off to terrorist groups by some members of the Saudi ruling class in part to keep the jihadists from being more active in Saudi Arabia, according to critics. During the 1990s, al-Qaeda and Jihad Islamiyya (JI) filled leadership positions in several Islamic charities with some of their most trusted men (Abuza, 2003). Al-Qaeda and JI's operatives were then diverting about 15–20%, and in some cases, as much as 60% of the funds to finance their operations. Zachary Abuza estimates that the 300 private Islamic charities which have established their base of operations in Saudi Arabia have distributed over $10 billion worldwide "in support of an Salafi-Islamist agenda". Contributions from well-off and wealthy Saudis come from zakat, but contributions are often more like 10% rather than the obligatory 2.5% of their income-producing assets, and are followed up with minimal if any investigation of the contributions' results.

==== Funding before 2003 ====
American politicians and media have accused the Saudi government of supporting terrorism and tolerating a jihadist culture, noting that Osama bin Laden and fifteen out of the nineteen 9/11 hijackers were from Saudi Arabia.

In 2002, a Council on Foreign Relations Terrorist Financing Task Force report found that "For years, individuals and charities based in Saudi Arabia have been the most important source of funds for al-Qaeda. And for years, Saudi officials have turned a blind eye to this problem."

According to a 10 July 2002, briefing given to the U.S. Department of Defense Defense Policy Board, ("a group of prominent intellectuals and former senior officials that advises the Pentagon on defense policy") by a neoconservative (Laurent Murawiec, a RAND Corporation analyst), "The Saudis are active at every level of the terror chain, from planners to financiers, from cadre to foot-soldier, from ideologist to cheerleader,"

Some examples of funding are checks written by Princess Haifa bint Faisal—the wife of Prince Bandar bin Sultan, the Saudi ambassador to Washington—totaling as much as $73,000 ended up with Omar al-Bayoumi, a Saudi who hosted and otherwise helped two of the 11 September hijackers when they reached America. They imprisoned former al-Qaeda operative Zacarias Moussaoui, and stated in deposition transcripts filed in February 2015 that more than a dozen prominent Saudi figures (including Prince Turki al-Faisal Al Saud, a former Saudi intelligence chief) donated to al Qaeda in the late 1990s. Saudi officials have denied this.

Lawyers filing a lawsuit against Saudi Arabia for the families of 9/11 victims provided documents including

- an interview with a "self-described Qaeda operative in Bosnia" who said that the Saudi High Commission for Relief of Bosnia and Herzegovina, a charity "largely controlled by members of the royal family", provided "money and supplies to al-Qaeda" in the 1990s and "hired militant operatives" like himself.
- a "confidential German intelligence report" with "line-by-line" descriptions of bank transfers with "dates and dollar amounts" made in the early 1990s, indicating tens of millions of dollars were sent by Prince Salman bin Abdul Aziz (now King of Saudi Arabia) and other members of the Saudi royal family to a "charity that was suspected of financing militants' activities in Pakistan and Bosnia".

==== Post 2003 ====
In 2003, there were several attacks by al-Qaeda-connected terrorists on Saudi soil and according to American officials. In the decade since then, the Saudi government has become a "valuable partner against terrorism", assisting in the fight against al-Qaeda and the Islamic State.

However, there is some evidence Saudi support for terror continues. According to internal documents from the U.S. Treasury Department, the International Islamic Relief Organization (released by the aforementioned 9/11 family lawyers) – a prominent Saudi charity heavily supported by members of the Saudi royal family—showed "support for terrorist organizations" at least through 2006.

U.S. diplomatic cables released by WikiLeaks in 2010 contain numerous complaints of funding of Sunni extremists by Saudis and other Gulf Arabs. According to a 2009 U.S. State Department communication by then United States Secretary of State, Hillary Clinton, "donors in Saudi Arabia constitute the most significant source of funding to Sunni terrorist groups worldwide"—terrorist groups such as al-Qaeda, the Afghan Taliban, and Lashkar-e-Taiba in South Asia, for which "Saudi Arabia remains a critical financial support base". Part of this funding arises through the zakat charitable donations (one of the "Five Pillars of Islam") paid by all Saudis to charities, and amounting to at least 2.5% of their income. It is alleged that some of the charities serve as fronts for money laundering and terrorist financing operations, and further that some Saudis "know full well the terrorist purposes to which their money will be applied".

According to the U.S. cable, the problem is acute in Saudi Arabia, where militants seeking donations often come during the hajj season purporting to be pilgrims. This is "a major security loophole since pilgrims often travel with large amounts of cash and the Saudis cannot refuse them entry into Saudi Arabia". They also set up front companies to launder funds and receive money "from government-sanctioned charities". Clinton complained in the cable of the "challenge" of persuading "Saudi officials to treat terrorist funds emanating from Saudi Arabia as a strategic priority", and that the Saudis had refused to ban three charities classified by the U.S. as terrorist entities, despite the fact that, "Intelligence suggests" that the groups "at times, fund extremism overseas".

Besides Saudi Arabia, businesses based in the United Arab Emirates provide "significant funds" for the Afghan Taliban and their militant partners the Haqqani network, according to one U.S. embassy cable released by Wikileaks. According to a January 2010 U.S. intelligence report, "two senior Taliban fundraisers" had regularly travelled to the UAE, where the Taliban and Haqqani networks laundered money through local front companies. (The reports complained of weak financial regulation and porous borders in the UAE, but not difficulties in persuading UAE officials of terrorist danger.) Kuwait was described as a "source of funds and a key transit point" for al-Qaeda and other militant groups, whose government was concerned about terror attacks on its own soil, but "less inclined to take action against Kuwait-based financiers and facilitators plotting attacks" in our countries. Kuwait refused to ban the Society of the Revival of Islamic Heritage, which the U.S. had designated a terrorist entity in June 2008 for providing aid to al-Qaeda and affiliated groups, including LeT. According to the cables, "overall level" of counterterror co-operation with the U.S. was "considered the worst in the region". More recently, in late 2014, U.S. Vice President Joe Biden also complained "the Saudis, the Emirates" had "poured hundreds of millions of dollars and tens of tons of weapons" into Syria for "al-Nusra, and al-Qaeda, and the extremist elements of jihadis."

In October 2014, Zacarias Moussaoui, an al-Qaeda member imprisoned in the U.S. testified under oath that members of the Saudi royal family supported al Qaeda. According to Moussaoui, he was tasked by Osama bin Laden with creating a digital database to catalog al Qaeda's donors, and that donors he entered into the database including several members of the Saudi royal family, including Prince Turki al-Faisal Al Saud, former director-general of Saudi Arabia's Foreign Intelligence Service and ambassador to the United States, and others he named in his testimony. Saudi government representatives have denied the charges. According to the 9/11 Commission Report, while it is possible that charities with significant Saudi government sponsorship diverted funds to al-Qaeda, and "Saudi Arabia has long been considered the primary source of al Qaeda funding, ... we have found no evidence that the Saudi government as an institution or senior Saudi officials individually funded the organization."

As of 2014, "deep-pocket donors and charitable organizations" in the Arabian gulf, are still providing "millions of dollars worth of aid to Al Qaeda and other terrorist organizations, according to David S. Cohen, the U.S. Department of Treasury's Under Secretary for Terrorism and Financial Intelligence at the time.

==== Teachings ====
Among those who believe there is, or may be, a connection between Wahhabi movement and al-Qaeda include F. Gregory Gause III Roland Jacquard, and Rohan Gunaratna.

Among those critics who allege that Salafi influence continues to created ideological "narrative" helpful to extremist violence (if not al-Qaeda specifically) is U.S. scholar Farah Pandith (an adjunct senior fellow at the Council on Foreign Relations) who "traveled to 80 countries between 2009 and 2014 as the first ever U.S. special representative to Muslim communities."

In each place I visited, the Wahhabi influence was an insidious presence, changing the local sense of identity; displacing historic, culturally vibrant forms of Islamic practice; and pulling along individuals who were either paid to follow their rules or who became on their own custodians of the Wahhabi world view. Funding all this was Saudi money, which paid for things like the textbooks, mosques, TV stations and the training of Imams.

Dore Gold says that bin Laden was not only given a Salafi education, but among other pejoratives accused his target—the United States—of being "the Hubal of the age", in need of destruction. Focus on Hubal, the seventh-century stone idol, follows the Salafi focus on the importance of the need to destroy any and all idols.

Biographers of Khalid Shaikh Mohammed ("architect" of the 9/11 attacks) and Ramzi Yousef (leader of the 1993 World Trade Center bombing that Yousef hoped would topple the North Tower, killing tens of thousands of office workers) have noted the influence of Salafism through Ramzi Yousef's father, Muhammad Abdul Karim, who was introduced to Salafism in the early 1980s while working in Kuwait.

Others connect the group to Sayyid Qutb and Political Islam. Academic Natana J. DeLong-Bas, senior research assistant at the Prince Alwaleed Center for Muslim-Christian Understanding at Georgetown University, argues that though bin Laden "came to define Wahhabi Islam during the later years" of his life, his militant Islam "was not representative of Wahhabi Islam as it is practiced in contemporary Saudi Arabia" Karen Armstrong states that Osama bin Laden, like most Islamic extremists, followed the ideology of Sayyid Qutb, not "Wahhabism".

Noah Feldman distinguishes between what he calls the "deeply conservative Wahhabis" and what he calls the "followers of political Islam in the 1980s and 1990s," such as Egyptian Islamic Jihad and later al-Qaeda leader Ayman al-Zawahiri. While Saudi Wahhabis were "the largest funders of local Muslim Brotherhood chapters and other hard-line Islamists" during this time, they opposed jihadi resistance to Muslim governments and assassination of Muslim leaders because of their belief that "the decision to wage jihad lay with the ruler, not the individual believer".

More recently, the self-declared "Islamic State" in Iraq and Syria headed by Abu Bakr al-Baghdadi has been described as both more violent than al-Qaeda and more closely aligned with Wahhabism.

For their guiding principles, the leaders of the Islamic State, also known as ISIS or ISIL, are open and clear about their almost exclusive commitment to the Wahhabi movement of Sunni Islam. The group circulates images of Wahhabi religious textbooks from Saudi Arabia in the schools it controls. Videos from the group's territory have shown Wahhabi texts plastered on the sides of an official missionary van. (Note: see also "When ISIS began setting up schools to teach the next generation of jihadis, the terror group didn't have to start from scratch on its curricula. Instead, its members took to the Internet, downloading PDFs of textbooks that had been posted online by Saudi Arabia's ministry of education and that preached hatred for anyone who's not a follower of the ultra-conservative Wahhabi branch of Islam.)

ISIS eventually published its own books, and out of the twelve works by Muslim scholars it republished, seven were by Muhammad ibn Abd al-Wahhab, the founder of Wahhabism. Sheikh Adil al-Kalbani, a former imam of the Grand Mosque of Mecca, told a television interviewer in January 2016 that the Islamic State leaders "draw their ideas from what is written in our own books, our own principles."

Scholar Bernard Haykel states that Wahhabism is the Islamic State's "closest religious cognate," and that "for Al Qaeda, violence is a means to an ends; for ISIS, it is an end in itself." An anonymous scholar with "long experience in Saudi Arabia", quoted by Scott Shane, describes Saudi preaching as sometimes causing a "recalibrating of the religious center of gravity" for young people, making it "easier for them to swallow or make sense of the ISIS religious narrative when it does arrive. It doesn't seem quite as foreign as it might have, had that Saudi religious influence not been there."

According to former British intelligence officer Alastair Crooke, ISIS "is deeply Wahhabist", but also "a corrective movement to contemporary Wahhabism." In Saudi Arabia itself, according to Crooke, the

ruling elite is divided. Some applaud that ISIS is fighting Iranian Shiite "fire" with Sunni "fire"; that a new Sunni state is taking shape at the very heart of what they regard as a historical Sunni patrimony; and they are drawn by Da'ish's strict Salafist ideology.

Former CIA director James Woolsey described Saudi as "the soil in which Al-Qaeda and its sister terrorist organizations are flourishing." However, the Saudi government strenuously denies these claims or that it exports religious or cultural extremism.

==== Individual Saudi nationals ====
Saudi intelligence sources estimate that from 1979 to 2001, as many as 25,000 Saudis received military training in Afghanistan and other locations abroad, and many helped in jihad outside of the Kingdom.

According to Saudi analyst Ali al-Ahmed, "more than 6,000 Saudi nationals" have been recruited into al-Qaeda armies in Iraq, Pakistan, Syria, and Yemen "since the Sept. 11 attacks". In Iraq, an estimated 3,000 Saudi nationals, "the majority of foreign fighters", were fighting alongside Al Qaeda in Iraq.

== Debate about the impact of propagation on Salafi-jihadist insurgencies ==
According to U.S. Army Colonel Thomas F. Lynch III, Sunni Jihadists perpetrated about 700 terror attacks killing roughly 7,000 people; while Shi'a extremists carried out 158 terror attacks causing the deaths of about 3,000 people, between 1981 and 2006. An evaluation of Sunni versus Shi'a terrorist attacks in the period 1981-2006 by Brookings Institution found that:

Sunni terrorism in noncombat zones evolved in four overlapping waves. Conducted by hundreds of ideologically similar groups, Sunni terrorism has featured continuous, mid‐to‐high intensity operations viewing war against infidels and apostates as a perpetual condition. Terrorism by Shi'a groups in non‐combat zones over the same period has been conducted in five discrete campaigns and by two main actors: Iranian state agents from special national paramilitary and intelligence services, and Hezbollah operatives. The rationale for terrorism by Shi'a groups over that time frame was tethered tightly to Iranian state and Hezbollah organizational objectives, especially that of state/group survival.

What connection there is between Wahhabism proper and the ideology of Salafi jihadists such as al-Qaeda who carry out these attacks has been disputed. According to many Islamists, bin Laden and his followers did not identify themselves as Wahhabists. Bin Laden identified as a Salafist, but that is not necessarily synonymous with Wahhabism in its entirety. Moreover, the Wahhabi ulema of Saudi Arabia had ruled the illegality of all forms of suicide bombings, including in Israel. The doctrine of suicide bombings which was justified by Zawahiri in his legal treatises were rejected as heretical by the Wahhabi scholars.

=== Bin Laden's conflict with the Saudi government ===
As early as 1988, the Board of Senior Ulema (BSU) of the Dar al-Ifta in Saudi Arabia, composed of influential scholars like Muhammad ibn al-Uthaymeen (d. 2001) and Ibn Baz (d. 1999), had issued strong condemnation of various acts of terrorism. In a comprehensive fatwa issued at its 32nd session in Ta'if on 25 August 1988, the board members recommended the death penalty for acts of terrorism. However, Ibn al-Uthaymeen had previously supported a position in which he permitted attacks on women and children by classifying them as "retaliation", a position which was contrary to classical Sunni thought. He later retracted this position. The Yemeni origins of the bin Laden family also reflected a non-Wahhabi heritage.

Bin Laden's feud with the Saudi government intensified during the Gulf War, prompting Saudi authorities to place bin Laden under house arrest in 1991, before exiling him the same year. In 1994, Saudi Arabia revoked bin Laden's citizenship and froze all his assets, turning him into a fugitive and the bin Laden family disowned him. After Saudi pressure on Sudan, the al-Qaeda leader sought refuge under the Taliban government in Afghanistan. Taliban's denial of Saudi requests to extradite bin Laden led to a diplomatic row between Afghanistan and Saudi Arabia. Throughout the 1990s, mainstream Wahhabi clerics in the Kingdom supported U.S.-Saudi alliance against Ba'athist Iraq during the Gulf War and condemned terrorist acts by al-Qaeda. Anti-establishment Wahhabi scholars have also been vehemently opposed to tactics advocated by bin Laden, not withstanding their opposition to American foreign policy in West Asia.

=== Post-9/11 debates in the U.S. ===
The neoconservative Lulu Schwartz (then known by the name Stephen Schwartz) presented an alternative view that argued for Wahhabi connections to al-Qaeda. In June 2003, when the FBI had listed al-Qaeda as "the number one terrorist threat to the United States", Lulu Schwartz and then U.S. Republican Senator and lobbyist Jon Kyl claimed before the Subcommittee on Terrorism, Technology, and Homeland Security of the U.S. Senate that "Wahhabism is the source of the overwhelming majority of terrorist atrocities in today's world". (Note: Journalists and experts, as well as spokespeople of the world, have said that Wahhabism is the source of the overwhelming majority of terrorist atrocities in today's world, from Morocco to Indonesia, via Israel, Saudi Arabia, Chechnya. [...] To examine the role of Wahhabism and terrorism is not to label all Muslims as extremists [...] Analyzing Wahhabism means identifying the extreme element that, although enjoying immense political and financial resources, thanks to support by a sector of the Saudi state, seeks to globally hijack Islam [...] The extremist ideology is Wahhabism, a major force behind terrorist groups, like al Qaeda.) Scholar F. Gregory Gause strongly opposed such sweeping assertions made by war hawks in the Bush administration, contrasting such portrayals of Wahhabism with attempts made by far-right militants to appropriate American patriotism. Gause states:

"Wahhabism has been the official interpretation of Islam in the Saudi domain since the founding of the modern state at the outset of the twentieth century. It has not been a barrier to a very close Saudi-American relationship over the past decades... Wahhabism, as it has developed in Saudi Arabia, is a state ideology, not a revolutionary creed... Wahhabism's official arbiters counsel loyalty to the ruler, not revolution...Those who advocate "regime change" in Riyadh, through greater democracy or direct U.S. action, can offer no assurances that a new regime would be any friendlier to the United States."

American scholar Natana J. DeLong-Bas, senior research assistant at the Prince Alwaleed Center for Muslim-Christian Understanding at Georgetown University, argues:

The militant Islam of Osama bin Laden did not have its origins in the teachings of Ibn Abd-al-Wahhab and was not representative of Wahhabi Islam as it is practiced in contemporary Saudi Arabia, yet for the media it came to define Wahhabi Islam during the later years of bin Laden's lifetime. However "unrepresentative" bin Laden's global jihad was of Islam in general and Wahhabi Islam in particular, its prominence in headline news took Wahhabi Islam across the spectrum from revival and reform to global jihad.

American academic and author Noah Feldman distinguishes between what he calls the "deeply conservative" Wahhabis and what he calls the "followers of political Islam in the 1980s and 1990s", such as Egyptian Islamic Jihad and later al-Qaeda leader Ayman al-Zawahiri. While Saudi Wahhabis were "the largest funders of local Muslim Brotherhood chapters and other hard-line Islamists" during this time, they opposed jihadi resistance to Muslim governments and assassination of Muslim leaders because of their belief that "the decision to wage jihad lay with the ruler, not the individual believer". In 2005, British author and religion academic Karen Armstrong declared that "Bin Laden was not inspired by Wahhabism but by the writings of the Egyptian ideologue Sayyid Qutb, who was executed by President Nasser in 1966. Almost every fundamentalist movement in Sunni Islam has been strongly influenced by Qutb, so there is a good case for calling the violence that some of his followers commit "Qutbian terrorism"."

=== Similarities and differences between Salafists and the Islamic State ===
More recently, the self-declared "Islamic State" (IS) in Iraq and Syria which was originally led by Abu Bakr al-Baghdadi has been described as both more violent than al-Qaeda and more closely aligned with Wahhabism, alongside Salafism and Salafi jihadism. According to The New York Times correspondent David D. Kirkpatrick, the leadership of the Islamic State publicly espouses their adherence to Wahhabi movement in their "guiding principles". Kirkpatrick reported that IS disseminated pictures of Saudi religious curriculum in its educational centres, while Saudi Arabia and its Gulf allies were simultaneously bombing IS military bases in Syria during the War against Islamic State.

According to the American historian of Islam Bernard Haykel, "for Al Qaeda, violence is a means to an end; for ISIS, it is an end in itself." Wahhabism is the Islamic State's "closest religious cognate". IS represented the ideological amalgamation of various elements of Qutbism and 20th-century Egyptian Islamism and the doctrines of Wahhabi movement. While the Muwahhidun movement had shunned violent rebellion against governments, IS embraces political call to revolutions. While, historically, Wahhabis were not champions of the idea of caliphate, the Islamic State vigorously fights for the restoration of a pan-Islamist global caliphate. Unlike the Islamic State ideologues who used the Qur'anic Āyah (verses) which pertain to Jihad as a justification for their aggressive fight against all non-Muslims; Ibn 'Abd al-Wahhab interpreted those Āyah as calling for a defensive endeavour, with an additional emphasis on safeguarding the lives of non-combatants in scenarios of warfare. Furthermore, he had advocated cordial relations with non-Muslims to soften their hearts towards Islam, adopting a persuasive approach to conversions.

According to the American scholar Cole Bunzel, Arabist and historian specialized in Near Eastern studies, "The religious character of the Islamic State is, without doubt, overwhelmingly Wahhabi, but the group does depart from Wahhabi tradition in four critical respects: dynastic alliance, the caliphate, violence, and apocalyptic fervor". Islamic State's apocalyptic interpretation of hadiths related to end times represents a significant break from the political discourse of the historical Saudi-Wahhabi states. IS eschatological narrative also departs from the religious doctrines of the Muwahhidun scholars; who categorised the knowledge of the end times strictly within the realm of Al-Ghayb, affairs known only to God. IS does not follow the pattern of the first three Saudi-Wahhabi states in integrating its religious mission with the Saudi monarchy; rather, they consider them apostates. The pan-Islamist call for a global caliphate is another departure from Wahhabism. Theoretical elaboration of Khilafah (Caliphate) system is noticeably absent in pre-20th-century Wahhabi treatises. Ironically, Saudi States had conflicts with the Ottoman Empire throughout the 19th century, the sole Muslim dynasty that had claimed to represent the institution of Caliphate. Despite their hostilities, the Wahhabis never declared a counter-caliphate. Other scholars have postulated that Salafi-jihadist ideologues employ a strategy of exploiting the works of Ibn Taymiyya and Ibn 'Abd al-Wahhab to cement legitimacy for their campaigns in the Muslim World. By applying Ibn Taymiyya's fatwas, militant Jihadists seek to interlink the modern era with the medieval age when the Islamic World was under constant attack by Crusaders.

Although religious violence was not absent in the Emirate of Diriyah, the Islamic State's displays of beheading, immolation, and other brutal acts of extreme violence which are aimed at instilling psychological terror in the general population have no parallels in Saudi history. They were introduced by Abu Musab al-Zarqawi, founding leader of al-Qaeda in Iraq, who took inspiration from the writings of Abu Abdullah al-Muhajir, an Egyptian Jihadist theoretician and ideologue identified as the key theorist and ideologue behind modern jihadist violence. It was the Al-Muhajir's legal manual on violence, popularly known as Fiqh al-Dima (The Jurisprudence of Jihad or The Jurisprudence of Blood), that is ISIL's standard reference for justifying its extraordinary acts of violence. The book has been described by counterterrorism scholar Orwa Ajjoub as rationalizing and justifying "suicide operations, the mutilation of corpses, beheading, and the killing of children and non-combatants". His theological and legal justifications influenced ISIL, al-Qaeda, and Boko Haram, as well as several other jihadi terrorist groups. The burning alive of Jordanian pilot Muath al-Kasasbeh in 2015, one of the most infamous acts of IS, was condemned by the Grand Mufti of Saudi Arabia as a "horrendous crime" that violated all Islamic principles. The IS doctrinal views on theological concepts like Hakimiyya and Takfir are also alien to the historical and contemporary Wahhabi understandings.

=== Classical Wahhabi views on Jihad ===
In contrast to the Jihadist ideologues of the 20th and 21st centuries, Muhammad Ibn 'Abd al-Wahhab had defined jihad as an activity that must have a valid religious justification and which can only be declared by an Imam whose purpose must be strictly defensive in nature. Various contemporary militant Jihadist groups theorize their warfare as a global endeavour for expanding the territories of Islam (Dar al-islam) and Muslim control and believe it to be an ongoing, permanent duty of the Muslim community for the purpose of extinguishing "unbelief". Another objective is overthrowing the ruling governments in the Muslim world, which they regard as apostates, and replacing them with "Islamic states". However, Ibn ʿAbd al-Wahhāb had maintained that the military campaigns of the Emirate of Dirʿiyya were strictly defensive and rebuked his opponents as being the first to initiate Takfir. Justifying the Wahhabi military campaigns as defensive operations against their enemies, Ibn 'Abd al-Wahhab asserts:

"As for warfare, until today, we did not fight anyone, except in defense of our lives and honor. They came to us in our area and did not spare any effort in fighting us. We only initiated fighting against some of them in retaliation for their continued aggression, [The recompense for an evil is an evil like thereof] (42:40)... they are the ones who started declaring us to be unbelievers and fighting us"

Moreover, the excesses committed by the newly recruited soldiers of Emirate of Diriyah had been rebuked by the scholarly leadership of the Wahhabi movement who took care to condemn and religiously delegitimise such war crimes. Condemning the military excesses committed during the Wahhabi conquest of Mecca in 1218–1803, Abdullah ibn Muhammad Aal Ash-Shaykh (1751–1829 C.E/ 1164–1244 A.H) stated:

"As for the fact that some Bedouins destroyed books belonging to the people of Ta'if it was committed by the ignorant, who were admonished, along with others, from repeating this and similar actions. The stance that we take is that we do not take Arabs as captives and will not practice that in the future. We did not initiate hostilities against non-Arabs either, and we do not agree to killing of women and children."

== See also ==
- International propagation of the Salafi movement and Wahhabism by region
- Capitalism and Islam
- History of Islam
  - Spread of Islam
- Islam and other religions
- Islam and violence
  - Islam and war
  - Islamic terrorism
  - Jihad
    - Jihadism
- Islam in Iran
  - Khomeinism
- Islam in Saudi Arabia
  - Wahhabism
- Islamism
- Islamic fundamentalism
- Islamic schools and branches
  - Persecution of minority Muslim groups
  - Shia–Sunni relations
    - Iran-Saudi Arabia conflict
  - Sufi–Salafi relations
- Muslim World League
- Petro-Islam
- Political Islam
  - Political aspects of Islam
- Presidency of Religious Affairs of the Turkish government that directs more than 2,000 mosques in 38 countries
- Salafi movement
  - Salafi jihadism
