= Islamic extremism =

Extreme or radical form of Islam

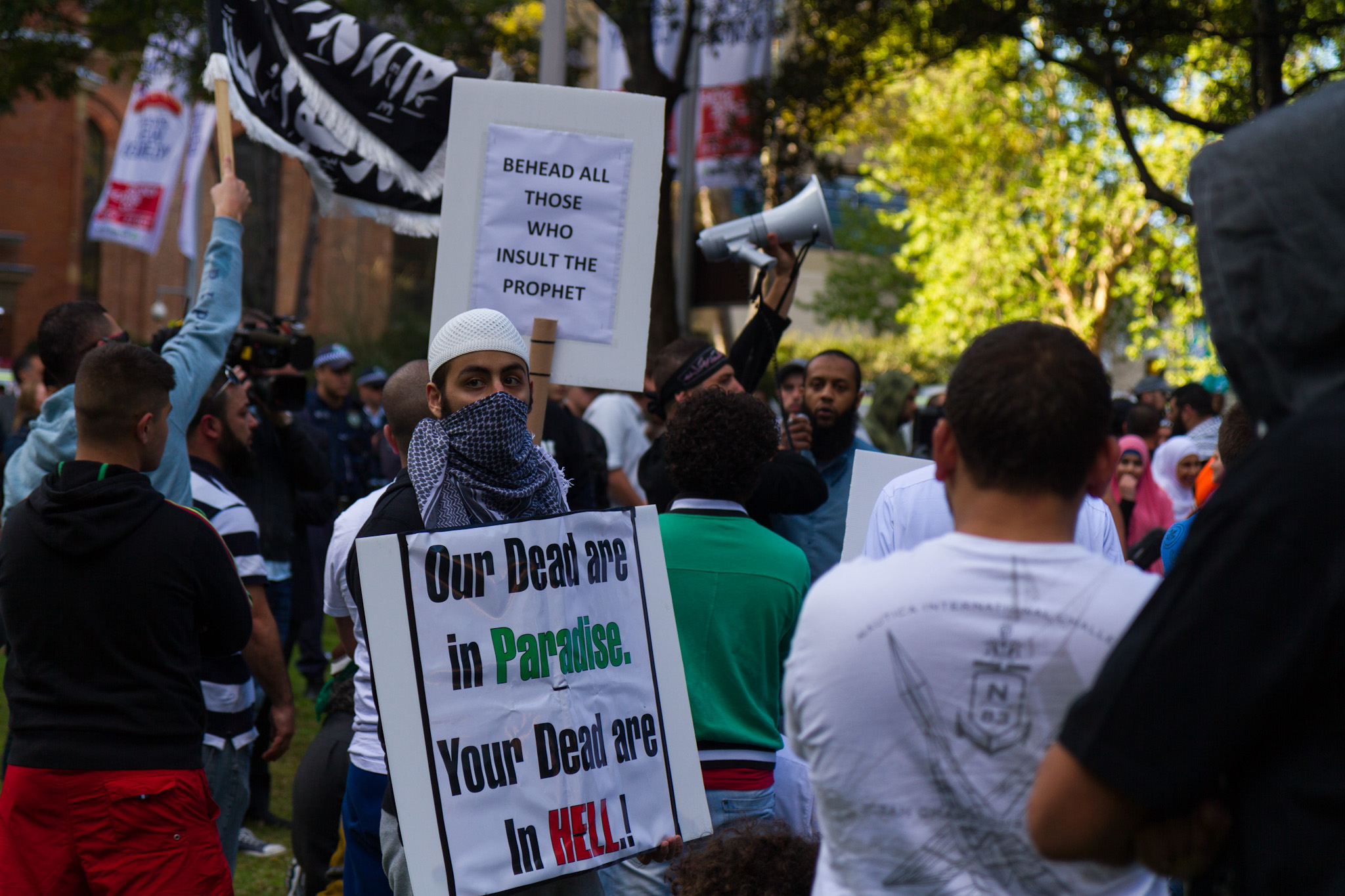
Muslim protest against the anti-Islamic film Innocence of Muslims in Sydney, 15 September 2012. The protesters carry signs reading "Behead all those who insult the Prophet" and "Our dead are in Paradise. Your dead are in HELL!"

Islamic extremism is characterised by extremist beliefs, behaviours, and ideologies adhered to by some Muslims within Islam. The term "Islamic extremism" is contentious, encompassing a spectrum of definitions, ranging from academic interpretations of Islamic supremacy to the notion that all ideologies other than Islam have failed and are inferior. Islamic extremism is different from Islamic fundamentalism or Islamism. Islamic fundamentalism refers to a movement among Muslims advocating a return to the fundamental principles of an Islamic state in Muslim-majority countries. Meanwhile, Islamism constitutes a form of political Islam. However, both Islamic fundamentalism and Islamism have also been classified as subsets of Islamic extremism by some. Acts of violence committed by Islamic terrorists and jihadists are associated with these extremist beliefs, while many Muslims see extremists as not following Islam. The term "Islamism" has been criticised as having been given connotations of violence, extremism, and violations of human rights, by the Western mass media, leading to Islamophobia and stereotyping. During the Cold War following World War II, the United States and the United Kingdom launched covert and overt campaigns to encourage and strengthen Islamic fundamentalist groups in the Middle East, North Africa, and southern Asia. These groups were seen as a hedge against potential expansion by the Soviet Union, and as a counterweight against nationalist and socialist movements that were seen as a threat to the interests of the Western nations. In a 2018 interview with The Washington Post, Mohammed bin Salman, the de facto ruler of Saudi Arabia, said that Saudi Arabia's International propagation of the Salafi movement and Wahhabism campaign "was rooted in the Cold War, when allies asked Saudi Arabia to use its resources to prevent inroads in Muslim countries by the Soviet Union." According to some estimates, between the 1960s and 2016, Saudi Arabia funnelled over US$100 billion to spread Wahhabi Islam. According to political scientist Alex Alexiev, the impetus for the international propagation of Salafism and Wahhabism was "the largest worldwide propaganda campaign ever mounted", David A. Kaplan described it as "dwarfing the Soviets' propaganda efforts at the height of the Cold War". In 2013, the European Parliament identified Wahhabism as the main source of global terrorism.

== Definitions ==
=== Academic definition ===
The academic definition of radical Islam consists of two parts:

- Islamic thought that states that all ideologies other than Islam, whether associated with the West (capitalism or democracy) or the East (communism or socialism), have failed and demonstrated their bankruptcy.
- Islamic thought that states that (semi-)secular regimes are wrong because of their negligence of Islam.

=== UK High Court definition ===
The UK High Court has ruled in two cases on Islamic extremism and provided definitions.

Aside from those, two major definitions have been offered for Islamic extremism, incorporating overlapping yet distinct aspects of extreme interpretations and pursuits of Islamic ideology:

- The use of violent tactics such as bombings and assassinations for achieving perceived Islamic goals (see Jihadism; Zeyno Baran, Senior Fellow and Director of the Center for Eurasian Policy at the Hudson Institute, prefers the term Islamist extremism).
- An extremely conservative view of Islam, which does not necessarily entail violence (see also Islamic fundamentalism; Baran again prefers the term Islamism).

In 2019, the United States Institute of Peace issued a report on extremism in fragile states, advocating the establishment of a shared understanding, an operational framework for prevention, and international cooperation.

== Key influences of radical Islam ==
=== Early Islam ===
According to the academic definition of radical Islam, the second condition for something to be designated radical Islam is that it is anti-governmental. Consequently, the presence of a government is a prerequisite. Although the Peace of Westphalia established in 1648 introduced the concept of the nation-state, the writings from the formative centuries of Islamic history remain influential to contemporary writings considered radical in the modern Muslim world. Key influences stemming from early Islam include:

==== Kharijites ====
Islamic extremism dates back to the early history of Islam with the emergence of the Kharijites in the 7th century CE. The original schism between Kharijites, Sunnīs, and Shīʿas arose over the political and religious succession to the leadership of the Muslim community (Ummah) following the death of the Islamic prophet Muhammad. From their essentially political stance, the Kharijites developed extreme doctrines that set them apart from both mainstream Sunnī and Shīʿa Muslims. Shīʿas believe ʿAlī ibn Abī Ṭālib was the true successor to Muhammad, while Sunnīs consider Abu Bakr to hold that position. The Kharijites broke away from both groups during the First Fitna (the first Islamic Civil War); they were particularly noted for adopting a radical approach to takfīr (excommunication), declaring both Sunnī and Shīʿa Muslims to be either infidels (kuffār) or false Muslims (munāfiḳūn), and deeming them worthy of death for perceived apostasy (ridda).

Islamic tradition traces the origin of the Kharijites to the battle between ʿAlī and Mu'awiya at Siffin in 657 CE. When ʿAlī faced a military stalemate and agreed to submit the dispute to arbitration, some members of his party withdrew their support. "Judgement belongs to God alone" (لاَ حُكْمَ إلَا لِلّهِ) became the slogan of these secessionists. They also referred to themselves as al-Shurat ("the Vendors"), reflecting their willingness to give their lives in martyrdom.

These early Kharijites opposed both ʿAlī and Mu'awiya and appointed their own leaders. They were decisively defeated by ʿAlī, who was later assassinated by a Kharijite. Kharijites subsequently engaged in guerrilla warfare against the Umayyads, becoming a major force during the Second Fitna (the second Islamic Civil War), when they temporarily controlled more territory than any of their rivals. They presented a significant challenge to Ibn al-Zubayr's bid for the caliphate, controlling Yamama and most of southern Arabia, and capturing the oasis town of al-Ta'if.

The Azariqa, considered the most extreme Kharijite faction, controlled parts of western Iran under the Umayyads until their defeat in 699 CE. The more moderate Ibadi Kharijites lasted longer, continuing to hold political influence in North and East Africa and eastern Arabia during the 'Abbasid period. Because of their readiness to declare opponents apostates, extreme Kharijite factions frequently fragmented into small groups. A key consensus among these splinter groups was their view of the caliphate, which diverged from other Islamic theories on two primary points:

- First, they were principled egalitarians, maintaining that any pious Muslim ("even an Ethiopian slave") could become caliph, and that family or tribal lineage was irrelevant. The sole criteria for leadership were personal piety and communal acceptance.
- Second, they maintained that believers had a duty to depose any leader who fell into error. Applying these principles to early Islamic history, Kharijites recognised only Abu Bakr and 'Umar as legitimate caliphs; of 'Uthman's rule, they accepted only the first six years, while rejecting 'Ali entirely.

By the time Ibn al-Muqaffa' composed his political treatise early in the 'Abbasid era, the Kharijites were no longer a primary political threat in the Islamic heartlands. However, the memory of their challenge to unity and their ideological radicalism continued to influence Islamic political and religious thought. The Ibadis represent the only Kharijite branch surviving into modern times.

==== Ottoman Empire ====
The Kadızadelis (also Qādīzādali) were a seventeenth-century puritanical reform movement in the Ottoman Empire following Kadızade Mehmed (1582–1635), a revivalist preacher. Kadızade and his followers were staunch opponents of Sufism and popular religious practices. They condemned various Ottoman traditions as bidʻah ("non-Islamic innovations") and advocated "reviving the beliefs and practices of the first Muslim generation in the first/seventh century" ("enjoining good and forbidding wrong").

Driven by impassioned rhetoric, Kadızade Mehmed attracted numerous followers seeking to eliminate perceived corruption across the Ottoman Empire. Movement leaders held official posts as preachers in major mosques in Baghdad, combining popular support with backing from within the state apparatus. Between 1630 and 1680, violent clashes occurred between the Kadızadelis and their opponents. As the movement developed, adherents entered "mosques, tekkes and Ottoman coffeehouses in order to mete out punishments to those contravening their version of orthodoxy."

=== Modern Islam ===
==== Salafism and Wahhabism ====
The Salafiyya movement is a conservative, Islahi (reform) movement within Sunnī Islam that emerged in the second half of the 19th century and advocates a return to the traditions of the "devout ancestors" (Salaf al-Salih). It has been described as the "fastest-growing Islamic movement", with scholars expressing diverse views across social, theological, and political spectra. Salafis follow a doctrine that can be summed up as taking "a fundamentalist approach to Islam, emulating the Prophet Muhammad and his earliest followers—al-salaf al-salih, the 'pious forefathers'....They reject religious innovation, or bidʻah, and support the implementation of Sharia (Islamic law)." The Salafi movement is often divided into three categories: the largest group are the purists (or quietists), who avoid politics; the second largest group are the militant activists, who get involved in politics; the third and smallest group are the jihadists, who constitute a minority. Most violent Islamist groups stem from the Salafi-jihadist movement and its subgroups. In recent years, jihadi-Salafist doctrines have often been associated with armed insurgencies and terrorist organisations targeting civilians, both Muslims and non-Muslims, such as al-Qaeda, ISIL/ISIS, and Boko Haram. The second-largest group, the Salafi activists, has a long tradition of political involvement, including within organisations such as the Muslim Brotherhood. In the aftermath of wide-scale repression following the Arab Spring, accompanied by political setbacks, activist Salafi movements experienced a decline. The quietists, representing the largest segment, advocate political disengagement and maintain allegiance to established rulers to avoid fitna (chaos).

The Wahhabi movement was founded by the Hanbali scholar and theologian Muhammad ibn Abd al-Wahhab, a religious preacher from the Najd region in the Arabian Peninsula, and was instrumental in the rise of the House of Saud to power in the Arabian Peninsula. Ibn ʿAbd al-Wahhab sought to revive and purify Islam from what he perceived as non-Islamic popular religious beliefs and practices by returning to what he believed were the fundamental principles of the Islamic religion. His works were generally short, full of quotations from the Quran and Hadith literature, such as his main theological treatise, Kitāb at-Tawḥīd (Arabic: كتاب التوحيد; "The Book of Oneness"). He taught that the primary doctrine of Islam was the uniqueness and oneness of God (tawḥīd), and denounced what he held to be popular religious practices akin to heretical innovation (bidʿah) and polytheism (shirk).

Wahhabism has been described as a conservative, strict, and fundamentalist branch of Sunnī Islam, with puritan views, believing in a literal interpretation of the Quran. The terms "Wahhabism" and "Salafism" are sometimes invoked interchangeably, although the designation "Wahhabi" is specifically applied to the followers of Muhammad ibn ʿAbd al-Wahhab and his reformist doctrines. The label "Wahhabi" was not claimed by his followers, who usually refer to themselves as al-Muwaḥḥidūn ("affirmers of the singularity of God"), but is rather employed by Western scholars and critics. Starting in the mid-1970s and 1980s, the international propagation of Salafism and Wahhabism within Sunnī Islam, favoured by the Kingdom of Saudi Arabia and other Arab states of the Persian Gulf, achieved what French political scientist Gilles Kepel defined as a "preeminent position of strength in the global expression of Islam."

Twenty-two months after the September 11 attacks, when the FBI considered al-Qaeda "the number one terrorist threat to the United States", journalist Stephen Schwartz and U.S. Senator Jon Kyl stated during a June 2003 hearing before the Subcommittee on Terrorism, Technology, and Homeland Security of the U.S. Senate that "Wahhabism is the source of the overwhelming majority of terrorist atrocities in today's world". As part of the global "War on terror", Wahhabism has been described by the European Parliament, Western security analysts, and think tanks such as the RAND Corporation as "a source of global terrorism". Furthermore, Wahhabism has been accused of causing division within the Muslim community (Ummah) and criticised for its followers' destruction of historic sites associated with the early history of Islam and the first generation of Muslims (Muhammad's family and his companions) in Saudi Arabia.

=== Contemporary Islam ===
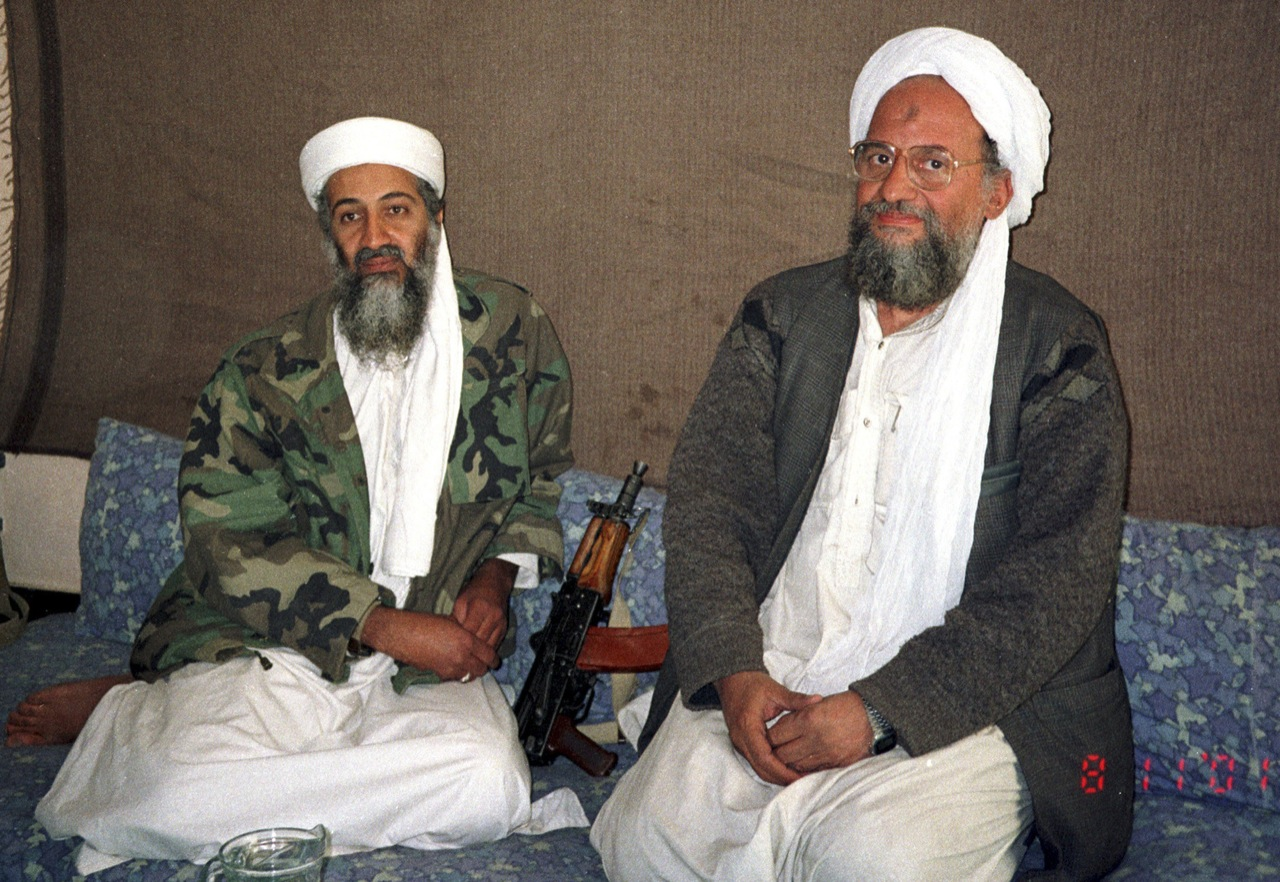
Osama bin Laden and Ayman al-Zawahiri of al-Qaeda promoted the overthrow of secular governments.

The contemporary period begins after 1924. With the defeat and dissolution of the Ottoman Empire (1908–1922), the Ottoman Caliphate was also abolished. This event heavily influenced Islamic thought in general, as well as what would later be termed radical Islamic thought. Key thinkers who wrote about Islam in the 20th century, especially concerning jihad, include Muhammad Abduh, Rashid Rida, Hassan al-Banna, Abul A'la Maududi, and Sayyid Qutb.

Sayyid Qutb, an Egyptian Islamist ideologue and prominent figure in the Muslim Brotherhood in Egypt, was influential in promoting Pan-Islamist ideology in the 1960s. Following Qutb's execution by the Egyptian government under the regime of Gamal Abdel Nasser, Ayman al-Zawahiri formed the organisation Egyptian Islamic Jihad to replace the government with an Islamic state reflecting Qutb's vision of Islamic revival. Qutbist ideology has influenced jihadist movements and terrorist groups seeking to overthrow secular governments, notably Osama bin Laden and Ayman al-Zawahiri of al-Qaeda, as well as the Salafi-jihadi group ISIL/ISIS. Moreover, Qutb's works have frequently been cited by bin Laden and Anwar al-Awlaki.

Sayyid Qutb has been described by scholars as a foundational figure of modern radical Islam. Unlike other Islamic thinkers mentioned above, Qutb was not an apologist. He was a leading ideologue of the Muslim Brotherhood and among the first to articulate these anathemising principles in his magnum opus Fī ẓilāl al-Qurʾān (In the Shade of the Qurʾān) and his 1966 manifesto Maʿālim fīl-ṭarīq (Milestones), which led to his execution by the Egyptian government. Other Salafi movements in the Middle East and North Africa and across the Muslim world adopted many of his principles.

According to Qutb, the Muslim community (Ummah) had been absent for centuries, reverting to jahiliyah (pre-Islamic ignorance) because societies failed to enforce sharia law. To restore Islam and free Muslims from what he considered the clutches of ignorance, Qutb advocated rejecting secular societal norms, establishing an ideological vanguard modelled on early Muslims, and preparing for jihad against jahili governance to overthrow it. Qutbism, the radical Islamist ideology derived from Qutb's writings, was subsequently rejected by many mainstream Muslim scholars and several leaders within the Muslim Brotherhood, such as Yusuf al-Qaradawi.

== Active Islamic extremist groups ==
=== Groups ===
Group name	Banner	Home base	Leaders	Strength	Casualties	Ideology
Al-Qaeda		Afghanistan, Pakistan, and MENA region	Osama bin Laden † (1988–2011); Ayman al-Zawahiri † (2011–2022); Saif al-Adel (de facto; 2022–present)	300–3,000	4,400 casualties	Sunnī Islamist and militant terrorist organisation which aims to "restore Islam", establish "true Islamic states", implement sharia law, and remove non-Muslim influences from the Muslim world, following the doctrine and teachings of Sayyid Qutb. The name translates to "Organisation of the Base of Jihad".
Al-Qaeda in the Islamic Maghreb		Kabylie Mountains, Algeria	Abdelmalek Droukdel † (2007–2020)	800–1,000+	200+	AQIM is a Sunnī Islamist and militant terrorist organisation which aims to overthrow the Government of Algeria and replace it with an Islamic state.
Ansar al-Sharia in Yemen (a.k.a. Al-Qaeda in the Arabian Peninsula)		Yemen	Nasir al-Wuhayshi † (2011–2015); Qasim al-Raymi † (2015–2020)	2,000+	Over 250 killed in the 2012 Sana'a bombing and 2013 Sana'a attack.	AQAP is considered the most active of al-Qaeda's branches, or "franchises", that emerged due to weakening central leadership. The U.S. government considers AQAP the most dangerous al-Qaeda branch due to its emphasis on targeting overseas interests.
al-Qaeda in the Indian Subcontinent		India, Pakistan, Bangladesh, and Myanmar	Asim Umar †	300	Claims 6 killed in assassinations; naval frigate hijacking attempted in 2014.	AQIS is a Sunnī Islamist and militant terrorist organisation which aims to overthrow the governments of Pakistan, India, Myanmar, and Bangladesh to establish an Islamic state.
Boko Haram (ISWAP)		North-eastern Nigeria, Chad, Niger, Mali, and northern Cameroon	Mohammed Yusuf † (2002–2009); Abubakar Shekau † (2009–2021)	500–9,000	Since 2009, killed over 20,000 and displaced 2.3 million.	Name translates to "Western education is forbidden"; founded as a Sunnī fundamentalist group influenced by Wahhabism, advocating strict sharia law. In 2015, pledged allegiance to ISIL, operating as Islamic State's West Africa Province (ISWAP).
Islamic State of Iraq and the Levant (ISIL / ISIS / Daesh)		Iraq and Syria	Abu Musab al-Zarqawi † (1999–2006); Abu Bakr al-Baghdadi † (2010–2019); Abu Ibrahim al-Hashimi al-Qurashi † (2019–2022); Abu al-Hasan al-Hashimi al-Qurashi † (2022); Abu al-Hussein al-Husseini al-Qurashi † (2022–2023); Abu Hafs al-Hashimi al-Qurashi (2023–present)	40,000–200,000 at peak across all regions	Over 30,000 killed, including targeted campaigns against Shīʿa Muslims, Christians, Yazidis, and other minority groups.	Salafi-jihadist and Sunnī militant terrorist organisation following a strict Wahhabi interpretation. Gained significant territory in Iraq and Syria in 2014 before facing military intervention from an international coalition.
Tehrik-i-Taliban Pakistan (TTP / Pakistani Taliban)		North-west Pakistan	Maulana Fazlullah †	25,000	Hundreds	TTP is an umbrella organisation of Sunnī Islamist and militant groups operating along the Afghan–Pakistani border.
Jaish-e-Mohammed		Kashmir	Masood Azhar			Aims to separate Jammu and Kashmir from India and unite it with Pakistan. Operates primarily in the Kashmir region.
Lashkar-e-Taiba (LeT)		Kashmir	Hafiz Saeed			Aims to introduce an Islamic state in South Asia and annex Jammu and Kashmir to Pakistan. Active in South Asia since at least 1993.
National Thowheeth Jama'ath		Sri Lanka	Zahran Hashim †		269 (excluding 9 bombers)	Aims to establish an Islamic state in Sri Lanka; carried out the 2019 Sri Lanka Easter bombings.

== Foreign political support ==
According to British historian Mark Curtis in Secret Affairs: Britain's Collusion with Radical Islam, Britain supported radical Islamic groups to counter secular nationalism because nationalist movements sought to control their domestic resources for internal development, which challenged British interests. The United States similarly supported radical Islamic factions as a counterweight against secular nationalism, which was viewed as a threat to Western geopolitical influence. Noam Chomsky and his co-authors also argue that during the 1967 Six-Day War, Israel targeted Egypt and Syria as bastions of secular Arab nationalism opposing Saudi Arabia, which they considered the primary sponsor of radical Islam.

== See also ==
- Antisemitism in the Arab world
- Antisemitism in Islam
- Attacks by Islamic extremists in Bangladesh
- Christian terrorism
- Islam and other religions
- Islam and secularism
- Islam and violence
- Islam and war
  - Religious violence#Islam
  - Holy war in Islam
- Islamic views on slavery
  - History of slavery in the Muslim world
  - Slavery and religion#Islam
  - Slavery in 21st-century jihadism
- Islam Yes, Islamic Party No
- Islamic extremism in Mali
- Islamic extremism in Northern Nigeria
- Islamic extremism in the 20th-century Egypt
- Islamic extremism in the United States
- Islamic terrorism
  - Jihadism
- Islamism
- Al-Ahkam al-Sultaniyyah
- Al-Siyasa al-Shar'iyya fi Islah al-Ra'i wa al-Ra'iyya
  - Post-Islamism
- List of Islamist terrorist attacks
- Mujahideen
- Persecution of minority Muslim groups
- Petro-Islam
- Qutbism
- Racism in Muslim communities
- Religious fanaticism in Islam
- Salafi movement
  - International propagation of Salafism and Wahhabism (by region)
  - Salafi jihadism
  - Wahhabism
- Sectarian violence among Muslims
- Takfirism
- Violence against Muslims in independent India
- Violent extremism
