= Accidental President =

Accidental President is a descriptor given to any president of the United States of America (USA) who was not elected to the office. It may refer to:

- John Tyler, 10th President of the United States, who assumed the office after the death of William Henry Harrison, the 9th President.
- Millard Fillmore, 13th President of the United States, who assumed the office after the death of Zachary Taylor, the 12th President.
- Andrew Johnson, 17th President of the United States, who assumed the office after the assassination of Abraham Lincoln, the 16th President.
- Chester A. Arthur, 21st President of the United States, who assumed the office after the assassination of James Garfield, the 20th President.
- Theodore Roosevelt, 26th President of the United States, who assumed the office after the assassination of William McKinley, the 25th President.
- Calvin Coolidge, 30th President of the United States, who assumed the office after the death of Warren G. Harding, the 29th President.
- Harry S. Truman, 33rd President of the United States, who assumed the office after the death of Franklin D. Roosevelt, the 32nd President.
- Lyndon B. Johnson, 36th President of the United States, who assumed the office after the assassination of John F. Kennedy, the 35th President.
- Gerald Ford, 38th President of the United States, who assumed the office after the resignation of Richard Nixon, the 37th President.
- The Accidental President (book) , a 2001 book by David A. Kaplan about the United States 2000 presidential election
