= Namira =

Namira is a given name and a surname. Notable people with the name include:

- Namira Nahouza (born 1979), French author and researcher
- Namira Salim (born 1975), Pakistani space enthusiast and peace advocate
- Hamza Namira (born 1980), Egyptian singer, songwriter, and music producer
