= F. Gregory Gause III =

F. Gregory Gause III is the John H. Lindsey ’44 Chair, Professor of International Affairs and Head of the International Affairs Department at the Bush School of Government and Public Service at Texas A&M. His specialty is the international politics in the Middle East

He received A.B. in Politics from St. Joseph's University in 1980 and his Phd from Harvard University in 1987 .

He was previously affiliated with Columbia University (1987-1995) and University of Vermont (1995 to 2014). He served as a Non-Resident Senior Fellow at the Brookings Doha Center (2012-2015); Fellow for Arab and Islamic Studies at the Council on Foreign Relations (1993-1994); Kuwait Foundation Visiting Professor of International Affairs at the Kennedy School of Government (2009-2010); and Fulbright Scholar at the American University in Kuwait (2009). He was appointed to his chair at Texas A&M in 2014.

Gause sits on the editorial boards of Political Science Quarterly, The Middle East Journal, the Journal of Arabian Studies, and Cambridge Middle East Studies. He has been involved with the Association of Gulf and Arabian Peninsula Studies as a senior advisor since 2013. He is a member of the board of directors of the Arab Gulf States Institute in Washington.

== Books ==
- Gause, F. Gregory. The International Relations of the Persian Gulf. Cambridge: Cambridge University Press, 2010.
- Gause, F. Gregory. Saudi-Yemeni Relations: Domestic Structures and Foreign Influence. New York: Columbia University Press, 1990. <http://catalog.hathitrust.org/api/volumes/oclc/20057203.html>.
- Gause, F. Gregory. Saudi Arabia in the New Middle East. New York: Council on Foreign Relations, 2014. <http://qut.eblib.com.au/patron/FullRecord.aspx?p=3137484>
- Gause, F. Gregory. Oil Monarchies: Domestic and Security Challenges in the Arab Gulf States. New York: Council on foreign relations Press, 2011.
