= The Accidental President (book) =

2001 book by David A. Kaplan

The Accidental President: How 413 Lawyers, 9 Supreme Court Justices, and 5,963,110 Floridians (Give or Take a Few) Landed George W. Bush in the White House is a 2001 book by Newsweek writer David A. Kaplan. The book details the 2000 United States presidential election, focusing on the battle over the electoral votes of the state of Florida that culminated in the United States Supreme Court ruling in Bush v. Gore that awarded the votes, and thus the Presidency, to George W. Bush.

== Bibliography ==
- Kaplan, David A. (2001). The Accidental President: How 413 Lawyers, 9 Supreme Court Justices, and 5,963,110 Floridians (Give or Take a Few) Landed George W. Bush in the White House. New York, William Morrow (an imprint of HarperCollins Publishers). ISBN 0-06-621283-9.
