= Namira Nahouza =

- Born: July 1979 (age 46); Marseille, France
- Education: Rennes Institute of Political Studies (Sciences Po Rennes), University of Exeter
- Occupation: Professor of Religious Studies
- Known for: Wahhabism and the Rise of the New Salafists: Theology, Power and Sunni Islam

Namira Nahouza (born July 1979) is a French author, academic researcher, university lecturer, teacher of Arabic and religious studies, and research fellow at Cambridge Muslim College, whose research focusses on contemporary Salafi-Wahhabi theories of Qur'anic and Hadith interpretation. She is probably best known for her book Wahhabism and the Rise of the New Salafists: Theology, Power and Sunni Islam, which was originally a PhD thesis submitted to the University of Exeter in 2009.

== Biography ==
She was born in Marseille in July 1979. She graduated from the Institute of Political Studies of Rennes (France) and the University of Exeter (United Kingdom). Holder of a master's degree in Arabic (University of Rennes and INALCO) in 2004. She completed her PhD in Arab and Islamic Studies at the University of Exeter and has an MA in European Studies. During her university studies, Namira completed several internships: at the French Embassy in Cairo, at the Permanent Representation of the Comoros to the United Nations in New York and France in 2001.

== Works ==
Namira's works include:

- Indépendance et partition des Comores, 1974-1978 (Moroni, Comoros: KomÉdit, 2005).
- Contemporary Wahhabism Rebranded as Salafism: The Issue of Interpreting the Qur'anic Verses and Hadith on the Attributes of God and Its Significance (Exeter: University of Exeter, 2009). (Note: This work studies the theology of Wahhabis/Salafis. Originally a Ph.D. dissertation submitted to the University of Exeter (2009).)
- Wahhabism and the Rise of the New Salafists: Theology, Power and Sunni Islam (London and New York: I. B. Tauris, 2018).

== See also ==
- David Commins
- Peter Mandaville
- Timothy Winter
- Khaled Abou El Fadl
- Sa'id Foudah
- Gibril Fouad Haddad
- Nuh Ha Mim Keller
- Mark Curtis (British author)
