= Islamic extremism in 20th-century Egypt =

Islamic extremism in Egypt caused terrorism and controversy in the country in the 20th century and continues to be a main issue in the 21st century Egyptian society. Egypt has a long history of radical and extreme sects of Islam with roots dating back to around 660 CE. Islamic extremism opposes "democracy, the rule of law, individual liberty and mutual respect and tolerance of different faiths and beliefs". These extreme beliefs led to radical actions across the Middle East. The main conflict between Islamic extremists and the government officials throughout history stems from two major issues: "the formation of the modern nation-state and the political and cultural debate over its ideological direction".

== Origins ==
Islamic extremism has its roots in a sect of Islam called Kharijism, which came about around 600 CE when the third and fourth caliphs were murdered during the first civil war. The Kharijites no longer exist today, and it did not continue as a sect of Islam, but their beliefs laid the early groundwork for much of what Islamic extremists believe today. During the time of their existence the name was understood as anyone who rebelled against the caliph or their appointer ruler, but over time the name came to denote anyone of Islamist beliefs, or “religiously motivated militants.” Much like the Islamic extremists today, the Kharijites “gave themselves the right to judge who is a true believer of Islam and who is not.” Also the Kharijites would eventually split into various sects, “whose common denominator was their claim that believers had to denounce” any Muslim leader who did not follow the Quran. The ideals of Kharijism would continue to exist in the more modern sects that were formed, but the sect itself would not continue to exist like the Sunni or Shia.

== 20th century ==
=== The Society of Muslim Brothers ===
During the 20th century, Egypt experienced several waves of revolutions to regain control of their nation from colonial rulers as to create a modern nation-state. Much of Egypt was Muslim at the time although there were significant numbers of Jews and Christians as well, but many of the political revolutions that Egypt experienced were centered on religions and how they related to politics. “The result was an ideological conflict over the direction of the Egyptian nation, over who had the legitimate authority to determine the direction,” and “by the 1930s a pattern of radical politics had taken hold across the Middle East.” In 1928, Hasan al-Banna founded the Society of Muslim Brothers, or Muslim Brotherhood, a prototype of the contemporary Islamic extremist movements. At this time, the revolutions were causing outbreaks of violence rooted in the political upheaval, but the Brothers denied to view their position as anything but religious. Like the Kharijites before them, the Brothers firmly believed that the law could only follow the guidelines that God had set for them. The Brotherhood rose to popularity through the 30s and 40s, and still had a significant membership in the 1950s, when Gamal Abdel Nasser began to rise to power.

==== Nasser's influence ====
Nasser and his party took control of Egypt in July 1953, and he quickly set out to destroy the largest branch of the Muslim Brothers. By the end of 1954, Nasser’s goals to “mobilize civic society” to create modern, independent Egypt, had ended the lives of several leaders of the Brotherhood while arresting or forcing the others into underground hiding. For Nasser, “Islam could and should be politicized, as long as it remained subordinate to the state’s political purpose.” Hoping that their political actions would be absolute, Nasser and Sadat would face the Islamist militants several more times in the coming decades.

=== Sayyid Qutb and Signposts ===
While detained in the Nasser regime’s concentration camps, the remaining members of the Muslim Brothers discussed and strategized new plans to take revenge on the secular enemy regime and Islamiscist thought was reconstructed. One of the incarcerated members was a man by the name of Sayyid Qutb (1906–1966), who was being detained in the camp in the year 1957. He was so “horrified by the barbarism of the camp guards” who brutally massacred twenty-one inmates who refused to do labor for fear of dying that he “believed the guards and torturers had forgotten God,” and “only the imprisoned Brethren were still true Muslims.”. While in the camp Qutb wrote a book titled, Signposts, that would serve as a reflection of the time spent in the camp would later serve as a “theoretical tool” that provided the future mission of the Muslim extremists. Qutb was released from the prison camp in May 1964, and continued plans to overthrow the regime except for the Brotherhood had divided and could not agree on a political strategy. Qutb was arrested a second time in 1965 before being sentenced to hanging in 1966 with several other Muslim Brothers. Although Qutb along with many other Islamists became martyrs for the cause their legacy did not die with them. Qutb’s writings argued that the Nasser regime belonged to the jahiliyya category. Jahiliyya is an Islamic concept of “pre-Islam barbarism” where the people were ignorant of the guidance of God. Qutb claimed that “the restoration of Islam required a genuine revolution” under the guidance of the Quran.

=== Shukri Mustafa ===
The next major influencer of Islamic extremism in Egyptian history is Shukri Mustafa (1942–1978). Egypt was still under Nasser’s rule when twenty-three-year-old Mustafa joined the Muslim Brotherhood, and was arrested for distributing Muslim Brotherhood materials at Asyut University. Mustafa was sent to Tura prison originally, but was transferred to one of the concentration camps for the Islamic extremists where he encountered different readings of Qutb’s Signposts, where the youth followers had split into several branches of thought. Mustafa joined the Qutbian group of Brothers that sought “complete physical and spiritual separation from the jahiliyya society.” This ideal was based on Muhammad’s hijra from Mecca to Medina, “whereby the Prophet removed his band of believers from the dangers and corruption of the unbelievers.” This group of Islamicists that were eventually led by Mustafa were known as al-Takfir wa’l-Hijra, and based on the ideal of complete separation from the jahiliyya society; they became a modern version of the Kharijites.

After Nasser’s death from health issues, Anwar Sadat took rule over Egypt, and released the prisoner’s from the concentration camps in 1971, as to try to make peace with the Islamic extremists. Then in 1973, after a conflict with the authorities, Mustafa and some of his followers took refuge in the landscape of the Minya region, “enacting the pure model that Mustafa had idealized in prison.” However, in 1977, the group kidnapped[Sheikh Muhammad Hussein al-Dhahabi as a hostage in an attempt to free their brothers, but al-Dhahabi was killed resulting in Mustafa’s arrest and execution.

==== The Takfir group ====
The Takfir group were among the many Islamic extremists that followed in the Kharijite ways, but “the sincerity as Muslims has overshadowed their rationality.” These groups were so concerned with the faults of the Muslim society in Egypt that they took extreme measures in attempt to change the way the modern society functioned. This tension of identifying as both modern and Muslim, has been a source of conflict since the days of colonialism. Kenney states, "The problem is that Muslims have lost their “cultural identity,” immersing themselves in the ways of the West; and as a result, they have become weak and divided. The young have lived through this cultural decay, and they have also witnessed the harsh manner in which Muslim activists have been treated in the recent past. Thus their natural instinct is to chance the situation and to seek revenge."

The Takfir group did not begin as a violent sect, but because of the violence shown to them, they reacted with the same harshness, which creates this never-ending conflict of religious extremism versus the secular state. Sadat’s government took a democratic position and was willing to negotiate with the Islamic extremist groups, but the religious extremists continued to act out against the government. After the government suppressed the Takfir, the group dissolved, and the members would then join other Islamist groups, some of which would cause major uprisings in the future.

=== Salih Sirriya ===
Salih Sirriya was born in Ijzim, near Haifa, in 1933 where he would later join the Islamic Liberation Party and be introduced to the Islamist theories. Several years later after traveling the Middle East, he settled in Cairo where the Muslim Brotherhood sparked his interest. “Unlike Shukri, Sirriya created no counter-society and organized no hijra to Cairo’s furnished flats.”. Even though they disagreed with the jahiliyya society under Sadat, Sirriya and his followers remained in Cairo living normal lives planning a coup d’e’tat. On April 18, 1974 Sirriya had organized a student ambush at the Military Academy in Heliopolis to hijack the armory and assassinate Sadat. The plan failed and Sirriya was arrested, tried, and sentenced to death along with another organizer.

==== Jama'at Islamiyya ====
Another similar group that involved students was Jama’at Islamiyya, an Islamist student association that became a powerful force on university campuses during the relatively calm time before the war of 1973. The group held the majority of the positions in the Student Union, and was soon seen as a threat to the regime for their influence amongst other youth. “In the absence of an alternative vanguard ideology, these groups attracted a growing following,” and campuses became filled with religious literature and activity.

=== Islamic extremism in the media ===
==== Al-Da'wa ====
After Sadat’s release of the Islamicist prisoners, old members of the Brotherhood asked for state recognition of their group, and although Sadat never agreed to their requests he did grant them the privilege to publish a monthly magazine, Al-Da'wa. The magazine was first published in 1976 and ran until September 1981. Al-Da'wa became a vehicle for the Islamicist movement to reach the general public, and it allowed them to express their intentions and goals on a variety of subjects including social, political, economic, and religious issues. Finally, Al-Da'wa was not the sole piece of Islamicist press, but the magazine was popular enough amongst this community that it could serve as a sounding board to judge reactions of the current activities. Al-Da'wa is just another example where the “desire to distinguish the just struggle against interfactional strife, ”but it also gave “unreserved support” to the members of the Brotherhood.

==== Sheik Kishk ====
Islamicist thought also made an appearance through a different form of media, the radio. A man named Abd al-Hamid Kishk, better known as Sheik Kishk, was responsible for recorded sermons that began appearing around 1972. Kishk was a religion student and became a leader of prayer, or imam, in government mosques in 1961, but he was arrested by the government in 1966 based on his suspected involvement with the Muslim Brotherhood. He was released two years later after and continued to preach at the Ministry of Awqaf, a government ministry in charge of religious endowments. Kishk’s sermons became so popular that extra buildings had to be constructed for his Friday sermons, and they began recording his sermons to be publicly aired on the radio in 1972. After about a decade of popularity amongst the Egyptian people, he was arrested again in 1981, and many of his tapes were banned. Kishk was released in 1982, after the assassination of Sadat, and the new regime has given him access to the media yet again.

=== Al-Jihad ===
On 6 October 1981, President Anwar Sadat was assassinated during a military parade by Khalid al-Islambuli, a member of a well-known organization that would bring the “image of the Kharijites to a new level of public attention,” the Jihad organization. The group tried to stage a revolution after the assassination, but was defeated quickly by the government. The Jihad organization, al-Jihad is named after the Islamic term, jihad, which is the “holy combat.” As an organization, the Jihad is more of an “alliance to like-minded Islamists than a single bureaucratic entity,” and it has two main branches in Egypt, in Cairo and in Asyut, but the Jihad organization has built a following in countries all throughout the Middle East. This is where al-Jihad differs from other groups such as the Takfir group that was led by one leader It was a collective organization run by several committees, leadership apparatuses, and departments. However, both groups relied on friendship ties to recruit from lower to middle class groups that formed a good portion of the new city populations. Al-Jihad successfully recruited from private mosques, which had become more common because they provided a safe meeting place for militants and recruits.

==== Mohammed Abdul-Salam Farag ====
One of the main figures in the Jihad, was Mohammed Abdul-Salam Farag. Farag was an electrician, who was an extreme Islamist thinker, and was involved in planning the assassination of Sadat. He was arrested and executed for his involvement in the assassination, but left a long-lasting legacy behind him. Farag was a former member of the Muslim Brotherhood and had participated in several other radical groups, but was disillusioned by their passive approach to Islamist thought. He founded al-Jihad in 1979 and wrote a short book titled, al-Farida al-Gha’iba, explaining his views on Islamist thought and recognizing the jihad that needed to be carried out against the modern state.

Although Farag, and Jihadist ideology does not advocate social separation like the Takfir group, it does view “association with the Mongol state and its institutions” as corrupt, immoral, and unwise (Kenney 136). He also speaks against joining “benevolent societies” or political parties because in doing so one would become part of the modern state that must be overthrown. The ultimate goal in the creation of al-Jihad was to establish a “renewed universal Islamic nation under a true Caliph, fully implementing Islamic sacred law as God’s ideal form of Islamic government.” Although many other groups dissolved under government repression, many members of these groups then joined al-Jihad because of their ability to survive. Despite the strong reactions of the government after the assassination of Sadat, al-Jihad reformed into smaller branches and has continued to be the source of terrorist acts and violent community outbreaks ever since.

=== The end of the century ===
After the assassination of Sadat, moving into the last decade of the century, al-Jihad remained the most prominent Islamic extremist group in Egypt, and was now harkening back to the ideals of their previous military commander, Lt. Col. Abbud al-Zumar, to recruit and rely on the masses to stage a successful uprising. Al-Zumar was responsible for organizing the attempted uprising in Asyut following the assassination of Sadat. Terrorism amongst these groups was not a new occurrence, and throughout the century it came and went in waves of attacks, each more severe than the last. The third and last wave of this century began with 1974 ambush of the Military Technological Academy and continued past the end of the century. This wave severely affected Egyptian society and internally threatened the public, the regime, and the modern state.

==== Under Mubarak ====
Hosni Mubarak took over control of the regime after Sadat, and while the first four years of his presidency experienced a relatively low number of violent attacks from radical groups, terrorism continued to increase and the early 1990s became the bloodiest years of the century. Much of the movement of the Muslim Brotherhood was non-violent and occurred within the social welfare infrastructures where they found supporters in the people who were socially and economically disadvantaged. As the tension rose between the religious and the secular sectors of Egyptian society the movements and acts once again became violent amongst some many of the newer radical groups, and with each attack the regime responded with more severity than the last, which only fueled the radical groups rage against the oppression. The new groups that had developed in the 1990s were branches of the prominent groups in the previous two decades, including al-Jihad, and were composed of a much younger, less educated, rural demographic.

Also the 1990s led to an increase in attacks against political figures, including assassination attempts directed towards the chairman of the parliament, Dr. Rif’ at Mahgoub in 1990, the Egyptian minister of information, Safwat al-Sharif in 1993, and the Egyptian Prime Minister, Atef Sidki also in 1993. Despite that many of these attacks were targeted towards figures of power, the Egyptian public feared the wrath of these radical groups. Because “extremists exhibit a decided [and collective] tendency toward bigotry, intolerance, compulsive excessiveness in personal piety, the [extreme] judgment of others,” the decisions and actions of these radical groups “deprives all people of the right to safety and protection, and instead sanctions their killing and the confiscation of their lives and property.”

== Legacy ==
Despite the large numbers of followers and support for these groups, they still remain a minority in Egyptian society. Their beliefs and actions are contradictory to traditional interpretations of Islam, and for them to take power over the people would require a massive shift in the established belief system. Also the approaches that these modern groups have attempted to carry out show brashness and naiveté in terms of effective strategies against the regime. Finally, many Egyptians do not support the radicals’ claim that a simple shift in political power and the establishment of shari`a as governmental law will instantly solve the country’s problems. Ann Elizabeth Mayer argues that Kharijism does support a democratic model in fact that it is a communal decision to elect a leader, and that this could be the early Islamic model from which to build a modern reform. However, the issue then becomes how to rearrange the conditions of Egyptian society to permit what would be an enormous transformation of the Egyptian way of life.
