= Peter Mandaville =

American academic and former government official

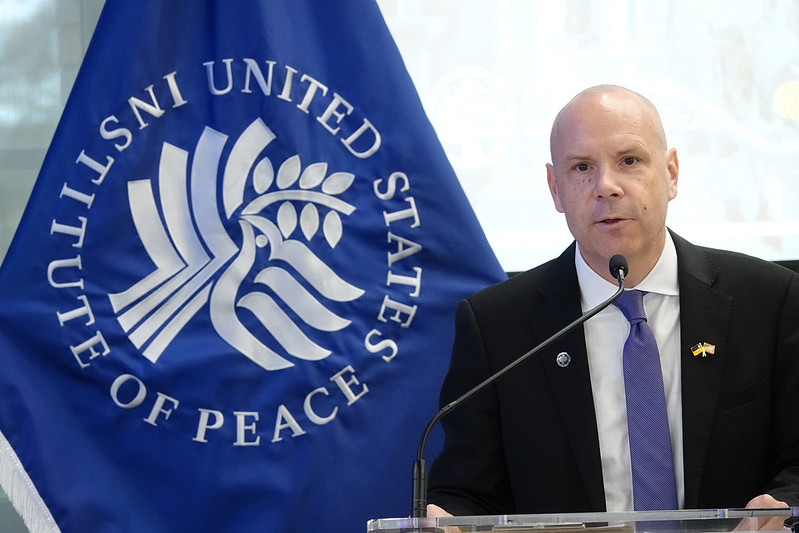
Mandaville in 2023

Peter Mandaville is an American academic and former government official.

== Biography ==
From 2015-16 he was senior advisor in the Secretary of State's Office of Religion & Global Affairs at the U.S. Department of State. His previous government work has included serving as a member of the State Department's Policy Planning Staff (2011–12) under former Secretary of State Hillary Clinton, where he was part of the team that helped to shape the U.S. response to the Arab Spring.

Since 2000 his primary professional home has been George Mason University in Virginia, United States where he is Professor of International Affairs in the Schar School of Policy and Government. At Mason he has also served as founding director of the Center for Global Studies and director of the Ali Vural Ak Center for Global Islamic Studies (now called the AbuSulayman Center for Global Islamic Studies). Earlier in his academic career he was lecturer in international relations at the University of Kent at Canterbury (1998-2000). In 2022 he joined the United States Institute of Peace as a senior advisor for religion and inclusive societies.

He has also been a nonresident senior fellow with the Center for Middle East Policy at the Brookings Institution (2012–15; 2017–2021) and currently a senior research fellow at Georgetown University's Berkley Center for Religion, Peace & World Affairs. Previously he was a visiting senior fellow at the Pew Research Center (2009–10), and an Adjunct Scholar at the RAND Corporation (2012–15; 2017-2018).

He is widely regarded as a leading expert on political Islam, Middle East affairs, and on Muslim communities in Europe and North America.

He has authored numerous book chapters and journal articles, contributed to publications such as the International Herald Tribune, The Guardian, The Atlantic, and Foreign Policy, and has consulted extensively for media, government and non-profit agencies.

== Major publications ==
- Transnational Muslim Politics: Reimagining the Umma (London: Routledge, 2001)
- The Zen of International Relations (London: Palgrave/St. Martin's Press 2001, co-edited with Stephen Chan & Roland Bleiker)
- Meaning and International Relations (London: Routledge, 2003, coedited with Andrew Williams)
- Global Political Islam (London: Routledge, 2007), a broad overview of Islamist movements and global Muslim politics
- Globalizing Religions (London: SAGE Publications, 2010, co-edited with Paul James)
- Politics from Afar (New York: Columbia University Press/Oxford University Press, 2011, co-edited with Terrence Lyons)
- Islam and Politics (London: Routledge, 2014; 2020), updated and expanded second and third editions of Global Political Islam.
- Wahhabism and the World: Understanding Saudi Arabia's Global Influence on Islam (New York: Oxford University Press, 2022)

== See also ==
- Nathan J. Brown (political scientist)
- Tamara Sonn
- Madawi al-Rasheed
- Namira Nahouza
