= David Commins =

American scholar of Islam

- Born: 1954 (age 71–72)
- Scientific career
- Fields: Islamic Studies
- Workplaces: Dickinson College

David Commins (born 1954) is an American scholar and Professor of History and Benjamin Rush Chair in the Liberal Arts and Sciences (1987) at Dickinson College. He is known for his works on Wahhabism.

== See also ==
- Namira Nahouza
