= David A. Kaplan =

American writer and journalist

- Born: October 20, 1956 (age 69); Brooklyn, New York, US
- Education: Cornell University; New York University School of Law; Stanford University
- Occupations: Writer, Journalist, Faculty
- Known for: Writer, Contributing Editor at Newsweek (1989 ~ 2009)
- Spouse: Audrey Sue Feinberg (m. 1989)
- Children: 2
- Awards: Gerald Loeb Award (2008)
- Website: www.davidakaplan.com

David Andrew Kaplan (born October 20, 1956) is an American writer and journalist. He worked for 20 years at Newsweek, and worked for Fortune magazine for five years.

== Biography ==
=== Early years ===
Kaplan was born in Brooklyn, New York, to a Jewish family, the son of Erna and Alan William Kaplan. His father was a surgeon and his mother, a clinical social worker at the university health service of the State University of New York at Stony Brook. His great-great-grandfather was Adolph Bergida, a founder of the Federation of Jewish Philanthropies. He is a cum laude graduate of Cornell University in 1978 and the New York University School of Law in 1981, where he won writing prizes in both his first and second years, as well as the school's upperclass Moot Court Competition. During the 1994-1995 academic year, he was a John S. Knight Fellow in Journalism at Stanford University. He was an intern with the U.S. Attorney's office in Manhattan and an intern at the White House Press Office during the Carter Administration, before serving as a litigator at a Wall Street law firm.

=== Newsweek ===
He had a 20-year career at Newsweek, where he wrote dozens of cover stories, as well as edited the annual Newsweek-Kaplan College Guide. Among his cover pieces at Newsweek: "The New Rich of Silicon Valley", "The Most Hated Man in Baseball", profiles of Justices Clarence Thomas and William Brennan, "The Selling of Star Wars", "The birth of Netscape", "The Great Home Run Chase of 1998", "The Return of the Hale-Bopp Comet", and "The Secret Vote That Made George W. Bush President". His Newsweek cover story in 2006 broke the notorious Hewlett-Packard boardroom spying scandal involving venture capitalist Tom Perkins, which led to Congressional hearings and California state indictments. That story was a finalist for a Gerald Loeb Award. The following year, Kaplan won a Loeb for the book Mine's Bigger, a biography of Perkins and the revolutionary high-tech sailboat he created. Kaplan also broke stories about how Bush v. Gore might have just gone the other way and about how the administration of death warrants in Florida executions was being manipulated for political purposes by the governor.

=== Fortune ===
He worked for Fortune magazine for five years. For Fortune, Kaplan's profiles included Charlie Rose, David Geffen, Shaquille O'Neal, Howard Schultz (of Starbucks), Ralph Nader, Marc Benioff (of Salesforce.com), David Boies, Dennis Kozlowski in prison, SAS, Haagen-Daz, Shake Shack, Mars Candy, Chipotle, Lou Dobbs, the former Hollywood agent Michael Ovitz, education entrepreneur Sal Khan, and Hostess Twinkies in bankruptcy. In July 2011, he wrote the much-debated cover story on "Tech Bubble 2.0." He's worked for a day on the Monopoly assembly line at Hasbro, at an Aeropostale register on Black Friday, and atop an asphalt tank at NuStar Energy. He also writes an occasional education column for the magazine.

=== Books, teaching, and consulting ===
Kaplan's other books include The Silicon Boys, a national bestseller that has been translated into six languages, and The Accidental President, an account of the Bush-Gore election dispute on which the Emmy-winning 2008 HBO feature film Recount is based. His book about the U.S. Supreme Court, The Most Dangerous Branch: Inside the Supreme Court in the Age of Trump, was published by Random House in 2018.

His writing has also appeared on the front page of The New York Times and The New York Times Op-Ed Page, as well as in Food & Wine, Wired, Parenting, Inc., Worth, Backchannel, and The Washington Post. In 1988, he was a finalist for the Livingston Award, which recognizes excellence by journalists than under 35; Kaplan's piece in the National Law Journal, "Death Row Dilemma," was about the strange case of William Henry Drake, who came within hours of electrocution despite two lawyers knowing he had not in fact killed anybody; the story explored how attorney-client confidentiality can lead to astonishing results.

These days, Kaplan writes for different publications, and consults for a range of CEOs, financial firms and other companies. since 2009, Kaplan has been an adjunct faculty of the Arthur L. Carter Journalism Institute of New York University. He teaches a popular undergraduate course on ethics and First Amendment law. Kaplan has appeared frequently on television on such programs as the Today Show, Nightline, Charlie Rose, and CNN Inside Politics. He also speaks at private corporate and government events. In April 2011, for a Fortune story, he auditioned to be the new voice of the Aflac duck in TV commercials. Out of 12,500 contestants he wound up finishing in 5th place.

== Personal life ==
In 1989, Kaplan married attorney Audrey Sue Feinberg in a Jewish ceremony in Bozman, Maryland. Kaplan lives north of New York City with his wife and their two sons.

== Honors ==
- 2007: Loeb Finalist (Magazines category), "Suspicions and Spies in Silicon Valley," Newsweek, September 18, 2006.
- 2008: Gerald Loeb Award, (Best Business Book of the Year category), Mine's Bigger: Tom Perkins and the Making of the Greatest Sailing Machine Ever Built
- 2013: NYSSCPA Excellence in Financial Journalism Award (investigative category), "Hostess Is Bankrupt Again", Fortune, July 26, 2012
- 2013: Deadline Club Award Finalist, "Hostess Is Bankrupt Again", Fortune, July 26, 2012

== Books ==
- Mine's Bigger: Tom Perkins and the Making of the Greatest Sailing Machine Ever Built (2007)
- The Accidental President (2001)
- The Silicon Boys (1999)
- The Greatest Business Decisions of All-Time (contributor) (2012)
- The 10 Laws of Trust (co-author, with Joel Peterson) (2016)
- The Most Dangerous Branch: Inside the Supreme Court's Assault on the Constitution (2018)
