= Uthman ibn Bishr =

'Uthman ibn 'Abdallah ibn Bishr
- عثمان بن عبدالله بشر
- Born: c. 1796 (1210 AH); Jalajil, Sudair, First Saudi State
- Died: 1873 (19 Jumada al-Thani 1290 AH); Jalajil, Second Saudi State
- Other name: Ibn Bishr
- Occupation: Historian
- Notable work: Unwan al-Majd fi Tarikh Najd (The Address of Glory in the History of Najd)
- Family: Al-Bishr of the Banu Zayd tribe

Uthman ibn Abdullah ibn Uthman ibn Bishr of the Banu Zayd, a Qahtanite tribe, famously known as Ibn Bishr (c. 1796 – 1873) was a Saudi historian, littérateur, and genealogist. He was a contemporary of the First Saudi State and the Second Saudi State, and he chronicled their events in his book Unwan al-Majd fi Tarikh Najd (The Address of Glory in the History of Najd).

== Lineage ==
He is Uthman ibn Abdullah ibn Uthman ibn Ahmad ibn Bishr ibn Ahmad ibn Muhammad ibn Hammad ibn Harqus ibn Fayyad ibn Atwi ibn Zayd, from Quda'a, from Qahtan.

== Early life ==
He was born in the town of Jalajil, one of the towns of Najd in the Sudair region, in the year 1210 AH (c. 1796 CE). He grew up there, received his education, and memorized the Quran. He was passionate about knowledge and fond of scholars, traveling throughout Sudair, Al-Washm, and Riyadh in pursuit of knowledge.

== Studies in Diriyah ==
He traveled to Diriyah in 1224 AH (1809/1810 CE). There, he learned from its scholars, including

- Ibrahim ibn Muhammad ibn Abd al-Wahhab.
- Ibrahim ibn Saif.
- Ali ibn Ghunaym ibn Saif, the judge of Unaizah.
- Uthman ibn Abd al-Aziz ibn Mansur, the judge of the towns of Sudair during the time of Imam Faisal bin Turki.
- Mansur al-Nasiri al-Tamimi.
- Ali ibn Yahya ibn Sa'id, the judge of Sudair.
- Abd al-Karim ibn Mu'ayqil.

== Works ==
- Unwan al-Majd fi Tarikh Najd (The Address of Glory in the History of Najd), in two parts.
- Suhayl fi Dhikr al-Khayl (Canopus in the Mention of Horses), a book concerning equine affairs.
- Al-Isharah fi Ma'rifat Manazil al-Sab' al-Sayyarah (The Indication in Knowing the Stations of the Seven Wanderers).
- Murshid al-Khasa'is wa Mubdi al-Naqa'is fi al-Thuqala' wa al-Hamqa wa Ghayr Dhalik (The Guide to Characteristics and the Revealer of Flaws in the Burdensome, the Foolish, and Others), published with an investigation by Dr. Hamad ibn Nasir Al-Dakhil.
- An index of Tabaqat al-Hanabila (The Generations of the Hanbalis) by Ibn Rajab, arranged alphabetically.
- Bughyat al-Hasib (The Calculator's Desire).
- A short treatise on the biography of Yusuf ibn Abd al-Muhsin al-Badri al-Wa'ili, one of the notables of Kuwait.

== Death ==
The historian Uthman ibn Bishr died on 19 Jumada al-Thani 1290 AH (c. August 1873 CE) in his hometown of Jalajil. His descendants continue to live in the city of Buraidah in Qassim Province, as well as in Al-Asha and Al-Zubair.

== Legacy ==
The house of the historian Uthman ibn Bishr is classified as one of the archaeological and heritage houses in the Kingdom of Saudi Arabia. It is located in the city of Jalajil, in the Sudair region. The house is situated in the Al-Dirah neighborhood within the old city wall. The building is distinguished by its "recessed geometric shapes in the form of bands and arches executed in plaster." The ceiling of the main council room (majlis) is made of wood and palm fronds. To the west of the majlis wall, a door leads to a small courtyard with two rooms, which were likely used for storage or for cooling water.

== See also ==
- Ibn Ghannam
- Ahmad Zayni Dahlan
- History of Wahhabism
- Muhammad ibn Abd al-Wahhab
- Abdul-Aziz bin Muhammad bin Saud
