= Ibn Ghannam =

Husayn ibn Ghannam
- Born: 1739 (1152 AH); Al-Ahsa, Ottoman Arabia
- Died: 1811 (1225 AH) (Age 73); Diriyah, First Saudi State
- Occupations: Historian, poet, scholar
- Known for: Chronicling the history of the First Saudi State
- Movement: Wahhabism

Husayn ibn Abi Bakr ibn Ghannam al-Najdi al-Ahsa'i was a historian, poet, and scholar of the Maliki school of Islamic jurisprudence. He was born and raised in the town of Al-Mubarraz in Al-Ahsa. He later moved to Diriyah, where he studied under Sheikh Muhammad ibn Abd al-Wahhab. His major works include Al-`Iqd al-Thamin fi Sharh Usul al-Din (The Precious Necklace in the Explanation of the Principles of Religion), and Rawdat al-Afkar wa al-Afham li Murtad Hal al-Imam wa Ta'dad Ghazawat Dhawi al-Islam (The Garden of Thoughts and Understandings for the Seeker of the Imam's Condition and the Enumeration of the Raids of the People of Islam), which is commonly known as The History of Najd, or The History of Ibn Ghannam. He died in Diriyah in the month of Dhu al-Hijjah in the year 1225 AH (1811 CE).

== Life ==
Husayn ibn Ghannam grew up in Al-Ahsa, where he memorized the Quran and began his scholarly pursuits with great diligence. He studied under the scholars of Al-Ahsa, including Aali Abdul Qadir and Aali al-Mubaarak, before traveling to Bahrain to learn from its prominent scholars. After returning to Al-Ahsa, he reconnected with his teachers before eventually migrating to Diriyah.

In Diriyah, he was warmly received by Abdulaziz bin Muhammad Al Saud and Muhammad ibn Abd al-Wahhab, who held him in high esteem. He settled in Diriyah and taught students subjects such as grammar and `Arūḍ (Arabic poetic meter), as well as the laws of inheritance. While he followed the Maliki school of fiqh (Islamic jurisprudence), the people of Najd were predominantly Hanbali. He also taught the principles of Tawhid (the oneness of God). He was known for his excellent teaching, upright character, sound intellect, and was a gifted poet and an accomplished historian. His company was considered enjoyable and his conversations engaging.

== Works ==
Ibn Ghannam was a contemporary of significant historical events, including the development of the Islamic reform movement (the Wahhabi movement) and the early years of the First Saudi State. He authored Al-`Iqd al-Thamin fi Sharh Usul al-Din, which he dedicated to Abdulaziz bin Muhammad Al Saud. His most famous work is Rawdat al-Afkar wa al-Afham li Murtad Hal al-Imam wa Ta'dad Ghazawat Dhawi al-Islam, commonly known as The History of Najd or The History of Ibn Ghannam. This work is divided into two parts:

=== Part One ===
The first part of his history reviews the writings of Sheikh Muhammad ibn Abd al-Wahhab. It discusses the prevailing religious conditions in the region before the Sheikh's emergence and details the life of the reformer. Ibn Ghannam included many of the Sheikh's personal letters and selected fatwas and commentaries on verses or chapters of the Quran.

=== Part Two ===
In the second part, Ibn Ghannam focused on the political and military aspects of the First Saudi State. He included a lengthy letter from Sheikh Muhammad ibn Abd al-Wahhab responding to one of his critics, as well as another letter in which Sheikh Hamad ibn Nasir ibn Mu'ammar addresses questions raised by the scholars of Mecca concerning the principles of the reform movement. This section covers the events of the First Saudi State from its inception until the year 1212 AH (1797/1798 CE), following the annalistic method of recording events year by year, a common practice among earlier historians.

His work is thus considered one of the most important primary sources on the history of the First Saudi State. The state underwent very significant events in the years between the end of his recorded history (1212 AH) and his death in 1225 AH. While it is likely he wrote about this crucial period, any such writings are now considered lost.

== See also ==
- Uthman ibn Bishr
- Ahmad Zayni Dahlan
- History of Wahhabism
