= Abdul Aziz bin Saud =

Abdul Aziz ibn Saud may refer to:

- Abdul-Aziz ibn Muhammad ibn Saud (1720–1803), second imam (leader) of the First Saudi State
- Abdulaziz ibn Abdul Rahman Al Saud (1876–1953), known as Ibn Saud of Saudi Arabia, founder and first king of modern-day Saudi Arabia
