= Sudair Industrial City =

Industrial city in Riyadh Province, Saudi Arabia

Sudair Industrial City مدينة سدير للصناعة والأعمال
- Industrial city
- Interactive map of Sudair Industrial City
- Country: Saudi Arabia
- Province: Riyadh Province
- Infrastructure work began: 2009

Government
  - Body: MODON

Area
  - Total: 258 km^{2} (100 sq mi)
- Some sources list the total area as 265 km².

Sudair Industrial City is a Saudi Arabian planned city of 258 square kilometres, strategically positioned and located approximately 120 km from Riyadh and 160 km from Al-Qassim. The land is surrounded by over 30 small cities and villages whose combined population exceeds 100,000. The infrastructure works started in 2009.

== Location ==
It is located directly on the road linking Riyadh city with northern part of Saudi Arabia which is connected with road network. In addition to that, Riyadh Airport is closely adjacent to the site. The establishment of the dry port in the Sudair city is also planned, as well as the privilege of the presence of the South – North land railway which links the central part of Saudi Arabia, including the Southern part of Riyadh, with the Northern boundaries of the Kingdom. The type of industries will mostly consist of light-to-medium and the master plan will indicate where the relevant industries should be located. The target industries identified with Sudair are in alignment with all the current initiatives under way in KSA and with the National Industrial Strategy for Saudi Arabia. It is envisioned that Sudair will serve as a complementary location to economic cities being planned due to its central location and proximity to the capital. The basic zoning concept has the site divided into predominantly two areas: residential and industrial.

== See also ==
- Saudi Industrial Property Authority
- Sudair Solar PV Project
