= Sudair =

Historical region of Najd, Saudi Arabia

Sudair سدير Sudayr
- Historical region
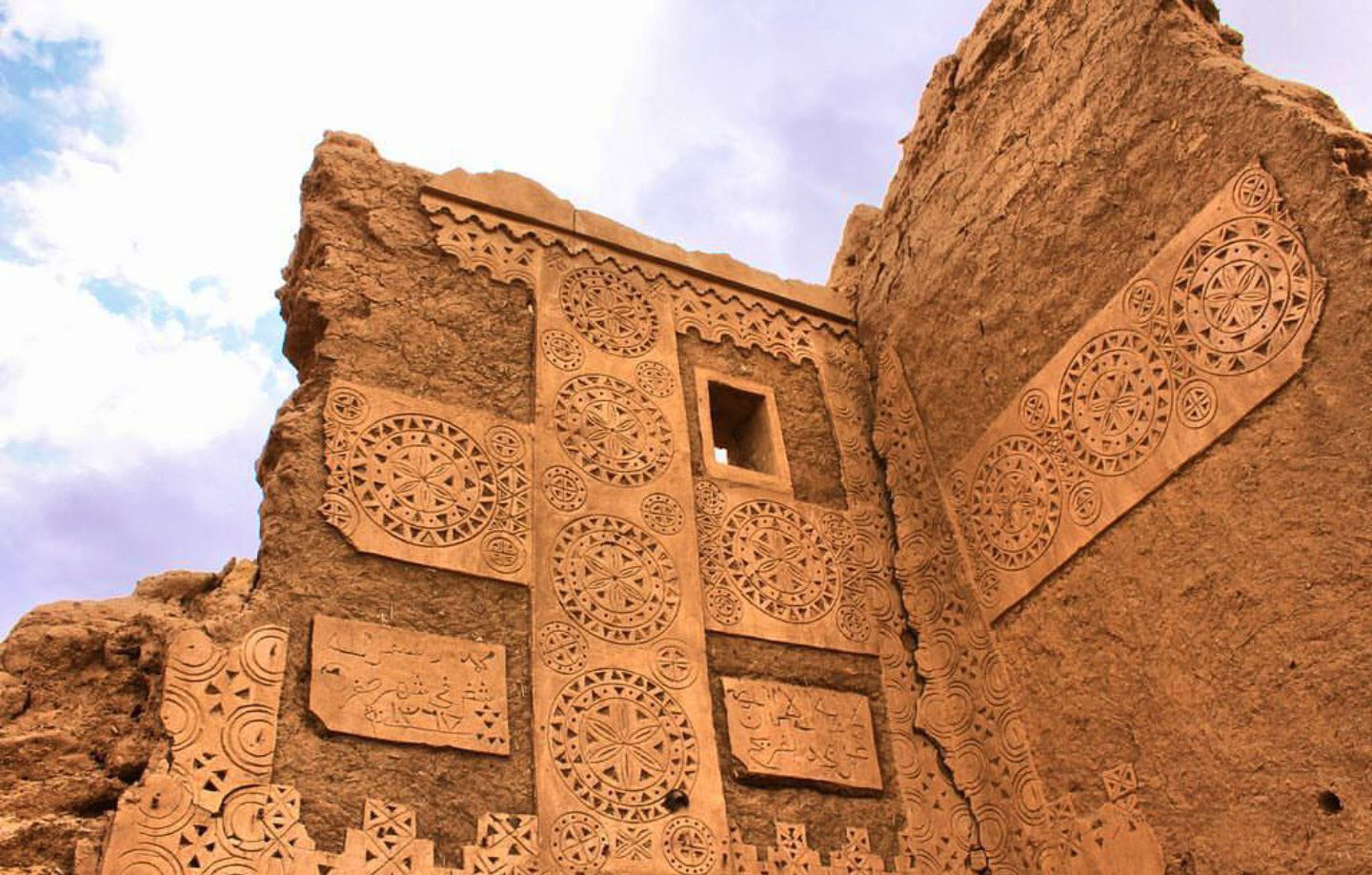
- Traditional architectural decoration in historic Jalajil, Sudair
- Map centred on Al-Muhaidb Palace Historical Village within Sudair
- Country: Saudi Arabia
- Province: Riyadh Province

Sudair, also spelled Sudayr, is a historical region of Najd in central Saudi Arabia, north of Riyadh. Its towns and agricultural settlements occupy valleys associated with the northern Tuwaiq uplands. Historical descriptions encompass a wider area than the valley commonly called Wadi Sudair or Wadi al-Faqi. Its principal settlements include Al Majma'ah, Hawtat Sudair, Jalajil, Rawdat Sudair, al-Tuwaim and Awdat Sudair.

The region's history includes medieval farming communities, locally ruled towns, and incorporation into successive Saudi states. Agriculture, water management and the relationships between neighbouring settlements were central to its development. Today, settlements such as Hawtat Sudair and Awdat Sudair are administered within al-Majma'ah Governorate in Riyadh Province.

== Geography and settlements ==
Sudair includes uplands, seasonal watercourses and cultivated valleys. In his early twentieth-century geographical account, John Gordon Lorimer placed its eastern boundary at the Dahna sands and its northern boundary at the sands separating Tuwaiq from Qassim. He identified four principal valleys, associated with al-Ghat, al-Majma'ah, al-Tuwaim and Batin al-Sudair. The latter contained many of the region's villages. Wadi al-Faqi is prominent in medieval descriptions and remains an agricultural corridor; Awdat Sudair lies in its lower reaches.

Distances from Riyadh vary across the region. Hawtat Sudair is approximately 162 kilometres (101 mi) from the capital, while Rawdat Sudair's heritage village is approximately 180 kilometres (110 mi) to its north. Jalajil lies south of al-Majma'ah and is also an administrative centre within its governorate.

Other settlements include Harmah, al-Dakhilah, al-Ma'ashbah, Tumair, al-Khutamah, Ashairat Sudair, al-Attar, al-Junaifi and al-Janubiyah. Historical accounts also included Al-Ghat and al-Zulfi within their descriptions of Sudair.

== History ==
=== Early Islamic and medieval settlement ===
Awdat Sudair is one of the region's oldest settlements, with a history extending to the first Hijri century, corresponding to the seventh and early eighth centuries CE.

Medieval Arabic geographical works describe the valley under the name al-Faqi, with variant spellings in later accounts. These descriptions associate a number of its settlements with branches of Banu Tamim, including Banu al-Anbar. Al-Isfahani's account of tribal settlements mentions Jalajil and other places in the vicinity of al-Faqi.

In the tenth century, al-Hamdani described a succession of settlements, palm groves, cultivated land and wells along the valley. His account refers to al-Hait, identified in later local histories with Hawtat Sudair, as a substantial settlement with a market. He also described Rawdat al-Hazimi, identified with Rawdat Sudair, as having palm trees and a fortified stronghold.

Later accounts connect the development of Rawdat Sudair with the arrival of Mazru al-Tamimi in 630 AH (1233 CE), while medieval references to the locality indicate an earlier history of settlement.

=== Local rulers and water management ===
Before Saudi expansion, Najd's agricultural towns were governed by local rulers, while nomadic tribal groups maintained substantial autonomy. The rulers of al-Ahsa and the Sharifs of Mecca sought influence in the interior, but neither established lasting control over Najd as a whole.

One of Sudair's seventeenth-century rulers was the poet Rumaizan bin Ghashsham of Rawdat Sudair. He maintained relations with the Sharifs of Mecca, including Zayd ibn Muhsin, whose assistance he sought during disputes with local opponents. Rumaizan and his community are credited with constructing the al-Sab'in dam, a stone structure designed to retain part of the seasonal floodwater for Rawdat Sudair's farms while allowing surplus water to continue downstream. The distribution of this water was contested by neighbouring communities.

=== First Saudi state ===
The expansion of the first Saudi state into Sudair involved both military campaigns and religious debate. Muhammad ibn Abd al-Wahhab corresponded with scholars in the region, whose responses included support and opposition; Abdullah al-Muways was among his prominent opponents.

Historian Abdullah al-Turki dates the principal campaigns to incorporate Sudair to 1170–1188 AH (1757–1774 CE), spanning the reigns of Muhammad bin Saud and Abdulaziz bin Muhammad. Towns joined, resisted or withdrew their allegiance at different stages. Al-Turki identifies 1774 as the first occasion on which all the region's towns came under Saudi authority, while distinguishing this from later revolts.

Fortifications remained important to warfare in the region. The Saudi garrison at al-Majma'ah faced attempts to penetrate its defences in 1193 AH (1779 CE), during the continuing struggle between Diriyah and its opponents.

In 1196 AH (1782 CE), opponents of Saudi rule, including the Al Madi of Rawdat Sudair, retook the town with support from the Banu Khalid ruler Sa'dun ibn Uray'ir. Forces led by Saud bin Abdulaziz subsequently recovered it, and the Al Madi were expelled under a negotiated settlement.

Saudi administration included a regional emir whose seat moved between towns, including Jalajil and al-Majma'ah. The first Saudi state ended in 1818, when Ibrahim Pasha captured Diriyah during the Ottoman–Saudi War.

=== Second Saudi state and Rashidi expansion ===
After establishing his rule in Riyadh in 1824, Turki bin Abdullah extended his authority over Sudair and other districts of central Najd. Regional appointments linked the towns to the administration in Riyadh. Ahmad bin Nasser al-Sani was appointed emir in 1244 AH and also administered Sudair's treasury. During Faisal bin Turki's rule, Muhammad bin Ahmad al-Sudairi was appointed over Sudair and neighbouring districts in 1263 AH, with his headquarters at al-Majma'ah. At other times, regional officials were based at Jalajil or al-Tuwaim.

The second Saudi state weakened during the succession disputes following Faisal's death in 1865, while the Al Rashid of Ha'il expanded their power. Lorimer's historical account records the extension of Rashidi control into Sudair and the occupation of al-Majma'ah. In 1882, Abdullah bin Faisal attempted to recover Sudair and Qassim, but withdrew to Riyadh when confronted by a larger Rashidi force.

=== Incorporation into modern Saudi Arabia ===
Following Ibn Saud's capture of Riyadh in 1902, Saudi authority expanded northward. With Sudair being incorporation in 1904, alongside the expansion into al-Mahmal, al-Shu'ayb and al-Washm. These territories became part of the Kingdom of Saudi Arabia, proclaimed in 1932.

The name Sudair continued in regional administration, including the designation of officials based at al-Majma'ah. In the present administrative system, Hawtat Sudair, Jalajil and Awdat Sudair are centres within al-Majma'ah Governorate.

== Economy ==
Agriculture traditionally depended on wells and seasonal water. Lorimer recorded dates, wheat and barley as the principal crops, alongside fodder and fruit, and noted the use of camels and cattle to operate water lifts. Awdat Sudair remains associated with date palms and the cultivation of wheat, maize and barley.

The region also maintained connections with other parts of Arabia and southern Iraq. In discussing his research on Sudair, al-Turki identified migration to al-Ahsa and al-Zubayr, as well as scholarly journeys to Medina, al-Ahsa, Damascus and Cairo.

Modern industrial development includes Sudair City for Industry and Businesses, established in 2009 and administered by the Saudi Authority for Industrial Cities and Technology Zones (MODON). Its industries include food and beverages, pharmaceuticals and medical products, machinery, electrical equipment and electronics. In 2022, Asharq Al-Awsat reported that the city had 331 industrial, service and logistics contracts covering projects in production, construction or establishment.

The Sudair Solar PV Project, located in the industrial city, has a generating capacity of 1,500 megawatts. The project reached full commercial operation in January 2024.

== Heritage and education ==
The old towns preserve examples of Najdi building traditions. At Rawdat Sudair, houses were constructed using earth and mud brick, with plaster decoration and roofs supported by tamarisk wood and palm materials. The heritage town contains approximately 350 mud houses across an area of about 58,000 square metres (14 acres). It includes the old al-Hazm quarter and al-Huzaym, an extension built outside the walls after Saudi unification. Many houses have two storeys, and the settlement has two gates, Bab Bu'aylah and Bab Sultan.

Awdat Sudair contains the archaeological site of Ghailan, including a stone-built palace with a well and adjoining structures. Other sites in the vicinity retain foundations, walls and traces of water channels. The al-Sab'in dam at Rawdat Sudair is another surviving feature of the region's agricultural heritage. In 2019, Rawdat Sudair hosted the al-Hazm heritage festival, which included traditional crafts, local foods, museum visits and an exhibition of documents and manuscripts.

Education before the establishment of government schools included mosque teaching and kuttab instruction in reading, writing and the Quran. A local history of Ashairat Sudair distinguishes these earlier institutions from formal schooling, dating the town's first government boys' school to 1374 AH and its first girls' school to 1391 AH.

Majmaah University, established in 2009, has colleges in al-Majma'ah, al-Zulfi, al-Ghat, Rumah and Hawtat Sudair. Its Hawtat Sudair Observatory, established in 2014, supports astronomical research and observation of lunar crescents used in determining the beginnings of Hijri months.

== Notable people ==
People with documented connections to Sudair include:

- Hassa bint Ahmed al-Sudairi, born in al-Ghat, a wife of Ibn Saud and mother of his seven sons known as the Sudairi Seven, including Fahd and Salman.
- Abdulaziz al-Tuwaijri, writer and National Guard official who earlier supervised the treasury of al-Majma'ah and headed the financial administration of Sudair, al-Majma'ah and al-Zulfi.
- Adel al-Jubeir, diplomat and former Saudi foreign minister, born in al-Majma'ah.
- Princess Rajwa Al Hussein, wife of Hussein, Crown Prince of Jordan. Born in Riyadh, she belongs to the Al Saif family, associated with the sheikhdom of al-Attar in Sudair.
- Rumaizan bin Ghashsham, seventeenth-century poet and ruler of Rawdat Sudair, associated with the construction of the al-Sab'in dam.
- Ahmad al-Manqur, jurist and chronicler born in Hawtat Sudair, where he served as a judge. His works include a collection of legal opinions and a chronicle of Najd.
- Hamad ibn La'bun, historian who served as imam and preacher of the main mosque in al-Tuwaim.
- Abdullah Aba Batin, Islamic scholar and judge born in Rawdat Sudair, who held judicial appointments in Sudair and al-Washm.
- Muhammad ibn La'bun, Nabati poet whose family came from Harmah. Saudipedia's biography places his birth and upbringing in Thadiq after the family's departure from Harmah.
- Al-Muhaidib family, which have historical roots in Hawtat Sudair. Members of the family served as the town's emirs, and the family has also included judges, scholars and businesspeople.

== See also ==
- Najd
- Al Majma'ah
- Sudair Industrial City
- Sudair Solar PV Project
