= Sudair Solar PV Project =

Solar photovoltaic power plant in Saudi Arabia

- Country: Saudi Arabia
- Location: Sudair Industrial City
- Status: Operational
- Commission date: 2023; 2 years ago
- Construction cost: $924 million
- Owner: Sudair One Renewable Energy Company & Consortium ACWA Power

Power generation
- Nameplate capacity: 1.5 GW

The Sudair PV IPP is a solar photovoltaic (PV) power plant located in Sudair Industrial City, Saudi Arabia.

== Description ==
The Sudair Solar PV Project, a solar photovoltaic power plant, is in the final stages of commissioning in Sudair Industrial City, Saudi Arabia. This project forms part of the Public Investment Fund (PIF)'s initiative within the renewable energy sector and aligns with the Saudi Vision 2030 project, which aims to derive 70% of the country’s renewable energy by 2030. Additionally, it supports the objectives of the Saudi Green Initiative, which focuses on reducing greenhouse gas emissions and promoting a circular carbon economy.

== Overview ==
When completed, the Sudair Solar PV Project will have a capacity of 1,500 MW, with the ability to supply power to approximately 185,000 households. The undertaking involves an investment of SAR 3.4 billion ($924 million) and forms part of Saudi Arabia’s broader renewable energy strategy, targeting 58.7 GW of clean energy by 2030.

== Technology ==
The Sudair Solar PV Project incorporates bi-facial solar panels with single-axis tracking technology to increase sun absorption and overall system efficiency. The project encompasses an area of 30.8 square kilometers, and comprises 4.5 million solar modules.

== Impact ==
The Sudair Solar PV Project is projected to annually offset an estimated 2.9 million tons of carbon dioxide emissions. In addition, the initiative is expected to generate 1,200 jobs during the construction phase, and 120 permanent jobs during operation.

== Development ==
Led by a consortium of ACWA Power, Water and Electricity Holding Company (Badeel), and Saudi Aramco Power Company, the project was awarded in January 2021, construction of the project completed and commissioned partially in 2023, and is slated for full completion by 2024, expected to create over 4,000 employment opportunities.

== See also ==
- List of photovoltaic power stations
- Photovoltaic power station
- Sudair Industrial City
