= History of Wahhabism =

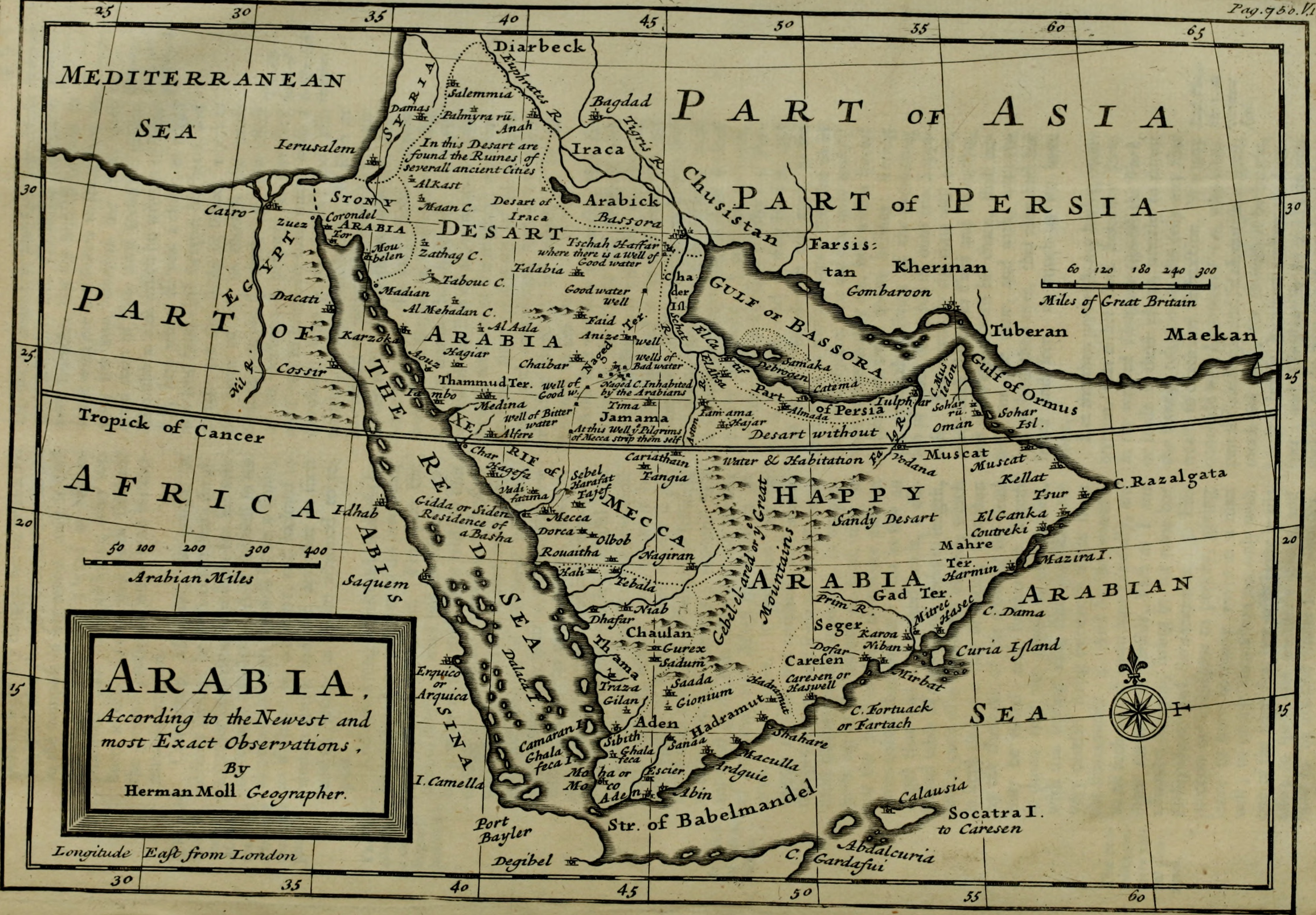
An 18th century map of the Arabian Peninsula circa. 1740s

The Wahhabi movement started as a revivalist and reform movement in the Arabian Peninsula during the early 18th century, whose adherents described themselves as "Muwahhidun" (Unitarians). A young cleric named Muhammad ibn Abd al-Wahhab (1703–1792 C.E/ 1115–1206 A.H), the leader of the Muwahhidun and eponym of the Wahhabi movement, called upon his disciples to denounce certain beliefs and practices associated with cult of saints as idolatrous impurities and innovations in Islam (bid'ah). His movement emphasized adherence to the Quran and hadith, and advocated the use of ijtihad. Eventually, Ibn 'Abd al-Wahhab formed a pact with a local leader, Muhammad bin Saud, offering political obedience and promising that protection and propagation of the Wahhabi movement meant "power and glory" and rule of "lands and men".

18th and 19th century European historians, scholars, travellers and diplomats compared the Wahhabi movement with various Euro-American socio-political movements in the Age of Revolutions. Calvinist scholar John Ludwig Burckhardt, author of the well-received works "Travels in Arabia" (1829) and "Notes on the Bedouins and Wahábys" (1830), described the Muwahhidun as Arabian locals who resisted Turkish hegemony and its "Napoleonic" tactics. Historian Loius Alexander Corancez in his book "Histoire des Wahabis" described the movement as an Asiatic revolution that sought a powerful revival of Arab civilisation by establishing a new order in Arabia and cleansing all the irrational elements and superstitions which had been normalised through Sufi excesses from Turkish and foreign influences. Scottish historian Mark Napier attributed the successes of Ibn 'Abd al-Wahhab's revolution to assistance from "frequent interpositions of Heaven".

After the Unification of Saudi Arabia, Wahhabis were able spread their political power and consolidate their rule over the Islamic holy cities of Mecca and Medina. After the discovery of petroleum near the Persian Gulf in 1939, Saudi Arabia had access to oil export revenues, revenue that grew to billions of dollars. This money – spent on books, media, schools, universities, mosques, scholarships, fellowships, lucrative jobs for journalists, academics and Islamic scholars – gave Wahhabi ideals a "preeminent position of strength" in Islam around the world.

== Origins ==
The patronym of Wahhabism, Muhammad ibn ʿAbd-al Wahhab, was born around 1702–03 in the small oasis town of 'Uyayna in the Najd region, in what is now central Saudi Arabia. During this era, numerous pre-Islamic beliefs and customs were practiced by the Arabian Bedouin. These included various folklores associated with ancestral worship, belief in cult of saints, animist practices, solar myths, fetishism, etc. which had become popular amongst the nomadic tribes of central Arabia.

Ibn Abd al-Wahhab was born to a family of Hanbali jurists. As part of his scholarly training, Ibn 'Abd al-Wahhab travelled in his youth to various Islamic centres in Arabia and Iraq, seeking knowledge. He travelled to Mecca and Medina to perform Hajj and studied under notable hadith scholars. After completing his studies, he travelled to Iraq and returned to his hometown in 1740. During these travels, Ibn Abd al-Wahhab had studied various religious disciplines such as Fiqh, theology, philosophy and Sufism. Exposure to various rituals and practices centered on the cult of saints would lead Ibn Abd al-Wahhab to grow critical of various superstitious practices and accretions common among Sufis, by the time of his return to Uyayna. Following the death of his father, Ibn Abd al-Wahhab publicly began his religious preaching.

=== Ibn 'Abd al-Wahhab: Early Preaching ===
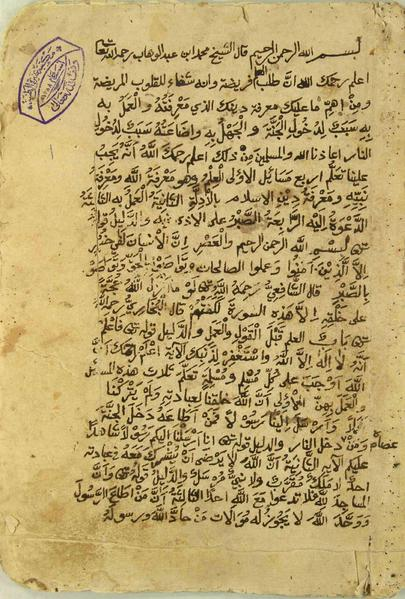
Usul al-Thalatha (Three Fundamental Principles), a pamphlet by Ibn 'Abd al-Wahhab

When Muhammad ibn ʿAbd al-Wahhab began preaching his dawah in the regions of Central Arabia, where various beliefs and practices related to veneration of Muslim saints and superstitions were prevalent among Muslims, he was initially rejected and called a "deviant". Later, however, his call to dawah became increasingly popular. Realising the significance of efficient and charismatic religious preaching (da'wa), Ibn 'Abd al-Wahhab called upon his students to master the path of reasoning and proselytising over warfare to convince other Muslims of their reformist ideals. Thus, Ibn 'Abd al-Wahhab carried out his reforms in a manner that reflected the socio-political values of the Arabian Bedouins to accommodate local sentiments.

According to Islamic beliefs, any act or statement that involves worship to any being other than God and associates other creatures with God's power is tantamount to idolatry (shirk). The core of the controversy between Ibn ʿAbd al-Wahhab and his adversaries was over the scope of these acts. According to Ibn ʿAbd al-Wahhab, those who made acts of devotion such as seeking aid (istigatha) from objects, tombs of dead Muslim saints (Awliyaa), etc. were heretics guilty of bidʻah (religious innovation) and shirk (polytheism). Reviving Ibn Taymiyya's approach to takfīr (excommunication), Ibn ʿAbd al-Wahhab declared those who adhered to these practices to be either infidels (kuffār) or false Muslims (munāfiḳūn), and therefore deemed them worthy of death for their perceived apostasy (ridda). Those Muslims that he accused to be heretics or infidels would not be killed outright; first, they would be given a chance to repent. If they repented their repentance was accepted, but if they didn't repent after the clarification of proofs they were executed under the Islamic death penalty as apostates (murtaddin).

Ibn 'Abd al-Wahhab was a major proponent of the 'Udhr bil Jahl (excuse of ignorance) doctrine, wherein any person unaware of core Islamic teachings had to be excused until clarification. As per this doctrine, those who fell into beliefs of shirk (polytheism) or kufr (disbelief) are to be excommunicated only if they have direct access to Scriptural evidences and get the opportunity to understand their mistakes and retract. Hence he asserted that education and dialogue was the path forward and forbade his followers from engaging in reckless accusations against their opponents. Following this principle, Ibn 'Abd al-Wahhab delegated the affairs of his enemies to God and in various instances, withheld from fighting them.

The doctrines of Ibn ʿAbd al-Wahhab were criticized by a number of Islamic scholars during his lifetime, accusing him of disregarding Islamic history, monuments, traditions and the sanctity of Muslim life. His critics were mainly ulama from his homeland, the Najd region of central Arabia, which was directly affected by the growth of the Wahhabi movement, based in the cities of Basra, Mecca, and Medina. His beliefs on the superiority of direct understanding of Scriptures (Ijtihad) and rebuke of Taqlid (blindfollowing past legal works) also made him a target of the religious establishment. For his part, Ibn 'Abd al-Wahhab criticised the nepotism and corruption prevalent in the clerical class.

The early opponents of Ibn ʿAbd al-Wahhab classified his doctrine as a "Kharijite sectarian heresy". By contrast, Ibn ʿAbd al-Wahhab profoundly despised the "decorous, arty tobacco-smoking, music happy, drum pounding, Egyptian and Ottoman nobility who traveled across Arabia to pray at Mecca each year", and intended to either subjugate them to his doctrine or overthrow them. He further rejected and condemned allegations charged against him by various critics; such as the claim of Takfir (excommunication) on those who opposed him or did not emigrate to the lands controlled by Muwahhidun. Responding to the accusations brought against him, Ibn 'Abd al-Wahhab asserted:

"as for the lie and slander, like their saying that we make generalized takfīr, and that we make emigration obligatory towards us,. .. All of this is from lying and slander by which they hinder the people from the religion of Allāh and His Messenger. And when it is the case that we do not make takfir of those who worship the idol which is on the grave of 'Abd al-Qadir, or the idol upon the grave of Ahmad al-Badawi; and their likes – due to their ignorance and an absence of one to caution them – how could we then make takfir of those who does not commit shirk, when they do not migrate to us, nor make takfir of us, nor fight us?"

With the support of the ruler of the town – Uthman ibn Mu'ammar – Ibn 'Abd al-Wahhab carried out some of his religious reforms in 'Uyayna, including the demolition of the tomb of Zayd ibn al-Khattab, one of the Sahaba (companions) of the Islamic prophet Muhammad, and the stoning to death of an adulterous woman after her self-confession. However, a more powerful chief (Sulaiman ibn Muhammad ibn Ghurayr) pressured Uthman ibn Mu'ammar to expel him from 'Uyayna.

=== Alliance with the House of Saud ===
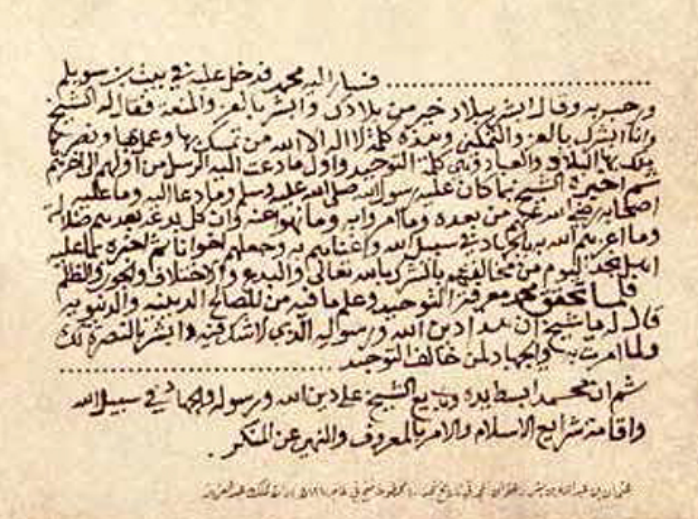
Document describing the historic meeting between Muhammad ibn Saud and Muhammad ibn 'Abd al-Wahhab

The ruler of a nearby town, Muhammad ibn Saud, invited Ibn ʿAbd al-Wahhab to join him, and in 1744 a pact was made between the two. Ibn Saud would protect and propagate the doctrines of the Wahhabi mission, while Ibn ʿAbd al-Wahhab "would support the ruler, supplying him with 'glory and power'". Whoever championed his message, Ibn ʿAbd al-Wahhab promised, "will, by means of it, rule the lands and men". Ibn Saud would abandon non-shari'i practices such as taxations of local harvests, and in return God might compensate him with booty from conquest and sharia compliant taxes that would exceed what he gave up. The alliance between the Wahhabi mission and Al Saud family has "endured for more than two and half centuries", surviving defeat and collapse. The two families have intermarried multiple times over the years, and in today's Saudi Arabia the minister of religion is always a member of the Al ash-Sheikh family, i.e. a descendant of Ibn ʿAbd al-Wahhab.

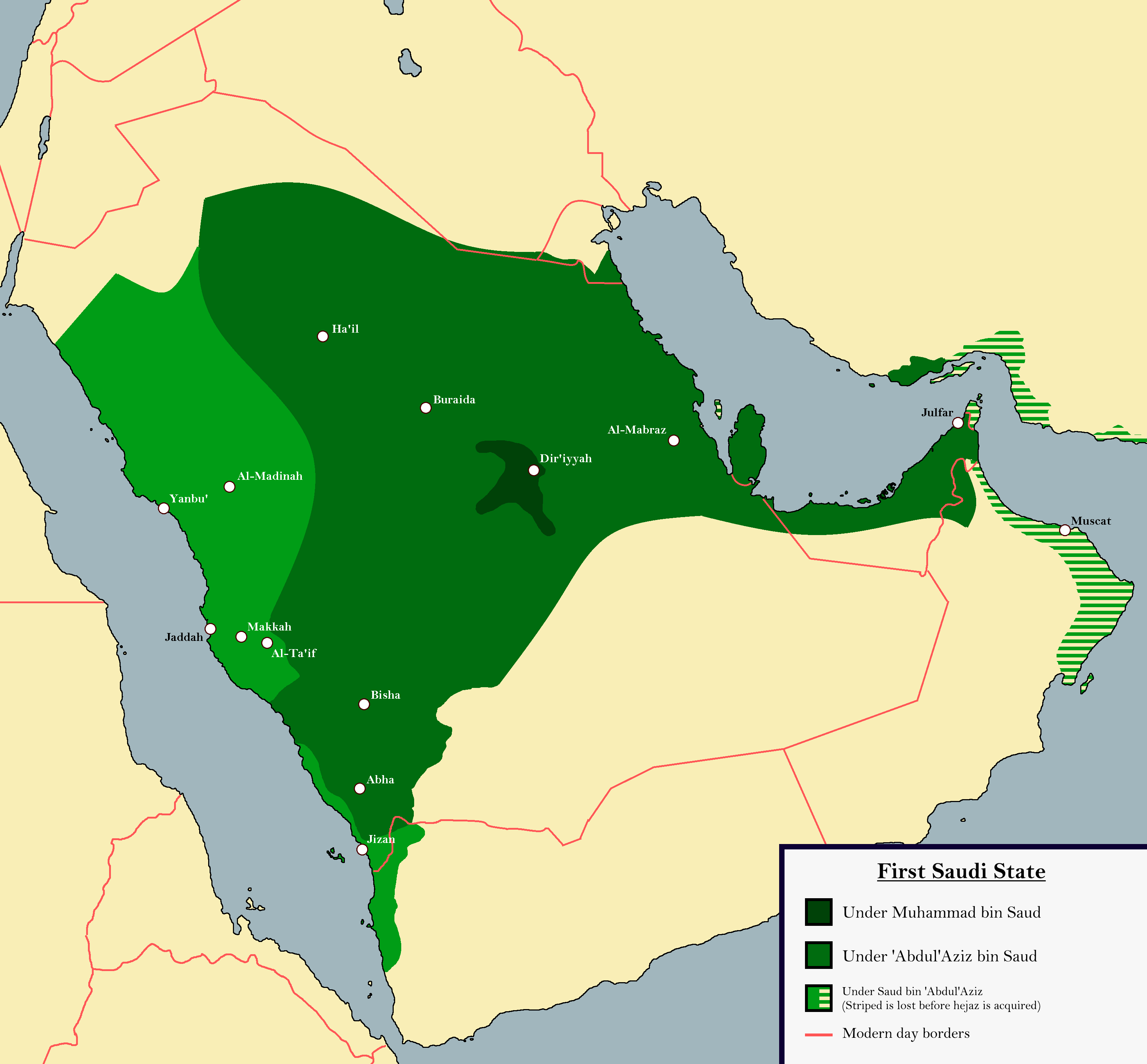
The First Saudi state (1744–1818)

According to Natana J. DeLong-Bas, Ibn ʿAbd al-Wahhab was restrained in urging fighting with perceived unbelievers, preferring to preach and persuade rather than attack. (Note: At various times Ibn Abd al-Wahhab either waged not jihad but only qital (fighting) against unbelievers ...) Ibn ʿAbd al-Wahhab followed a non-interference policy in Ibn Saud's state consolidation project. While Ibn Saud was in charge of political and military issues, he promised to uphold Ibn ʿAbd al-Wahhab's religious teachings. However, the military campaigns of Ibn Saud weren't necessarily met with approval by Ibn ʿAbd al-Wahhab. Delineating the specific roles of Amir (political leader) and Imam (religious leader), Ibn ʿAbd al-Wahhab stipulated that only the imam (religious leader) could declare the military campaign as jihad after meeting the legal religious stipulations. Ibn ʿAbd al-Wahhab had only authorized jihad when the Wahhabi community were attacked first, as a defensive measure. (Note: DeLong-Bas also maintains that Ibn Abd al-Wahhab waged jihad only in defense against aggressive opponents.) His main objective was religious reformation of Muslim beliefs and practices through a gradual educational process. With those who differed with his reformist ideals, Ibn ʿAbd al-Wahhab called for dialogue and sending invitations to religious discussions and debates, rather than a "convert or die" approach. Military resort was a last-case option; and when engaged in rarely, it abided by the strict Islamic legal codes.

Ibn ʿAbd al-Wahhāb and his supporters held that they were the victims of aggressive warfare; accusing their opponents of starting the pronouncements of Takfir (excommunication) and maintained that the military operations of Emirate of Dirʿiyya were strictly defensive. The memory of the unprovoked military offensive launched by Dahhām ibn Dawwās (fl. 1187/1773), the powerful chieftain of Riyadh, on Diriyya in 1746 was deeply engrained in the Wahhabi tradition and it was the standard claim of the movement that their enemies were the first to pronounce Takfir and initiate warfare. Prominent Qadi of Emirate of Najd (Second Saudi state) and grandson of Ibn 'Abd al-Wahhab, Abd al-Rahman ibn Hassan Aal al-Shaykh, (1196–1285 A.H / 1782–1868 C.E) describes the chieftain Dahhām as the first person who launched an unprovoked military attack on the Wahhābīs, aided by the forces of the strongest town in the region. Early Wahhabi chronicler Ibn Ghannām states in his book Tarikh an-Najd (History of Najd) that Ibn ʿAbd al-Wahhāb did not order the use of violence until his enemies excommunicated him and deemed his blood licit:

"He gave no order to spill blood or to fight against the majority of the heretics and the misguided until they started ruling that he and his followers were to be killed and excommunicated."

Ibn 'Abd al-Wahhab consistently elucidated through his writings that his Jihad was only defensive and was intended to safeguard the community from external attacks; with the ultimate objective of restoring peace and defend the Islamic faith. Killings on non-combatant civilians were strictly prohibited and all expansionist wars intended for wealth or power were condemned. However, after the death of Muhammad ibn Saud in 1765, his son and successor, Abdulaziz bin Muhammad, began military exploits to extend Saudi power and expand their wealth, abandoning the educational programmes of the reform movement and setting aside Islamic religious constraints on war. Due to disagreements, Ibn ʿAbd al-Wahhab would resign his position as imam and retire from overt political and financial career in 1773. He abstained from legitimising Saudi military campaigns; dedicating the rest of his life for educational efforts and in asceticism.

== Ottoman-Wahhabi war ==
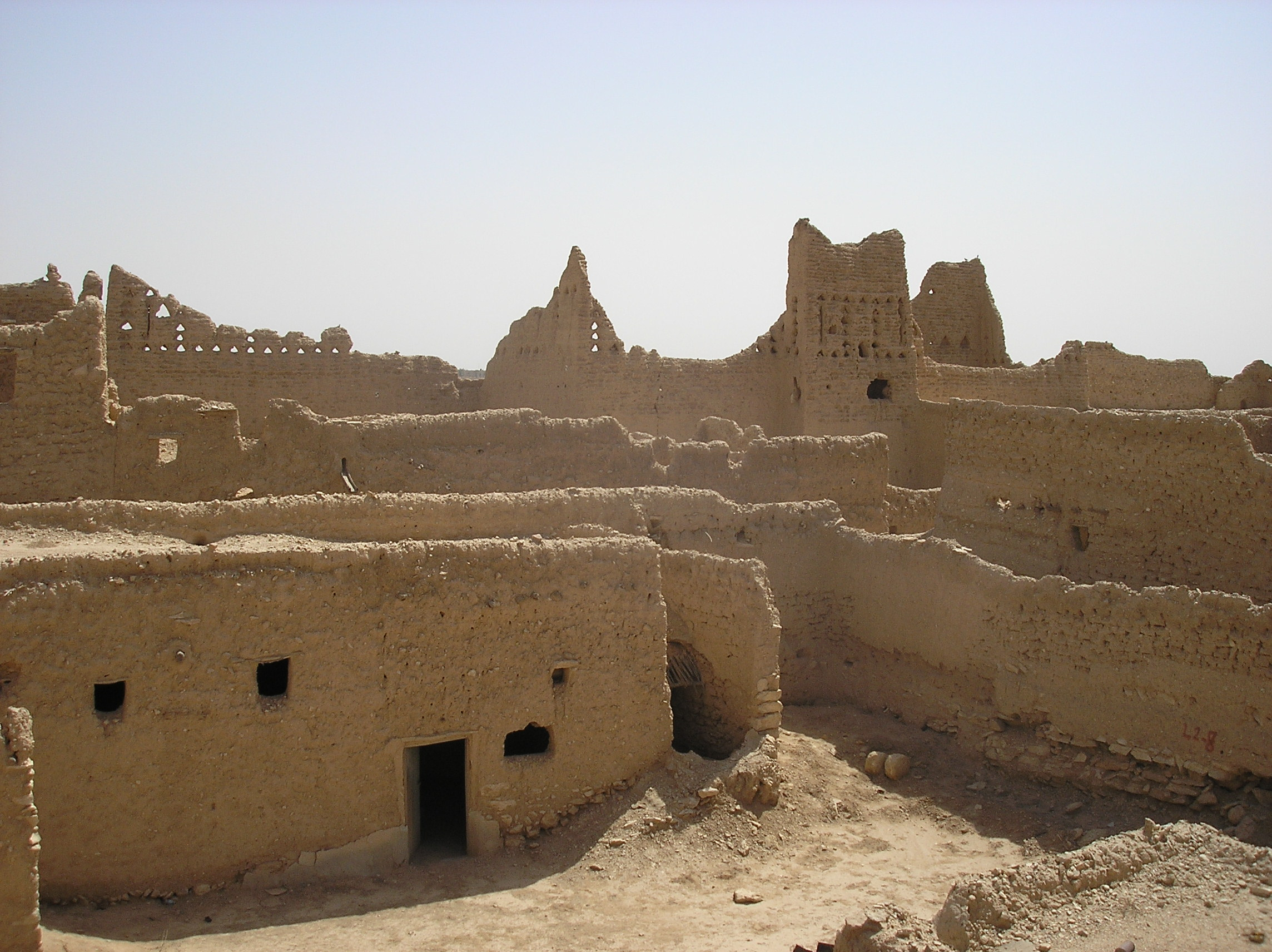
The ruins of Dir'iyah, capital city of the First Saudi state

After Ibn 'Abd al-Wahhab's death, Abdulaziz continued with his expansionist vision beyond the confines of Najd. Conquest expanded through the Arabian Peninsula until it conquered Mecca and Medina in the early 19th century. It was during this time that the Saudi political leadership began to emphasise the doctrine of offensive Jihad by reviving the fatwas of the medieval Hanbali theologian Taqi al-Din Ibn Taymiyya (d. 1328 C.E/ 728 A.H). Ibn Taymiyya had declared self-professed Muslims who do not strictly adhere to Islamic law or practised various acts of saint-veneration such as beseeching favours from the dead to be non-Muslims. More significantly, Ibn Taymiyya pronounced Takfir (excommunication) on regimes that didn't implement Shari'a (Islamic laws) and called for Muslims to unseat such rulers through armed Jihad. These fatwas were readily incorporated by Wahhabi clerics to justify Saudi military campaigns into Hejaz against the Sharifs of Mecca. One of their most noteworthy and controversial attacks was on the Shia-majority city of Karbala in 1802. According to Wahhabi chronicler 'Uthman b. 'Abdullah b. Bishr; the Saudi armies killed many of its inhabitants, plundered its wealth and distributed amongst the populace. By 1805, the Saudi armies had taken control of Mecca and Medina.

As early as the 19th century, the newly ascending Ottoman-Saudi conflict had pointed to a clash between two national identities. In addition to doctrinal differences, Wahhabi resentment of Ottoman Empire was also based on pan-Arab sentiments and reflected concerns over the contemporary state of affairs wherein Arabs held no political sovereignty. Wahhabi poetry and sources expressed strong disdain for the Turkish identity of the Ottoman ruling class. While justifying their wars under religious banner, another major objective was to replace Turkish hegemony with the rule the Arabs. Socio-politically, the Muwahhidun movement represented the first major Arab-led protest against various Turkish, Persian and other non-Arab empires that dominated the Islamic world since the Mongol invasions and the fall of Abbasid Caliphate in the 13th century; and would later serve as a revolutionary impetus for pan-Arab political activists of the late 19th-century.

The British Empire had also come into conflict with various Arab sultanates in the Gulf during the 1800s. British commercial interests in the Gulf region were being challenged by what they labelled as "pirate" tribes who had been in nominal alliance with the Emirate of Dirʿiyya. The early 19th century was also marked by the emergence of British naval hegemony in the Gulf region. During this period, naval forces of Qawasim stationed in the Gulf carried out numerous attacks against British warships and merchant vessels.

=== Fall of Emirate of Dir'iyah ===
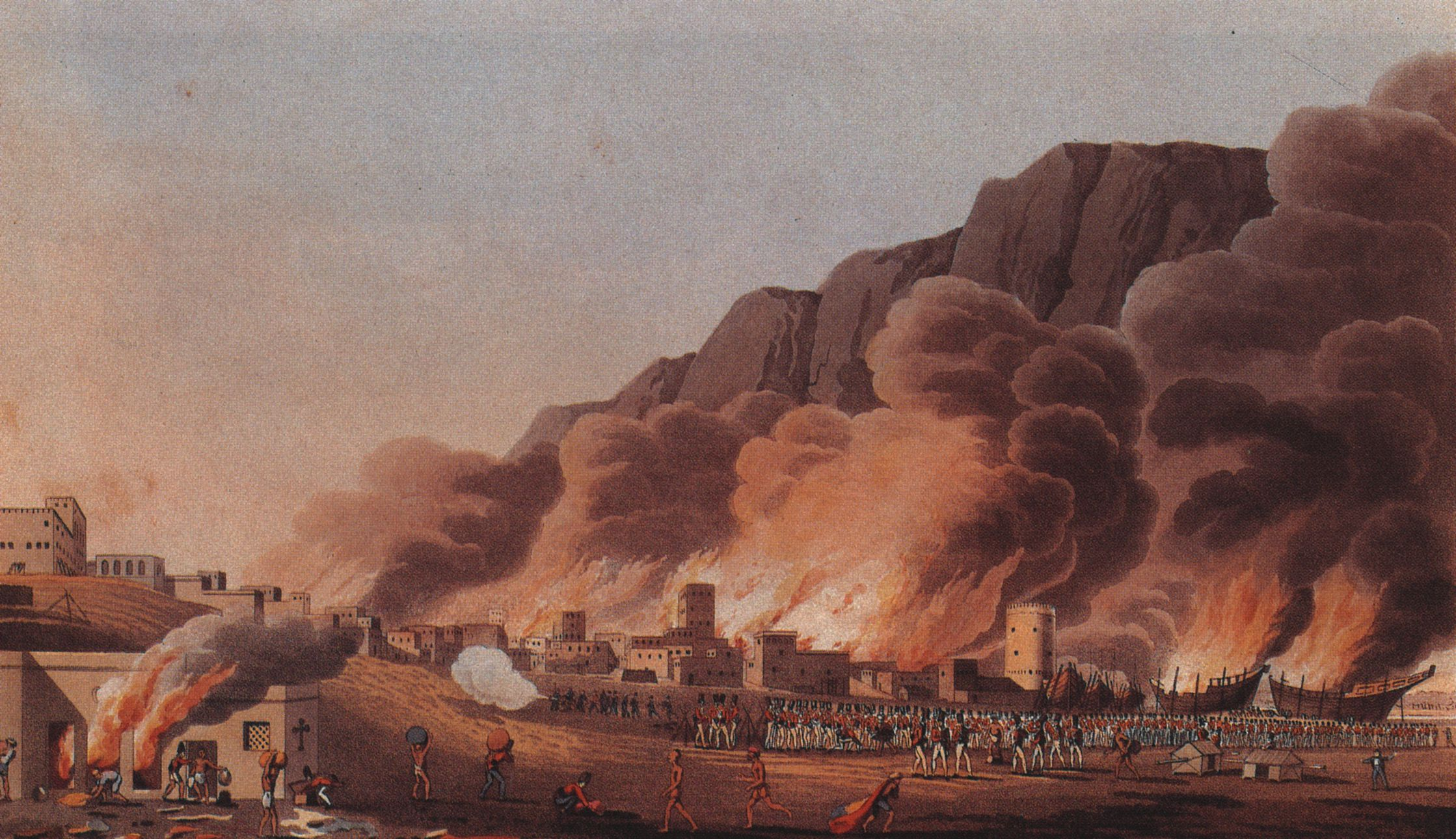
British Expeditionary forces sacking the coastal city of Ras al-Khaimah in December 1809

The Ottoman authorities, perceiving the Wahhabis as a rising challenge to their hegemony and suspicious of the ambitious Muhammad Ali of Egypt, instructed him to fight the Wahhabis, as the defeat of either would be beneficial to them. Tensions between Muhammad Ali and his troops also prompted him to send them to Arabia and fight against the Emirate of Diriyah where many were massacred. This led to the Ottoman-Saudi War. Ottoman Egypt, led by Ibrahim Pasha, was eventually successful in defeating the Saudis in a campaign starting from 1811. In 1818 they defeated Al Saud, leveling the capital Diriyah, slaughtering its inhabitants, executing the Al-Saud emir and exiling the emirate's political and religious leadership, and unsuccessfully attempted to stamp out not just the House of Saud but the Wahhabi mission as well.

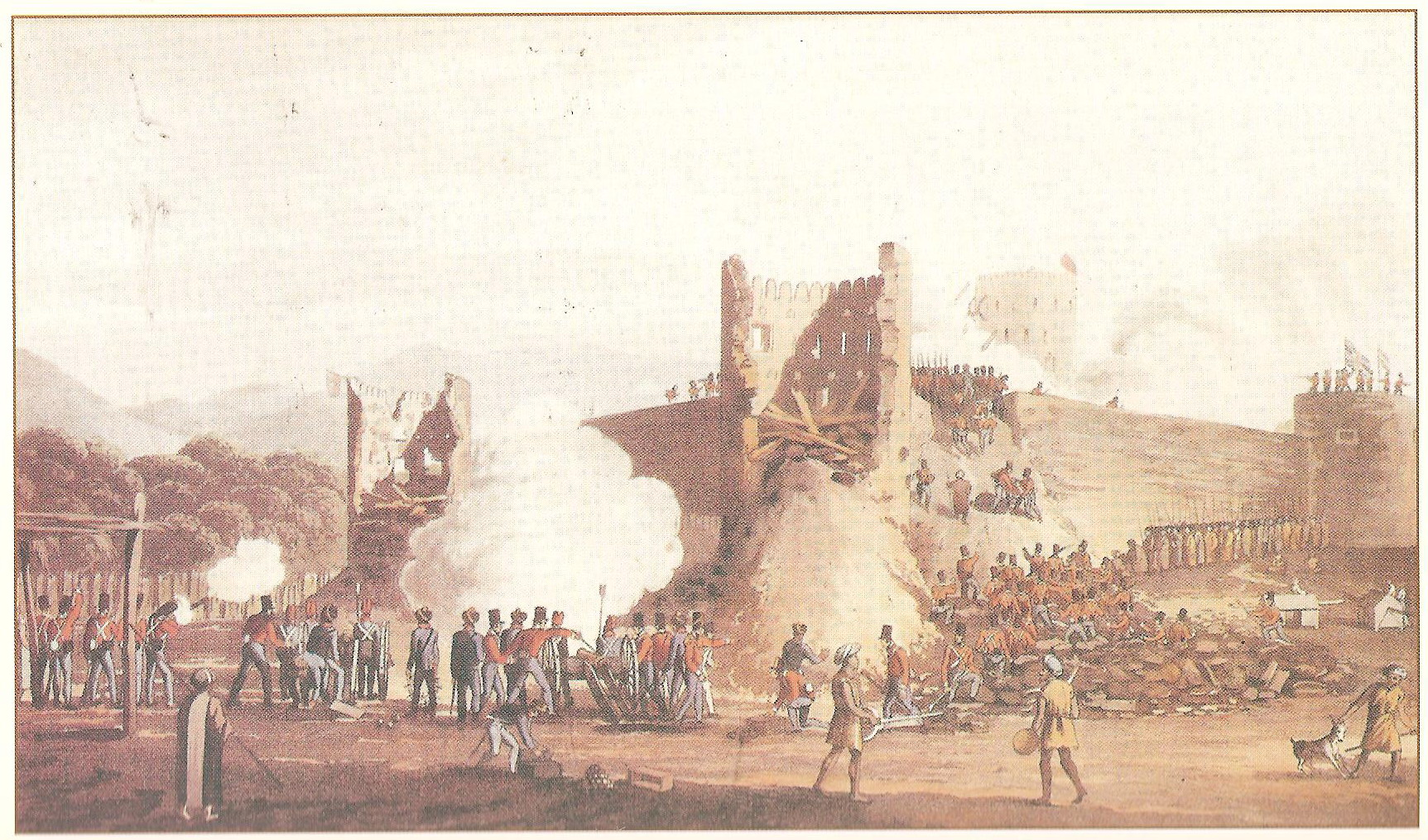
Fall of Ras al-Khaimah to the British troops during the Persian Gulf Campaign of 1819

The British Empire welcomed Ibrahim Pasha's capture of Diriyah, as it aligned with their goal of promoting trade interests in the region. Captain George Forster Sadleir, a British military officer in India, was dispatched from Bombay to consult with Ibrahim Pasha in Diriyah. After the British war against the Emirate of Ras al-Khaimah in 1809, Wahhabi rulers of Dirʿiyya had negotiated a truce with the British on behalf of their Qawasim allies, promising to restrain them from attacking British naval assets or initiating hosilities against the British. With the fall of Emirate of Dirʿiyya and the fall of the Maratha Empire in India, the officials of the East India Company decided to amass forces for their Persian Gulf campaign of 1819. A major military expedition was sent to fight the Qawasim dynasty and their domain Ras al Khaimah was destroyed in 1819. The General Maritime treaty was concluded in 1820 with the local chieftains, which would eventually transform them into a protectorate of Trucial States; heralding a century of British domination in the Gulf.

== Second Saudi State (1824–1891) ==
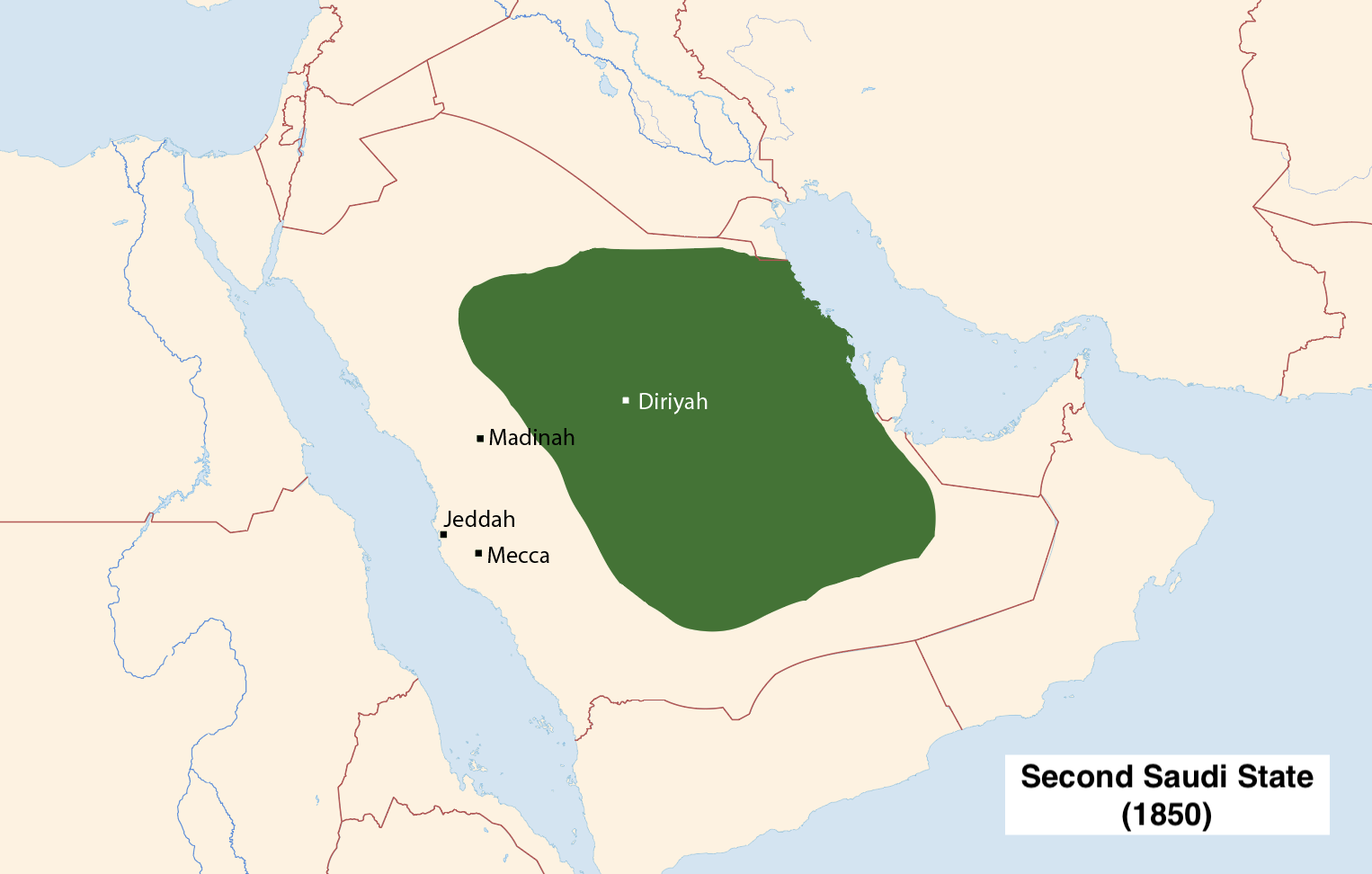
The Second Saudi state in 1850

A second, smaller Saudi state, the Emirate of Nejd, lasted from 1824 to 1891. Its borders being within Najd; Wahhabism was protected from further Ottoman or Egyptian campaigns by Najd's isolation, lack of valuable resources, and that era's limited communication and transportation. By the 1880s, at least amongst the townsmen if not Arabian Bedouins, Wahhabism had become the predominant religious culture of the regions in Najd.

Unlike early leaders like Ibn 'Abd al-Wahhab and his son 'Abdullah who had advocated dialogue and education as the most effective approach to reformation; the later scholars of the Muwahhidun preferred a militant approach. Following the Ottoman destruction of Diriyah and suppression of reformist trends regarded as a threat to the religious establishment, the later Muwahhidun launched a decades long insurgency in Central Arabia and became radicalised. Absence of capable scholarship after the death of Ibn 'Abd al-Wahhab in 1792, also marked this shift. In this era, the Muwahhidun revived many ideas of the medieval theologian Ibn Taymiyya, including doctrines such as Al-Wala wal Bara (loyalty and disassociation) which conceptualised a binary division of world into believers and non-believers. Whilst this phrase was absent in the 18th century Wahhabi literature, it became a central feature of the 19th century Wahhabi dogma.

Thus, during much of the second half of the 19th century, there was a strong aversion to mixing with "idolaters" (including most of the inhabitants of the Muslim world) in Wahhabi lands. At the very least, voluntary contact was considered sinful by Wahhabi clerics, and if one enjoyed the company of idolaters, and "approved of their religion", it was considered an act of unbelief. Travel outside the pale of Najd to the Ottoman lands "was tightly controlled, if not prohibited altogether". Over the course of their history, the Muwahhidun became more accommodating towards the outside world. In the late 1800s, Wahhabis found other Muslims with similar beliefs – first with Ahl-i Hadith in South Asia, and later with Islamic revivalists in Arab states (one being Mahmud Sahiri al-Alusi in Baghdad).

Around this period, many remote tribes of Central Arabia re-introduced the practice of idolatry and superstitious folk rituals. During his official visit to Arabia in 1865, British Lieutenant General Lewis Pelly noted that most of the Central Arabian tribes were ignorant of basic Islamic tenets and were practising animism. Finnish explorer George August Wallin who travelled Northern Arabia during the 1840s writes in his Notes (1848):

"most of the tribes which were not forced to adopt the reformed doctrines of the Wahhâbiyé (Wahábiyeh) sect during the period of its ascendant power in Arabia... are, in general, grossly ignorant in the religion they profess, and I scarcely remember ever meeting with a single individual... who observed any of the rites of Islâm whatever, or possessed the last notion of its fundamental and leading dogmas; while the reverse might, to a certain degree, be said of those Bedooins who are, or formerly were, Wahhâbiyé (Wahábiyeh)."

== Classical Wahhabiyya (19th-Century) ==
Although the Wahhabi movement shared the core doctrinal themes of other Salafi and proto-Salafi movements, it would later diverge with them in certain points of theology. These included a zealous tendency toward takfir, i.e., excommunication of Muslims who opposed them and held beliefs which they regarded as shirk (polytheism). This hardening of dogmatism dates as early as 1773, when Muhammad Ibn `Abd al-Wahhab withdrew from public life due to his dispute with 'Abd al-aziz, son and successor of Emir Muhammad Ibn Saud (1727–1765), over his ambitions to expand territorial conquests and his need to religiously justify these state activities as Jihad. For Ibn 'Abd al-Wahhab, state formation and aggressive expansionism were not the central themes of his revivalist and reformist efforts. The Saudi-Wahhabi power had reached its peak between 1792 and 1814, after Ibn 'Abd al-Wahhab's death in 1792. During this period, the Wahhabi clerics, Ibn 'Abd al-Wahhab's descendants, had become a tool of Saudi state expansionist policies and had heavily begun to incorporate the political doctrines of Hanbali theologian Ibn Taymiyya. This shift in outlook would lead to brutal events like the Wahhabi sack of Karbala in 1802–1803 and bitter conquests of the early nineteenth century. After the destruction of Emirate of Diriyah in 1818, the Saudis would lead a decades-long insurgency in Najd against the Ottomans, and the Wahhabi ulema adopted certain legal views on migration (hijra), excommunication (takfir), and religious warfare (jihad) as core theological doctrines, to justify it. This was in stark contrast to Ibn 'Abd al-Wahhab's writings, to whom Jihad played a limited role in-line with the classical Islamic military jurisprudence, which stipulated the limitations of military engagement. The classical Wahhabi emphasize on Takfir, Jihad, Hijra, etc. would lead to homogenisation of religious thought and practices in the Saudi territories throughout the nineteenth century.

Muhammad ibn 'Abd al-Wahhab and his later followers were subject to criticism, including by the Palestinian Hanbali scholar al-Saffārīnī (d. 1188 AH/1774 CE), and also through unverified reports by Yemeni Islamic scholar Muḥammad ibn Ismāʿīl al-Amīr al Ṣanʿānī (d. 1182–1768), etc. for the actions of the Saudi state and their extremism in Takfir. Although the influential Yemeni reformer al-Shawkani praised Ibn 'Abd al-Wahhab and his works, after his death, Shawkani would criticise Ibn 'Abd al-Wahhab's later followers for their harshness in takfir. After the destruction of First Saudi State in 1223 C.E /1818 A.H, Wahhabi movement was characterised by manifesting hostility to non-Wahhābī Muslims. This phase of the movement between the 1820s to 1930, is generally known as "Classical Wahhabism". Classical Wahhabis themselves were divided between moderate scholars of Northern Najd like Muhammad Ibn Ibrahim Ibn Ajlan, Ibrāhīm ibn Ḥamad ibn Jāsir (d. 1338–1919), ʿAbdallāh ibn ʿAlī ibn ʿAmr (d. 1326–1908) etc. who were more open to outsiders and doctrinarian Wahhabis of Southern regions like 'Abd al-Latif ibn Abd Al-Rahman Hassan, Hamad ibn 'Atiq, Sulayman ibn Sihman, etc. who were more harsh in Takfir. To the moderate factions, conservative Wahhabis were extremists in takfir and therefore a dangerous threat to the Muslim Ummah. The two factions engaged in fierce debates, and due to political power-struggles, the hardline factions were able to gain dominance. In Syria, until the late nineteenth century emergence of Salafiyya, Wahhabi calls were met with hostility from the ulema due to doctrinal and political reasons. Although the Ahl-i Hadith ulema of the Indian subcontinent had associated with Arab Wahhabi scholars and taught them, in their reports to the British, they officially denied any Wahhabi influence.

The major precursor to the Takfiri discourse of Classical Wahhabism was Sulayman ibn 'Abdullah Aal al-Shaykh (1785–1818), a grandson of Ibn 'Abd al-Wahhab, who responded harshly to the Ottoman invasion. Ibn 'Abd al-Wahhab had been focused on reformist efforts in the Arabian Peninsula, primarily through preaching and mass-education. However, later Wahhabis would also come into political conflict with Ottomans, sparking a new array of polemics. Sulayman formulated the basis for a new concept of Takfir, based on the re-conceptualisation of the works of Ibn Taymiyya and Ibn 'Abd al-Wahhab and applied it in his context on the Ottoman Empire. While Ibn 'Abd al-Wahhab had focused on criticising specific beliefs and practices which he regarded heretical, Sulayman began to denounce groups and sects en masse. Sulayman revived Ibn Taymiyya's ideas of Al-Wala wal-Bara (loyalty and disavowal) and integrated it as a major part of his expanded Takfir doctrine. Most significantly, Sulayman also excommunicated whoever supported the Ottomans, ignores their disbelief or approves of them. He also forbade travel to Ottoman lands since those lands, in his view, were polytheist lands (Dar al-Harb). Through his various treatises, Sulayman employed the Islamic concept of Hijra and applied it on the Ottomans, asserting that it was obligatory for Muslims to abandon Ottoman lands and travel to Saudi lands.

Sulayman would be executed by the Ottomans following the collapse of Emirate of Dir'iyyah in 1818. Second Saudi State was established in 1824 and its early scholars like Abd al-Rahman ibn Hassan (d. 1868) had followed a milder approach to Takfir. However, during the civil wars of the 1860s and 1870s, Sulayman's Takfiri doctrines would be revived by scholars like Abd al-Latif ibn Abd al-Rahman Hassan (1810–1876), his student Hammad ibn 'Atiq (d. 1884) and his son 'Abdullah ibn 'Abd al-Latif (d. 1920). Breaking with mainstream discourse that maintained a moderate approach until 1869, 'Abd al-Latif re-explored the fatwas of past scholars like Ibn Taymiyya on the doctrines of Takfir, Hijra, Al wala wal Bara, etc. in the wake of Ottoman expedition to Hasa. Sensing danger to the Emirate of Nejd, Abd al-Latif deployed his Takfiri doctrines to ensure loyalty and enable mass-mobilization against external enemies like the Ottomans, British, etc. as well as against internal enemies like Rafida (extreme Shi'ites). Another prominent figure was Hammad ibn 'Atiq, the most rigorous and implacable of anti-Ottoman clerics. As a pupil of 'Abd al-Latif, Ibn 'Atiq weaponised the doctrines of Al-Wala wal Bara and excommunicated the people inhabiting majority of the lands outside of Najd including Hejaz. After the death of his father in 1876, 'Abdullah Aal al-Shaykh became the senior-most scholar and continued the Takfiri polemics of Sulayman and 'Abd al-Latif until his demise in 1920. Most of the Wahhabi pronouncements of Takfir during this era was motivated by political opportunism and many clerics like 'Abd al-Latif shifted sides multiple times; despite previously accusing the other parties of disbelief and inciting Fitna (corruption).

Scholars like 'Abd al-Latif Aal al-Shaykh displayed ambivalent approaches to excommunication. While in some situations they were harsh in their anathemization of political opponents, in other instances they expressed moderate views. In response to the allegations of Sufi scholar Ibn Jirjis, Abd al-Latif would reiterate that Wahhabis were cautious in limiting the pronouncements of Takfir as much as possible, stating:

"Shaykh Muḥammad was from the greatest of people in withholding and desisting from applying (the judgement of) kufr, until he would not be resolute upon the takfīr of the ignorant person who called upon other than Allāh from the inhabitants of the graves or other than them when one who could advise him and make such proof be conveyed to him – the abandoner of which would fall into disbelief – was not readily available to him... And he had been asked about the likes of these ignorant people and he affirmed that the one upon whom the proof had been established and was capable of knowing the proof, he is the one who disbelieves by worshipping the graves"

== Relations with Early Ahl-i Hadith scholars ==
The precursor of the South Asian 19th century Ahl-i Hadith movement, Ṭarīqa-i Muḥammadiyya was already denounced by its Sufi opponents as "Wahhabi"; a designation readily adopted by the British. Throughout their treatises, the Ahl-i Hadith scholars of South Asia denied the accusations of them being "Wahhabi". Siddīq Hăsán Khān (1832–1890), a prominent leader of Ahl-i Hadith wrote the treatise Tarjumān al-wahhābiyya (Interpreter of the Wahhabiyya), distinguishing themselves from the Wahhabis, since they "followed the school of Aḥmad b. Ḥanbal, whereas the Ahl-i Ḥadīth did not practice taqlīd". While hailing Ibn Taymiyya as a Mujaddid and Mujtahid, these early Ahl-i Hadith scholars nonetheless criticised Wahhabis as Muqallīdîn (blind-followers) of Ibn Taymiyya. While the leading ulema of the early Ahl-i Ḥadīth like Ṣiddīq Ḥasan Khān, Muḥammad Ḥusayn Batʾālwī (1840–1920), Thanāʾ Allāh Amritsarī (1867–1948), etc., officially denied any relations with followers of Ibn 'Abd al-Wahhab until the 1920s, other Ahl-i Hadith figures like ʿAbd al-Wāḥid, ʿAbd al-Raḥīm Ghaznawī, Bashīr Aḥmad Sahaswānī (d. 1908), etc., would stress their affinities with the Wahhabis.

The second half of the 19th century was a period when repercussions following the defeat of the Mujahidin movement of Sayyid Ahmad in Balakot were widespread in South Asia. Followers of Ahl-i Hadith were being persecuted and punished for various practices, such as saying "Ameen" loudly in Salah (prayer rituals). As an Islamic scholar who was able to attain a position of high political authority, Ahl-i Hadith leader Siddīq Hasan Khān had faced several rivals as well as threats from British officials who charged him with spreading Wahhabi doctrines, which had been criminalised in the British Raj. Since Khan was unable to defend Muhammad Ibn 'Abd al-Wahhab and doctrines of the Najdi Wahhabis, his main concern was to protect the Muwahhidin (Ahl-i Hadith) in India, who were accused of being Wahhabis. He argued that the beliefs of Ahl-i Hadith of India were based on Qur'an and Sunnah, and was not derived from Najdi scholars; attempting to distinguish them from the Ahl-i Hadith. Yet Khan had also rebutted various claims made against Wahhabism, by bringing up Ibn 'Abd al-Wahhab's responses as well as defenses made by various supporters of the movement.

In his treatise Tarjuman-i-Wahabiyah ("Interpreter of the Wahhabiyya"), Khan defended himself from being labelled as "Wahhabi" and would criticise the usage of the term, due to its narrow, localised connotations. He began the treatise by fiercely criticising the Najdi Wahhabis for stamping out Islamic Universalism with territorial localism. According to Khan, Najdis pulled Muslims back to constraints of geographic identitarianism and rigid norms and resented their territorial marker. He cited the discomfort of the Prophet to any type of regionalisation of Islam. He also cited the famous Hadith of Najd as a rebuttal of Najdis. According to Siddīq Hăsán Khān, Prophet Muhammad refused to bless Najd because:

"This [would] only create strife and raise unnecessary issue[s] and [would] offer an ideal playing field for the Satan [to create strife in the Muslim world]."

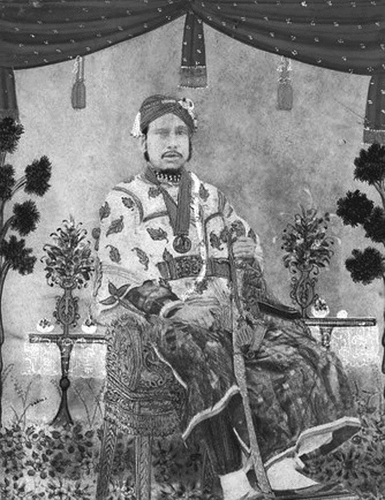
Photo of Ahl-i Hadith scholar Siddiq Hasan Khan, who taught numerous religious students from the Emirate of Nejd under his madrasa in the Bhopal State. His disciples included Sa'ad ibn 'Atiq, son of senior cleric Hammad ibn 'Atiq, who later became the qadi of Riyadh in the Third Saudi State

Giving a resume of the career and activities of Muhammad ibn 'Abd al-Wahhab, Khan pointed out that there was no link between his activities and those of Sayyid Ahmad. Tracing the rise and subsequent defeat of the Muwahhidun movement in the Arabian Peninsula in 1818, Khan asserts that followers of Ibn 'Abd al-Wahhab and Sayyid Ahmad were labelled "Wahhabis" due to ulterior motives of imperial powers. Since the works of the Arabian reformer were not published by the followers of Sayyid Ahmad, labelling them as "Wahhabis" was a policy of religio-political abuse. Khan asserts that the apt term for Sayyid Ahmad's followers was Ahl al-Hadith (followers of the Hadith), since the term was as old as the early eras of Islam.

In another one of his works titled "Hidayat al Saa'il Ila Adillatil Masaa'il"; Khan elaborated that Sunni Muslims of Hindustan were different from the Najdis since they both belonged to different madhahib (legal schools). The Najdis where the followers of the madh'hab of Imam Ahmad, whereas in Hindustan; Hanafi school was dominant. Past scholars like Shah Waliullah Dehlawi, Shah Ismail, etc. had reformed Hanafi doctrines from bid'ah (innovations) and held it tightly around Qur'an and Hadith. Articulating his pan-Islamic vision, Siddīq Hăsán Khān states that the broader scope of Hindustani ulema cannot be contained by adherence to a single leader like Muhammad Ibn 'Abd al-Wahhab who was territorially rooted and therefore was outside of the cultural and intellectual space of an organic vision of Muslim unity. By asserting that the Ahl-i Hadith reform movement could not be labelled "Wahabis" as the latter were ideologically and territorially rooted in the Najd; Khan delinked his followers from the Najdī associates. Despite this, British officials charged that Khan's literature lead to the spread of "Wahhabi intrusion" into the Indian military. Ironically, both Tarjuman-i-Wahabiyah and Hidayat al Saa'il Ila Adillatil Masaa'il, which were critical of Najdi Wahhabis, would be labelled as "seditious" books and censured by the British administration.

=== Tutelage under Ahl-i Hadith and Impact ===
In spite of his officially critical stance on the Najdi movement, several Najdi Wahhabi religious students would travel to the Islamic Principality of Bhopal and study Hadith under its Nawab Siddiq Hasan Khan's tutelage. Several Najdi Wahhabi treatises such as Fath al-Majid by Abdurrahman ibn Hasan Aal al-Shaykh, Tathirul A'tekad by Ibn Ismāʿīl al-Amīr al-San'ani, etc. had been brought to Sīddïq Hasān Khán as early as 1881. The studies of Najdi religious students under Khan would make a profound impact on the Wahhabi approach to Fiqh (Islamic jurisprudence). After their studies under the Ahl-i Hadith ulema of India, Wahhabi scholars from Najd adopted the legal methodology of Ibn Taymiyya and Ibn Qayyim; and began extensively referring to their theological works, fatwas and legal treatises, which had not been available to them before.

== Formation of Kingdom of Saudi Arabia ==
Territorial expansion and iterations of the third Saudi State (Arabic: الدولة السعودية الثالثة) * Emirate of Riyadh 1902–1913 * Emirate of Nejd and Hasa 1913–1921 * Sultanate of Nejd 1921–1926 * Kingdom of Hejaz and Nejd 1926–1932 * Kingdom of Saudi Arabia 1932–present

=== Ibn Saud ===
In 1901, 'Abd Al-aziz Ibn Saud, a fifth generation descendant of Muhammad ibn Saud, began a military campaign that led to the conquest of much of the Arabian peninsula and the founding of present-day Saudi Arabia, after the collapse of the Ottoman Empire. During this period, the Wahhabi scholars began allying with the cause of the Sunni reformist ulema of the Arab East, such as Jamal al-Din Qasimi, Tahir al Jaza'iri, Khayr al-Din Alusi, etc. who were major figures of the early Salafiyya movement. The revivalists and Wahhabis shared a common interest in Ibn Taymiyya's thought, the permissibility of ijtihad, and the need to purify worship practices of innovation. In the 1920s, Sayyid Rashid Rida (d. 1935 C.E/ 1354 A.H), a pioneer Arab Salafist whose periodical al-Manar was widely read in the Muslim world, published an "anthology of Wahhabi treatises", and a work praising the Ibn Saud as "the savior of the Haramayn [the two holy cities] and a practitioner of authentic Islamic rule".

The core feature of Rida's treatises was the call for revival of the pristine Islamic beliefs and practices of the Salaf and glorification of the early generations of Muslims, and condemnation of every subsequent ritual accretion as bid'ah (religious heresy). Reviving the fundamentalist teachings of Ibn Taymiyya, Rida also advocated the political restoration of an Islamic Caliphate that would unite the Muslim Ummah as necessary for maintaining a virtous Islamic society. Rashid Rida's campaigns for pan-Islamist revival through Ibn Taymiyya's doctrines would grant Wahhabism mainstream acceptance amongst the cosmopolitan Arab elite, once dominated by Ottomanism.

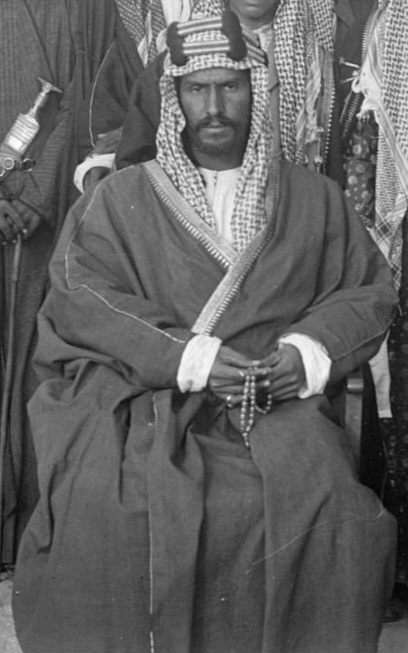
Ibn Saud, the first king of Saudi Arabia circa. 1910

Under the reign of Abdulaziz, "political considerations trumped" doctrinal idealism favored by pious Wahhabis. His political and military success gave the Wahhabi ulama control over religious institutions with jurisdiction over considerable territory, and in later years Wahhabi ideas formed the basis of the rules and laws concerning social affairs, and shaped the kingdom's judicial and educational policies. But protests from Wahhabi ulamah were overridden when it came to consolidating power in Hijaz and al-Hasa, maintaining a positive relationship with the British government, adopting modern technology, establishing a simple governmental administrative framework, or signing an oil concession with the U.S. The Wahhabi ulama also issued a fatwa affirming that "only the ruler could declare a jihad" (a violation of Ibn Abd al-Wahhab's teaching, according to DeLong-Bas).

As the realm of Wahhabism expanded under Ibn Saud into Shiite areas (al-Hasa, conquered in 1913) and Hejaz (conquered in 1924–25), radical factions amongst Wahhabis such as the Ikhwan pressed for forced conversion of Shia and an eradication of (what they saw as) idolatry. Ibn Saud sought "a more relaxed approach". In al-Hasa, efforts to stop the observance of Shia religious holidays and replace teaching and preaching duties of Shia clerics with Wahhabi, lasted only a year. In Mecca and Jeddah (in Hejaz) prohibition of tobacco, alcohol, playing cards and listening to music on the phonograph was looser than in Najd. Over the objections of some of his clergymen, Ibn Saud permitted both the driving of automobiles and the attendance of Shia at hajj. Enforcement of the commanding right and forbidding wrong, such as enforcing prayer observance, Islamic sex-segregation guidelines, etc. developed a prominent place during the Third Saudi emirate, and in 1926 a formal committee for enforcement was founded in Mecca.

=== Ikhwan rebellion (1927–1930) ===
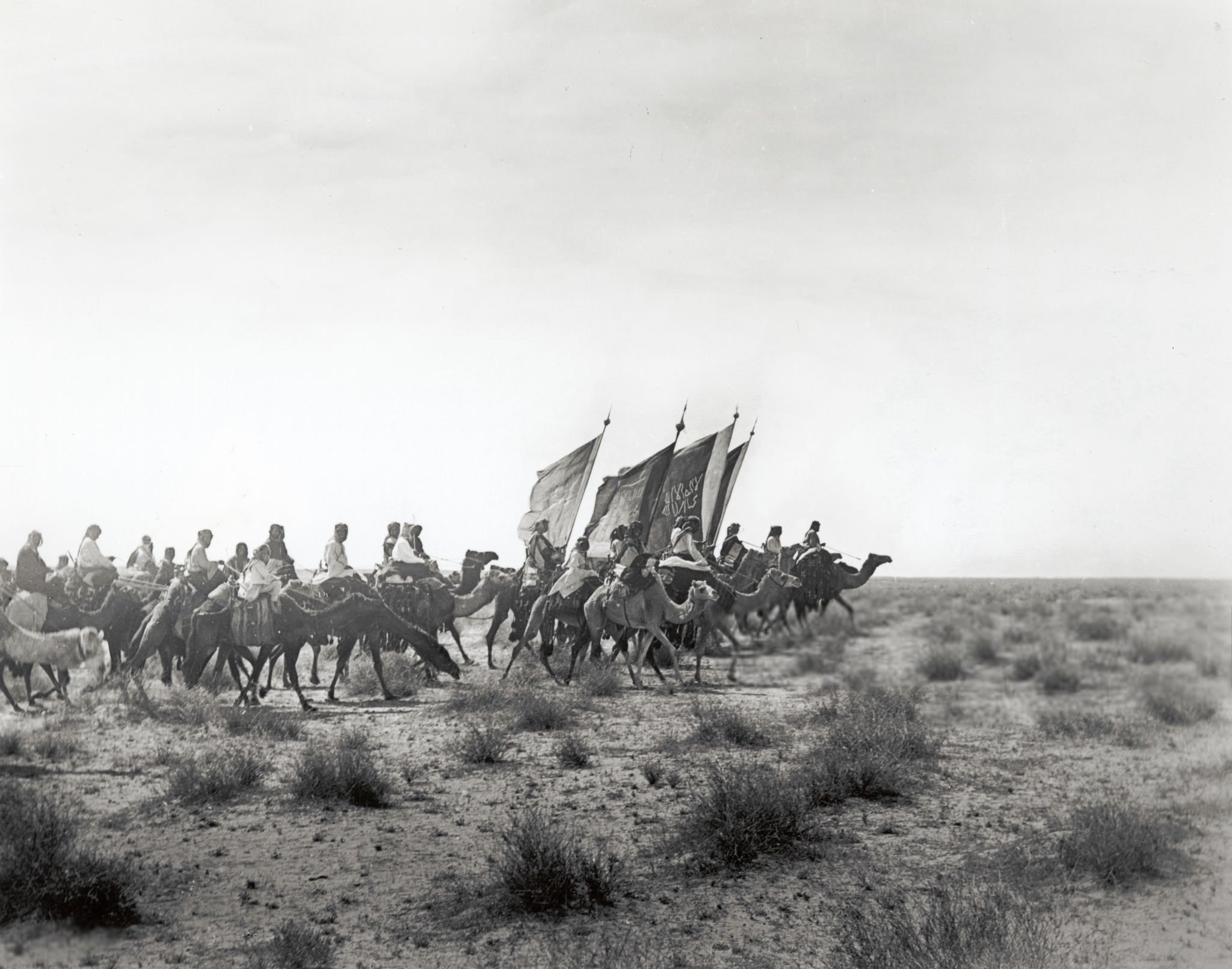
Soldiers of the Ikhwan army

While Wahhabi warriors swore loyalty to monarchs of Al Saud, there was one major rebellion. King Abd al-Azez put down rebelling Ikhwan – nomadic tribesmen turned Wahhabi warriors who opposed his "introducing such innovations as telephones, automobiles, and the telegraph" and his "sending his son to a country of unbelievers (Egypt)". Britain had warned Abd al-aziz when the Ikhwan attacked the British protectorates of Transjordan, Iraq and Kuwait, as a continuation of jihad to expand the Wahhabist realm.

Ikhwan consisted of Bedouin tribesmen who believed they were entitled to free-lance Jihad, raiding, etc. without permission of the Amir and they had conflicts with both Wahhabi ulema and Saudi rulers. They also objected to Saudi taxations on nomadic tribes. After their raids against Saudi townsmen, Ibn Saud went for a final showdown against the Ikhwan with the backing of the Wahhabi ulema in 1929. The Ikhwan was decisively defeated and sought the backing of foreign rulers of Kuwait and British Empire. In January 1930, the main body of Ikhwan surrendered to the British near the Saudi-Kuwaiti border. The Wahhabi movement was perceived as an endeavour led by the settled populations of the Arabian Peninsula against the nomadic domination of trade-routes, taxes as well as their jahiliyya customs. Muhammad ibn Abd al-Wahhab had criticized the nomadic tribes and the Wahhabi chroniclers praised Saudi rulers for taming the Bedouins.

=== Establishment of Saudi Arabia ===
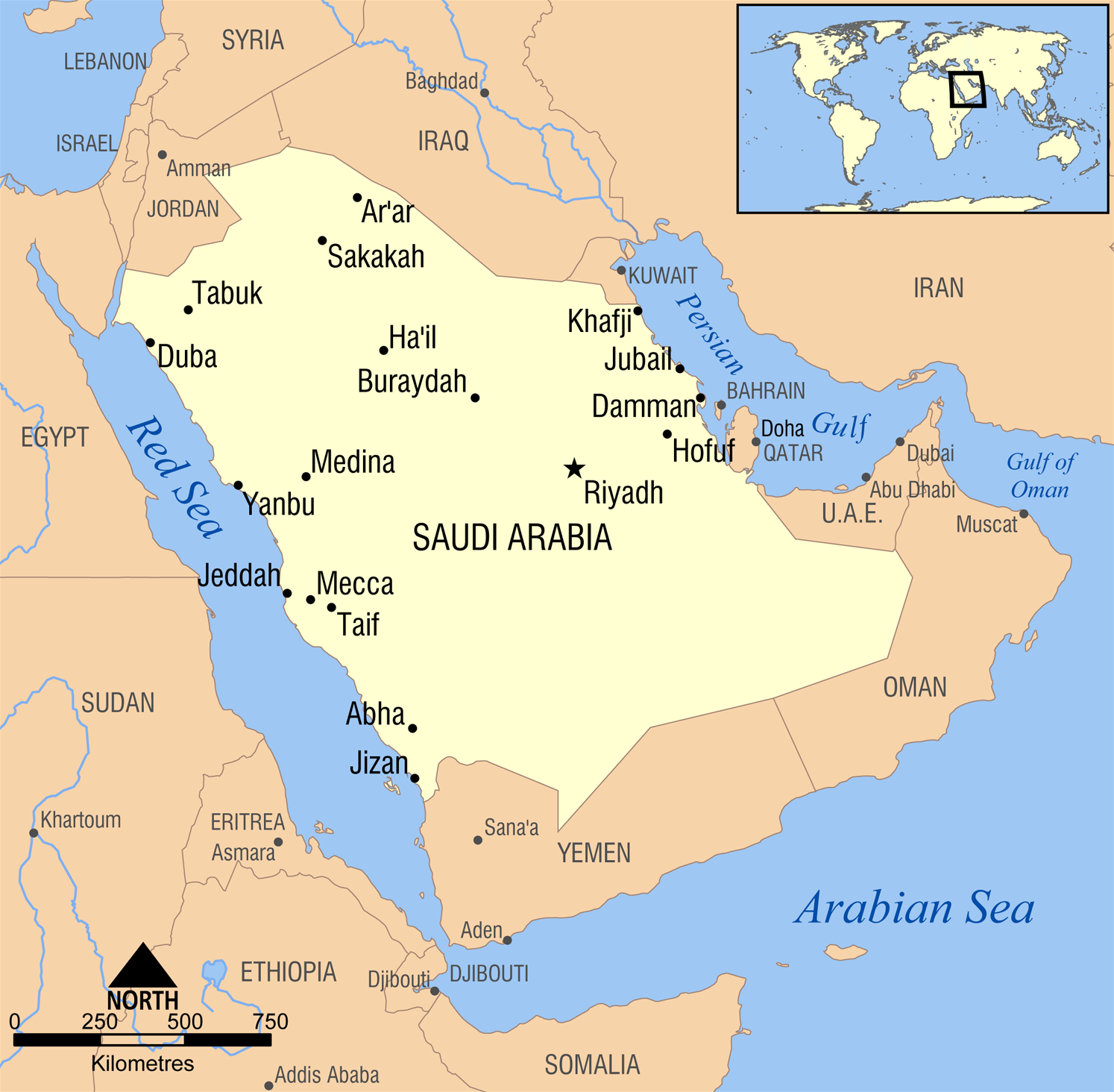
The Kingdom of Saudi Arabia after unification in 1932

In a bid "to join the Muslim mainstream and to erase the reputation of extreme sectarianism associated with the Ikhwan", in 1926 Ibn Saud convened a Muslim congress of representatives of Muslim governments and popular associations. By 1932, 'Abd al-Azeez and his armies were able to efficiently quell all rebellions and establish unchallenged authority in most regions of the Peninsula such as Hejaz, Nejd and Asir. After holding a special meeting of the members of Majlis al-Shura ( consultation council), 'Abd al-Azeez ibn Saud issued the decree "On the merger of the parts of the Arabian kingdom" on 18 September 1932; which announced the establishment of the Kingdom of Saudi Arabia, the fourth and current iteration of the Third Saudi State. Upon his death in 1953, Ibn Saud had implemented various modernisation reforms and technological innovations across the country; tempering the 19th century Wahhabi zeal. Acknowledging the political realities of the 20th century, a relenting Wahhabi scholarly establishment opened up to the outside world and attained religious acceptance amongst the wider Muslim community. Wahhabi ulama gained control over education, law, public morality and religious institutions in the 20th century; while incorporating new material and technological developments such as the import of modern communications; for the political consolidation of the Al-Saud dynasty and strengthening Saudi Arabia, the country that advocated Wahhabi doctrines as state policy.

== Rehabilitation of Wahhabism ==
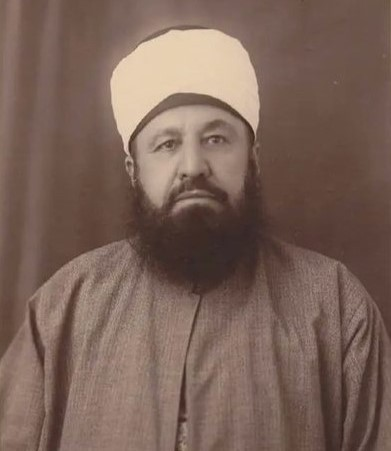
Efforts of Salafi scholar Muhammad Rashid Rida (Arabic: سيد رشيد رضا; 23 September 1865 – 22 August 1935) were crucial for the rehabilitation of Wahhabism across the Arab World in the early 20th-century

According to David Commins, the 19th century classical Wahhabi ideology was at the radical pole of Islamic discourse; whose doctrinal extremism in takfir provoked hostile condemnations among the ʿulamaʾ and Sufi shaykhs in the Arabian Peninsula and the Fertile Crescent. While rejecting the doctrinal excesses of Wahhabis in takfir; Salafis of Syria, Iraq and Egypt emphasized their common struggles against innovations like scholastic taqlid practices, rituals of saint worship, etc. With the support of the late 19th century Salafi ʿulamaʾ in the Fertile Crescent and Egypt, led by Sayyid Rashid Rida, major elements of puritanical Wahhabi philosophy, such as ijtihad and jihad, became an integral part of Islamic revivalism. They presented Wahhabism as an authentic revivalist movement, rather than a Kharijite heresy outside the Sunni consensus, by softening the harsh Wahhabi stances and making it more palatable to Arab Muslims. This also paved the way for co-operation between Salafi movements like the Muslim Brotherhood and the Wahhabis during the Interwar period, against the European threat and Western culture. Through this intellectual-political redefinition; Wahhabism was able to attain a global reach; and end its geographical and intellectual isolation by molding a receptive Salafi audience.

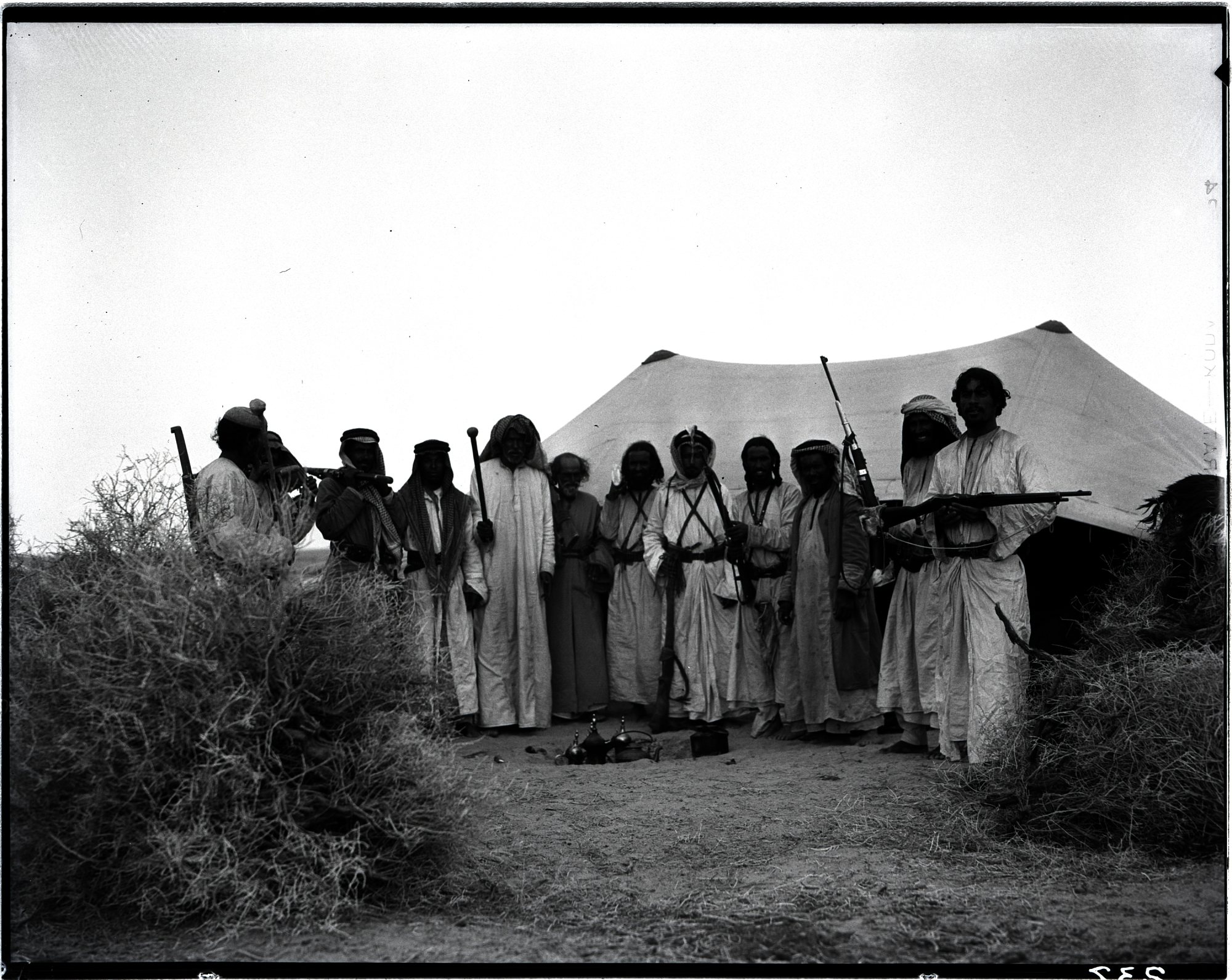
Photo of a group of Wahhabi soldiers dated 1935 C.E

The Rehabilitation of the Wahhabi movement was championed by the early Salafiyya under the leadership of Syrian-Egyptian Islamic scholar Muhammad Rashid Rida (d. 1935) who campaigned vigorously to defend Muhammad Ibn 'Abd al-Wahhab and his ideas. Aligning themselves with Rida's campaign, Wahhabis also began using Salafi epithets and themes with increasing recurrence, viewing it more empowering than previous self-labels like "good Sunnis" or "Unitarians" (muwaḥḥidūn). Some of Rida's disciples like Muhammad Al-Amin Al-Shanqiti felt that the rehabilitation campaign had gone too far in its uncritical promotion of Wahhabiyya. However, Rida rebutted Al-Shanqiti, accusing him of unfair criticism; and focused on facing the rising British threat. By 1929, Abd Al 'Azeez Ibn Saud had openly come out against the term "Wahhabi", instead emphasizing that they were part of the wider Salafiyya movement, to align themselves within the umbrella of mainstream Sunnism. With the death of Sulayman ibn Sihman in 1930, the old guard of Classical Wahhabis had died out. The new scholarship of Wahhabiyyah would be dominated by Rida's disciples and comrades, who while remaining conservative, never developed the hardline approach of Classical Wahhabism, instead representing the "true Wahhabism" Rida had been championing across the Islamic World. Overall, Rida's rehabilitation campaign was successful enough to give mainstream legitimacy for the Saudi leadership and its Wahhabi doctrines to the Islamic World, under the wider umbrella of the "Salafiyya" movement.

=== "Neo-Wahhabism" ===
The term "neo-Wahhabism" is sometimes used in academia. Rather than classical Wahhabi doctrines, the new brand of Wahhabism in Saudi Arabia was characterised by pan-Islamic Salafism, propagated through transnational religious organizations headquartered in the kingdom, with many of its leadership being foreign Salafis. The most influential amongst these organizations was the Muslim World League, established in 1962. Saudi Arabia financially supports Salafi centers, publications, and as such, Salafism remains closely aligned with the Saudi state and its religious establishment of Aal ash-Shaykh and generally reject allegiances to the four legal schools (madhhabs). Salafis continue to primarily follow the creedal teachings of Ibn 'Abd Al-Wahhab (d. 1792) and emphasize an idealised Saudi history, that romanticises the Wahhabi conquests. The Salafis also accept the multiple scholarly traditions of Islah (socio-legal-creedal reforms) dating from the 18th century, with a broader geographic scope ranging from Africa to South Asia, and is not tied to any particular state.

European Muslim intellectual Muhammad Asad (d. 1992) would praise the Wahhabi movement for its calls to the pristine message of the Prophet as well as its influence on future Islamic Renaissance movements. However, he noted the paradox of the movement; stating:

"Тhe spiritual meaning of Wahhabism – the striving after аn inner renewal of Muslim society – was corrupted almost at the same moment when its outer goal – the attainment of social and political power – was realized with the establishment of the Saudi Kingdom at the end of the eighteenth century and its ехpansion over the larger part of Arabia early in the nineteenth. As soon as the followers of Muhammad ibn Abd al-Wahhab achieved power, his idea became a mummy: for the spirit cannot be a servant of power – and power does not want to be servant of the spirit. Тhe history of Wahhab Najd is the history of a religious idea which first rose on the wings of enthusiasm and longing and then sank down into the lowlands of pharisaic self-righteousness. For all virtue destroys itself as soon as it ceases to be longing and humility"

== Alliance with Islamists ==
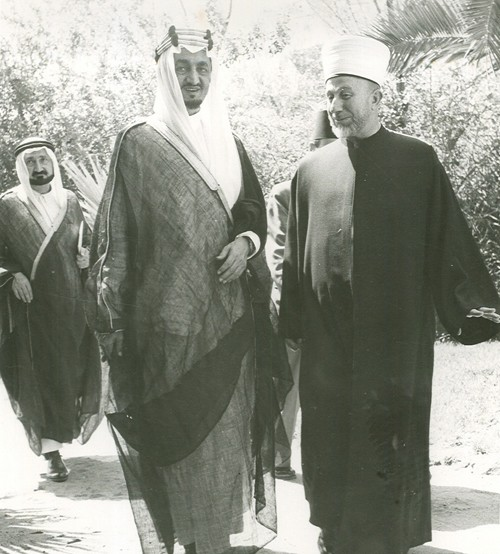
King Faisal with pan-Islamist leader Hajji Amin al-Husseini, former Grand Mufti of Jerusalem

A major current in regional politics at that time was secular nationalism, which, with Gamal Abdel Nasser, was sweeping the Arab world. To combat it, Wahhabi missionary outreach worked closely with Saudi foreign policy initiatives. In May 1962, a conference in Mecca organized by Saudis discussed ways to combat secularism and socialism. In its wake, the World Muslim League was established. To propagate Islam and "repel inimical trends and dogmas", the League opened branch offices around the globe. It developed closer association between Wahhabis and leading Salafis, and made common cause with the Islamic revivalist Muslim Brotherhood, Ahl-i Hadith and the Jamaat-i Islami, combating Sufism and "innovative" popular religious practices and rejecting the West and Western "ways which were so deleterious of Muslim piety and values".

Missionaries were sent to West Africa, where the League funded schools, distributed religious literature, and gave scholarships to attend Saudi religious universities. One result was the Izala Society which fought Sufism in Nigeria, Chad, Niger, and Cameroon. In South Asia, Muslim scholar Syed Abul A'la Maududi (1903–1979 C.E) the leader of the Jamaat e Islami, became the most decisive Islamist ally of Wahhabi scholars. The ideology of Maududi shared many core aspects of Wahhabi beliefs; and the militant Islamist advocacy of JI and the pious lifestyle of its rank and file resulted in their association with Wahhabism by the Pakistani public. With the support of the Saudi scholars and through his relations with the Muslim Brotherhood and other Islamic revivalist groups in the Arab world, Maududi emerged as one of the most reputed Pakistani Islamic scholars. By his death in 1979, Maududi had been the first recipient of the King Faisal Award and revered as a Mujaddid (reviver) of Islam in the twentieth century.

Through the support of various Islamist groups, Saudis were able to strengthen their power and bolster conservative religious support across the Muslim world. With the consolidation of their rule, Saudi authorities demolished numerous shrines and structures associated with Islamic history. During this era, Saudi government offered asylum to the Muslim Brotherhood ideologues fleeing from the persecution of Jamal 'Abd al-Nasar. They were able to successfully popularise their revolutionary ideas in Saudi Arabia. The "infiltration of the transnationalist revival movement" in the form of thousands of pious, Islamist Arab Muslim Brotherhood refugees from Egypt following Nasser's clampdown on the Brotherhood (and also from similar nationalist clampdowns in Iraq and Syria) helped staff the new school system and educational curriculum of the (mostly illiterate) Kingdom. The Brotherhood's revolutionary Islamist ideology differed from the more conservative Wahhabism which preached loyal obedience to the king. The Brotherhood dealt in what one author (Robert Lacey) called "change-promoting concepts" like social justice and anticolonialism, and gave "a radical, but still apparently safe, religious twist" to the Wahhabi values Saudi students "had absorbed in childhood". With the Brotherhood's "hands-on, radical Islam", jihad became a "practical possibility today", not just part of history.

The Brotherhood were ordered by the Saudi clergy and government not to attempt to proselytize or otherwise get involved in religious doctrinal matters within the Kingdom, but nonetheless "took control of Saudi Arabia's intellectual life" by publishing books and participating in discussion circles and salons held by princes. In time they took leading roles in key governmental ministries, and had influence on education curriculum. An Islamic university in Medina created in 1961 to train – mostly non-Saudi – proselytizers to Wahhabism became "a haven" for Muslim Brother refugees from Egypt. The Brothers' ideas eventually spread throughout the kingdom and had great effect on Wahhabism – although observers differ as to whether this was by "undermining" it or "blending" with it.

== Growth: 1950s–1990 ==
In the 1950s and 1960s within Saudi Arabia, the Wahhabi ulama maintained their hold on shari'i courts, and presided over the creation of Islamic universities and a public school system which gave students "a heavy dose of religious instruction". Outside of Saudi the Wahhabi ulama became "less combative" toward the rest of the Muslim world. In confronting the challenge of the West, Wahhabi doctrine "served well" for many Muslims as a "platform" and "gained converts beyond the peninsula".

A number of reasons have been given for this success: the growth in popularity and strength of both Arab nationalism (although Wahhabis opposed any form of nationalism as an ideology, Saudis were Arabs, and their enemy the Ottoman caliphate was ethnically Turkish), and Islamic reform (specifically reform by following the example of those first three generations of Muslims known as the Salaf); the destruction of the Ottoman Empire which sponsored their most effective critics; the destruction of another rival, the Khilafa in Hejaz, in 1925. Not least in importance was the money Saudi Arabia earned from exporting oil.

=== Petroleum export era ===
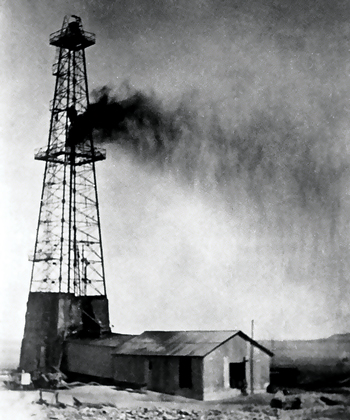
Dammam No. 7, the first commercial oil well in Saudi Arabia, which struck oil on the 4th of March 1938

The pumping and export of oil from Saudi Arabia started during World War II, and its earnings helped fund religious activities in the 1950s and 60s. But it was the 1973 oil crisis and quadrupling in the price of oil that both increased the kingdom's wealth astronomically and enhanced its prestige by demonstrating its international power as a leader of OPEC. With the help of funding from Saudi petroleum exports (and other factors), the movement underwent "explosive growth" beginning in the 1970s and now has worldwide influence. The US State Department has estimated that from about 1976 to 2016 state and private entities in Riyadh have directed at least $10bn (£6bn) to select charitable foundations toward the erosion of local Islamic practices by Wahhabism. By 1980, Saudi Arabia was earning every three days the income from oil it had taken a year to earn before the embargo. Tens of billions of US dollars of this money were spent on books, media, schools, scholarships for students (from primary to post-graduate), fellowships and subsidies to reward journalists, academics and Islamic scholars, the building of hundreds of Islamic centers and universities, and over one thousand schools and one thousand mosques. During this time, Wahhabism attained what anti-Islamist analyst Gilles Kepel called a "preeminent position of strength in the global expression of Islam".

=== Iranian Revolution and rise of Khomeinism ===
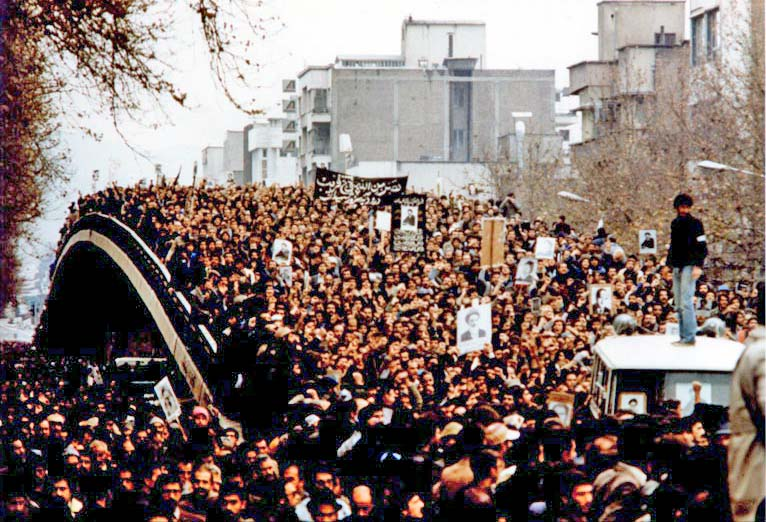
Mass demonstrations during the 1979 Iranian revolution

The February 1979 Khomeinist revolution challenged Saudi Wahhabism in a number of ways on a number of fronts. It was a revolution of Shia Muslims, not Sunnis, and Wahhabism held that Shias were misguided Muslims. Nonetheless, its massive popularity in Iran and its overthrow of a pro-American secular monarchy generated enormous enthusiasm among pious Sunnis, not just Shia Islamists around the world. The Supreme Leader of Iran, Ayatollah Ruhollah Khomeini, preached that monarchy was against Islam and America was Islam's enemy, and called for the overthrow of al-Saud family. (In 1987 public address Khomeini declared that "these vile and ungodly Wahhabis are like daggers which have always pierced the heart of the Muslims from the back", and announced that Mecca was in the hands of "a band of heretics".) All this spurred Saudi Arabia – a kingdom allied with America – to "redouble their efforts to counter Iran and spread Wahhabism around the world", and reversed any moves by Saudi leaders to distance itself from Wahhabism or "soften" its ideology.

=== Siege of Mecca in 1979 ===
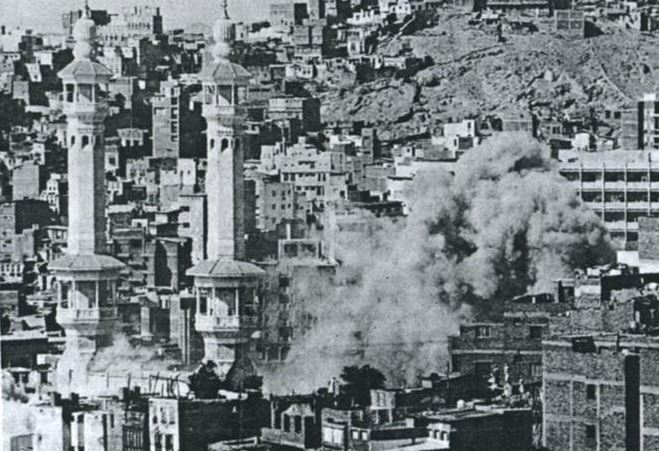
Smoke rising from the Grand Mosque during the assault on the Marwa-Safa gallery, 1979

In 1979, 400–500 Islamist insurgents, using smuggled weapons and supplies, took over the Grand mosque in Mecca, called for an overthrow of the monarchy, denounced the Wahhabi ulama as royal puppets, and announced the arrival of the Mahdi of "end time". The insurgents deviated from Wahhabi doctrine in significant details, but were also associated with leading Wahhabi ulama (Abd al-Aziz ibn Baz knew the insurgent's leader, Juhayman al-Otaybi). Their seizure of Islam's holiest site, the taking hostage of hundreds of hajj pilgrims, and the deaths of hundreds of militants, security forces and hostages caught in crossfire during the two-week-long retaking of the mosque, all shocked the Islamic world and did not enhance the prestige of Al Saud as "custodians" of the mosque.

The incident also damaged the prestige of the Wahhabi establishment. Saudi leadership sought and received Wahhabi fatawa to approve the military removal of the insurgents and after that to execute them, but Wahhabi clerics also fell under suspicion for involvement with the insurgents. In part as a consequence, Sahwa clerics influenced by Brethren's ideas were given freer rein. Their revolutionary ideology also competed with the nascent Khomeinist factions of the Iranian Revolution.

Although the insurgents were motivated by religious puritanism, the incident was not followed by a crackdown on other religious purists, but by giving greater power to the ulama and religious conservatives to more strictly enforce Islamic codes in myriad ways – from the banning of women's images in the media to adding even more hours of Islamic studies in school and giving more power and money to the religious police to enforce conservative rules of behaviour.

=== Jihad in Afghanistan ===
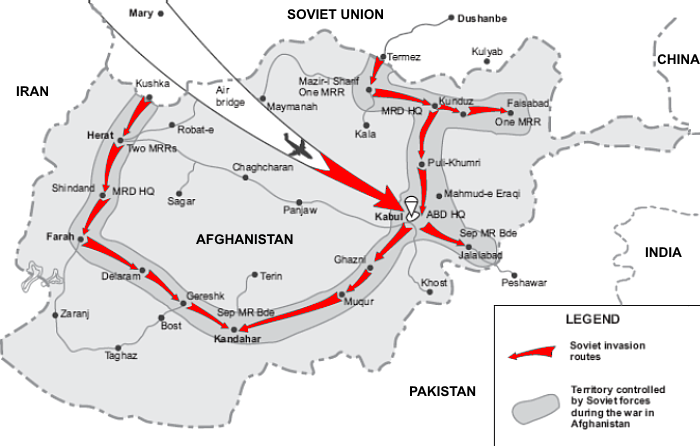
Map of the Soviet invasion of Afghanistan, December 1979

The "apex of cooperation" between Wahhabis and Muslim revivalist groups was the Afghan jihad. In December 1979, the Soviet Union invaded Afghanistan. Shortly thereafter, Abdullah Yusuf Azzam, a Muslim Brother cleric with ties to Saudi religious institutions, (Note: Azzam was a lecturer at King Abdulaziz University in Jeddah and active in the Muslim World League) issued a fatwa (Note: Defense of the Muslim Lands, the First Obligation after Faith) declaring defensive jihad in Afghanistan against the atheist Soviet Union, "fard ayn", a personal (or individual) obligation for all Muslims. The edict was supported by Saudi Arabia's Grand Mufti (highest religious scholar), Abd al-Aziz ibn Baz, among others. During this period, Saudi government funded militant Islamic groups, including Salafi as well as various Deobandi organisations.

Between 1982 and 1992 an estimated 35,000 individual Muslim volunteers went to Afghanistan to fight the Soviets and their Afghan regime. Thousands more attended frontier schools teeming with former and future fighters. Somewhere between 12,000 and 25,000 of these volunteers came from Saudi Arabia. Saudi Arabia and the other conservative Gulf monarchies also provided considerable financial support to the jihad – $600 million a year by 1982. By 1989, Soviet troops had withdrawn and within a few years the pro-Soviet regime in Kabul had collapsed.

This Saudi/Wahhabi religious triumph further stood out in the Muslim world because many Muslim-majority states (and the PLO) were allied with the Soviet Union and did not support the Afghan jihad. But many jihad volunteers (most famously Osama bin Laden) returning home to Saudi Arabia and elsewhere were often radicalized by Islamic militants who were "much more extreme than their Saudi sponsors".

== Decline of Wahhabism: 1990s–2017 ==
While Saudi responses to events like the Iranian revolution of 1979, Soviet invasion of Afghanistan (1979), November 1979 seizure of the Grand Mosque by militants, etc. involved boosting Wahhabi proselytisation and bolstering the power of the Ulemah, several crises that occurred during the last decade of the twentieth century worked to erode Wahhabi "credibility" in Saudi Arabia and the rest of the Muslim world. These included the deployment of US troops in Saudi Arabia during the 1991 Gulf War against Iraq; and the September 11, 2001 al-Qaeda attacks on New York and Washington. In each case the Wahhabi ulama were called on to support the dynasty's efforts to suppress religious dissent from Jihadists – and in each case it did; – exposing its dependence on the Saudi dynasty and its often unpopular policies.

=== 1990 Gulf War ===
In August 1990 Iraq invaded and annexed Kuwait. Concerned that Saddam Hussein might push south and seize its own oil fields, Saudis requested military support from the US and allowed tens of thousands of US troops to be based in the Kingdom to fight Iraq. But what "amounted to seeking infidels' assistance against a Muslim power" was difficult to justify in terms of Wahhabi doctrine.

Again Saudi authorities sought and received a fatwa from leading Wahhabi ulama supporting their action. The fatwa failed to persuade many conservative Muslims and ulama who strongly opposed US presence, including the Muslim Brotherhood-supported Sahwah ("Awakening") movement that began pushing for political change in the kingdom. Outside the kingdom, Islamist revival groups that had long received aid from Saudi and had ties with Wahhabis (Arab jihadists, Pakistani and Afghan Islamists) supported Iraq, not Saudi. During this time and later, many in the Wahhabi/Salafi movement (such as Osama bin Laden) not only no longer looked to the Saudi monarch as an emir of Islam, but supported his overthrow, focusing on jihad against the US and (what they believe are) other enemies of Islam. (This movement is also called as Salafi-Jihadist.)

=== After 9/11 ===
Attacking Saudi's putative ally (killing almost three thousand people and causing at least $10 billion in property and infrastructure damage) was assumed by many, at least outside the kingdom, to be "an expression of Wahhabism" since the al-Qaeda leader Osama bin Laden and most of the hijackers were Saudi nationals. A backlash in the formerly hospitable US against the kingdom focused on its official religion, which some came to consider "a doctrine of terrorism and hate". In the West, with the end of the Cold War and the obsoleted anti-communist alliance with conservative, religious Saudi Arabia; the September 11, 2001, attacks created enormous distrust towards the kingdom and especially its official religion.

Inside the kingdom, Crown Prince Abdullah addressed the country's religious, tribal, business and media leadership following the attacks in a series of televised gatherings calling for a strategy to correct what had gone wrong. According to Robert Lacey, the gatherings and later articles and replies by a top cleric, Abdullah Turki, and two top Al Saud princes, Prince Turki Al-Faisal and Prince Talal bin Abdul Aziz, served as an occasion to sort out who had the ultimate power in the kingdom: not the ulama, but rather the Al Saud dynasty. They declared that Muslim rulers were meant to exercise power, while religious scholars were meant to advise.

In 2003–2004, Saudi Arabia saw a wave of al-Qaeda-related suicide bombings, attacks on Non-Muslim foreigners (about 80% of those employed in the Saudi private sector are foreign workers and constitute about 30% of the country's population), and gun battles between Saudi security forces and militants. One reaction to the attacks was a trimming back of the Wahhabi establishment's domination of religion and society. "National Dialogues" were held that included "Shiites, Sufis, liberal reformers, and professional women". During a 2008 meeting with Saudi Arabian King Salman ibn 'Abd al-Aziz (then governor of Riyadh Province), Egyptian-American scientist Ahmed Zewail discussed about the usage of "Wahhabism" by segments of Western media. King Salman replied:

"there is no such thing as Wahhabism. They attack us using this term. We are Sunni Muslims who respect the four schools of thought. We follow Islam's Prophet (Muhammad, peace be upon him), and not anyone else.... Imam Muhammad bin Abdel-Wahab was a prominent jurist and a man of knowledge, but he did not introduce anything new. The first Saudi state did not establish a new school of thought... The Islamic thought, which rules in Saudi Arabia, stands against extremism.... We have grown tired of being described as Wahhabis. This is incorrect and unacceptable."

In 2009, as part of what some called an effort to "take on the ulama and reform the clerical establishment", King 'Abdullah issued a decree that only "officially approved" religious scholars would be allowed to issue fatwas in Saudi Arabia. The king also expanded the Council of Senior Scholars (containing officially approved religious scholars) to include scholars from Sunni schools of Islamic jurisprudence other than the Hanbali madh'hab – Shafi'i, Hanafi and Maliki schools. Relations with the Muslim Brotherhood have since deteriorated steadily. After 9/11, the then interior minister Prince Nayef blamed the Brotherhood for extremism in the kingdom, and he declared it guilty of "betrayal of pledges and ingratitude" and "the source of all problems in the Islamic world", after it was elected to power in Egypt. In March 2014 the Saudi government designated the Brotherhood as a "terrorist organization".

In April 2016, Saudi Arabia stripped its religious police, who enforce Islamic law on the society and are known as the Commission for the Promotion of Virtue and Prevention of Vice, from their power to follow, chase, stop, question, verify identification, or arrest any suspected persons when carrying out duties. They were told to report suspicious behaviour to regular police and anti-drug units, who would decide whether to take the matter further.

== Post-Wahhabi Era ==
=== Mohammad bin Salman (2017–present) ===
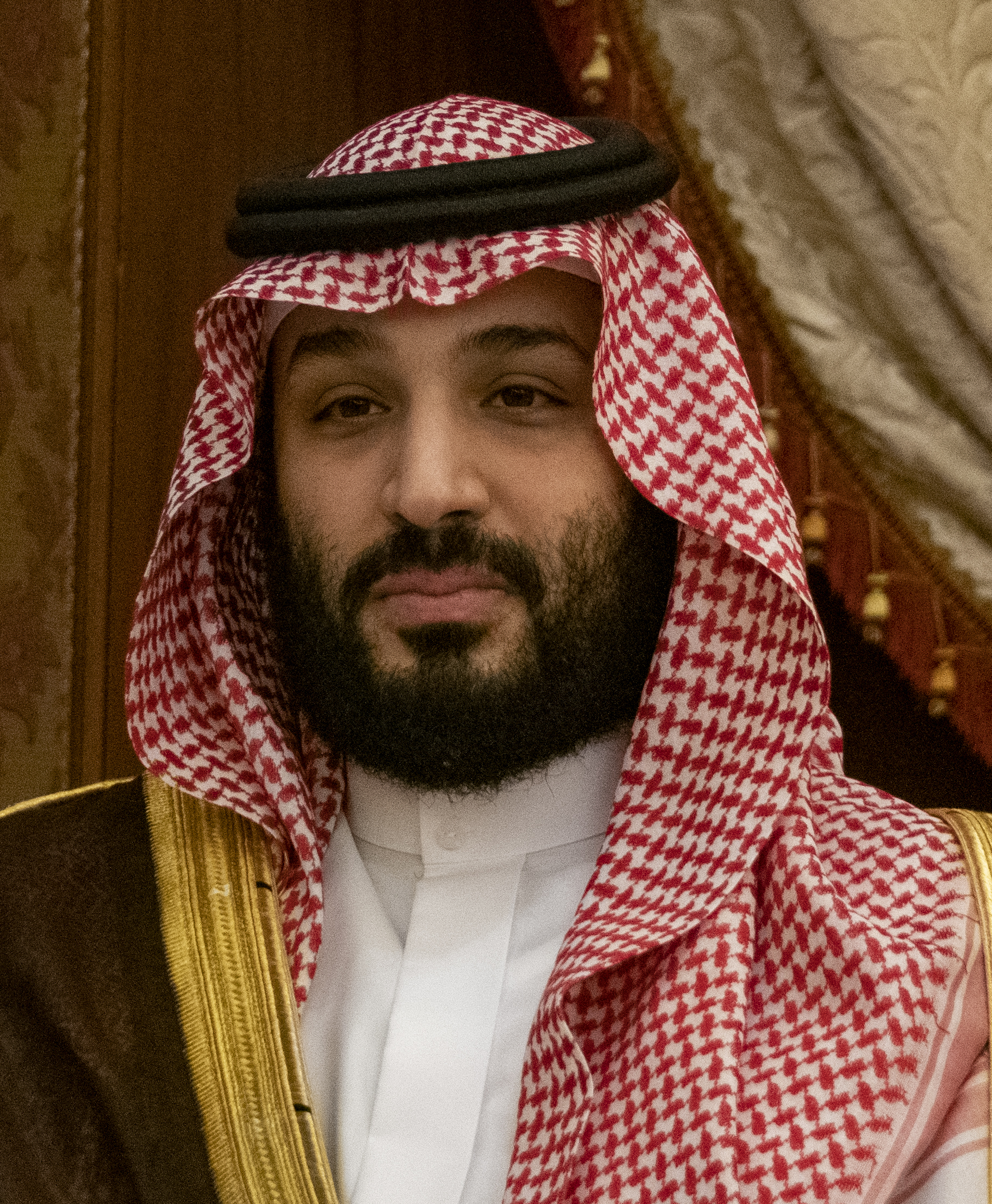
Saudi Crown Prince and Prime Minister Muhammad Bin Salman

Reformist actions on religious policy taken by Crown Prince Mohammed bin Salman (MBS) in 2017 have led many to question the future of Wahhabi conservatism in the Kingdom. In an October 2017 interview with The Guardian newspaper, MBS stated:

"What happened in the last 30 years is not Saudi Arabia. What happened in the region in the last 30 years is not the Middle East. After the Iranian revolution in 1979, people wanted to copy this model in different countries, one of them is Saudi Arabia. We didn't know how to deal with it. And the problem spread all over the world. Now is the time to get rid of it."

MBS has ruled in favor of allowing women to drive and enter sport stadiums, eventually reopening cinemas. According to Kamel Daoud, MBS is "above all ... putting pressure on the clergy and announcing the review and certification of the great canons of Muslim orthodoxy, including the hadiths, the collection of the Prophet Muhammad's sayings". By 2021, the waning power of the religious clerics brought forth by new social, religious, economic, political changes and a new educational policy asserting a "Saudi national identity" that emphasize non-Islamic components; have led to what has been described as the "post-Wahhabi era" of Saudi Arabia. (Note: Sources:) The 2016 international conference on Sunni Islam in Grozny (a Sufi conference funded by the government of the United Arab Emirates and Russia) where "200 Muslim scholars from Egypt, Russia, Syria, Sudan, Jordan, and Europe reject[ed] Saudi Arabia's doctrine", was described by the American journalist James M. Dorsey as a "frontal assault on Wahhabism" (as well as an assault on other conservative "interpretations of Islam, such as Salafism and Deobandism"). In an interview in May 2021 explaining Saudi Vision 2030, MbS defended Muhammad ibn ʿAbd al-Wahhab while mentioning his socio-cultural modernization policies, stating:

"If Sheikh Muhammad bin Abdulwahhab were with us today and he found us committed blindly to his texts and closing our minds to interpretation and jurisprudence while deifying and sanctifying him he would be the first to object to this. There are no fixed schools of thought and there is no infallible person. We should engage in continuous interpretation of Quranic texts and the same goes for the sunnah of the Prophet...."

Defending Saudi policies against extremist groups, MBS stated that extremist thinking is contrary to Islamic religion and culture, and that progress cannot be made in an extremist culture. MBS defined moderation as abiding by "the Qur'an, Sunnah, and basic governance system" and its implementation in a broad sense that is tolerant of various schools of thought. In addition, the Crown Prince defended the Basic Law of Saudi Arabia, stating:

".. Saudi constitution, which is the Quran, the Sunnah, and our basic governance system.. will continue to be so forever. ... So, ultimately our reference is the Quran and the Sunnah of the Prophet(peace be upon him) ... Our role is to make sure all the laws passed in Saudi Arabia reflect the following: One, that they do not violate the Quran and the Sunnah.. that they preserve the security and interests of citizens, and that they help in the development and prosperity of the country."

MbS' pronouncements rejecting Saudi Arabia as a "Wahhabi state", promotion of ijtihad, and encouraging tolerance to other schools (while re-affirming the non-existence of a "Wahhabi school") was received with praise across the Arab media and liberal columnists. It also echoed the calls of Egyptian President 'Abd Al-Fattah Al-Sisi for a "religious revolution" in 2018. Suggesting a possible coordination between the two nations on religious reforms, few days after the interview of MBS, Grand Imam of al-Azhar, Ahmed el-Tayeb called for a "religious renewal", stating:

"Constant renewal ensures that Islam remain a vital and dynamic religion that spreads justice and equality among people. The call to sanctify the jurisprudential heritage and treat it as equal to the Islamic shari'a [itself] leads to stagnation... due to elements that insist on adhering, in a literal manner, to old rulings which were considered innovative in their day."

== See also ==
- Ahl-i Hadith
- Islah
- Salafiyya
- International propagation of the Salafi movement and Wahhabism
- Islamic schools and branches
- Muslim World League
- Ottoman–Saudi War
- Muhammad Rashid Rida
- Schools of Islamic theology
- Ibn Taymiyyah
- Sufi–Salafi relations
- Aqidah

== Bibliography ==
- Algar, Hamid (2002). Wahhabism: A Critical Essay. Oneonta, NY: Islamic Publications International. ISBN 188999913X.
- Commins, David (2006). The Wahhabi Mission and Saudi Arabia (PDF). London: I.B. Tauris. ISBN 978-184511-0802.
- Commins, David (2009). The Wahhabi Mission and Saudi Arabia (Revised ed.). London: I.B. Tauris. ISBN 9780857731357.
- Commins, David (2015). "From Wahhabi to Salafi". In Haykel, Bernard; Hegghammer, Thomas; Lacroix, Stéphane (eds.). Saudi Arabia in Transition: Insights on Social, Political, Economic and Religious Change. New York: Cambridge University Press. pp. 151–66. doi:10.1017/CBO9781139047586.011. ISBN 978-1139047586. Archived from the original on 27 June 2016.
- DeLong-Bas, Natana J. (2004). Wahhabi Islam: From Revival and Reform to Global Jihad. New York: Oxford University Press. ISBN 0195169913.
- DeLong-Bas, Natana J. (2007). Wahhabi Islam: From Revival and Reform to Global Jihad. I.B. Tauris. ISBN 978-1845113223.
- Esposito, John, ed. (2003). The Oxford Dictionary of Islam. Oxford: Oxford University Press. doi:10.1093/acref/9780195125580.001.0001. ISBN 0195125584.
- Halverson, Jeffry R. (2010). Theology and Creed in Sunni Islam: The Muslim Brotherhood, Ash'arism, and Political Sunnism. Palgrave Macmillan. ISBN 978-0230106581.
- Kepel, Gilles (2002). Jihad: The Trail of Political Islam. Translated by Anthony F. Roberts (1st English ed.). Cambridge, MA: Harvard University Press. ISBN 0674-008774.
- Kepel, Gilles (2004). The War for Muslim Minds: Islam and the West. Harvard University Press. ISBN 978-0674-015753.
- Kepel, Gilles (2006). Jihad: The Trail of Political Islam. Translated by Anthony F. Roberts (New ed.). I.B. Tauris. ISBN 978-1845112578.
- Lacey, Robert (1981). The Kingdom: Arabia and the House of Sa'ud. New York and London: Harcourt Brace Javonoich.
- Lacey, Robert (2009). Inside the Kingdom: Kings, Clerics, Modernists, Terrorists, and the Struggle for Saudi Arabia. Viking. ISBN 978-0670-021185.
