= Jalajil =

City in Saudi Arabia

Coordinates: 25°40′N 45°27′E

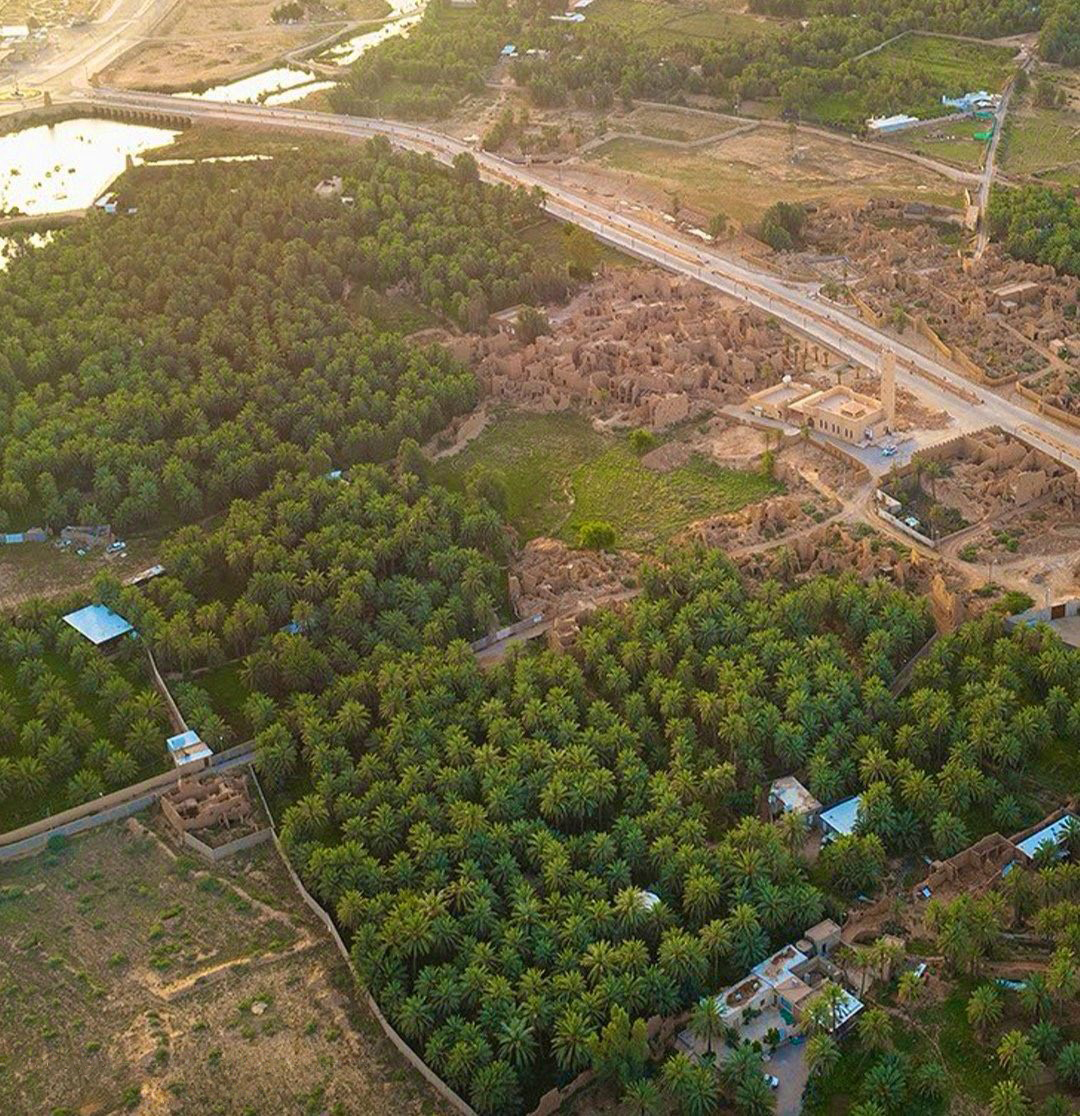
- Aerial view of the city
- Interactive map of Jalajil

Jalajil or Jolajil (Arabic: جلاجل) is a city in the Sudair area, Saudi Arabia. It is located north from Riyadh (about 180 km) and around 45.29° - 25.41°. The name Jalajil was taken from 'jaljalah' (Arabic: جلجلة), which refers to the trickling of water and its movement between the rocks of the valleys. Jalajil was mentioned by Yaqut Al-Hamawi in the Mu'jam ul-Buldān and said: "It is water that the Arabs bring down in the summer, as they usually do."

In the eleventh century it was one of the most powerful territories in Sudair region as mentioned by Abdullah bin Khamis. In the Al-Yamamah dictionary, he said that Jalajil was established in the year 700 AH, which was the country of the emirate in the time of Sheikh Muhammad bin Abd al-Wahhab, scholar of the third century AH.
