= Abdulaziz bin Muhammad Al Saud =

Ruler of the First Saudi State, 1765–1803

Emir and Imam of Diriyah
- Reign: 1765 – 1803
- Predecessor: Muhammad bin Saud (as Emir)
- Successor: Saud bin Abdulaziz bin Muhammad
- Born: 1720
- Died: 12 November 1803 (aged 82–83)
- Cause of death: Assassination
- Issue: List: Saud Abdul Rahman Abdullah Umar
Names
- Abdulaziz bin Muhammad bin Saud bin Muhammad bin Muqrin Al Maridi Al Adui
- House: Al Saud
- Father: Muhammad bin Saud

Abdulaziz bin Muhammad Al Saud (Arabic: عبد العزيز بن محمد آل سعود ʿAbd al ʿAzīz bin Muḥammad Āl Suʿūd; 1720–1803) was the second ruler of the Emirate of Diriyah. He was the eldest son of Muhammad bin Saud and the son-in-law of Muhammad bin Abdul Wahhab. Abdulaziz ruled the Emirate from 1765 until 1803. He was nicknamed by his people as the savior of his time (mahdi zamanihi in Arabic) due to his fearless activities.

== Early life ==
Abdulaziz was born in 1720 and was the eldest son of Muhammad bin Saud. He was educated by Muhammad bin Abdul Wahhab and became a Wahhabi scholar.

Long before the death of his father Abdulaziz was announced the next ruler of the state at the request of Muhammad bin Abdul Wahhab. From 1750 Abdulaziz was the chief military commander of the Emirate due to his father's old age. In 1763 he led a military campaign of the Emirate attacking the regions under the rule of the Bani Khalid Emirate. It was the first military attack of the Emirate outside the Nejd. These attacks were followed by those against the Sudair and Jalajil tribes who did not join the religious movement of Muhammad bin Abdul Wahhab. Next Abdulaziz raided the Ajman tribe who were the natives of the Najran region. In the latter attack the forces of Abdulaziz were defeated losing nearly one thousand men.

== Reign ==
The reign of Abdulaziz bin Muhammad began in 1765 when his father died. Abdulaziz's Bay'ah (Arabic: Pledge of allegiance) ceremony was supervised by Muhammad bin Abdul Wahhab. Although his father was titled as Emir, Abdulaziz was given the titles of both Emir and Imam. However, the latter title was not granted immediately after his succession to the throne, but it was given later. Imam as a title was a reflection of Abdulaziz's religious education by Muhammad bin Abdul Wahhab and his deeply religious personality. His younger brother, Abdullah, unsuccessfully challenged the rule of Abdulaziz.

Abdulaziz's father, Muhammad bin Saud, initiated attacks against the ruler of Riyadh, Dahham bin Dawwas, in 1747. However, following the battles for nearly 25 years only in 1773 Riyadh was captured by Abdulaziz and became part of the Emirate. Their military success and orthodox approach to religion won them great support in the area. Their standing was also boosted by Abdulaziz's practice of holding open meetings where tribal elders could meet with him, allowing access to their ruler. During his reign Muhammad bin Abdul Wahhab was his major advisor and dealt with all major activities, including treasury. However, following the capture of Riyadh Abdulaziz bin Muhammad himself began to control the budget of the state due to the significant increase in revenues. From 1789 Abdulaziz's supremacy was recognised by all Najdi people. As early as 1790 Abdulaziz's forces started their attacks in the region near the Euphrates in southern Iraq. The region was the settlement of the Shammar tribe, originally from Najd, and they were defeated two times in 1791. Muslat bin Mutlaq Al Jarba, son of the tribal leader Mutlaq bin Muhammad, killed in the battle which led to the migration of the tribe to southern Mesopotamia.

The expansion continued with the capture of Qatif in 1794 and Hasa in 1795 where Shiites were dominant. Abdulaziz's attacks against Hasa which had been under the rule of Banu Khalid began in 1792. From 1797 the relations between Abdulaziz and the Ottoman authorities both in Baghdad and in Mecca became tense.

In 1802 Hejaz, namely Taif and Khurma, was captured, and the people, particularly men, living there were slaughtered. In Taif Abdulaziz's forces took women and children as slaves. They also demolished the heterodox texts and innovative household equipment such as mirrors and window frames and robbed the wealth of the local people. Zubayr and other settlements in the region witnessed similar violence, too.

In 1802 Bahrain was invaded and captured by the ruler of Muscat. Abdulaziz bin Muhammad recaptured it in addition to Qatar and appointed a governor there, Abdullah bin Ufaysan. The rulers of Bahrain, Abdullah and Salman, together with their families were sent to Diriyah where they were all detained. Therefore, the Wahhabi influence also extended to Qatar and Bahrain. However, due to the Ottoman attacks in Hejaz Abdulaziz bin Muhammad did not manage to fully consolidate his power in Bahrain and had to reduce his forces there which allowed the Al Khalifa to reestablish their rule. Abdulaziz's governor, Abdullah bin Ufaysan, was detained by the Al Khalifa. In 1803 Mecca was taken by Abdulaziz's forces, and the religious figures in the city declared their alliance to Wahhabis. The attacks of the Saudi forces reached Syria, Iraq and Yemen where Abdulaziz managed to establish his authority.

== Sack of Karbala ==
In 1802 Abdulaziz bin Muhammad's forces led by his heir and son Saud attacked Karbala and Najaf in Iraq. Unlike other attacks the goal of Saudi forces was not to rule or control the region. They massacred thousands of the Shia population, stole enough precious loot to load 4,000 camels, and destroyed the dome over the shrine of Imam Hussain. They also stole the gold, jewels, and rare minerals in the shrine. This incident also had another and much more significant effect: it added a sectarian nuance to the Sunni-Shia divide in the Muslim world.

The observations of Lieutenant Francis Warden, a British military official, about the attack are as follows:

They pillaged the whole of it [Karbala], and plundered the Tomb of Hussein...slaying in the course of the day, with circumstances of peculiar cruelty, above five thousand of the inhabitants...

== Personal life and assassination ==
Abdulaziz married to the daughter of Muhammad bin Abdul Wahhab and the daughter of Uthman bin Mu'ammar, the ruler of Uyayna. He had four sons: Saud, Abdul Rahman, Abdullah and Umar. Of them Saud was born through Abdulaziz's marriage to the daughter of Uthman bin Mu'ammar.

Abdulaziz was much more adhered to the Wahhabi cause and more aggressive than his father. However, like his father he dressed in a plain way, and his armaments were not decorated unlike those of the Mamluk and Ottoman rulers.

Shortly after his capture of Mecca Abdulaziz returned to Diriyah where he was assassinated by a Kurdish man who was a darwish when Abdulaziz was leading Asr Salat in the mosque of Turaif in November 1803. The motive of the assassin was to take revenge against him due to the killing of his sons in the Karbala attack. The British newspaper London Times dated 12 March 1804 reported the following about the assassination:

Abdulaziz ibn Muhammad was assassinated by Ibadgi Osman, a Mussulman of the sect of Ali. He had profaned the tomb of Ali, and thus excited the fury of the disciples of that prophet. Ibadgi Osman resolved to avenge the ashes of Ali. He crossed the desert of Arabia on a dromedary, entered the tent of Abdulaziz while he was at prayers, and plunged a cangiar into his breast crying, "Let this avenge the tomb of Ali, for thy profanations." The brother of Abdulaziz, hearing the noise, ran into the tent, where he found his brother bathed in his blood, and the assassin, who squatted himself down, saying his prayers, and calmly awaiting death. He attacked him; but Ibadgi Osman, who was the strongest of the two, got up and killed his assailant with the same cangiar which was still stained with the blood of his brother. The soldiers then entered, and cut the assassin in pieces with their sabers.

Abdulaziz was succeeded by his eldest son, Saud.

== Writings ==
A student of his father-in-law, Muḥammad ibn 'Abdil Wahhab, 'Abdil 'Azīz bin Muḥammad followed his father-in-law and teacher in writing on matters such as tawhid and the avoidance of grave-worshiping and other such related matters, with his epistles having been praised by Al-Shawkani, a scholar.

Preceded by Muhammad bin Saud	Imam of First Saudi State; 1765–1803	Succeeded by Saud bin Abdulaziz
