= Wahhabism =

Fundamentalist movement within Sunni Islam

Wahhabism (Note: The term "Wahhabism" is primarily an exonym; it was not used by Ibn 'Abd al-Wahhab himself or his followers, who typically refer to themselves as Salafi, Sunni, or Muwahhidun. Arabic: ٱلْوَهَّابِيَّة, romanized: al-Wahhābiyya. The rejection of the label is based on the self-understanding as "true Islam". Wahhabis were well aware of being distinct from the majority of Muslims since the formative stage as "the Najd Mission". The rejection of the term is thus misleading.) is a Salafi revivalist movement within Sunni Islam named after the 18th-century Hanbali scholar Muhammad ibn Abd al-Wahhab. (Note: Sources: Knowles, Elizabeth (2005). Oxford Dictionary of Phrase and Fable (2nd ed.). Oxford University Press. ISBN 9780198609810. "[Wahhabi] A member of a strictly orthodox Sunni Muslim sect founded by Muhammad ibn Abd al-Wahhab (1703–92)"; Kerr, Anne; Wright, Edmund (2015). A Dictionary of World History (3rd ed.). Oxford University Press. ISBN 9780199685691. "Wahhabism...The doctrine of an Islamic reform movement .... It is based on the Sunni teachings of Ibn Hanbal (780–855)"; Ahsan, Sayyid (1987). "IV: Foundations of the Saudi State – II: Reforms of Muhammad Ibn 'Abd al-Wahhab". Trends in Islam in Saudi Arabia. Department of Islamic Studies, Aligarh Muslim University. pp. 141–142.; Bokhari, Kamran; Senzai, Farid, eds. (2013). "Conditionalist Islamists: The Case of the Salafis". Political Islam in the Age of Democratization. New York: Palgrave Macmillan. pp. 81–100. doi:10.1057/9781137313492_5. ISBN 9781137313492.) It was initially established in the central Arabian region of Najd, and later spread to other parts of the Arabian Peninsula. Despite being founded on the principles of Sunni Islam, the Hanbalite scholars Ibn Taymiyya and Ibn al-Qayyim in particular, Wahhabism may also refer to doctrinal differences distinct from other forms of Sunni Islam. Non-Wahhabi Sunnis also have compared Wahhabism to the belief of the Kharijites and loyalist monarchism. In 2013, a study commissioned by the European Parliament and authored by Claude Moniquet identified Wahhabism as the main source of global terrorism.

The Wahhabi movement staunchly denounced rituals related to the veneration of Muslim saints and pilgrimages to their tombs and shrines, which were widespread amongst the people of Najd. Ibn 'Abd al-Wahhab and his followers were highly inspired by the Hanbali scholar Ibn Taymiyya (1263–1328 CE/AH 661–728) who advocated a return to the purity of the first three generations (salaf) to rid Muslims of bid'a (innovation) and regarded his works as core scholarly references in theology. While being influenced by Hanbali school, the movement repudiated taqlid to legal authorities, including oft-cited scholars such as Ibn Taymiyya and Ibn Qayyim (d. 1350 CE/AH 751).

Wahhabism has been characterized by historians as "puritanical", (Note: Bonacina 2015, pp. 12–40; Coller 2022, pp. 151, 235; Bayley 2010, pp. 21–41) while its adherents describe it as an Islamic "reform movement" to restore "pure monotheistic worship". Socio-politically, the movement represented the first major Arab-led revolt against the Turkish, Persian and other foreign empires that had dominated the Islamic world since the Mongol invasions and the fall of the Abbasid Caliphate in the 13th century, and later served as a revolutionary impetus for 19th-century pan-Arab trends. In 1744, Ibn Abd al-Wahhab formed a pact with a local leader, Muhammad bin Saud, establishing a politico-religious alliance with the Saudi monarchy that lasted for more than 250 years. The Wahhabi movement gradually rose to prominence as an influential anti-colonial reform trend in the Islamic world that advocated the re-generation of the social and political prowess of Muslims. Its revolutionary themes inspired several Islamic revivalists, scholars, pan-Islamist ideologues and anti-colonial activists as far as West Africa.

For more than two centuries, Ibn Abd al-Wahhab's teachings were championed as the official creed in the three Saudi States. As of 2017, changes to Saudi religious policy by Crown Prince Mohammed bin Salman have led to widespread crackdowns on Islamists in Saudi Arabia and the rest of the Arab world. By 2021, the waning power of the religious clerics brought about by the social, economic, political changes, and the Saudi government's promotion of a nationalist narrative that emphasizes non-Islamic components, led to what has been described as the "post-Wahhabi era" of Saudi Arabia. Saudi Arabia's annual commemoration of its founding day on 22 February since 2022, which marked the ascension of Muhammad ibn Saud in 1727 and de-emphasized his pact with Ibn Abd al-Wahhab in 1744, has led to the official "uncoupling" of the religious clergy by the Saudi state.

== Name and definition ==
=== Etymology ===
The designation Wahhabi for this movement was likely first used by Sulayman ibn Abd al-Wahhab, an ardent critic of his brother's views, who used the term in his purported treatise Fasl al-Khitab fi al-Radd ala Muhammad ibn Abd al-Wahhab. The movement's political opponents widely used the term to denounce it. The word is primarily an exonym and was not used by Muhammad ibn Abd al-Wahhab or by his partisans, who called themselves Muwahhidun ("the Monotheists") derived from Tawhid, the central Islamic tenet denoting the oneness of God. Later, many followers adopted the term Salafi instead, ascribing themselves to the first three generations known as the salaf.

Modern-day followers of the movement continue to reject the term Wahhabi for themselves. Another prominent term used for the movement is Najdi that is derived from Najd, the central Arabian region where Ibn Abd al-Wahhab started his movement.

The term "Wahhabi" is distinct from Wahbi, which is the dominant creed within Ibadism.

=== Definition ===
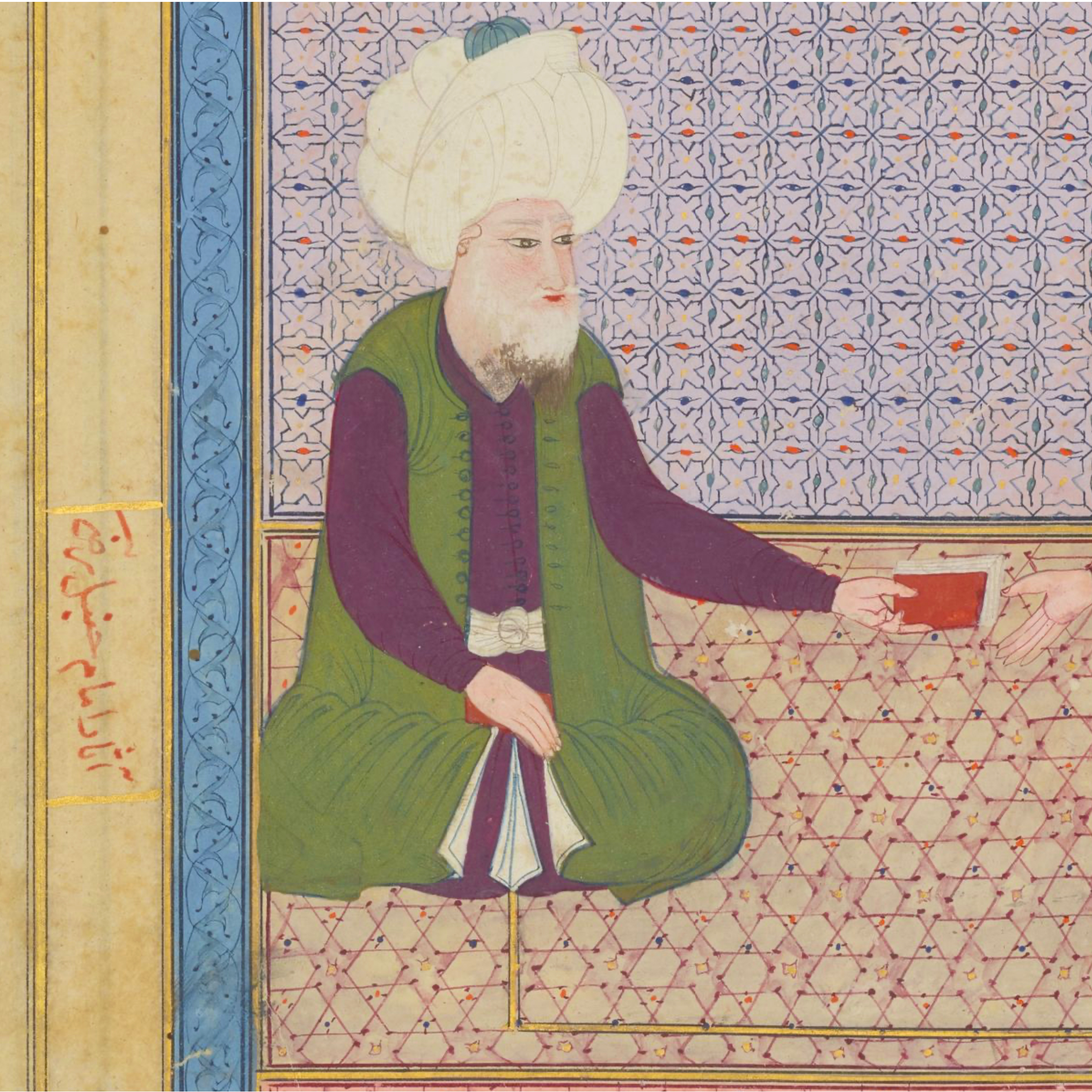
Islamic miniature depicting Ahmad ibn Hanbal

Alongside its basic definition as an 18th century reformist/revivalist movement, (Note: "Wahhabism refers to a conservative interpretation of Islam founded as a revival and reform movement in eighteenth-century Arabia.") the Wahhabi movement has also been characterized as a "movement for sociomoral reconstruction of society", "a conservative reform movement", and a sect with a "steadfastly fundamentalist interpretation of Islam in the tradition of Ibn Hanbal".

Supporters of the Wahhabi movement characterize it as being "pure Islam", (Note: "While Wahhabism claims to represent Islam in its purest form, other Muslims consider it a misguided creed that fosters intolerance, promotes simplistic theology, and restricts Islam's capacity for adaption to diverse and shifting circumstances.) indistinct from Salafism, and in fact "the true Salafist movement" seeking "a return to the pristine message of the Prophet" and attempted to free Islam from "superimposed doctrines" and superstitions". Opponents of the movement and what it stands for label it as "a misguided creed that fosters intolerance, promotes simplistic theology, and restricts Islam's capacity for adaption to diverse and shifting circumstances". The term "Wahhabism" has also become as a blanket term used inaccurately to refer to "any Islamic movement that has an apparent tendency toward misogyny, militantism, extremism, or strict and literal interpretation of the Qur'an and hadith".

Abdallah al Obeid, the former dean of the Islamic University of Medina and member of the Saudi Consultative Council, has characterized the movement as "a political trend" within Islam that "has been adopted for power-sharing purposes", but not a distinct religious movement, because "it has no special practices, nor special rites, and no special interpretation of religion that differ from the main body of Sunni Islam".

=== Naming controversy ===
Ibn Abd al-Wahhab himself or his followers typically refer to themselves as Salafi, Sunni or Muwahhidun. The term Wahhabi was probably first used by Sulayman ibn Abd al-Wahhab, a staunch opponent of his brother's views until 1776 CE/AH 1190, who declared the Wahhabi movement as the personal interpretation of its leader. Ibn Abd al-Wahhab and his movement's early followers referred to themselves as "al-muwahhidun" (monotheists; Arabic: الموحدون, lit. '"one who professes God's oneness"' derived from Tawhid (the oneness of God). The movement's present-day followers continue to reject the term and instead often refer to themselves as Salafi (also used by followers of other Islamic reform movements).

The term "Wahhabism" has frequently been used by external parties as a sectarian. The term used in this manner "most frequently used in countries where Salafis are a small minority" with the intent of "conjuring up images of Saudi Arabia" and foreign interference. Labelling by the term "Wahhabism" has historically been expansive beyond the doctrinal followers of Muhammad ibn ʿAbd al-Wahhab, who tend to reject the label. (Note: ... "stereotypes and images are assumed to be based on the conservative Wahhabi interpretation of Islam despite the fact that no systematic analysis of Muhammad Ibn Abd al-Wahhab's writings about women and gender has ever been undertaken ... the assertion that these attitudes are characteristic of Wahhabism risks inaccuracy because the term Wahhabism is rarely defined. Many of the regimes and movements labeled as Wahhabi in the contemporary era do not necessarily share the same theological and legal orientations ... Wahhabism has become such a blanket term for any Islamic movement that has an apparent tendency toward misogyny, militantism, extremism, or strict and literal interpretation of the Quran and hadith ... do not necessarily reflect the writings or teachings of Ibn Abd al-Wahhab. In fact, Ibn Abd al-Wahhab's life and writings reflect a concern for women and women's rights ..."DeLong-Bas 2004, pp. 123–24)

Since the 19th century, the epithet "Wahhabi" has been commonly invoked by various external observers to erroneously or pejoratively denote a wide range of reform movements across the Muslim world. The term was applied by colonial authorities in British India to Islamic religious movements perceived as a threat to imperial security, such as the Indian jihad movement promoted by Salafi leaders such as Syed Ahmad Barelvi and Siddiq Hasan Khan. The usage of the term by British officials led to a backlash from Indian Muslims and it was banned from being used in official discourse by 1889. Despite sharing little resemblance with the doctrines of Ibn ʿAbd al-Wahhab, outside observers of the Muslim world have frequently traced various religious purification campaigns across the Islamic World to Wahhabi influence. According to Qeyamuddin Ahmed:

In the eyes of the British Government, the word Wahabi was synonymous with 'traitor' and 'rebel' .... The epithet became a term of religio-political abuse.

In general, the so-called Wahhabis do not like – or at least did not like – the term. Ibn ʿAbd al-Wahhab was averse to the elevation of scholars and other individuals, including using a person's name to label an Islamic school (madhhab). Due to its perceived negative overtones, the members of the movement historically identified themselves as "Muwahhidun", Muslims, etc. and more recently as "Salafis". According to Robert Lacey "the Wahhabis have always disliked the name customarily given to them" and preferred to be called Muwahhidun (Unitarians). Another preferred term was simply "Muslims", since they considered their creed to be the "pure Islam". However, critics complain these terms imply that non-Wahhabi Muslims are either not monotheists or not Muslims. Additionally, the terms Muwahhidun and Unitarians are associated with other sects, both extant and extinct.

Other terms Wahhabis have been said to use and/or prefer include Ahl al-Hadith ("People of the Hadith"), Salafi dawah ("Salafi preaching"), or al-da'wa ila al-tawhid ("preaching of monotheism" for the school rather than the adherents), al-Tariqa al-Salafiyya ("the way of the pious ancestors"), "the reform or Salafi movement of the Sheikh" (the sheikh being Ibn ʿAbd al-Wahhab), etc. (Note: According to author Abdul Aziz Qassim.) Their self-designation "People of the Sunnah" was important for Wahhabism's authenticity, because during the Ottoman period only Sunnism was the legitimate doctrine.

Other writers such as Quinton Wiktorowicz, urge use of the term "Salafi", maintaining that "one would be hard pressed to find individuals who refer to themselves as Wahhabis or organizations that use Wahhabi in their title, or refer to their ideology in this manner (unless they are speaking to a Western audience that is unfamiliar with Islamic terminology; even then, its use is limited and often appears as Salafi/Wahhabi)". A New York Times journalist writes that Saudis "abhor" the term Wahhabism, "feeling it sets them apart and contradicts the notion that Islam is a monolithic faith".

Saudi King Salman bin Abdulaziz Al Saud for example has attacked the term as "a doctrine that doesn't exist here" [in Saudi Arabia] and challenged users of the term to locate any "deviance of the form of Islam practiced in Saudi Arabia from the teachings of the Quran and Prophetic Hadiths". Professor Ingrid Mattson stated that "Wahhbism is not a sect: It is a social movement that began 200 years ago to rid Islam of rigid cultural practices that had [been] acquired over the centuries." In an interview given to The Atlantic magazine in 2018, Saudi Arabian Crown Prince Mohammed bin Salman asserted that the Western usage of the term itself has been a misnomer. Stating that the terminology itself is indefinable, Mohammed bin Salman said: "When people speak of Wahhabism, they don't know exactly what they are talking about." However, there has been a multiyear "Conscious Uncoupling" in Saudi Arabia to separate the history of the state from Wahhabism. In 2019, prominent Saudi academic Khalid Al-Dakhil argued that most Saudis have been told the history of their state is that "Sheikh Muhammad ibn Abd al-Wahhab came to fight polytheism, Muhammad bin Saud joined him, and together they fought polytheism" and that what Saudis have been taught needs to change.

According to authors at Global Security and Library of Congress the term is now commonplace and used even by Wahhabi scholars in the Najd, a region often called the "heartland" of Wahhabism. Journalist Karen House calls Salafi "a more politically correct term" for Wahhabi. In any case, according to Lacey, none of the other terms have caught on, and so like the Christian Quakers, Wahhabis have "remained known by the name first assigned to them by their detractors". However, the confusion is further aggravated due to the common practice of various authoritarian governments broadly using the label "Wahhabi extremists" for all opposition, legitimate and illegitimate, to justify massive repressions on any dissident.

Another movement, whose adherents are also called "Wahhabi" but who were Ibaadi Kharijites, has caused some confusion in North and sub-Saharan Africa, where the movement's leader – Abd al-Wahhab ibn Abd al-Rahman – lived and preached in the eighth century CE. This movement is often mistakenly conflated with the Muwahhidun movement of Muhammad ibn Abd al-Wahhab.

=== Wahhabism and Salafism ===
There is considerable confusion between Wahhabism and Salafism, but many scholars and critics draw clear distinctions between the two terms. According to analyst Christopher M. Blanchard, Wahhabism refers to "a conservative Islamic creed centered in and emanating from Saudi Arabia", while Salafism is "a more general puritanical Islamic movement that has developed independently at various times and in various places in the Islamic world". However, many view Wahhabism as the Salafism native to Arabia. Ahmad Moussalli tends to agree Wahhabism is a subset of Salafism, saying "As a rule, all Wahhabis are salafists, but not all salafists are Wahhabis." Quintan Wiktorowicz asserts modern Salafists consider the 18th-century scholar Muhammed bin 'Abd al-Wahhab and many of his students to have been Salafis.

According to Joas Wagemakers, associate professor of Islamic and Arabic Studies at Utrecht University, Salafism consists of broad movements of Muslims across the world who aspire to live according to the precedents of the Salaf al-Salih; whereas "Wahhabism" – a term rejected by its adherents – refers to the specific brand of reformation (islah) campaign that was initiated by the 18th century scholar Muhammad ibn ʿAbd al-Wahhab and evolved through his subsequent disciples in the central Arabian region of Najd. Despite their relations with Wahhabi Muslims of Najd, other Salafis have often differed theologically with the Wahhabis and hence do not identify with them. These included significant contentions with Wahhabis over their unduly harsh enforcement of their beliefs, their lack of tolerance towards other Muslims and their deficient commitment to their stated opposition to taqlid and advocacy of ijtihad.

In doctrines of 'Aqida (creed), Wahhabis and Salafis resemble each other; particularly in their focus on Tawhid. However, the Muwahidun movement historically were concerned primarily about Tawhid al-Rububiyya (Oneness of Lordship) and Tawhid al-Uloohiyya (Oneness of Worship) while the Salafiyya movement placed an additional emphasis on Tawhid al-Asma wa Sifat (Oneness of Divine Names and Attributes); with a literal understanding of God's Names and Attributes.

== History ==
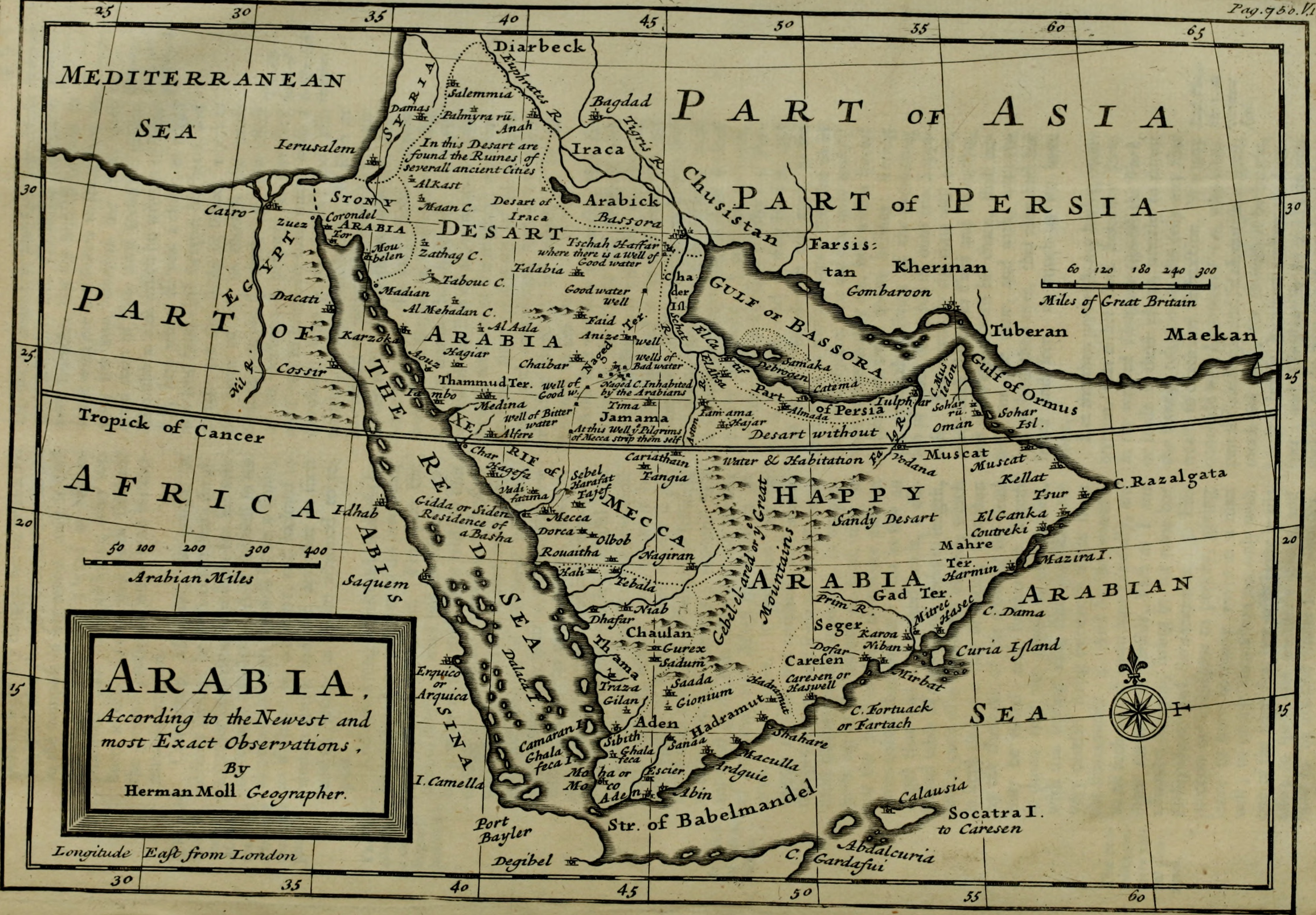
An 18th century map of the Arabian Peninsula circa. 1740s

The Wahhabi movement started as a revivalist and reform movement in the Arabian Peninsula during the early 18th century, whose adherents described themselves as "Muwahhidun" (Unitarians). A young Hanbali cleric named Muhammad ibn Abd al-Wahhab (1703–1792 CE/AH 1115–1206), the leader of the Muwahhidun and eponym of the Wahhabi movement, (Note: Sources: Knowles, Elizabeth (2005). Oxford Dictionary of Phrase and Fable (2nd ed.). Oxford University Press. ISBN 9780198609810. "Wahhabi... a strictly orthodox Sunni Muslim sect founded by Muhammad ibn Abd al-Wahhab (1703–92). It advocates a return to the early Islam of the Koran and Sunna"; Kerr, Anne; Wright, Edmund (2015). A Dictionary of World History (3rd ed.). Oxford University Press. ISBN 9780199685691. "Wahhabism...The doctrine of an Islamic reform movement founded by Muhammad ibn 'Abd al‐Wahhab (1703–92)... It is based on the Sunni teachings of Ibn Hanbal (780–855)"; Ahsan, Sayyid (1987). "IV: Foundations of the Saudi State – ll : Reforms of Muhammad Ibn 'Abd al-Wahhab". Trends in Islam in Saudi Arabia. Department of Islamic Studies, Aligarh Muslim University, Aligarh: Aligarh Muslim University. pp. 141–142.; Wagemakers, Joas (2021). "Part 3: Fundamentalisms and Extremists – The Citadel of Salafism". In Cusack, Carole M.; Upal, M. Afzal (eds.). Handbook of Islamic Sects and Movements. Handbooks on Contemporary Religion. Vol. 21. Leiden and Boston: Brill. p. 341. doi:10.1163/9789004435544_019. ISBN 9789004435544. ISSN 1874-6691.; Bokhari, Kamran; Senzai, Farid, eds. (2013). "Conditionalist Islamists: The Case of the Salafis". Political Islam in the Age of Democratization. New York: Palgrave Macmillan. pp. 81–100. doi:10.1057/9781137313492_5. ISBN 9781137313492.) called upon his disciples to denounce certain beliefs and practices associated with Sufi orders as idolatrous impurities and innovations in Islam (bid'ah). His movement emphasized adherence to the Quran and hadith, and advocated the use of ijtihad. Eventually, Ibn 'Abd al-Wahhab formed a pact with a local leader, Muhammad bin Saud, offering political obedience and promising that protection and propagation of the Wahhabi movement meant "power and glory" and rule of "lands and men".

18th and 19th century European historians, scholars, travellers and diplomats compared the Wahhabi movement with various Euro-American socio-political movements in the Age of Revolutions. Calvinist scholar John Ludwig Burckhardt, author of the well-received works "Travels in Arabia" (1829) and "Notes on the Bedouins and Wahábys" (1830), described the Muwahhidun as Arabian locals who resisted Turkish hegemony and its "Napoleonic" tactics. Historian Loius Alexander Corancez in his book "Histoire des Wahabis" described the movement as an Asiatic revolution that sought a powerful revival of Arab civilisation by establishing a new order in Arabia and cleansing all the irrational elements and superstitions which had been normalised through Sufi excesses from Turkish and foreign influences. Scottish historian Mark Napier attributed the successes of Ibn 'Abd al-Wahhab's revolution to assistance from "frequent interpositions of Heaven".

After the Unification of Saudi Arabia, Wahhabis were able to spread their political power and consolidate their rule over the Islamic holy cities of Mecca and Medina. After the discovery of petroleum near the Persian Gulf in 1939, Saudi Arabia had access to oil export revenues, revenue that grew to billions of dollars. This money – spent on books, media, schools, universities, mosques, scholarships, fellowships, lucrative jobs for journalists, academics and Islamic scholars – gave Wahhabi ideals a "preeminent position of strength" in Islam around the world.

== Relations with other Islamic reform movements ==
=== Islamic revivalism ===
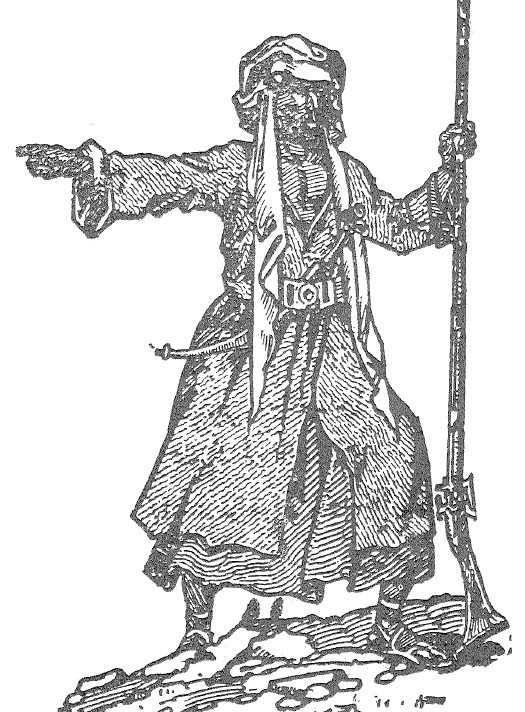
Portrait of a musketeer from the First Saudi State (Emirate of Diriyah).

The Wahhabi movement was part of the Islamic revivalist trends of the 18th and 19th centuries; such as the Mahdist movement in 19th century Sudan, Senussi movement in Libya, Fulani movement of Uthman Dan Fodio in Nigeria, Faraizi movement of Haji Shariatullah (1784–1840) in Bengal, the South Asian Mujahidin movement of Sayyid Ahmed Barelvi (1786–1831) and the Padri movement (1803–1837) in Indonesia, all of which are considered precursors to the Arab Salafiyya movement of late nineteenth century. These movements sought an Islamic Reform, renewal and socio-moral re-generation of the society through a direct return to the fundamental Islamic sources (Qur'an and Hadith) and responded to the military, economic, social, moral, cultural stagnation of the Islamic World. The cause of decline was identified as the departure of Muslims from the Islamic values of the early Muslims during the era of the Salaf, brought about by the infiltration and assimilation of local and un-Islamic beliefs and practices. The prescribed cure for Muslim societies was therefore a return to "true Islam".

=== Kadizadeli ===
Kadizadeli (also Qādīzādali) was a seventeenth-century puritanical fundamentalist religious movement in the Ottoman Empire that followed Kadızade Mehmed (1582–1635), a revivalist Islamic preacher. Kadızade and his followers were determined rivals of Sufism and popular religion. They condemned many of the Ottoman practices that Kadızade felt were bidʻah "non-Islamic innovations", and passionately supported "reviving the beliefs and practices of the first Muslim generation in the first/seventh century" ("enjoining good and forbidding wrong").

Driven by zealous and fiery rhetoric, Kadızade Mehmed was able to inspire many followers to join in his cause and rid themselves of any and all corruption found inside the Ottoman Empire. Leaders of the movement held official positions as preachers in the major mosques of Baghdad, and "combined popular followings with support from within the Ottoman state apparatus". Between 1630 and 1680 there were many violent quarrels that occurred between the Kadızadelis and those that they disapproved of. As the movement progressed, activists became "increasingly violent" and Kadızadelis were known to enter "mosques, tekkes and Ottoman coffeehouses in order to mete out punishments to those contravening their version of orthodoxy."

=== Ahl-i-Hadith ===
The Wahhabi movement was part of the overall current of various Islamic revivalist trends in the 18th century. It would be influenced by and in turn, influence many other Islamic reform-revivalist movements across the globe. The Ahl-i Hadith movement of Indian subcontinent was a Sunni revivalist movement inspired by the thoughts of Shah Waliullah Dehlawi, al-Shawkani, and Syed Ahmad Barelvi. They condemned taqlid and advocated ijtihad based on scriptures. Founded in the mid-19th century in Bhopal, it places great emphasis on hadith studies and condemns imitation to the canonical law schools. They identify with the early school of Ahl al-Hadith. During the late 19th century, Wahhabi scholars would establish contacts with Ahl-i-Hadith and many Wahhabi students would study under the Ahl-i-Hadith ulama, and later become prominent scholars in the Saudi Wahhabi establishment.

The Wahhabi and Ahl-i-Hadith movements both oppose Sufi practices such as visiting shrines and seeking aid at the tombs of Islamic saints. Both the movements revived the teachings of the medieval Sunni theologian and jurist, Ibn Taymiyya, whom they both consider a Shaykh al-Islam. Suffering from the instabilities of 19th-century Arabia, many Wahhabi ulama would make their way to India and study under Ahl-i-Hadith patronage. After the establishment of Saudi Arabia and the subsequent oil boom, the Saudi Sheikhs would repay their debts by financing the Ahl-i-Hadith movement. The Grand Mufti of Saudi Arabia Ibn Baz strongly supported the movement, and prominent Ahl-i-Hadith scholars were appointed to teach in Saudi Universities.

=== Salafiyya movement ===
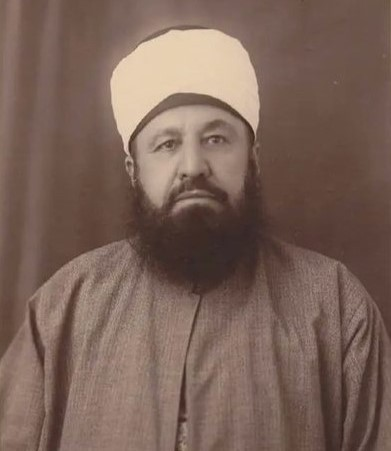
Salafi scholar Muhammad Rashid Rida (Arabic: محمد رشيد رضا; AH 1282–1354) made vital contributions in the rehabilitation of Wahhabism across the Arab World during the early 20th-century

During the early 19th century, Egyptian Muslim scholar al-Jabarti had defended the Wahhabi movement. From the 19th century, prominent Arab Salafiyya reformers would maintain correspondence with Wahhabis and defend them against Sufi attacks. These included Shihab al Din al Alusi, Abd al Hamid al Zahrawi, Abd al Qadir al Jabarti, Abd al Hakim al Afghani, Nu'man Khayr al-Din Al-Alusi, Mahmud Shukri Al Alusi and his disciple Muhammad Bahjat al-Athari, Jamal al-Din al-Qasimi, Tahir al-Jaza'iri, Muhibb al-Din al-Khatib, Muhammad Hamid al Fiqi and most notably, Muhammad Rasheed Rida who was considered as the "leader of Salafis". All these scholars would correspond with Arabian and Indian Ahl-i-Hadith scholars and champion the reformist thought. They shared a common interest in opposing various Sufi practices, denouncing blind following and reviving correct theology and Hadith sciences. They also opened Zahiriyya library, Salafiyya library, Al Manar Library, etc., propagating Salafi thought as well as promoting scholars like Ibn Taymiyya and Ibn Hazm. Rashid Rida would succeed in his efforts to rehabilitate Wahhabis in the Islamic World and would attain the friendship of many Najdi scholars. With the support of the Third Saudi State by the 1920s, a concept of "Salafiyya" emerged on a global scale claiming heritage to the thought of 18th-century Islamic reform movements and the pious predecessors (Salaf). Many of Rida's disciples would be assigned to various posts in Saudi Arabia and some of them would remain in Saudi Arabia. Others would spread the Salafi da'wa to their respective countries. Prominent amongst these disciples were the Syrian Muhammad Bahjat al-Bitar (1894–1976), Egyptian Muhammad Hamid al-Fiqi (1892–1959) and the Moroccan Taqi al-Din al-Hilali (1894–1987).

The Syrian-Albanian Islamic scholar Al-Albani (c. 1914–1999), an avid reader of Al-Manar and also student of Muhammad Bahjat al-Bitar (disciple of Rida and Al-Qasimi), was an adherent to the Salafiyya methodology. Encouraged by their call for hadith re-evaluation and revival, he would invest himself in Hadith studies, becoming a renowned Muhaddith. He followed in the footsteps of the ancient Ahl al-Hadith school and took the call of Ahl-i-Hadith. In the 1960s, he would teach in Saudi Arabia making a profound influence therein. By the 1970s, Albani's thoughts would gain popularity and the notion of "Salafi Manhaj" was consolidated.

=== Contemporary relations ===
Original Salafiyya and its intellectual heritage were not hostile to competing Islamic legal traditions. However, critics argue that as Salafis aligned with Saudi promoted neo-Wahhabism, religious concessions for Saudi political patronage distorted the early thrust of the renaissance movement. The early Salafiyya leaders like Muhammad ibn 'Ali al-Shawkani (d. 1835 CE/AH 1250), Ibn al-Amir Al-San'ani (d. 1810 CE/AH 1225), Muhammad Rashid Rida (d. 1935 CE/AH 1354), etc. advocated Ijtihad (independent legal research) of Scriptures to solve the new contemporary demands and problems faced by Muslims living in a modern age through a pragmatic, juristic path faithful to the rich Islamic tradition. However, as other Salafi movements got increasingly sidelined by the Saudi-backed neo-Wahhabi Purists; the legal writings that were made easily accessible to the general public became often rigidly literalist and intolerant of the wider Sunni legal tradition, limited to a selective understanding of the Hanbalite works of Ibn Taymiyya and Ibn Qayyim.

The Syrian-Albanian Salafi Muhaddith Muhammad Nasir al-Din al-Albani (d. 1999) publicly challenged the foundational methodologies of the neo-Wahhabite establishment. According to Albani, although Wahhabis doctrinally professed exclusive adherence to the Qur'an, the Hadith, and the Ijma of Salaf al-salih; in practice they almost solely relied on Hanbali jurisprudence for their fatwas—acting therefore as undeclared partisans of a particular madhab. As the most prominent scholar who championed anti-madhab doctrines in the 20th century, Albani held that adherence to a madhab was a bid'ah (religious innovation). Albani went as far as to castigate Ibn Abd al-Wahhab as a "Salafi in creed, but not in Fiqh". He strongly attacked Ibn Abd al-Wahhab on several points; claiming that the latter was not a mujtahid in fiqh and accused him of imitating the Hanbali school. Albani's outspoken criticism embarrassed the Saudi clergy, who finally expelled him from the Kingdom in 1963 when he issued a fatwa permitting women to uncover their face, which ran counter to Hanbali jurisprudence and Saudi standards.

In addition, Albani would also criticise Muhammad ibn Abd al-Wahhab for his weakness in hadith sciences. He distinguished between Salafism and Wahhabism, criticizing the latter while supporting the former. He had a complex relationship to each movement. Although he praised Ibn Abd al-Wahhab in general terms for his reformist efforts and contributions to the Muslim Ummah, Albani nonetheless censured his later followers for their harshness in Takfir.

In spite of this, Albani's efforts at hadith revivalism and his claims of being more faithful to the spirit of Wahhabism than Ibn 'Abd al-Wahhab himself; made the former's ideas highly popular amongst Salafi religious students across the World, including Saudi Arabia.

== Theology ==
In theology, Wahhabism is closely aligned with the Athari (traditionalist) school which represents the prevalent theological position of the Hanbali legal school. Athari theology is characterized by reliance on the zahir (apparent or literal) meaning of the Qur'an and hadith, and opposition to rational argumentation in matters of 'Aqidah (creed) favored by Ash'arite and Maturidite theologies. However, Wahhabis diverged in some points of theology from other Athari movements. Muhammad Ibn ʿAbd al-Wahhab did not view the issue of God's Attributes and Names as a part of Tawhīd (monotheism), rather he viewed it in the broader context of aqāʾid (theology). While his treatises strongly emphasised Tawhid al-ulūhiyya (monotheism in Worship), Ibn 'Abd al-Wahhab did not give prominence to the theology of God's Names and Attributes that was central to Ibn Taymiyya and the Salafi movement. Following this approach, the early Wahhabi scholars had not elucidated the details of Athari theology such as Divine Attributes and other creedal doctrines. Influenced by the scholars of the Salafiyya movement, the later Wahhabis would revive Athari theological polemics beginning from the mid-twentieth century; which lead to charges of anthropomorphism against them by opponents such as Al-Kawthari. By contrast, the creedal treatises of early Wahhabis were mostly restricted to upholding Tawhid and condemning various practices of saint veneration which they considered as shirk (polytheism). They also staunchly opposed Taqlid and advocated Ijtihad.

Hammad Ibn 'Atiq (d. 1883 CE/AH 1301) was one of the first Wahhabi scholars who seriously concerned himself with the question of God's Names and Attributes; a topic largely neglected by the previous Wahhabi scholars whose primary focus was limited to condemning idolatry and necrolatry. Ibn 'Atiq established correspondence with Athari scholars like Ṣiddīq Ḥasan Khān, an influential scholar of the Ahl al-Hadith movement in the Islamic principality of Bhopal. In his letters, Ibn 'Atiq praised Nayl al-Maram, Khan's Salafi commentary on Qur'an, which was published via prints in Cairo. He solicited Khan to accept his son as his disciple and requested Khan to produce and send more commentaries on the various treatises of Ibn Taymiyya and Ibn Qayyim. Khan accepted his request and embarked on a detailed study of the treatises of both the scholars. Hammad's son Sa'd ibn Atiq would study under Khan and various traditionalist theologians in India. Thus, various Wahhabi scholars began making efforts to appropriate Ibn Abd al-Wahhab's legacy into mainstream Sunni Islam by appropriating them to the broader traditionalist scholarship active across the Indian subcontinent, Iraq, Syria, Egypt, Yemen, etc.

The Hanafite scholar Ibn Abi al-Izz's sharh (explanation) on Al-Tahawi's creedal treatise Al-Aqida al-Tahawiyya proved popular with the later adherents of the Muwahidun movement; who regarded it as a true representation of the work, free from Maturidi influences and as a standard theological reference for the Athari creed. A number of Salafi and Wahhabi scholars have produced super-commentaries and annotations on the sharh, including Abd al-Aziz ibn Baz, Muhammad Nasiruddin al-Albani, Saleh Al-Fawzan, etc. and is taught as a standard text at the Islamic University of Madinah.

=== Tawhid ===
Like all Muslims, Wahhabis uphold the doctrine of tawḥīd. Unique to Wahhabism is the implementation of tawḥīd al-ibada (servitude), which prohibits commitment to intermediaries or spiritual practises not endorsed by Wahhabi hermeneutics. Intercession by prophets and saints, widespread across other Islamic denominations, is considered a violation of tawḥīd by Wahhabis. The disagreement between Wahhabis and other Muslims is not on tawḥīd, but rather what constitutes tawḥīd.

David Commins describes the "pivotal idea" in Ibn Abd al-Wahhab's teaching as being that "Muslims who disagreed with his definition of monotheism were not ... misguided Muslims, but outside the pale of Islam altogether." This put Ibn Abd al-Wahhab's teaching at odds with that of those Muslims who argued that the "shahada" (i.e., the testimony of faith; "There is no god but God, Muhammad is his messenger") alone made one a Muslim, and that shortcomings in that person's behavior and performance of other obligatory rituals rendered them "a sinner", but "not an unbeliever."

Muhammad ibn Abd al-Wahhab did not accept that view. He argued that the criterion for one's standing as either a Muslim or an unbeliever was correct worship as an expression of belief in one God ... any act or statement that indicates devotion to a being other than God is to associate another creature with God's power, and that is tantamount to idolatry (shirk). Muhammad ibn 'Abd al-Wahhab included in the category of such acts popular religious practices that made holy men into intercessors with God. That was the core of the controversy between him and his adversaries, including his own brother.

In his major work, Ibn 'Abd al-Wahhab's major work, Kitab al-Tawhid, he denounces practises of intercession common among his contemporaries such as the veneration of trees and rocks. Ibn 'Abd al-Wahhab condemned such practises due to the implicit affirmation that such entities could bring about luck or blessings without permission by God. Ibn 'Abd al-Wahhab affirms that Muhammad will intercede for the believers but only by God's permission, thus, ultimately it is God to whom people should seek blessings and forgiveness.

According to Ibn 'Abd al-Wahhab, someone who does not conform to their doctrines, even if their lives are otherwise exemplary; is deemed a heretic and an unbeliever. Once such people have received the call to Wahhabism, understood it and then rejected it, their blood and treasure are forfeit. Clarifying his stance on Takfir, Ibn 'Abd al-Wahhab states:

As for takfir, I only make takfir of whoever knows the religion of the Messenger and thereafter insults it, forbids people from it, and manifests enmity towards whoever practices it. This is who I make takfir of. And most of the ummah, and all praise is for God, is not like this... We do not make takfeer except on those matters which all of the ūlemá have reached a consensus on.

The disagreement between Wahhabis and their opponents over the definition of worship (Ibadah) and monotheism (Tawhid) has remained much the same since 1740, according to David Commins: "One of the peculiar features of the debate between Wahhabis and their adversaries is its apparently static nature... the main points in the debate [have] stay[ed] the same [since 1740]." According to another source, Wahhabi jurists were unique for their literal interpretation of the Qur'an and Sunnah which tended to re-inforce local practices of the region of Najd. Whether the teachings of Muhammad ibn 'Abd al-Wahhab included the need for social renewal and "plans for socio-religious reform of society" in the Arabian Peninsula, rather than simply a return to "ritual correctness and moral purity", is disputed.

=== Ijtihad and Taqlid ===
The Wahhabi scholars upheld the right of qualified scholars to perform Ijtihad on legal questions and condemned Taqleed of Mujtahids. This stance pitted them against the Ottoman Sufi ulema who shunned Ijtihad and obligated Taqleed. The Arab Salafiyya reformers of 19th and 20th centuries would defend the Wahhabis on the Ijtihad issue as well as join forces with Wahhabis to condemn various Sufi practices and orders (tariqats) which they considered to be reprehensible Bid'ah (innovations). Prominent amongst those Salafiyya ulema who backed Wahhabism included Khayr al-Din al-Alusi, Tahir al-Jaza'iri, Muhammad Rashid Rida, Jamal al-Din al-Qasimi, Mahmud Shukri Al-Alusi, etc.

Condemning the doctrine of blind-following (Taqlid) prevalent amongst the masses and obliging them to directly engage with the Scriptures; Sulaymān ibn 'Abd-Allāh al-Shaykh (1785–1818 CE/AH 1199–1233) wrote:

... what the believer must do, if the Book of Allah and the Sunnah of His Messenger (peace and blessings of Allah be upon him) have reached him and he understands them with regard to any matter, is to act in accordance with them, no matter who he may be disagreeing with. This is what our Lord and our Prophet (peace and blessings of Allah be upon him) have enjoined upon us, and all the scholars are unanimously agreed on that, apart from the ignorant blind followers and the hard-hearted. Such people are not scholars.

The Wahhabis furthermore rejected the idea of closure of Ijtihad as an innovated principle. Although they professed adherence to Hanbali school, they refrained from taking its precepts as final. Since the issue of Ijtihad and Taqlid was amongst their principal concerns, Wahhabis developed a new set of juristic procedures to solve legal questions. Accordingly, they first search the Qur'an and Hadith as the primary sources of legislation. In case the solution was not accessible from the Scriptures, the principle of 'Ijma (consensus) was employed. Ijma was restricted to Ahl al-Sunnah and consisted of consensus of Companions of the Prophet, Salaf as-Salih and the consensus of scholars.

Prominent Wahhabi Qadi of the Second Saudi State, 'Abd al-Rahman ibn Hasan Aal-Al Shaykh (1782–1868 CE/AH 1196–1285) strongly condemned the practice of taqlid as a form of shirk (polytheism) in his treatises, writing:

One who asks for a religious verdict concerning an issue, he should examine the sayings and opinions of the Imams and scholars and take only what complies with Allah's Rulings and the teachings of His Prophet (peace and blessings be upon him). Allah, the Almighty says, "O you who believe! Obey Allah and obey the Messenger ... and those of you [Muslims] who are in authority. [And] if you differ in anything amongst yourselves, refer it to Allah and His Messenger" ... (Surah An-Nisa': 59) Thus, it is forbidden to prefer the opinion of any of Allah's creatures over the Sunnah of the Messenger of Allah (peace and blessings be upon him) and this is because to do so is an act of shirk (polytheism); since it constitutes obedience to other than Allah (Glorified be He).

The Wahhabis also advocated a principle in Islamic legal theory often referred to as "the rule against Ijtihad reversal". This principle allows overturning a scholar's fatwa (legal judgement) when he bases it on personal Ijtihad (personal legal reasoning), rather than a clear textual source from Qur'an and Hadith. In effect, this allowed the Wahhabi qadis to remain autonomous. Opponents of Wahhabi movement harshly rebuked them for advocating Ijtihad and not recognising the finality of mad'habs (law schools).

== Practices ==
As a religious revivalist movement that works to bring Muslims back from what it considers as foreign accretions that have corrupted Islam, and believes that Islam is a complete way of life which has prescriptions for all aspects of life, Wahhabism is quite strict in what it considers Islamic behavior. The Muwahhidun movement has been described by The Economist as the "strictest form of Sunni Islam". On the other hand, religious critics assert that Wahhabism is not strict, castigating it as a distorted version of Islam that deviates from traditional Shari'a law, and argue that their practices are neither typical nor mired in the roots of Islam. Unlike other schools of Sunnism, Wahhabis admonishes to ground Islamic principles solely on the Qur'an and Hadith, rejecting much material derived within Islamic culture.

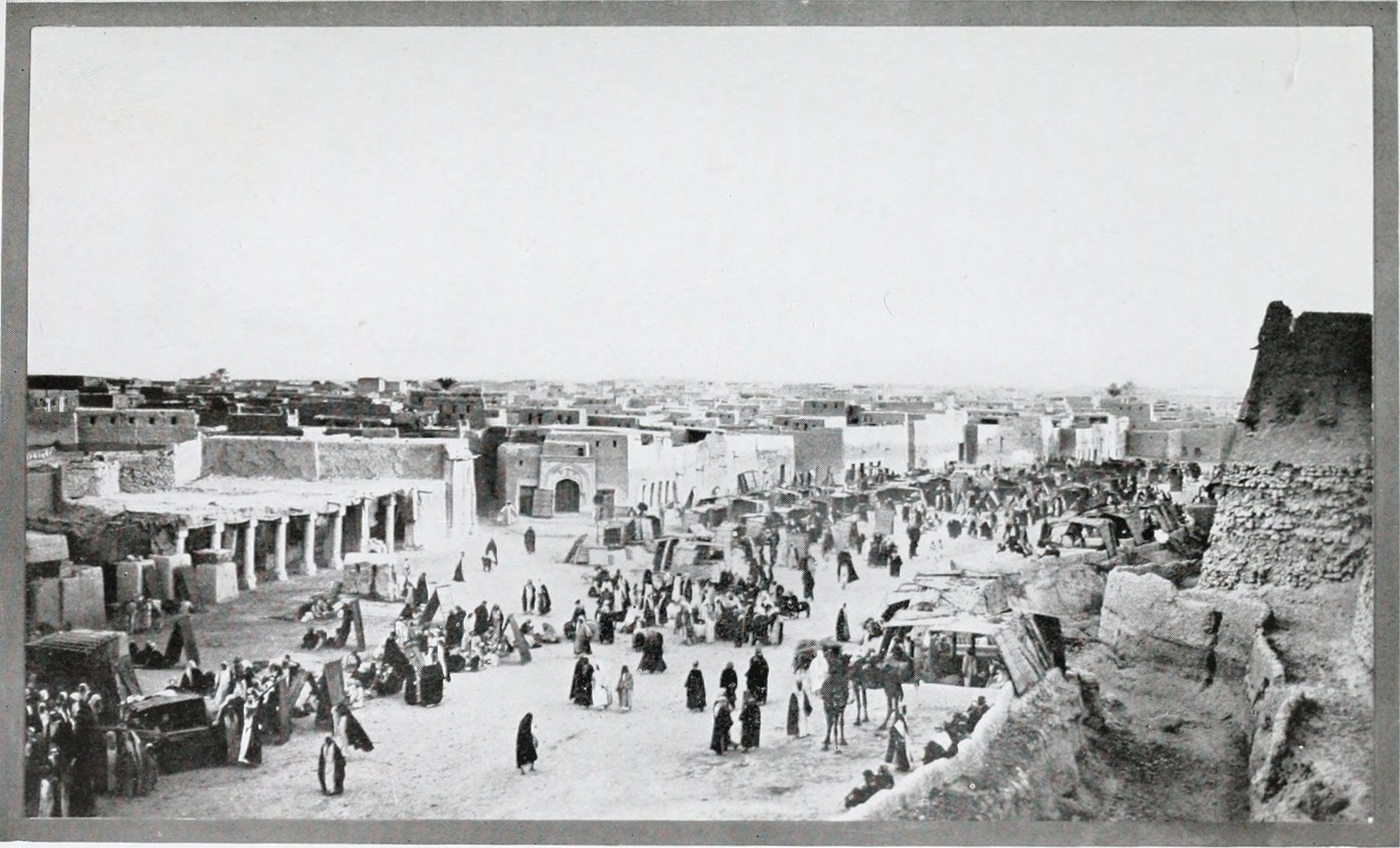
Photo of a marketplace in the town of Al-Hasa c. 1922

This does not mean, however, that all adherents agree on what is required or forbidden, or that rules have not varied by area or changed over time. In Saudi Arabia, the strict religious atmosphere of Wahhabi doctrines were visible as late as the 1990s; such as the conformity in dress, public deportment, public prayers. Its presence was visible by the wide freedom of action of the "religious police", clerics in mosques, teachers in schools, and Qadis (i.e. judges who are religious legal scholars) in Saudi courts.

=== Commanding right and forbidding wrong ===
Wahhabism is noted for its policy of "compelling its own followers and other Muslims strictly to observe the religious duties of Islam, such as the five prayers", and for "enforcement of public morals to a degree not found elsewhere". According to the American journalist Lawrence Wright, due to Wahhabi emphasis on the "purification of Islam"; the teaching becomes very repressive to the followers.

While other Muslims might urge salat prayer, modest dress, and abstention from alcohol, for Wahhabis, prayer "that is punctual, ritually correct, and communally performed not only is urged but publicly required of men." Not only is modest dress prescribed, but the type of clothing that should be worn, especially by women (a black abaya, covering all but the eyes and hands) is specified. Not only is wine forbidden, but so are "all intoxicating drinks and other stimulants, including tobacco". While being influenced by Hanbali doctrines, the movement repudiated Taqlid to legal authorities, including oft-cited scholars such as Ibn Taymiyya and Ibn Qayyim (d. 1350 CE/AH 751).

Following the preaching and practice of ibn 'Abd al-Wahhab that coercion should be used to enforce following of sharia (Islamic law), an official committee was empowered to "Command the Good and Forbid the Evil" (the so-called "religious police") in Saudi Arabia – the one country founded with the help of Wahhabi warriors and whose scholars and pious citizens dominated many aspects of the Kingdom's life. Committee "field officers" enforce strict closing of shops at prayer time, segregation of the sexes, prohibition of the sale and consumption of alcohol, driving of motor vehicles by women, and other social restrictions.

A large number of practices was reported to be forbidden by Saudi Wahhabi officials, preachers or religious police. Practices that have been forbidden as Bid'a (innovation) or shirk (polytheism) and sometimes "punished by flogging" during Wahhabi history include performing or listening to music; dancing; fortune telling; amulets; non-religious television programs; smoking; playing backgammon, chess, or cards; drawing human or animal figures; acting in a play or writing fiction; dissecting cadavers, even in criminal investigations and for the purposes of medical research; recorded music played over telephones on hold; or the sending of flowers to friends or relatives who are in the hospital. Common Muslim practices Wahhabis believe are contrary to Islam include listening to music in praise of Muhammad, praying to God while visiting tombs (including the tomb of Muhammad), celebrating mawlid (birthday of the Prophet), the use of ornamentation on or in mosques, all of which is considered orthodoxy in the rest of the Islamic world. Until 2018, driving of motor vehicles by women was allowed in every country except the Wahhabi-dominated Saudi Arabia. Certain forms of dream interpretation, practiced by the famously strict Taliban, are sometimes discouraged by Wahhabis.

Wahhabism also emphasizes "Thaqafah Islamiyyah" or Islamic culture and the importance of avoiding non-Islamic cultural practices and non-Muslim friendship no matter how innocent these may appear, on the grounds that the Sunnah forbids imitating non-Muslims. Foreign practices sometimes punished and sometimes simply condemned by Wahhabi preachers as un-Islamic, include celebrating foreign days (such as Valentine's Day or Mothers Day) giving of flowers, standing up in honor of someone, celebrating birthdays (including the Prophet's), keeping or petting dogs. Some Wahhabi activists have warned against taking non-Muslims as friends, smiling at or wishing them well on their holidays.

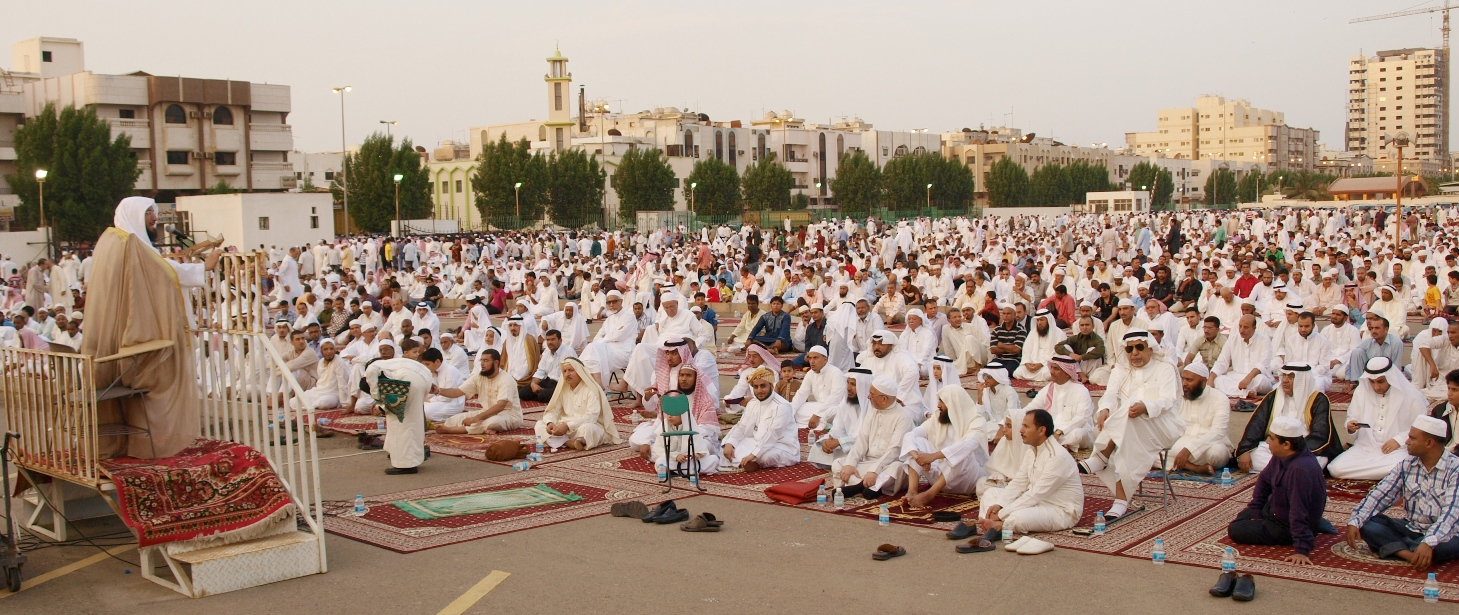
Open air mosque in Jeddah, Saudi Arabia

Wahhabis are not in unanimous agreement on what is forbidden as sin. Some Wahhabi preachers or activists go further than the official Saudi Arabian Council of Senior Scholars in forbidding (what they believe to be) sin. Juhayman al Utaybi declared football forbidden for a variety of reasons including it is a non-Muslim, foreign practice, because of the revealing uniforms and because of the foreign non-Muslim language used in matches. In response, the Saudi Grand Mufti rebuked such fatwas and called on the religious police to prosecute its author.

According to senior Saudi scholars, Islam forbids the traveling or working outside the home by a woman without their husband's permission – permission which may be revoked at any time – on the grounds that the different physiological structures and biological functions of the two sexes mean that each is assigned a distinctive role to play in the family. Sexual intercourse out of wedlock may be punished with flogging.

Despite this strictness, throughout these years senior Saudi scholars in the kingdom made exceptions in ruling on what is haram (forbidden). Foreign non-Muslim troops are forbidden in Arabia, except when the king needed them to confront Saddam Hussein in 1990; gender mixing of men and women is forbidden, and fraternization with non-Muslims is discouraged, but not at King Abdullah University of Science and Technology (KAUST). Until 2018, movie theaters and driving by women were forbidden, except at the ARAMCO compound in eastern Saudi, populated by workers for the company that provides almost all the government's revenue. The exceptions made at KAUST were also in effect at ARAMCO.

More general rules of permissiveness changed over time. Abdulaziz Ibn Saud imposed Wahhabi doctrines and practices "in a progressively gentler form" as his early 20th-century conquests expanded his state into urban areas, especially the Hejaz. After vigorous debate Wahhabi religious authorities in Saudi Arabia allowed the use of paper money (in 1951), the abolition of slavery (in 1962), education of females (1964), and use of television (1965). Music, the sound of which once might have led to summary execution, is now commonly heard on Saudi radios. Minarets for mosques and use of funeral markers, which were once forbidden, are now allowed. Prayer attendance, which was once enforced by flogging, is no longer.

=== Appearance ===
The uniformity of dress among men and women in Saudi Arabia (compared to other Muslim countries in the Middle East) has been called by Arthur G Sharp as a "striking example of Wahhabism's outward influence on Saudi society", and an example of the Wahhabi belief that "outward appearances and expressions are directly connected to one's inward state."

A "badge" of a particularly pious Wahhabi man is a robe too short to cover the ankle, an untrimmed beard, and no cord (Agal) to hold the head scarf in place. The warriors of the Wahhabi Ikhwan religious militia wore a white turban in place of an agal.

== Beliefs ==
Adherents to the Wahhabi movement identify as Sunni Muslims. The primary Wahhabi doctrine is affirmation of the uniqueness and unity of God (Tawhid), and opposition to shirk (violation of tawhid – "the one unforgivable sin", according to Ibn Abd Al-Wahhab). They call for adherence to the beliefs and practices of the Salaf al-Salih (exemplary early Muslims). They strongly oppose what they consider to be heterodox doctrines, particularly those held by the Sufi and Shiite traditions, such as beliefs and practices associated with the veneration of Prophets and saints. Ibn 'Abd al-Wahhab associated such practices with the culture of Taqlid (imitation to established customs) adored by pagan-cults of the Jahiliyya period. The movement emphasized reliance on the literal meaning of the Quran and hadith, rejecting rationalistic theology (kalam). Adherents of Wahhabism are favourable to derivation of new legal rulings (ijtihad) so long as it is true to the essence of the Quran, Sunnah and understanding of the salaf, and they do not regard this as bid'ah (innovation).

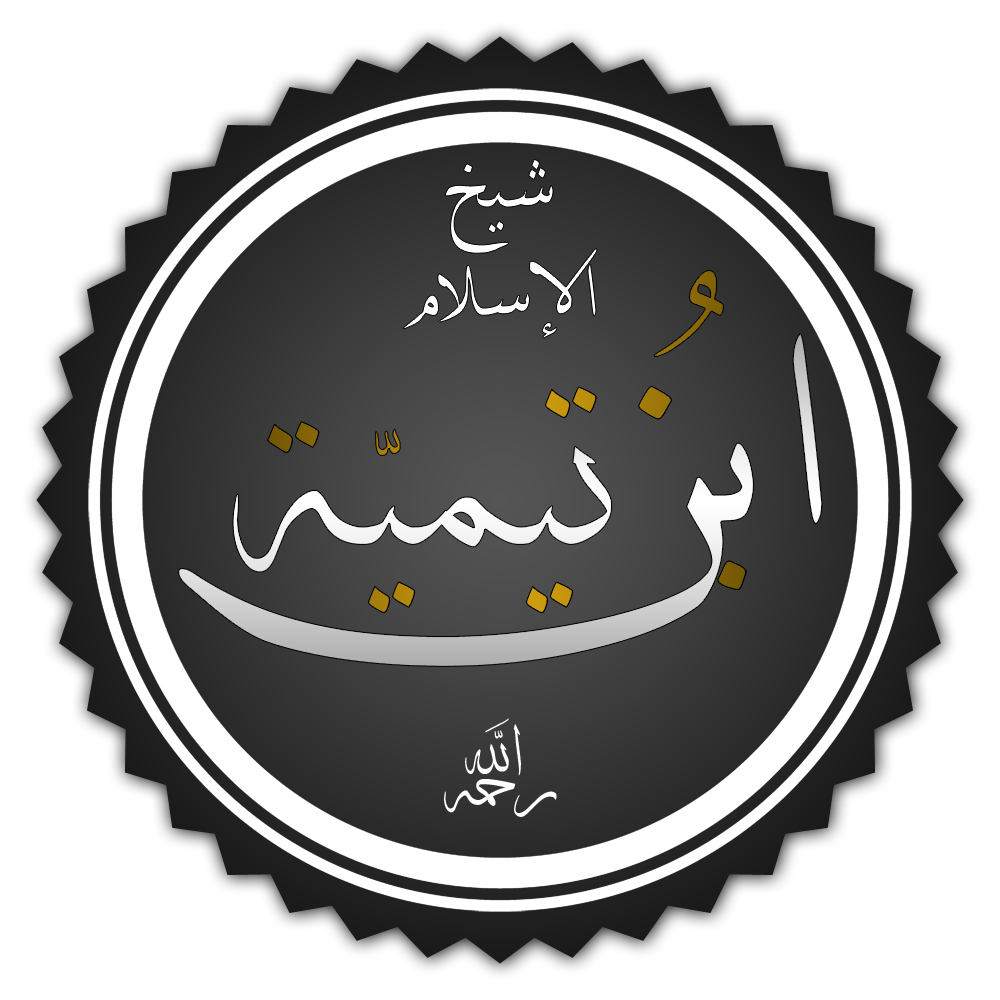
Muwahhidun (Wahhabi) movement is highly influenced by the doctrines of the classical Hanbali theologian Ibn Taymiyya (d. 1328 CE/AH 728)

The movement is heavily influenced by the works of thirteenth-century Hanbali theologian Ibn Taymiyya who rejected Kalam theology; and his disciple Ibn Qayyim who elaborated Ibn Taymiyya's ideals. Ibn Taymiyya's priority of ethics and worship over metaphysics, in particular, is readily accepted by Wahhäbis. Muhammad ibn 'Abd al-Wahhab was a dedicated reader and student of Ibn Taymiyya's works, such as Al-Aqidah Al-Wasitiyya, Al-Siyasa Al-Shar'iyya, Minhaj al-Sunna and his various treatises attacking the cult of saints and certain forms of Sufism. Expressing great respect and admiration for Ibn Taymiyya; Ibn 'Abd al-Wahhab wrote:

I know of no one, who stands ahead of Ibn Taymiyya, after the Imam Ahmad Ibn Hanbal in the science of interpretation and the hadith

=== Loyalty and disassociation ===
According to the doctrine known as al-wala` wa al-bara` (literally, "loyalty and disassociation"), Ibn 'Abd al-Wahhab argued that it was "imperative for Muslims not to befriend, ally themselves with, or imitate non-Muslims or heretical Muslims", and that this "enmity and hostility of Muslims toward non-Muslims and heretical had to be visible and unequivocal". Even as late as 2003, entire pages in Saudi textbooks were devoted to explaining to undergraduates that all forms of Islam except Wahhabism were deviation. Shia critic Hamid Algar argued in 2002 that Saudi government had "discreetly concealed" this view from other Muslims "over the years" in order to depict itself as the defender of "Muslim interests".

In a reply dated 2003, the Saudi Arabian government "has strenuously denied the above allegations", including claims that "their government exports religious or cultural extremism or supports extremist religious education."

=== On Jihad ===
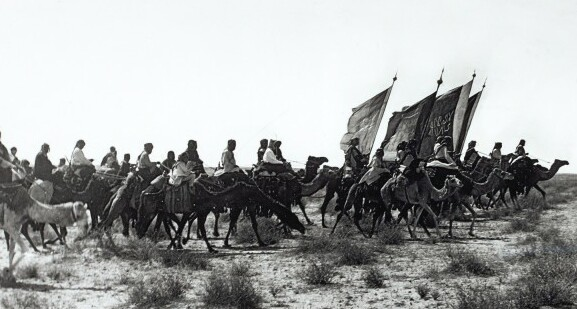
Soldiers of the third Saudi State, 1920s

Muhammad Ibn 'Abd al-Wahhab defined armed jihad as a sacred endeavour that must have a valid religious justification and which can only be declared by an Imam. The purpose of combat was to safeguard the community from the aggression and military attacks by various external threats. While early methods of his reformist efforts were based on preaching and educational efforts; state consolidation project of Emirate of Diriyah resulted in military conflicts with rival tribal chiefs. As a senior scholar, Ibn 'Abd al-Wahhab closely advised Emir Muhammad ibn Saud on military tactics; convincing him to pursue a largely defensive strategy and enjoining him to adhere to Islamic rules of warfare. The Emirate's soldiers were rigorously forbidden from launching attacks targeting women, children and non-combatant civilians.

Throughout his letters and treatises, Ibn ʿAbd al-Wahhāb maintained that the military campaigns of the Emirate of Dirʿiyya were strictly defensive and rebuked his opponents as being the first to initiate Takfir. Justifying the Wahhabi military campaigns as defensive operations against their enemies, Ibn 'Abd al-Wahhab asserts:

As for warfare, until today, we did not fight anyone, except in defense of our lives and honor. They came to us in our area and did not spare any effort in fighting us. We only initiated fighting against some of them in retaliation for their continued aggression, [The recompense for an evil is an evil like thereof] (42:40)... they are the ones who started declaring us to be unbelievers and fighting us

This defensive approach to warfare largely got abandoned after Ibn 'Abd al-Wahhab's retirement in 1773. Emir Abdulaziz, Muhammad ibn Saud's son and successor, was an advocate of expansionist policy and launched offensive military campaigns. The excesses reported to have committed by soldiers of Emirate of Diriyah were regularly rebuked by the traditional Wahhabi Aal al-Shaykhs (descendants of Ibn 'Abd al-Wahhab) who took care to condemn and religiously delegitimise war crimes. Condemning the military excesses committed during the Wahhabi conquest of Mecca in 1218–1803, Abdullah ibn Muhammad Aal Ash-Shaykh (1751–1829 CE/AH 1164–1244) stated:

As for the fact that some Bedouins destroyed books belonging to the people of Ta'if it was committed by the ignorant, who were admonished, along with others, from repeating this and similar actions. The stance that we take is that we do not take Arabs as captives and will not practice that in the future. We did not initiate hostilities against non-Arabs either, and we do not agree to killing of women and children.

=== Criticism of Shi'ism ===
Ibn 'Abd al-Wahhab considered some beliefs and practices of the Shia to violate the doctrine of monotheism. DeLong-Bas maintains that when Ibn Abd al-Wahhab denounced the Rafidah, he was not using a derogatory name for Shia but denouncing "an extremist sect" within Shiism who call themselves Rafidah. He criticized them for assigning greater authority to their current leaders than to Muhammad in interpreting the Qur'an and sharia, and for denying the validity of the consensus ('Ijma) of the early Muslim community. In his treatise "Risalah fi al-radd ala al-Rafidah" (Treatise/Letter on the Denial/Rejection Pertaining to the Rafidah), Ibn 'Abd al-Wahhab addressed thirty-two topics on points of both theology and law refuting the Raafida. In doing so, Ibn Abdul Wahhab spoke as a scholar who had studied Shi'i scholarly works, outlining a broad and systematic perspective of the Shi'i worldview and theology. He also believed that the Shia doctrine of infallibility of the imams constituted associationism with God. He instructed that this procedure of education and debate should be carried out with the support of truthful ulama, hadith transmitters, and righteous people employing logic, rhetoric, examination of the primary texts and scholarly debates.

Although Ibn 'Abd al-Wahhab and his son and successor 'Abdullah categorised various Shi'ite sects like Raafida, Zaydis, etc. as heretics and criticized many of their tenets, they had regarded them as Muslims. Abdullah's son, Sulayman (d. 1818) would articulate a new doctrine of Takfir which set the foundations for the excommunication of Shi'ites outside the pale of Islam. Sulayman's doctrines were revived by later scholars of the Muwahhidun like 'Abd al-Latif ibn 'Abd al-Rahman (1810–1876) during the Ottoman annexation of Al-Hasa in 1871. Al-Hasa was a Shi'ite majority area, and Ottoman invasion was assisted by the British. The Ottoman invasion had become a major danger to the Emirate of Nejd. From 1871, 'Abd al-Latif began to write tracts harshly condemning the Ottomans, Shi'ites and British as polytheists and called upon Muslims to boycott them. Integrating the concept of Hijra into his discourse of Takfir, 'Abd al-Latif also forbade Muslims to travel or stay in the lands of Ottomans, Rafidis, British, etc. 'Abd al-Latif viewed the Shi'ite sects of his time as idolators and placed them outside the pale of Islam.

=== Views on mysticism ===
According to Jeffry R. Halverson, the Muwahidun movement was characterised by a strong opposition to mysticism. Although this feature is typically attributed to the influence of the classical theologian Ibn Taymiyya, Jeffry Halverson states that Ibn Taymiyyah only opposed what he saw as Sufi excesses and never mysticism in itself, being himself a member of the Qadiriyyah Sufi order. DeLong-Bas writes that Ibn 'Abd al-Wahhab did not denounce Sufism or Sufis as a group, but rather attacked specific practices which he saw as inconsistent with the Qur'an and hadith.

When he was asked on a religious matter, Ibn 'Abd al-Wahhab praised the pious Sufis, stating:

Let it be known—may Allah guide you—that Allah Most High sent Muhammad (may Allah bless him and grant him peace) with guidance, which is known as the beneficial knowledge, and true religion, which are virtuous actions. ... among those who affiliate themselves to religion, there are those who focus on knowledge and fiqh and speak regarding it, such as the jurists, and those who focus on worship and the quest for the hereafter, such as the Sufis.

Scholars like Esther Peskes point to the cordial relations between the Muwahidun movement and the Sufi Shaykh Ahmad Ibn Idris and his followers in Mecca during the beginning of the 19th century; to aver that notions of absolute incompatibility between Sufism and Wahhabism are misleading. The early Wahhabi historiography had documented no mention that suggested any direct confrontations between Ibn 'Abd al-Wahhab and contemporary Sufis nor did it indicate that his activism was directed specifically against Sufism. Ibn 'Abd al-Wahhab's reforms were not aimed against socio-religious orientations such as Sufism; but were directed against the status quo prevalent in Islamic societies. Thus his efforts attempted a general transformation of Islamic societies, including Sufis and non-Sufis; the elite as well as the commoners. This resulted in the widespread desacralisation of the public sphere that heralded the advent of a new socio-political model in Arabia.

Explaining the stance of early Wahhabis on Tasawwuf, Abdullah Aal al-Shaykh (d. 1829 CE/AH 1244), son of Ibn 'Abd al-Wahhab writes:

My father and I do not deny or criticise the science of Sufism, but on the contrary we support it because it purifies the external and the internal of the hidden sins which are related to the heart and the outward form. Even though the individual might externally be on the right way, internally he might be on the wrong way. Sufism is necessary to correct it.

=== Views on modernity ===
Since the Arabian Peninsula was never occupied by colonial powers, it wasn't directly challenged by Western modernity until the mid-twentieth century, unlike the rest of the Islamic World. While the Saudi ruling class spearheaded modernization drive across the Kingdom; response of the religious establishment to the drastic influx of modernity was varied, ranging from scholars who rejected modern influences to tech-savvy clerics who eagerly embrace modern technology and social media. Various preachers harmonise pious lifestyle with modern culture while simultaneously engaging with Muslims of diverse backgrounds across the globe through social media networks. Assisted by scholarly guidance from a wide range of Islamic revivalists across the world like Abul Hasan Ali Nadvi, Abul A'la Maududi, etc. The Islamic University of Medina was established in 1961 to promote a pan-Islamic response to contemporary challenges and modern ideologies. To intellectually counter the ideological spread of Western liberalism, socialism and secular nationalism; numerous works of classical scholars like Ibn Kathir, Ibn Qudama, Ibn Hazm, Ibn Taymiyya, Ibn Qayyim, etc. were mass-distributed through Saudi publishing centres and during Pilgrimages.

On the other hand, some influential Wahhabi clerics had also been noteworthy for issuing various archaic fatawa such as declaring "that the sun orbited the Earth", and forbidding "women from riding bicycles on the grounds that they were "the devil's horses", and "from watching TV without veiling, just in case the presenters could see them through the screen". The most senior cleric in Saudi Arabia as of early 2022, Saleh Al-Fawzan, once issued a fatwa forbidding "all-you-can-eat buffets, because paying for a meal without knowing what you'll be eating is akin to gambling". Despite this, the contemporary Wahhabi religious framework has largely been able to maintain Saudi Arabia's global image as a pious society which is also aptly capable of addressing modern challenges.

To resolve the novel issues of the 20th century, King 'Abd al-Azeez ibn Saud appointed Muhammad ibn Ibrahim Aal Al-Shaykh (d. 1969) as the Grand Mufti in 1953 to head Dar al-Ifta, the legal body tasked with crafting Wahhabi juristic response to the novel problems faced by Arabian Muslims. In 1971, Dar al-Ifta was re-organized to include a larger number of elder scholars to boost its intellectual output. Dar al-Ifta headed by the Saudi Grand Mufti, consists of two agencies: i) Board of Senior Ulema (BSU) ii) Permanent Committee for Scientific Research and Legal Opinions (C.R.L.O). Wahhabi scholars advocated a positive approach to embracing technology, political affairs, etc. while maintaining a traditional stance on social issues. Contemporary fatwas also demonstrate a receptive outlook on visual media, medical field, economic affairs, etc. Dar al-Ifta became an influential institution in Arabian society and it sought a balanced approach to modernity; positioning itself between religious idealism and varying societal, economic and material demands. As a result, some scholars like Fandy Mamoun have stated that "In Saudi Arabia, different times and different places exist at once. Saudi Arabia is both a pre-modern and a post-modern society." The legal approach is characterized by taking from all law schools (Madhabs) through Scriptural precedents to sustain a legal system compatible with modernity.

In opposition to the Taqlid doctrine, Wahhabi scholars advocated the proof-evaluation theory which believes in the continuous appearance of absolute Mujtahids (Mujtahid Mutlaq) and claims an 'Ijma (scholarly consensus) that the doors of Ijtihad remain always open. This juristic approach had enabled flexibility in response of Wahhabi legal bodies to modernity. These include the encouragement of mass-media like television, internet, etc. to promote virtue. Internet would be made publicly accessible to Saudi citizens as early as 1997. In 2000 fatwa on the internet, Grand Mufti ʿAbd al-ʿAzīz Āal al-Shaykh explains:

In my opinion, the Internet is both a blessing and a curse at one and the same time. It is a blessing as long as it used for doing God's will, commanding good and forbidding wrong. However, it is liable to be evil when it aggravates God .... I call our leaders ... to impose Internet studies primarily in schools and among society.

In the financial sector, Wahhabi approach is based on Islamic economics. Islamic banking system is encouraged and digital transactions like credit cards have been sanctioned. Employing the results from observatories to sight the monthly Crescent moon is today permitted and preferred by the clerics. In the medical field, various fatwas legalising novel procedures like corneal transplant, autopsies, organ donations, etc. have been issued. In marital and gender-related issues, divorce is encouraged for incompatible marriages. On the issues of birth control, abortions and family planning, the legal bodies are conservative and generally prohibit them, viewing them as a contrary to Qur'anic commandments and Islamic principles to raise Muslim population. However, family planning measures are permitted in certain scenarios, wherein the legal principles of necessity are applicable. The Board of Senior Ulema (BSU) stated in a 1976 fatwa:

Birth control and contraception, due to fear of want (khishyat al-imlāq) are prohibited, since God guaranties the sustenance of His creatures. However, if birth control comes to avoid harm to the woman ... or in cases in which both spouses agree that it is in their best welfare to prevent or postpone a pregnancy, then birth control is permitted.

== Jurisprudence ==
Wahhabi approach to Fiqh radically challenged prevalent conventions of school Taqlid and was based on Ibn Taymiyya's broader theological call for a return to the values of the Salaf al-Salih. Of the four major sources in Sunni Fiqh – the Qur'an, the Sunna, 'Ijma (juristic consensus) and Qiyas (analogical reasoning) – Ibn 'Abd al-Wahhab's writings emphasized the Qur'an and Sunna. He used 'ijma only "in conjunction with its corroboration of the Qur'an and hadith" (and giving preference to the ijma of Muhammad's companions rather than the ijma of legal specialists after his time), and qiyas only in cases of extreme necessity. He rejected deference to past juridical opinion (taqlid) in favor of independent reasoning (ijtihad), and opposed using local customs. He urged his followers to "return to the primary sources" of Islam in order "to determine how the Qur'an and Muhammad dealt with specific situations" without being beholden to the interpretations of previous Islamic scholarship, while engaging in Ijtihad.

Historically, many established figures from Hanbalite and Shafiite schools were noteworthy for their denunciation of taqlid since the classical period. Influenced by these scholars, Ibn 'Abd al-Wahhab, fervently denounced Taqlid and upheld that the Gates of Ijtihad remained open. According to Edward Mortimer, it was imitation of past judicial opinion in the face of clear contradictory evidence from hadith or Qur'anic text that Ibn 'Abd al-Wahhab condemned. According to Ibn 'Abd al-Wahhab and his followers, God's commandments to obey Him alone and follow the Prophetic teachings, necessitated a complete adherence to Qur'an and hadith. This entailed a rejection of all interpretations offered by the four legal schools – including the Muwahhidun's own Hanbali school – wherein they contradict the two primary sources.

=== Perspective on other schools ===
Muhammad ibn 'Abd al-Wahhab asserted that every Muslim layman, even one without modest educational credentials, have a duty to read and study the Qur'an and the Sunnah; encouraging them to research religious scriptures. Regional rivals castigated him as a self-taught "ignorant" since "knowledge could come only from being taught by shaykhs" and not by treating the Scriptures as one's teacher. Although the issue of ijtihad and rejection of taqlid were central themes of his doctrines, Ibn 'Abd al-Wahhab did not lay down his approach to Usul-al Fiqh (Principles of Jurisprudence) comprehensively. Rather, that was left to his son-in-law and pupil Hamad ibn Nasir ibn Mu'ammar (d. 1811 CE/AH 1225), who would explicate a clarified Wahhabi position on Usul al-Fiqh, after Ibn 'Abd al-Wahhab. Moreover, in his writings, Ibn 'Abd al-Wahhab relied primarily only on hadith (Prophetic traditions) rather than opinions of early Hanbali jurists. This stance arose uncertainty over his formal affiliation to the Hanbali mad'hab and would lead many local Hanbalite detractors to accuse him of undermining classical fiqh in general. Despite their conceptual doctrine based on repudiation of taqlid (emulating legal precedent) to a legal school and jettisoning the juristic super-structure that developed after the Islamic fourth century; in-order to lower clerical resistance to their campaign; Wahhabis sustained the local juristic tradition of Najd, which was based on Hanbalism.

According to an expert on law in Saudi Arabia (Frank Vogel), Ibn 'Abd al-Wahhab himself "produced no unprecedented opinions". The "Wahhabis' bitter differences with other Muslims were not over fiqh rules at all, but over 'aqida, or theological positions". Professor of history at Dickinson College, David Commins also states that early disputes with other Muslims did not center on fiqh, and that the belief that the distinctive character of Wahhabism stems from Hanbali legal thought is a "myth". Some scholars are ambivalent as to whether Wahhabis belong to the Hanbali legal school. The Encyclopedia of Islam and the Muslim World maintains Wahhabis "rejected all jurisprudence that in their opinion did not adhere strictly to the letter of the Qur'an and the hadith". Cyril Glasse's The New Encyclopedia of Islam states that "strictly speaking", Wahhabis "do not see themselves as belonging to any school", and that in doing so they correspond to the ideal aimed at by Ibn Hanbal, and thus they can be said to be of his 'school'. According to DeLong-Bas, Ibn Abd al-Wahhab never directly claimed to be a Hanbali jurist, warned his followers about the dangers of adhering unquestionably to Fiqh, and did not consider "the opinion of any law school to be binding". In the absence of a hadith, he encouraged following the examples of the companions of Muhammad rather than following a law school. He did, however, follow the Hanbali methodology of judging everything not explicitly forbidden to be permissible, avoiding the use of qiyas (analogical reasoning), and taking maslaha (public interest) and 'adl (justice) into consideration.

=== Ibn Mu'ammar's Legal Theory ===
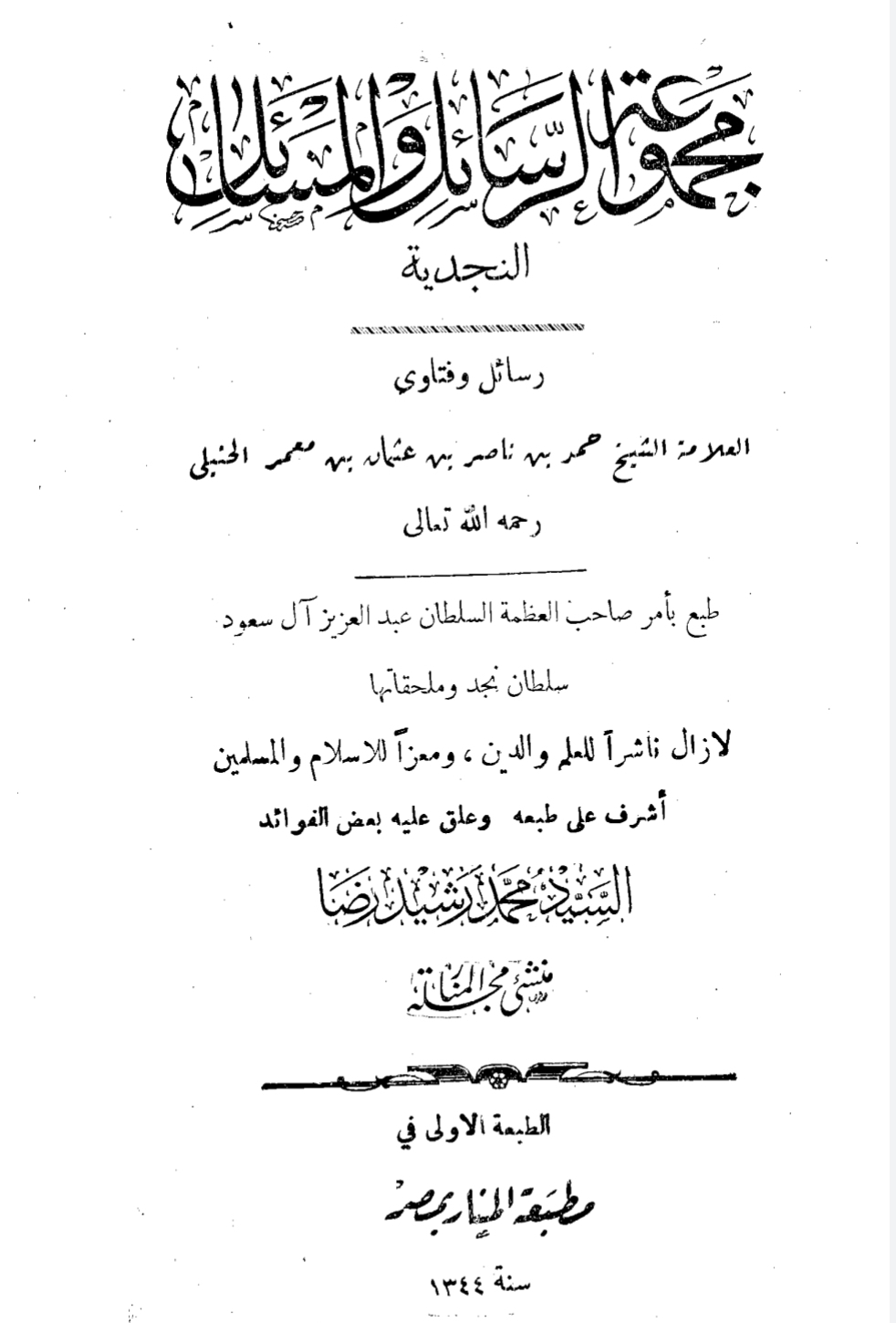
Compilation of ibn Mu'ammar's treatises and legal verdicts published by Sayyid Rashid Rida in 1925–1926 CE

While Ibn 'Abd al-Wahhab himself was not inclined to adhere to a particular madhab, many of his followers would perpetuate the Hanbali legal theory. Hanbali jurist Hamad ibn Nasir ibn Mu'ammar (AH 1160–1125/ 1747–1810 CE) laid out a comprehensive legal theory in his treatises like Risala al-Ijtihad wal Taqlid ("Treatise on Ijtihad and Taqlid") which became influential in the scholarly circles of the Muwahhidun. Ibn Mu'ammar believed that maintaining the practice of Ijtihad in every era was a religious obligation and tasked the Islamic scholars for carrying out this responsibility. This was to be done through proof evaluation from the Scriptures and by employing Usul al-Fiqh (Principles of Jurisprudence). Based on one's expertise and knowledge, Ibn Mu'ammar ranked a hierarchy of Fuqaha (Islamic jurists) for carrying out the duty of issuing fatwas. At the top was the absolute Mujtahid who issues verdicts solely based on the principles (Usul) of his madhab by independently determining the preponderant view from all the possible scenarios tracked down by himself as well as supplement the former rulings. After this came the 3 levels of partial Ijtihad which limited the scope of research: initially just to the past opinions, then to the rulings found in the 4 madhabs and finally to the views within one's own madhab. The lowest of Ibn Mu'ammar's hierarchy constituted the non-Mujtahid laity who are required to directly engage with the Scriptural sources in consultation with scholars, as well as by analysing past scholarly works. Thus, Ibn Mu'ammar's legal theory strived for the reconciliation between the reformist programme of the Muwahhidin and the classical jurisprudential structures. What made Ibn Mu'ammar's proposed system unique was its "microcosmic" and flexible nature; which permitted the scholars to simultaneously represent different ranks within the hierarchy to carry out their responsibilities of Ijtihad.

The Wahhabi legal theory stipulated proof-evaluation based on Hanbali principles as one of its major hallmarks. By claiming themselves as Hanbali, Muwahhidun scholars implied directly adhering to the five Usul al-Fiqh (Principles of jurisprudence) of the Hanbali school. Despite the main methodology of Wahhabi movement being derived from Hanbalite Ahl al-Hadith, scholars also take the rulings from other Madhhabs, as long they regard them as being verified through Hadith and traditions or Sunnah authenticated by Sahabah. (Qaul Sahabiyyah according to modern contemporary Muslim scholars). Prominent Wahhabi scholar Muhammad ibn Salih al-Uthaymeen derived rulings from the Shafiite jurisprudence in his commentary of The Meadows of the Righteous book authored by al-Nawawi, wherein the Ijtihad (reasoning) of Abu Hurairah was taken by al-Nawawi for rulings of Wudu (ablution ritual).

== Social reform ==
Muhammad ibn 'Abd al-Wahhab concerned himself with the social reformation of his people. He stressed the importance of education, especially for females and encouraged women to be active in educational endeavours and lead various communal and social activities. Diriyah had become a major centre of learning and foreign travellers often noted the higher literacy rates of townsfolk of Central Arabia. In line with his methodology, Ibn 'Abd al-Wahhab also denounced the practice of instant triple talaq, counting it as only a single talaq (regardless of the number of pronouncements). The outlawing of triple talaq has been considered to be one of the most significant reforms in the Islamic World in the 20th and 21st centuries. As an 18th-century reformer, Muhammad ibn Abd al Wahhab advocated Ijtihad of qualified scholars in accordance with the teachings of Qur'an and Hadeeth. His thoughts reflected the major trends apparent in the 18th-century Islamic reform movements. Numerous significant socio-economic reforms would be advocated by the Imam during his lifetime. After his death, his followers continued his legacy. Notable jurists like Ibn Mu'ammar (AH 1160–1225/ 1747–1810 CE) would issue ground-breaking fatwas (legal verdicts) on contemporary issues such as authorization of small-pox vaccinations; at a time when opposition to small-pox vaccinations was widespread among the scientific and political elites of Europe. Many women were influential in various reformist endeavours of the Muwahhidun; such as mass-education, communal activities, campaigns against superstitions, etc. These included Ibn 'Abd al-Wahhab's own daughter Fatimah, a revered Islamic scholar who travelled far and wide; and taught numerous men and women. However, future events such as the destruction of the Emirate of Diriyah in the Wahhabi Wars of 1818, subsequent persecution of Salafis and other Islamic reformers, etc. would result in a halt to the social reforms implemented by the Wahhabi jurists and their suspicions towards the outside world would linger throughout the 19th century.

With the resurgence of rising reform currents of Salafiyya across the Muslim world from the late 19th century, the Wahhabis of Najd too underwent a rejuvenation. After the establishment of the Third Saudi State and Unification of Saudi Arabia, a Salafiyya Global movement would crystallise with the backing of a state. Ibn Saud's reforms would get criticism from zealots amongst some of his Wahhabi clergy-men; reminiscent of the 19th-century harshness. However, other ulema would allow them, eventually paving way for gradual reforms in KSA. Thus, new education policies would be approved that taught foreign languages, sciences, geography, etc. Overruling the objections of Ikhwan, the Wahhabi ulema would permit the introduction of telegraph and other wireless communication systems. Soon after, oil industries would be developed with the discovery of petroleum. Influential clerics such as Mufti Muhammad ibn Ibrahim Aal ash-Shaykh would endorse female education.

=== Politics ===
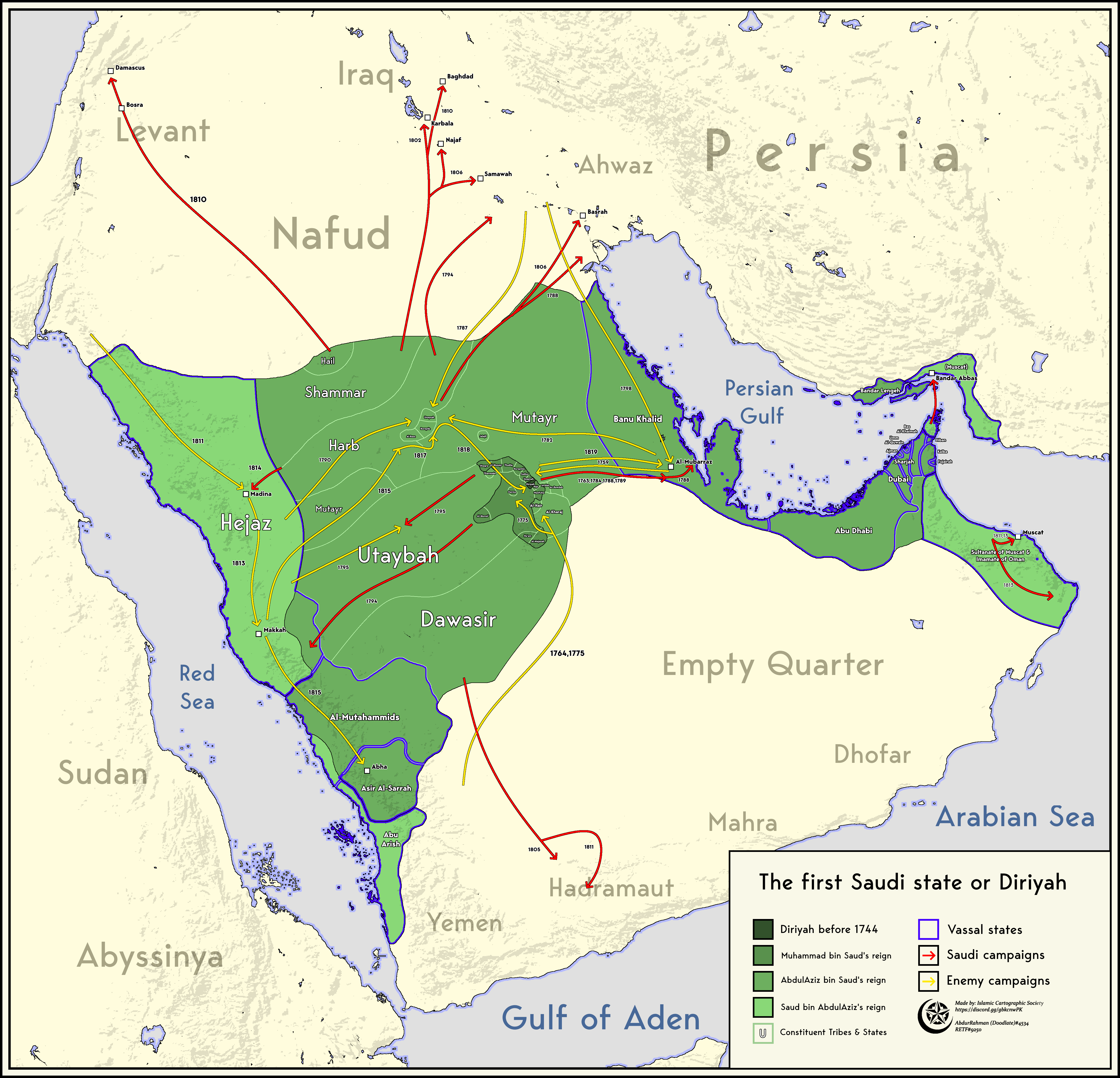
Military campaigns and political expansion of the Emirate of Diriyah (1744 – 1814 CE)

According to ibn 'Abd al-Wahhab; there are three objectives for Islamic government and society: "to believe in Allah, enjoin good behavior, and forbid wrongdoing". This doctrine has been sustained in missionary literature, sermons, fatwa rulings, and explications of religious doctrine by Wahhabis since the death of ibn 'Abd al-Wahhab. Ibn 'Abd al-Wahhab saw a role for the Imam, "responsible for religious matters", and the Amir, "in charge of political and military issues". Despite this, in Saudi history; the Imam had not been a religious preacher or scholar, but Muhammad ibn Saud and the subsequent Saudi dynastic rulers.

He also believed that the Muslim ruler is owed unquestioned allegiance as a religious obligation from his subjects; so long as he leads the community according to the laws of God (Shari'ah). A Muslim must present a bay'ah (oath of allegiance) to a Muslim ruler during his lifetime to ensure his redemption after death. Any counsel given to a ruler from community leaders or ulama should be private, not through public acts such as petitions, demonstrations, etc. This principle caused confusion during the dynastic disputes of the Second Saudi State during the late 19th century, when rebels succeeded in overthrowing the monarch, to become ruler. While it gave the king a wide range of power, respecting shari'a does impose limits, such as giving qadi (Islamic judges) independence. This meant non-interference in their deliberations, as well as not codifying laws, following precedents or establishing a uniform system of law courts – both of which violate the qadi's independence.

Wahhabis have traditionally given their allegiance to the House of Saud, but a movement of "Salafi jihadis" has emerged in the contemporary among those who believe that Al-Saud has abandoned the laws of God. According to Zubair Qamar, while the "standard view" is that "Wahhabis are apolitical and do not oppose the State", there is another "strain" of Wahhabism that "found prominence among a group of Wahhabis after the fall of the second Saudi State in the 1800s", and post 9/11 is associated with Jordanian/Palestinian scholar Abu Muhammad al-Maqdisi and "Wahhabi scholars of the 'Shu'aybi' school".

Wahhabis share the belief of Islamists such as the Muslim Brotherhood in Islamic dominion over politics and government and the importance of da'wah (proselytizing or preaching of Islam) not just towards non-Muslims but towards erroring Muslims. However Wahhabi preachers are conservative and do not deal with concepts such as social justice, anticolonialism, or economic equality, expounded upon by Islamist Muslims. Ibn 'Abd al-Wahhab's original pact promised whoever championed his message, 'will, by means of it, rule and lands and men'." While socio-political issues constituted a major aspect of his reformist programme, Ibn 'Abd al-Wahhab nonetheless didn't advocate revolutionary overthrowal of the ruling order to establish a Caliphate across the Muslim world. Following the classical Sunni understanding, Ibn 'Abd al-Wahhab advocated accommodation with the status quo, stating:

For a very long time, since before the time of Imam Ahmad, till nowadays, the people have not united under one single ruler. Nor is it known from any of the scholars that there is any ruling which is invalid except with the greater imam (al-imam al-a'zam).

18th and 19th century European travellers, ambassadors and writers considered the Muwahhidun as championing an "Islamic revolution" that campaigned for a pristine Islam stripped of all complex rituals, cultural accretions, superstitions, etc. and a simpler creedal ethos based on universal brotherhood and fraternity; analogous to various European frondeurs during the Age of Revolutions. Contemporary European diplomats and observers who witnessed its emergence drew parallels with the American and French revolutions in Wahhabi opposition to Ottoman clerical hierarchy and foreign imperialism; with some even labelling them as "Wahhabi Jacobins" and its reformist efforts as a sort of "Protestantism".

Cambridge historian Christopher Allen Bayly noted that the religious movement of the Arabian Muwahhidun also had a revolutionary political programme comparable to the European revolutions in the 18th and 19th centuries. The difference lay in their political language; wherein themes of anti-imperialism, opposition to foreign aggression, promotion of civic values, duties & rights, etc. were conveyed to the local populace in terms of Islamic values. Tracing the movement's popularity to the wider phenomenon of Ottoman decline, the far-reaching impacts of the French revolution on the Arab world; and deciphering the sudden collapse of its revolutionary Emirate to invasion by military despots of the old order; Bayly wrote:

the Wahhabi revolt against intrusive Ottoman rule and the decline of proper religious observance in the cities of Saudi Arabia should be regarded as a variety of world revolution .... Ibn Saud's revolt began in the 1740s, before the American and European revolutions, but arose as an analogous response to the pressures of taxation and state interference in formerly independent communities .... [T]he influence of Wahhabism persisted indirectly across the Muslim world, inspiring imitations and reactions among the Muslim Sufi brotherhoods of North and East Africa over the next hundred years .... [I]f we examine the social roots of revolution, the word may be appropriate for these events within Islam .... [T]hese were often revolts of underprivileged suburbanites, the semi-settled bedouin on the fringe of the Muslim urban economies. These revolts exemplified that perennial conflict between the nomad and the city noted by Ibn Khaldun in the Middle Ages.

== Prevalence ==
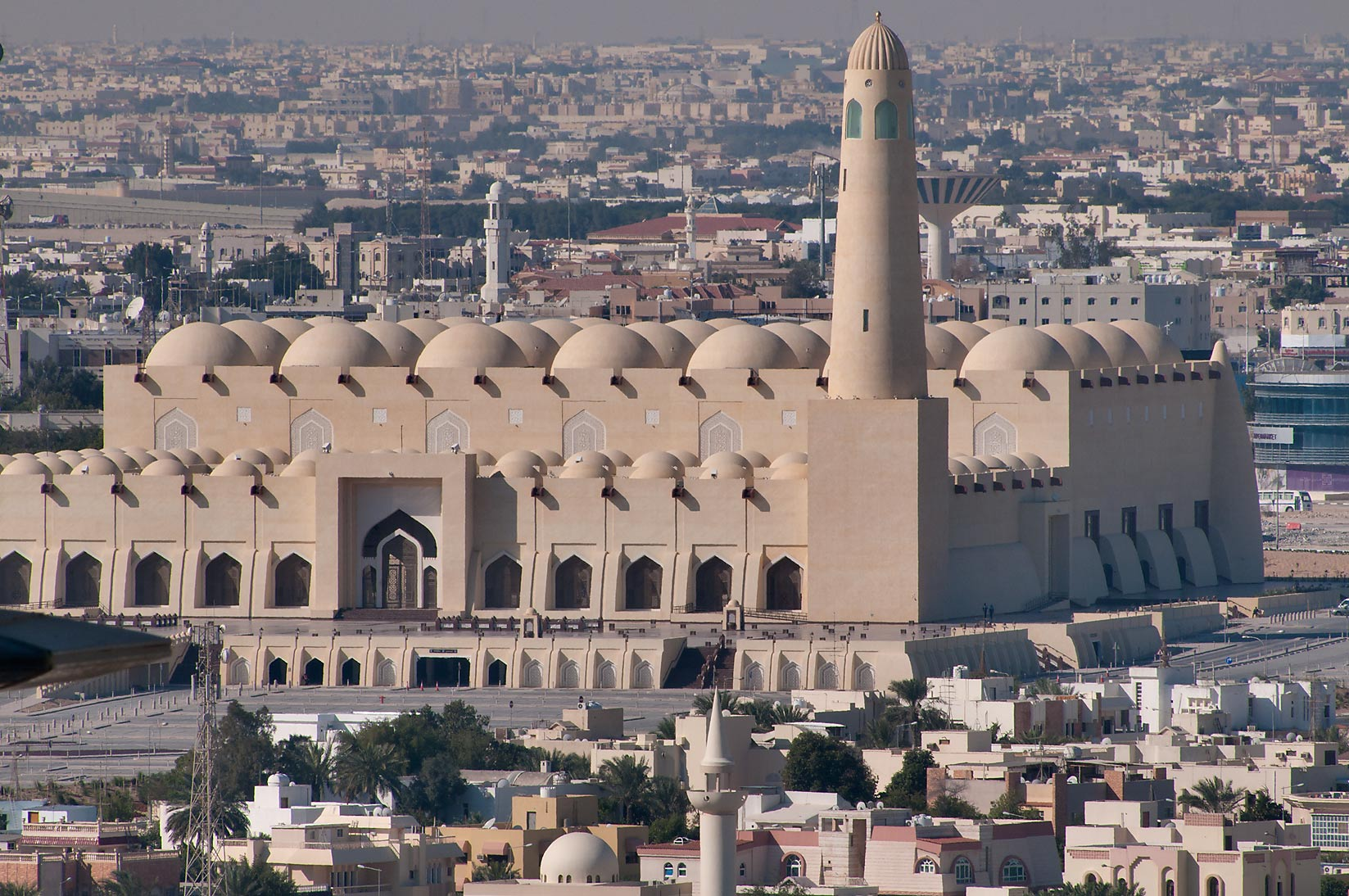
The Imam Muhammad ibn Abd al-Wahhab Mosque in Doha, Qatar

The Wahhabi movement, while predominant across Saudi Arabia, was established from the Najd region, and it is there that its conservative practices have the strongest support, more so than in regions in the kingdom to the east or west of it. (Note: at least one scholar (David Commins), sometimes refers to Wahhabism as the "Najdi reform movement", "Najdi movement", "Najdi doctrine", and "Najdi mission") Cyril Glasse credits the softening of some Wahhabi doctrines and practices outside of the Najd region on the conquest of the Hejaz region "with its more cosmopolitan traditions and the traffic of pilgrims which the new rulers could not afford to alienate". Aside from Saudi Arabia, the only other country whose native population is predominantly Wahhabi is the adjacent gulf monarchy of Qatar. Estimates of the number of adherents to Wahhabism vary. (Note: Other sources give far lower numbers of Shia though they do not estimate the number of Wahhabi. 15% of KSA is Shia.)

The "boundaries" of Wahhabism have been called "difficult to pinpoint", but in contemporary usage, the terms "Wahhabi" and "Salafi" are sometimes used interchangeably, and they are considered to be movements with different roots that have merged since the 1960s. (Note: Salafism has been termed a hybridation between the teachings of Ibn Abdul-Wahhab and others which have taken place since the 1960s.) However, Wahhabism is generally recognised as form of Salafism", contextualised as an ultra-conservative, Saudi brand of the wider movement. Muhammad Iqbal, praised the 18th-century Najdi movement as "the first throb of life in modern Islam", and noted that its influence on 19th-century religious reformers was "traceable, directly or indirectly [in] nearly all the great modern movements of Muslim Asia and Africa".

== Notable leaders ==
There has traditionally been a recognized head of the Wahhabi "religious estate", often a member of Al ash-Sheikh (a descendant of Muhammad ibn 'Abd al-Wahhab) or related to another religious head. For example, Abd al-Latif was the son of Abd al-Rahman ibn Hasan.

- Muhammad ibn 'Abd al-Wahhab (1703–1792) was the founder of the Wahhabi movement.
- 'Abd Allah ibn Muhammad ibn 'Abd al-Wahhab (1752–1826) was the head of Wahhabism after his father retired from public life in 1773. After the fall of the first Saudi emirate, Abd Allah went into exile in Cairo where he died.
- Sulayman ibn 'Abd Allah (1780–1818) was a grandson of Muhammad ibn Abd al-Wahhab and author of an influential treatise that restricted travel to and residing in land of idolaters.
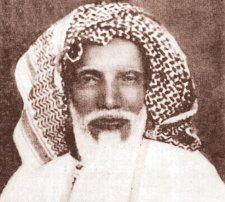
  Influential Hanbali jurist and Mufassir ʿAbd al-Raḥmān ibn Nāṣir al-Siʿdī (Arabic: عبد الرحمن بن ناصر السعدي; AH 1307–1376)
- 'Abd al-Rahman ibn Hasan (1780–1869) was head of the religious estate in the second Saudi emirate.
- 'Abd al-Latif ibn 'Abd al-Rahman (1810–1876) Head of religious estate in 1860 and early 1870s.
- Ahmad al-Hifzi (1732–1818) was a former Sufi mystic who left Sufism under influence of Wahhabi missionaries; later becoming the head of the Wahhabi movement in Asir in the early 19th century.
- Abd Allah ibn Abd al-Latif Al ash-Sheikh (1848–1921) was the head of religious estate during period of Rashidi rule and the early years of King Abd al-Aziz ibn Saud.
- Muhammad ibn Ibrahim Al ash-Sheikh (1893–1969) was the head of Wahhabism in mid twentieth century. He has been said to have "dominated the Wahhabi religious estate and enjoyed unrivaled religious authority".
- Ghaliyya al-Wahhabiyya was a Bedouin woman from the town of Turubah who rose to the rank of "Amira al-Umara" (generalissimo) and led Wahhabi forces in defending Mecca during the Ottoman–Wahhabi war.
- 'Abd al-Azeez ibn Baz (1910–1999) has been called "the most prominent proponent" of Wahhabism during his time.
- Muhammad ibn al-Uthaymeen (1925–2001) is another "giant". According to David Dean Commins, no one "has emerged" with the same "degree of authority in the Saudi religious establishment" since their deaths.

== International influence and propagation ==
During the Cold War, the United States and the United Kingdom, launched covert and overt campaigns to encourage and strengthen Islamists in the Middle East and southern Asia. These Islamists were seen as a hedge against potential expansion by the Soviet Union, and as a counterweight against nationalists and socialists that were seen as a threat to the interests of the Western nations. An internal U.S. State Department memo reporting a meeting between President Eisenhower with US Secretary of State John F. Dulles and the Joint Chiefs of Staff in 1957 stated the following:

The President said he thought we should do everything possible to stress the "holy war" aspect. Mr. Dulles commented that if the Arabs have a "holy war" they would want it to be against Israel. The President recalled, however, that Saud, after his visit here, had called on all Arabs to oppose Communism. He said he thought we should at once send an emissary out to Saud who had asked for such an individual three times in order to avoid having to send messages through his diplomatic channels.

Da'wah Wahhabiyya, or the Wahhabi mission, is the idea of spreading Wahhabism throughout the world. Tens of billions of dollars have been spent by the Saudi government and charities on mosques, schools, education materials, scholarships, throughout the world to promote the Wahhabi influences. Tens of thousands of volunteers and several billion dollars also went in support of the jihad against the atheist communist regime governing Afghanistan. According to political scientist Alex Alexiev, the impetus for the international propagation of Salafism and Wahhabism was "the largest worldwide propaganda campaign ever mounted." David A. Kaplan described the push as "dwarfing the Soviets' propaganda efforts at the height of the Cold War".

In a 2018 interview, Mohammed bin Salman, the de facto ruler of Saudi Arabia, said that Saudi Arabia's International propagation of the Salafi movement and Wahhabism campaign "was rooted in the Cold War, when allies asked Saudi Arabia to use its resources to prevent inroads in Muslim countries by the Soviet Union." A report commission by the European Parliament identified Wahhabism as the main source of global terrorism.

=== Explanation for influence ===
Khaled Abou El Fadl listed four major factors that contributed to expansion of Wahhabi ideas across the Islamic World:

- The appeal of Arab nationalism, which considered the Ottoman Empire to be a foreign occupying power and took a powerful precedent from the Wahhabi rebellion against the Ottomans
- Wahhabi calls for a return to the pristine Islam of the Salaf al-Salih (righteous predecessors) which rejected much of the classical legal precedents; instead deriving directly from Qur'an, Hadith and the sayings of the Salaf; through Ijtihad. This also appealed to the Islamic reformers who pushed for a revival of ijtihad, and a direct return to the original sources for interpreting the Qur'an and Sunnah, to seek solutions to the present day problems.
- Control of Mecca and Medina, which allowed the King of Saudi Arabia to take the mantle of "Custodian of the Two Holy Mosques". This enabled the Wahhabis to exert great influence on Islamic culture and thinking;
- Saudi Oil industry, especially after its boom during the 1970s energy crisis, allowed Saudi Arabia to successfully promote their interpretations of Islam throughout the Islamic World.

Peter Mandaville lists two more reasons:

- Societal factors: With the influx of modernity, younger generations of Muslims increasingly departed from the "localized" religious understanding of their parents and looked up to a pan-Islamic outlook authentically rooted in Scriptures and early generations of Salaf al-Salih
- Rise of other native Islamic reformist movements such as the Ahl-e Hadith in South Asia and the Salafiyya movement in the Arab world which shared a common religious outlook. These movements expanded collaboration in various socio-economic, political and educational fields and formed a joint intellectual alliance. Additionally, influential conservative reform movements like Deobandism began co-operating with Wahhabis to a certain extent, despite doctrinal variations

According to French scholar and critic of Islamism Gilles Kepel, the tripling in the price of oil in the mid-1970s and the progressive takeover of Saudi Aramco in the 1974–1980 period, provided the source of much influence of Wahhabism in the Islamic World. (Note: ... the financial clout of Saudi Arabia had been amply demonstrated during the oil embargo against the United States, following the Arab-Israeli war of 1973. This show of international power, along with the nation's astronomical increase in wealth, allowed Saudi Arabia's puritanical, conservative Wahhabite faction to attain a preeminent position of strength in the global expression of Islam. Saudi Arabia's impact on Muslims throughout the world was less visible than that of Khomeini's Iran, but the effect was deeper and more enduring ... it reorganized the religious landscape by promoting those associations and ulamas who followed its lead, and then, by injecting substantial amounts of money into Islamic interests of all sorts, it won over many more converts. Above all, the Saudis raised a new standard – the virtuous Islamic civilization – as foil for the corrupting influence of the West.)

=== Funding ===
Estimates of Saudi spending on religious causes abroad include "upward of $100 billion"; $2–3 billion per year since 1975 (compared to the annual Soviet propaganda budget of $1 billion/year); and "at least $87 billion" from 1987 to 2007. Reliability of these rough estimates have been disputed due to their inconsistencies and lack of a scientific methodology for precise quantification.

Its largesse funded an estimated "90% of the expenses of the entire faith", throughout the Muslim world, according to journalist Dawood al-Shirian. It extended to young and old, from children's madrasas to high-level scholarship. "Books, scholarships, fellowships, mosques" (for example, "more than 1,500 mosques were built from Saudi public funds over the last 50 years") were paid for. It rewarded journalists and academics, who followed it and built satellite campuses around Egypt for Al Azhar, the oldest and most influential Islamic university. Yahya Birt counts spending on "1,500 mosques, 210 Islamic centres and dozens of Muslim academies and schools". Apart from state patronage, a major source of proselytization has been the private charities and religious activities of Muslim individuals and organizations.

This financial aid has done much to overwhelm less strict local interpretations of Islam, according to observers like Dawood al-Shirian and Lee Kuan Yew, arguing that it caused the Saudi interpretation (sometimes called "petro-Islam") to be perceived as the correct interpretation – or the "gold standard" of Islam – in many Muslims' minds.

Peter Mandaville asserts that the commonly reported data estimates regarding Saudi religious funding are unreliable due to the sources being "internally inconsistent" and based on "non-specific hearsay". According to Mandaville, the wide-ranging and controversial usage of the term "Wahhabism" has rendered researching Saudi religious transnationalism and assessing its actual magnitude even more confusing. Moreover, the post-Cold War era governments had commonly used the label "Wahhabism" to designate a wide swathe of religious sects, including those which were doctrinally at odds with Wahhabism.

=== Militant and political Islam ===
Allegations of links between Wahhabism proper and the ideology of militant Islamists such as al-Qaeda and Islamic State, have been disputed. Throughout the 20th century Board of Senior Ulema (BSU) of the Dar al-Ifta in Saudi Arabia, were known for issuing fatawa which strongly condemned various forms of war crimes and terrorism, in line with Islamic military jurisprudence. In a well-known fatwa issued at its 32nd session in Ta'if on 25 August 1988, the board members recommended the death penalty for acts of terrorism. Moreover, the Wahhabi ulema of Saudi Arabia had ruled the illegality of all forms of suicide bombings, including in Israel. The doctrine of suicide bombings which started appearing in the manuals of various Egyptian extremists during the 1970s and 1980s; has been rejected as heretical by the Wahhabi scholars. Jonathan Sozek reports that while Bin Laden self-identified as a Salafist, he was not affiliated with the Wahhabi movement.

The Yemeni origins of the Bin Laden family also reflected a non-Wahhabi heritage. Bin Laden's feud with the Saudi government intensified during the Gulf War; prompting Saudi authorities to place Bin Laden under house arrest in 1991, before exiling him the same year. In 1994, Saudi Arabia revoked Bin Laden's citizenship and froze all his assets, turning him into a fugitive and the Bin Laden family disowned him. After Saudi pressure on Sudan, the Al-Qaeda leader sought refuge under the Taliban government in Afghanistan. Taliban's denial of Saudi requests to extradite Bin Laden led to a diplomatic row between Afghanistan and Saudi Arabia. Throughout the 1990s, mainstream Wahhabi clerics in the Kingdom supported US-Saudi alliance against Ba'athist Iraq during the Gulf War and condemned terrorist acts by Al-Qaeda. Anti-establishment Wahhabi scholars have also been vehemently opposed to tactics advocated by Bin Laden, not withstanding their opposition to American foreign policy in West Asia. Scholars like Professor F. Gregory Gause have strongly opposed hysterical assertions made by war hawks in the Bush administration, contrasting their portrayals of Wahhabism with attempts made by far-right militants to appropriate American patriotism.

== Contemporary discourse ==
In contemporary discourse, the post-Soviet states widely employ the term "Wahhabism" to denote any manifestation of Islamic assertion in neighbouring Muslim countries. During the Soviet-era, the Muslim dissidents were usually labelled with terms such as "Sufi" and "fanatic" employing Islamophobic discourses that aroused hysteria of an underground religious activists threatening the stability of the Marxist order. By the late 1990s, the "Wahhabi" label would become the most common term to refer to the alleged "Islamic menace" in state propaganda, while "Sufism" was invoked as a "moderate" force that balanced the "radicalism" of those who were being accused as "Wahhabis". The old-guard of the post-Soviet states found the label useful to depict all opposition as extremists, thereby bolstering their 'strongman' credentials. In short, any Muslim critical of the religious or political status quo, came at risk of being labelled "Wahhabi".

According to M. Reza Pirbhai, Associate Professor of History at Georgetown University, notions of a "Wahhabi conspiracy" against the West have in recent times resurfaced in various sections of the Western media; employing the term as a catch-all phrase to frame an official narrative that erases the concerns of broad and disparate disenchanted groups pursuing redress for local discontentment caused by neo-colonialism. The earliest mention of "Wahhabism" in The New York Times had appeared in a 1931 editorial which described it as a "traditional" movement; without associating it with "militant" or "anti-Western" trends. Between 1931 and 2007, The New York Times published eighty-six articles that mentioned the word "Wahhabism", out of which six articles had appeared before September 2001, while the rest were published since. During the 1990s, it began to be described as "militant", but not yet as a hostile force. By the 2000s, the 19th century terminology of "Wahhabism" had resurfaced, reprising its role as the " 'fanatical' and 'despotic' antithesis of a civilized world. Reza Pirbhai asserts that this use is deployed to manufacture an official narrative that assists imperial purposes by depicting a coherent and coordinated international network of ideological revolutionaries. Common neo-liberal depictions of Wahhabism define it as a collection of restrictive dogmas, particularly for women, while neo-conservative depictions portray "Wahhabis" as "savages" or "fanatics".

== Criticism and support ==
=== Criticism by other Muslims ===
Wahhabism has been criticized by traditional Muslims as a deviant sect sometimes in Satanic terms. Many Sunnis and Shias do not view Wahhabism as a revival or reform movement, but as a separate sect. It is not so much strict and uncompromising as aberrant, going beyond the bounds of Islam in its restricted definition of tawhid (Islamic monotheistic tenets), and much too willing to commit takfir (excommunicate) Muslims found in violation of Wahhabi doctrines. According to some critics, during the second Wahhabi-Saudi conquest of the Arabian Peninsula, an estimated 400,000 were killed or wounded according to some estimates. However, the claim of the 400,000 casualties has been debunked in recent research and is regarded by academic scholars as an exaggerated figure which was fabricated during the 1990s. More reliable estimates place the number of dead and wounded between 10,000 and 25,000. Some Muslims also consider Wahhabism to be outside of Islam; a form of apostasy. Other Muslims see Wahhabism as being created by Imperialists in an attempt to divide and weaken the Muslim World. Muhammad bin Saud's agreement to wage jihad to spread Ibn 'Abd al-Wahhab's teachings has been linked to Najdi practice of raiding – "instinctive fight for survival and appetite for lucre" – rather than with religion.

From a theological perspective, Wahhabism has been linked to the Horn of Najd, which allegedly predicted the arrival of the Devil or the False Prophet, the place where Wahhabism was founded. This view is further supported by Sunni Clerics of Al-Azhar who declared Wahhabism to be "a satanic faith which has led to division, debate, dishonesty, and mistrust of Muslims". The doctrines upheld by Wahhabism are considered as deviant from traditional Islamic teachings. The rejection of taqlid (imitation of juristic precedent) and advocate opening of ijtihad (independent legal judgement) would have resulted in various ideological pretensions that "erode the very essence of Islam". Sufi traditionalists strongly emphasize the necessity of taqlid to the four major madhhabs (legal schools) and invoke the teachings and legacy of its founders to defend the madhhab-based legal system. The rejection of the "orthodox" belief in saints, a belief which had become a cardinal doctrine in Sunni Islam very early on, represents a departure from something which has been an "integral part of Islam ... for over a millennium."

=== Initial criticism ===
It has been reported that Ibn Abd al-Wahhab's father was critical of his son. The dispute arose when Ibn 'Abd al-Wahhab began his public da'wa activities in Huraymila. However, none of the sources state the exact nature of this disagreement. Salafi scholar al-Uthaymin noted that it probably was not concerning an issue of 'Aqidah (beliefs) as Ibn 'Abd al-Wahhab, "did not lend any support to the saint-cults and other false practices". It is speculated that they disputed over payment of judges in solving disputes and in the manner of giving da'wa, spreading Islamic teachings. Until his father's death in AH 1153; Muhammad ibn 'Abd al-Wahhab was not overly active and public in his da'wah efforts.

Ibn 'Abd al-Wahhab's brother allegedly wrote a book in refutation of his brother's new teachings, called: "The Final Word from the Qur'an, the Hadith, and the Sayings of the Scholars Concerning the School of Ibn 'Abd al-Wahhab", also known as: "Al-Sawa`iq al-Ilahiyya fi Madhhab al-Wahhabiyya" ("The Divine Thunderbolts Concerning the Wahhabi School"). It has been reported that his brother repented and eventually returned to his call.

In "The Refutation of Wahhabism in Arabic Sources, 1745–1932", Hamadi Redissi provides original references to the description of Wahhabis as a divisive sect (firqa) and outliers (Kharijites) in communications between Ottomans and Egyptian Khedive Muhammad Ali. Redissi details refutations of Wahhabis by scholars (muftis); among them Ahmed Barakat Tandatawin, who in 1743 describes Wahhabism as ignorance (Jahala).

==== Sunni criticism ====
Turkish columnist Ekrem Buğra Ekinci wrote an article in the pro-AKP newspaper Daily Sabah, in which he argued against classifying Wahhabism as part of Sunnism. According to British writer Simon Ross Valentine, Wahhabism has been vehemently criticized by many Sunni Muslims and some Islamic scholars in the strongest terms as a "new faction, a vile sect".

In the 18th century, prominent Ottoman Hanafi scholar Ibn Abidin declared the Wahhabi movement of Muhammad ibn 'Abd al-Wahhab to be a modern-day manifestation of the Kharijites. He said:

In our time Ibn Abdal Wahhab Najdi appeared, and attacked the two noble sanctuaries (Makkah and Madinah). He claimed to be a Hanbali, but his thinking was such that only he alone was a Muslim, and everyone else was a polytheist! Under this guise, he said that killing the Ahl as-Sunnah was permissible, until Allah destroyed them (Wahhabi's) in the year 1233 AH by way of the Muslim army.

The followers of Muhammad Ibn 'Abd al-Wahhab considered the ideas of the Hanbali theologian Ahmad Ibn Taymiyya (d. 1328 CE) highly attractive and made him their central classical scholarly reference. However, for centuries Ibn Taymiyya's thoughts were mostly ignored by those who constituted the scholarly mainstream; who would accuse the Wahhabis for overemphasizing the scholarly works of Ibn Taymiyya. It was only during the 19th century that Ibn Taymiyya came to exercise prominent scholarly influence over Muslim youth and by the 20th century he would be a major reference for Islamic revolutionaries. On the other hand, Ibn 'Abd al-Wahhab would deny that he had bias towards Ibn Taymiyya; and states in Hadiyya al-Thaniyya:

Ibn Qayyim and his illustrious teacher Ibn Taymiyyah were both righteous leaders according to the Sunni school of thought and their writings are dear to my heart, but I do not follow them rigidly in all matters.

Another early rebuttal of Wahhabism came from the Sunni Sufi jurist Ibn Jirjis, who argued that supplicating the saints is permitted to whoever "declares that there is no god but God and prays toward Mecca" for, according to him, supplicating the saints is not a form of worship but merely calling out to them, and that worship at graves is not idolatry unless the supplicant believes that buried saints have the power to determine the course of events. These arguments were specifically rejected as heretical by the Wahhabi leader at the time.

===== Turkey =====
The leader of the Gulen movement, Fethullah Gülen accused Arabs of conspiring against the Ottoman Empire as well as reducing Islam strictly to Wahhabism and Arab norms.

===== South Asia =====
Opposition to Wahhabism emerged in South Asia during the early 19th century; which was led by prominent Islamic scholar and theologian Fazl-e-Haq Khairabadi (1796–1861). By the late 19th century, the anti-Wahhabi campaign in South Asia was led by Ahmed Raza Khan (1856–1921) and his disciples, who engaged in extensive written refutations and polemics against Wahhabism. His movement became known as the Barelvi movement and was defined by rejection of Wahhabi beliefs.

===== Lebanon =====
The transnational Lebanon-based Al-Ahbash movement uses takfir against Wahhabi and Salafi leaders. The head of Al-Ahbash, Abdullah al-Harari accuses Wahhabis of falling into anthropomorphic descriptions of God and imitating polytheists.

===== United States =====
The Sufi Islamic Supreme Council of America founded by the Naqshbandi Sufi Shaykh Hisham Kabbani condemn Wahhabism as "extremist" and "heretical"; accusing it of being a terrorist ideology that labels other Muslims, especially Sufis as polytheists, a practice known as takfir.

=== Non-religious motivations ===
According to French Political Scientist Gilles Kepel, the alliance between Ibn 'Abd-al Wahhab and the tribal chief Muhammad ibn Saud to wage jihad on neighboring allegedly ignorant Muslims, was a "consecration" by Ibn 'Abd al-Wahhab since he renamed the Saudi tribe's long-standing raids as Jihad. Part of the Najd's "Hobbesian state of perpetual war pitted Bedouin tribes against one another for control of the scarce resources that could stave off starvation." And a case of substituting fath, "the 'opening' or conquest of a vast territory through religious zeal", for the "instinctive fight for survival and appetite for lucre".

=== Support ===
Pakistani poet Muhammad Iqbal praised the movement as an influential endeavour of Islamic Golden Age that campaigned to put an end to the general stagnation of Muslims, while saying that:

The essential thing to note is the spirit of freedom manifested in it, though inwardly this movement, too, is conservative in its own fashion. While it rises in revolt against the finality of the schools, and vigorously asserts the right of private judgement, its vision of the past is wholly uncritical, and in matters of law it mainly falls back on the traditions of the Prophet.

Salafi scholar Bilal Philips asserted that the charge of "Wahhabi" was deployed by the proponents of Madh'hab fanaticism during the nineteenth and twentieth centuries to Takfir (excommunicate) the legal non-conformists. According to Philips:

It is interesting to note that separate places of prayer for each of the Madh-habs remained around the Ka'bah until the first quarter of the twentieth century when 'Abdul-'Azeez ibn Sa'oud and his army conquered Makkah (October 1924) and united all worshippers behind a single Imaam regardless of his or their Madh-habs

Syrian-Egyptian Islamic revivalist scholar Muhammad Rashid Rida was one of the most influential supporters of the Wahhabi movement during the 20th century. Rida had developed favourable views towards the Wahhabis as early as his arrival in Egypt during the 1890s; after reading about the movement in the histories of Al-Jabartī and Al-Nāṣiri. Rida asserted that the social and military expansion of the Wahhabi movement could successfully launch an authentic Islamic revival throughout the Islamic World. Rida believed that the decline of Muslims was a result of the stagnation caused by the excesses of Sufism; which had distorted the pristine message of Islam. As a leading figure of the Salafiyya movement, Rida launched his project of re-habilitating Wahhabism and would popularise Najdi scholarly treatises across the Muslim World through his Al-Manar printing press.

Sukarno, the first president of Indonesia, had openly expressed his view in his book Dibawah bendera revolusi, that the progressive Tajdid movement by Wahhabis was essentially a positive influence on Islam globally, particularly in developing nations struggling to gain independence. Sukarno also appreciated the "wisdom of Ibn Saud to support Wahhabi scholars in their effort to reject various one thousand one kind of Bidʻah". It is argued by some that Sukarno was also influenced by Islamist figures such as Ahmad Khatib al-Minangkabawi, Agus Salim, and particularly Hamka, his elementary teacher.

According to notable Arab Linguist Taha Hussein (1889–1973 CE), the Wahhabi movement was new, yet simultaneously old. Although it was novel for its contemporary generations, it was also ancient in its powerful calls for return to a pure Islam untainted by the impurities of Shirk (polytheism). Acclaiming its role in the Arab Awakening and intellectual renewal, Taha Hussein states:

Muhammad Ibn Abdul Wahhab admonished the people of Najd for reverting to the ways of ignorance in creed and practice.... [I]t was hoped, this madhhab would have united the Arabs in the twelfth and thirteenth centuries (AH), just as the appearance of Islam united them in the first century (AH). What we need to emphasize regarding this madhhab is its impact on the intellectual and literary life among Arabs, which was great and profound in various ways. It awakened the Arab soul and placed in front of it, a higher example which it loved, and as a consequence, strived in its cause with the sword, the pen and other weapons. It again directed the attention of all Muslims, especially people of Iraq, Ash-Sham and Egypt, towards the Arabian Peninsula.

== See also ==
- Ahl-i Hadith
- Islah
- Salafiyya
- Decline and modernization of the Ottoman Empire
- Destruction of early Islamic heritage sites in Saudi Arabia
- International propagation of Salafism and Wahhabism
- Islamic schools and branches
- Muslim World League
- Ottoman–Wahhabi War
- Petro-Islam
- Quran
- Schools of Islamic theology
- Shia–Sunni relations
- Sufi–Salafi relations
- Aqidah
- Memoirs of Mr. Hempher, The British Spy to the Middle East

== Bibliography ==
- Ali, Mohamed Bin (2015). Roots Of Religious Extremism, The: Understanding The Salafi Doctrine Of Al-wala' Wal Bara'. World Scientific Publishing Company. ISBN 9781783263943.
- Gaye, Abdoul Aziz (2021). "The Violent Wahhabism and the Use of Islamic Texts to Justify Armed Violence Against Muslims and Non-Muslims". In Donlin-Smith, Thomas; Shafiq, Muhammad (eds.). The (De)Legitimization of Violence in Sacred and Human Contexts. Basingstoke: Palgrave Macmillan. doi:10.1007/978-3-030-51125-8. ISBN 978-3-030-51124-1. S2CID 241136571.
- Reem, Abu (1 April 2007). "The Wahhabi Myth: Debunking the Bogeyman". Muslim Matters. Archived from the original on 29 November 2020.
- Mouline, Nabil (2014). "Introduction: The Ulema, Clerics of Islam". The Clerics of Islam: Religious Authority and Political Power in Saudi Arabia. London: Yale University Press. ISBN 978-0-300-17890-6.
- Algar, Hamid (2002). Wahhabism: A Critical Essay. Oneonta, New York: Islamic Publications International. ISBN 188999913X.
- Brown, Daniel W. (2009). "The Wahhābī Movement". A New Introduction to Islam. Chichester, West Sussex: Wiley-Blackwell. pp. 245–247. ISBN 9781405158077.
- Commins, David (2006). The Wahhabi Mission and Saudi Arabia (PDF). I. B. Tauris. ISBN 9781845110802. Archived (PDF) from the original on 15 April 2021.
- Commins, David (2009). The Wahhabi Mission and Saudi Arabia. I.B. Tauris.
- DeLong-Bas, Natana J. (2004). Wahhabi Islam: From Revival and Reform to Global Jihad. New York: Oxford University Press. ISBN 0195169913.
- DeLong-Bas, Natana J. (2007). Wahhabi Islam: From Revival and Reform to Global Jihad. I.B. Tauris. ISBN 9781845113223.
- Esposito, John, ed. (2003). The Oxford Dictionary of Islam. Oxford University Press. doi:10.1093/acref/9780195125580.001.0001. ISBN 0195125584.
- Esposito, John L. (2011). What Everyone Needs to Know About Islam (2nd ed.). Oxford University Press. ISBN 9780199794133.
- Haddad, Gibril F. (2004). Al-Albani and Friends: A Concise Guide to the Salafi Movement. AQSA Publications.
- Halverson, Jeffry R. (2010). Theology and Creed in Sunni Islam: The Muslim Brotherhood, Ash'arism, and Political Sunnism. Palgrave Macmillan. ISBN 9780230106581.
- Haykel, Bernard (2013). "Ibn ‛Abd al-Wahhab, Muhammad (1703–92)". In Böwering, Gerhard; Crone, Patricia; Kadi, Wadad; Mirza, Mahan; Stewart, Devin J.; Zaman, Muhammad Qasim (eds.). The Princeton Encyclopedia of Islamic Political Thought. Princeton University Press. pp. 231–232. ISBN 9780691134840.
- Kepel, Gilles (2002). Jihad: The Trail of Political Islam. Translated by Anthony F. Roberts (1st English ed.). Cambridge, Massachusetts: Harvard University Press. ISBN 0674008774.
- Kepel, Gilles (2004). The War for Muslim Minds: Islam and the West. Harvard University Press. ISBN 9780674015753.
- Kepel, Gilles (2006). Jihad: The Trail of Political Islam. Translated by Anthony F. Roberts (New ed.). I.B. Tauris. ISBN 9781845112578.
- Lacey, Robert (1981). The Kingdom: Arabia and the House of Sa'ud. New York and London: Harcourt Brace Javonoich.
- Lacey, Robert (2009). Inside the Kingdom: Kings, Clerics, Modernists, Terrorists, and the Struggle for Saudi Arabia. Viking. ISBN 9780670021185.
- Lacroix, Stéphane (2013). "2: Between Revolution and Apoliticism: Nasir al-Din al-Albani and his Impact on the Shaping of Contemporary Salafism". In Meijer, Roel (ed.). Global Salafism: Islam's New Religious Movement. Oxford University Press. ISBN 9780199333431. OCLC 5713616619.
- M. Zarabozo, Jamaal al-Din (2005). The Life, Teachings and Influence of Muhammad ibn Abdul-Wahhaab. Riyadh: The Ministry of Islamic Affairs, Endowments, Dawah and Guidance; Kingdom of Saudi Arabia. ISBN 9960295001.
- Valentine, Simon Ross (2015). Force and Fanaticism: Wahhabism in Saudi Arabia and Beyond. London: C. Hurst & Co. ISBN 9781849044646.
- Wiktorowicz, Quintan (2006). "Anatomy of the Salafi Movement". Studies in Conflict & Terrorism. 29 (3): 207–239. doi:10.1080/10576100500497004. S2CID 20873920.
- Bonacina, Giovanni (2015). "1: A Deistic Revolution in Arabia". The Wahhabis Seen through European Eyes (1772–1830): Deists and Puritans of Islam. Leiden: Brill. ISBN 9789004293014.
- Coller, Ian (2022). Muslims and Citizens: Islam, Politics, and the French Revolution. New Haven, Connecticut: Yale University Press. ISBN 9780300243369.
- Bayley, C. A. (2010). "1: The 'Revolutionary Age' in the Wider World, c. 1790–1830". In Bessel, Richard; Guyatt, Nicholas; Rendall, Jane (eds.). War, Empire and Slavery, 1770–1830. New York: Palgrave Macmillan. ISBN 9780230282698.
