= The People of Monotheism =

Translation of several Arabic terms

The People of Monotheism may translate several Arabic terms:

- Ahl al-Tawḥīd (Arabic: أهل التوحيد), a name the Druze use for themselves. Literally, "The People of the Unity" or "The Unitarians", from tawḥid, unity (of God).
- al-Muwaḥḥidun (Arabic: الموحدون) is an Arabic term meaning "the monotheists". It has currency as:
  - the Arabic name of the Almohads.
  - the term used by the early followers of the 18th-century Arabian Muwahhidun movement of the reformer Muhammad ibn Abd al-Wahhab to describe themselves
  - a term that adherents of Salafism use to describe themselves.
  - a term that the Druze use to describe themselves.
  - a term that the Alawites use to describe themselves.
- Ahl al-ʿAdl wa t-Tawḥīd, "The People of Justice and Monotheism", a term used by the Mu'tazilis to describe themselves.

== See also ==
- Monotheism
- Unitarianism
