= Diriyah pact =

Treaty Between Muhammad Ibn Abdul Wahab and Muhammab Ibn Saud

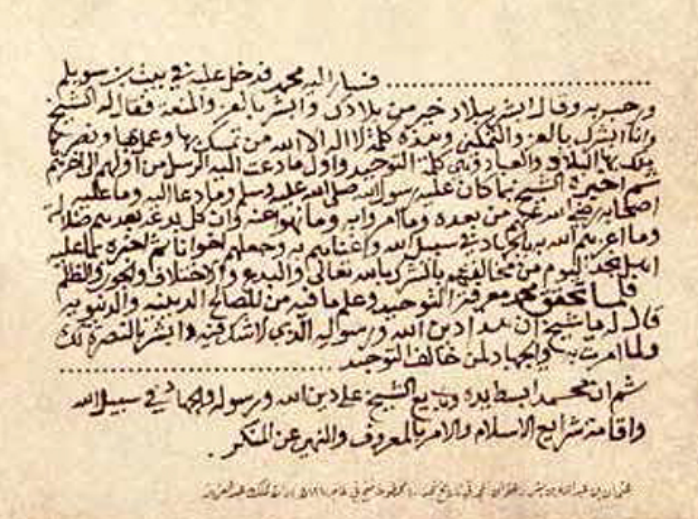
- Location: Diriyah (modern-day Riyadh)
- Effective: 1744
- Signatories: Muhammad Ibn Saud; Muhammad Ibn Abdul-Wahhab
- Language: Arabic

The Diriyah pact was an agreement signed between the Emir of Diriyah, Muhammad bin Saud, and Muhammad bin Abdul-Wahhab in the year 1744. The two imams agreed to call for correcting the people's faith from the polytheism, heresies, and superstitions attached to it, by returning to what Muhammad was upon, and carrying out the duty of enjoining what is right and forbidding what is wrong. After the pact, the reform movement began its work, and the Salafist call spread and became widely influential with supporters throughout the Arabian Peninsula and outside it. The pact is considered the basis on which the modern Saudi state was established.

== History ==
When the call of Muhammad bin Abdul-Wahhab began to spread to combat the heresies and superstitions that were widespread at that time in Najd in particular and the Arabian Peninsula in general, the call was subjected to harassment in attempts by some to get rid of Muhammad bin Abdul-Wahhab, and when he felt this, he decided to move from his hometown of Uyayna to Diriyah. Most of the rulers of the region were afraid to embrace this call, for fear of those who might confront him, especially since there were many who did not see any violation in the innovations and superstitions that Muhammad bin Abdul Wahhab was fighting.

At this time, Muhammad bin Saud bin Muhammad bin Muqrin was ruler of Diriyah, and he was very influential and had a position among the people of Diriyah, in addition to being a feared ruler. Diriyah was also a fortified and honest city, and Diriyah was a town in which legal violations and heresies had not spread among its people. For this reason, the general atmosphere in the town became good and conducive to receiving the call of Ibn Abdul-Wahhab, who began spreading it in the region and calling for its followers. When Muhammad bin Abdul-Wahhab arrived in Diriyah, Muhammad bin Saud walked to him in Ibn Suwailem's house and welcomed him, saying: “I give you good tidings of a country better than yours, and I give good tidings of glory and power.” Ibn Abdul-Wahhab said: “And I give you good tidings of glory and empowerment, and this is the word ‘There is no god but God, whoever adheres to it, acts upon it, and supports it, will rule the countries and the people with it. It is the word of monotheism, and the first thing the messengers called for, from the first to the last.” The sources do not mention a specific date for this meeting, but it was shortly after the arrival of Muhammad bin Abdul-Wahhab to Diriyah.

Muhammad bin Saud feared two things if he supported Ibn Abdul-Wahhab's call. First: that the sheikh would abandon him to another place and replace him with someone else. Second: that the sheikh would stand up to the money he took from the people of Diriyah. Therefore, Ibn Saud wanted there to be a covenant and covenant between him and the caller. He said to him: “O Sheikh, this is the religion of God and His Messenger about which there is no doubt, and I give good tidings of support for you and for what you have been commanded to do and jihad for those who violate monotheism, but I want to impose two conditions on you: The first: If we support you and jihad for the sake of God, God will open the countries for us and for you.” I am afraid that you will leave us and replace us with others. Second: I have a law regarding Diriyah (that is, what the weak give to the strong to protect and defend it) that I take from them at the time of fruition, and I am afraid that you will say, “Do not take anything from them.” The sheikh replied: “O prince, as for the first, spread your hand, blood for blood, and demolition for demolition, and as for the second, perhaps God will open conquests for you, and God will compensate you from the spoils with what is better than them.” Then Muhammad bin Saud extended his hand and pledged allegiance to Muhammad bin Abdul Wahhab on supporting the religion of God and His Messenger, jihad for the sake of God, establishing the laws of Islam, and enjoining good and forbidding evil.

Historian Hussein bin Ghannam says: “The sheikh remained in control of making and contracting, taking and giving, presenting and delaying, and he did not ride an army and no opinion was issued by Muhammad bin Saud or his son Abdulaziz, except from his words and opinions. When God conquered Riyadh and the area of Islam expanded, the paths were secure, and every difficult person was saved from present and past, the Sheikh placed the matter in the hands of Abdulaziz bin Muhammad bin Saud and delegated the affairs of the Muslims and the treasury to him. Diriyah became a center for spreading the reformist call of Muhammad bin Abdul-Wahhab, and students of religion flocked to it, who later became supporters of the call and the state, and the sheikh began sending his messages to the princes of neighboring countries and tribal leaders, informing them of what he called for in terms of reviving religion and combating heresies.

== Formal pact ==
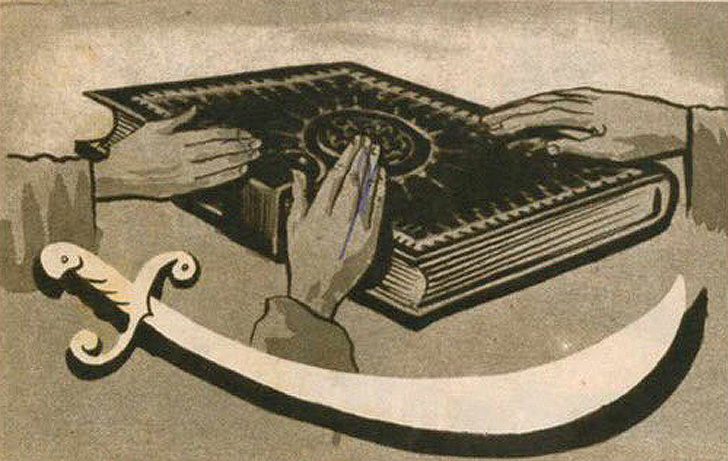
A 20th century illustration of the Diriyah pact

Fahd Al-Hawas, Director of the Department of Antiquities in Old Diriyah, says: “When the great religious reformer Sheikh Muhammad bin Abdul Wahhab came to Diriyah in the year 1745, and he met its then prince, Muhammad bin Saud, who ruled Diriyah for forty years from 1725 to 1765, including 20 years before meeting Sheikh Muhammad bin Abdul-Wahhab, and they agreed on the Diriyah pact, which stipulated jihad for the sake of God, upholding the word of monotheism, enjoining good and forbidding evil, and fighting heresies and superstitions. Imam Muhammad bin Saud pledged to protect and defend this call. With this historical pact, Diriyah, an Arab Islamic capital emerged there, extending its influence over most of the Arabian Peninsula.

Abdul Rahman Al Abdul Latif, Deputy Governor of Diriyah, says: “Historians have determined the date on which the agreement was reached between Imam Muhammad bin Saud and Sheikh Muhammad bin Abdul Wahhab, which is the beginning of the establishment of the first Saudi state in the year 1745, because at that time there was no government with systems in Najd. There were clear laws or legislation that took care of the interests of the people and protected them from chaos and instability. There were sheikhs, tribes, and notables from countries, each working within his circle according to his interests. Among these emirates was the emirate of Al Saud in Diriyah, the emirate of Al Muammar in Al Uyaynah, the emirate of Daham bin Dawas in Riyadh, and the emirate of Bani Khalid in Al-Ahsa.

Abdullah bin Muhammad bin Khamis says in his book Al-Diriyah: “The first Saudi state was led by Imam Muhammad bin Saud bin Muhammad bin Muqrin bin Markhan bin Ibrahim bin Musa bin Rabi’ah bin Mani’, who was born in Al-Diriyah in approximately the year 1100 AH, according to what was stated in the book Al-Diriyah, and he took over its emirate in the year 1139 AH, and he died, may God have mercy on him, in the year 1179 AH. He ruled for 40 years, including 20 years after Sheikh Muhammad bin Abdul Wahhab left for Diriyah, and he was the first to support the Salafist call.

== Effect ==
Muhammad bin Abdul Wahhab began to spread his call at the level of Diriyah and among its circles, and there were dhikr and teaching circles, and the signs of a scientific and intellectual movement began to fill the Diriyah community, and it soon spread beyond its borders and countrysides to other countries. The rulers neighboring Diriyah realized that the authority they enjoyed was threatened, and the morale enjoyed by the scholars was on the way to decline, and hostility began to appear between the two parties and there was linguistic resistance, and Ibn Abdul Wahhab met this hostility with kindness and leniency, and he followed this path as long as he found a way to do so, and if This method was not successful. He used the path of jihad as long as he drew a weapon in his face and his opponents became hostile to him, the method of Islam and its approach to that.

The call of Muhammad bin Abdul Wahhab began its process to cover the entire Arabian Peninsula and from there to all countries of the Islamic world, with supporters and helpers. The summary of Ibn Abd al-Wahhab's call, which he sought to spread, was to return Muslims to what the nation's predecessors were at the beginning of Islam, during the era of the Rightly Guided Caliphs, a pure return free from heresies and superstitions, and to adopt the clear text and the correct transmission, represented by the authentic narrations that do not differ from what is clear and reasonable. Just as the rulers and scholars who lived in Diriyah became ill at the beginning of the era of Ibn Abd al-Wahhab's mission, and their hostility faded away and they disappeared, so also the scholars on the outskirts of the Arabian Peninsula and outside it became evil, and they developed hostility toward it and declared a relentless war against it.

The Battle of Riyadh was the first battle that Muhammad bin Saud fought in order to support the reformist call and subjugate its people. The battles between Diriyah, the seat of the first Saudi state, and Dham bin Dawas, the ruler of Riyadh, continued for more than three years. Years, and the situation continued until the year 1773, when Abdul Aziz bin Muhammad bin Saud marched at the head of a large campaign and attacked Riyadh and seized it after twenty-seven years. The first to respond to Ibn Abd al-Wahhab's call was the town of Huraymila in the year 1754, then Al-Quwayyah in the year 1755, then Al-Washam, Sudair, Thadiq, Al-Hutah, and a number of regions of the Arabian Peninsula. Diriyah has become a hub for Ulema, as it has become the destination for Muslim pupils on their academic journeys because it represented a prestigious Islamic center, especially after Muhammad bin Abdul-Wahhab sat in his mosque, which was crowded with Muslim pupils.
