= Wahhabi (epithet) =

Derogatory term directed at a wide range of Muslim movements

The term Wahhabi (Arabic: وهابي, romanized: Wahhābī) has been deployed by external observers as a pejorative epithet to label a wide range of religious, social and political movements across the Muslim world since the 18th century. Initially, the term Wahhabiyya was employed by the opponents of the religious reformist movement initiated by Muhammad ibn Abd al-Wahhab (d. 1792 CE / 1206 AH) in the Arabian Peninsula and continued by his successors. The term was derived from his father's name, Abd al-Wahhab, and widely employed by rivals to denounce his movement. Ibn Abd al-Wahhab and his disciples did not use the terminology and identified themselves as Muwahiddun. However, later scholars associated with the movement such as Ibn Baz and Salih al-Fawzan later appropriated the term Wahhabi and considered it an honorific title.

During the 19th century, the term was applied by colonial authorities in British India to Islamic religious movements perceived as a threat to their imperial interests, such as the Tariqat e-Muhammadiyah movement led by Syed Ahmad Barelvi. The usage of the term by British officials led to a backlash from Indian Muslims and it was banned from being used in official discourse by 1889. During the 20th century, several authoritarian states, particularly in the post-Soviet sphere, have incorporated the Wahhabi epithet into Islamophobic and nativist propaganda discourses, depicting dissidents of Muslim background as subversives and "traitors" to the nation. During the post-9/11 era, the strategy was amplified by various dictators, who launched crackdowns upon public expressions of religiosity by portraying such campaigns as a defense of modern "Enlightenment" ideas. Victims of these campaigns include practising Muslims who pray in mosques, have beards or assist Islamic educational institutions; who are portrayed by authoritarian regimes as opponents of modernity and dehumanised in state propaganda through Islamphobic stereotypes.

== Etymology ==
The Arabic term Wahhabi translates in English to "of Wahhab", meaning "the Bestower", which is one of the names of God in Islam. The term Wahhabi was initially applied to the reformist Muwahiddun movement of Muhammad ibn Abd al-Wahhab.

== Historical usage ==
The term Wahhabi is used to label a wide range of religious, social and political movements across the Muslim world, ever since the 18th century. Initially, the term Wahhabiyya was employed by the political opponents of the religious reform movement initiated by Muhammad ibn Abd al-Wahhab (d. 1792 CE / 1206 AH) in the Arabian Peninsula and continued by his successors. The term was derived from his father's name, Abd al-Wahhab and widely employed by rivals to denounce his movement. The designation Wahhabi for this movement was likely first used by Sulayman ibn Abd al-Wahhab, an ardent critic of his brother's views, who used the term in his purported treatise Fasl al-Khitab fi al-Radd ala Muhammad ibn Abd al-Wahhab. Meanwhile, Ibn Abd al-Wahhab and his disciples did not use the terminology and identified themselves as Muwahiddun. Various scholars have described the epithet Wahhabi as part of a "Rhetoric of Fear" to suppress alternate social, political and religious voices by ruling authorities.

=== British India ===
Although the word Wahabi is a misnomer.. The insistence of the English as also some Indian writers on the use of this appellation seems to be deliberate and actuated by ulterior motives... In the eyes of the British Government the word Wahabi was synonymous with 'traitor' and 'rebel'. Thus, by describing the followers of Sayyid Ahmad as Wahabis, the contemporary Government officers aimed at killing two birds with one stone-branding them as rebels in the eyes of the higher circles of the government and as 'extremists' and 'desecrators of shrines' in the eyes of the general Muslims. The epithet became a term of religio-political abuse.

— Historian Qeyamuddin Ahmad

During the colonial era, various European travellers began using the term Wahhabi to denote a wide swathe of Islamic reform and political movements they witnessed across the Muslim World. Hanafi scholar Fazl-e Haq Khairabadi, the fiercest opponent of Shah Ismail Dehlvi (d. 1831 CE / 1246 AH) was the first major figure in South Asia to charge the socio-political Jihad movement of Sayyid Ahmad Shahid (d. 1831 CE / 1246 AH) and Shah Ismail with "Wahhabism". Noting the shared Hejazi teachers of Islamic reformer Shah Waliullah Dehlawi (d. 1762 CE / 1176 AH) — the grandfather of Shah Ismail — with Muhammad ibn Abd al-Wahhab; the British colonial administration charged Shah Waliullah's followers with "Wahhabism". After Sayyid Ahmad's death, his followers were labelled as "Wahhabis", accusing them of pan-Islamic rebellions and were tried by colonial authorities in what became known as "The Great Wahhabi Trials". Concomitantly, the disciples of Sayyid Ahmad rejected this term and identified themselves as Ahl-i Hadith (People of Hadith) or Tariqa-i Muhammadiyya (Path of Muhammad). Prominent figures of the Ahl-i Hadith and Deobandi schools tried by the British include Siddiq Hasan Khan (d. 1890 CE / 1307 AH), Muhammad Qasim Nanawtawi (d. 1880 CE / 1297 AH) etc. Decrying the chaotic state of affairs, prominent 19th century Indian modernist scholar Sayyid Ahmad Khan (1817-1898) stated:

"he who follows the sunnat [the teachings and practices of Muhammad] is called a Wahhabi and he who practices bid'at [heretical innovations] is called wali [holy man]"

Islamic scholar Siddiq Hassan Khan publicly challenged the rationale behind the British usage of the term Wahhabi and would compile several treatises rebuking its usage. Another influential Ahl-i Hadith scholar Muhammad Husayn Batalwi (d. 1920 CE / 1338 AH) launched a popular protest campaign during the 1880s demanding the British administration ban the official usage of the word Wahhabi. In 1887, the Punjab provincial administration acceded to the campaign demands and by 1889, the movement was successful in procuring its demands throughout all the British Indian Provinces. Although the term Wahhabi would be censured in official documents, its usage continues in intra-religious discourse to the present day. Very often the Ahl-i Hadith, Deobandi and modernist movements were subjected to takfir (excommunication) by rival sects; under the charge of "Wahhabism".

== Contemporary usage ==
=== Russia ===
==== Late Soviet Era ====
During the Soviet era, religious freedoms of Muslims were suppressed by the Soviet state through various anti-religious campaigns, which were part of its Marxist-Leninist social programme. State atheist propaganda stirred up Islamophobic hysteria to persecute Muslims by regularly alleging the existence of pan-Islamist plots to overthrow the communist order through underground activities. The terms "Sufism" and "fanatic" were deployed as the boogeyman in Soviet propaganda while implementing the Soviet anti-Islam campaigns, particularly during the era of stagnation. Anti-"Wahhabi" discourse of KGB had appeared as early as 1970s, in co-ordination with the Soviet approved clerics of SADUM, repressing many indigenous Sufi reformers and political dissidents. Saudi-Soviet relations were poor, and the Kremlin had regarded Saudi government as "reactionary". However, during the perestroika period, a significant shift emerged in the propaganda depictions. Replacing "Sufi" and "fanatic", KGB began directly borrowing the British colonial-era discourse on "Wahhabism" and Western terminology on "fundamentalism" respectively; to stereotype an alleged phenomenon labelled in state propaganda as "Islamic menace". Anti-Islam stereotypes of the cultures of Muslim countries were regularly featured in Soviet media throughout the 1980s, which discouraged Muslims living within Soviet Union from having religious contacts with the Muslim World.

"The use of “Wahhabi” for people within the former Soviet Union increased as the old order crumbled but people who had achieved a privileged position under it wanted to preserve their advantages. Among the early popularizers of the term were men who had comprised the “official clergy” of Islam (that is, the small proportion of religious functionaries who were allowed to operate legally under the control of administrative bodies subject to the Soviet regime) and who largely remained in office in the post-Soviet era. They found “Wahhabi” a convenient label to denigrate anyone who criticized them. The process began even before the demise of the Soviet Union. For example, a late-Soviet-era official, U.A. Rustamov, who oversaw Uzbekistan for the Council on Religious Affairs of the USSR’s Council of Ministers applied the term to people who faulted the “official clergy” for caring too little about the meaning of religious ceremonies to Muslims.

In political, as well as religious matters, any Muslim who challenges the status quo is at risk of being labeled a Wahhabi. This is how the KGB and its post-Soviet successors have used the term. In fact, the KGB may have played a large role in promoting its use."

— Historian Muriel Atkin on Russian media deployment of "Wahhabi" epithet during 1990s

==== Post Soviet Era ====
By 1990s, in post-Soviet Russian media, the label Wahhabi had become the most common term to refer to the erstwhile Soviet notions of so-called "Islamic Menace"; while "Sufism" was portrayed by the new government as a "moderate" force that countered the alleged "radicalism" of Muslim dissidents. Despite the improvement of Russia–Saudi Arabia relations, conspiratorial rhetoric linking pan-Islamists in Central Asia and Caucasus with Saudi Arabia continued to persist. Former CPSU elites as well as Russian ultra-nationalists regularly used the label to stir up anti-Muslim hysteria against the revival of Islamic religiosity in Central Asia, Caucasus and various regions of Russian Federation.

Russian government also deployed the epithet to attack political opponents and independence movements in Muslim-majority regions of Chechnya, Dagestan, Tatarstan, etc. The BBC News reported in 2001:

"The term "Wahhabi" is often used very freely. The Russian media, for example, use it as a term of abuse for Muslim activists in Central Asia and the Caucasus, as well as in Russia itself.."

In contemporary Russia, the term "Wahhabism" is often used to denote any manifestation of what the government depicts as "non-traditional" forms of Islam. Some Russian policymakers characterise "Wahhabism" as a "sectarian heresy" that is alien to Islam in Russia. Other Russian intellectuals adopted an approach of differentiating between the Wahhabi movement of Saudi Arabia, which was characterised as "traditional", while its manifestation in foreign countries began to be termed "non-traditional". The latter approach came to be prescribed in the official Russian religious policy. In various provinces, "Wahhabism" would be banned by law. Revealing the government policy, Russian president Vladimir Putin stated in 2008: "Wahhabism in its original form is a normal tendency within Islam and there is nothing terrible in it. But there are extremist tendencies within Wahhabism itself".

Scholars have compared government fabrications of Wahhabi conspiracies to the anti-semitic tropes propagated during the era of Imperial Russia. Various Russian academics have challenged the usage of the term as a "catch-all phrase" to characterize trends that depart from "normative Islam" and warn of the disfiguring inferences of such an approach. These include Professor Vitaly Naumkin, Director of Islamic Studies Centre at the Russian Academy of Sciences, and author Aleksei Malashenko, who assert that:

- Wahhabi movement of Ibn Abd al-Wahhab was only one of the various Salafi movements and has different strands within itself
- Using the term "Wahhabism" suggests a monopolistic mentality that distinguishes between "true Islam" and a wrong version, eroding the ability to envision "religious pluralism". This may also result in radicalisation of neo-traditionalist establishment which becomes hostile to Salafis, reformists and various Muslim groups they deem heterodox
- The term is often used in an abusive manner and has become increasingly used as a politically correct label to censure any political rivals. Oftentimes, many apolitical Muslims are the first victims of anti-Wahhabi campaigns

=== Central Asia ===
Across Central Asia, authoritarian governments conceptualise "Wahhabism" to label various Islamic revivalist, social and political opposition movements and group them alongside militant Islamists. The political classes widely deploy the usage of the term "Wahhabism" to suppress any unauthorised religious activity. As a result, Sufi reformers, modernist intellectuals and various political activists have been targeted under the charge of "Wahhabism". Oftentimes, Iran-inspired shi'ite activists are also labelled "Wahhabi". The official political discourse borrows tags like "fundamentalist", "Wahhabi", etc. to denote what the government considers to be the "wrong type of Islam". Numerous arbitrary arrests, detentions, torture and other repressive measures are meted out to those charged with these labels. In 1998, loudspeakers in Uzbek Mosques were banned, alleging that it was a "Wahhabi" practice.

Russian media assertions have portrayed a spectre of "Wahhabi revolutions" in Central Asia backed by pan-Islamic organizations, supposedly assisted financially by anonymous religious charities from the Gulf, as an existential threat to the stability of post-Soviet order. Central Asian autocrats have eagerly embraced such narratives, and deploy them to launch crackdowns on revival of Islamic religiosity and arrest various dissidents. Modernist intellectuals critical of ruling governments have been routinely targeted by state media, charging them with "Wahhabi" sympathies. During the Tajik civil war, government propaganda and Russian mass media deployed the canard fervently against the United Tajik Opposition, a diverse coalition of democrats, Islamists and nationalists, portraying them as a threat to the post-Soviet order. In 1997, former Kyrgyz PM Felix Kulov accused Iran of supporting "Wahhabi emissaries" all across Central Asia, although Khomeinist ideology considered Wahhabis of Arabia to be "heretics".

Uzbekistan's post-communist autocrat Karimov was a major proponent of the boogeyman theory, evoking the existence of what he described as a "Wahhabi menace" through state propaganda and in meetings with other foreign officials. Several anti-religious campaigns has been launched by the Uzbek government in the name of combating "Wahhabism"; through which numerous individuals charged with "treason" and "subversion" get arrested and tortured.

Describing the repressive nature of these campaigns, a Human Rights Watch report stated:

"a government policy of intolerance toward what it perceives as the primary threat to state stability - Muslims whom the government generally refers to as "Wahhabis" - makes a travesty of the government's assertion that the stability born of repression is necessary.. The human rights abuses committed during a crackdown in the Farghona Valley, an Islamic stronghold, that began intensively in early December 1997 are a natural outgrowth of the government's unchecked repression of what can loosely be referred to as "independent" Muslims.. Most victims appear to have been practicing Muslims whom the government and local authorities commonly refer to as "Wahhabis." Police were able to identify these men because.. they were known in their neighborhood to attend mosques.., or to support an Islamic school, or to wear a beard, often considered a sign of piety.. several local businessmen with no apparent affiliation with Islam were detained under threat of serious criminal charges in order to extort ransom money from their relatives.. the government made it plain that it was looking for "Wahhabis," explicitly defining the link between government repression and intolerance toward individuals of a certain religious faith... Human Rights Watch has received numerous reports.. of police and security agents forcing individuals to shave off their beard"

— HRW report on 1997-98 anti-"Wahhabi" crackdowns of Uzbek government in Fergana Valley,

=== Iran ===
The curriculum of seminaries controlled by Khomeinists in Iran are known for their sectarian attacks against Sunni Islam, and clerics of these seminaries often portray Sunnis as "Wahhabis" in their rhetoric. The Sahaba (companions of the Prophet) and other revered figures in Sunni history like Abu Hanifa, Abd al-Qadir al-Jilani, etc. are regularly slandered as "Wahhabis" in these seminaries.

=== Saudi Arabia ===
Western usage of the term of "Wahhabism" to describe religious culture of the Saudi Arabian society has been officially rejected by the Saudi government. During a 2008 conversation with Saudi Arabian King Salman ibn Abd al-Aziz (then governor of Riyadh Province), Egyptian-American scientist Ahmed Zewail discussed the usage of "Wahhabism" by segments of Western media. King Salman replied:

"there is no such thing as Wahhabism. They attack us using this term. We are Sunni Muslims who respect the four schools of thought. We follow Islam's Prophet (Muhammad, peace be upon him), and not anyone else.... Imam Muhammad bin Abdel-Wahab was a prominent jurist and a man of knowledge, but he did not introduce anything new. The first Saudi state did not establish a new school of thought... The Islamic thought, which rules in Saudi Arabia, stands against extremism.... We have grown tired of being described as Wahhabis. This is incorrect and unacceptable."

In an interview given to American journalist Jeffrey Goldberg in 2018, Saudi Arabian Crown Prince Mohammed bin Salman denied the existence of "Wahhabism" in his country and asserted that the Western usage of the term itself has been a misnomer. Stating that the terminology itself is indefinable, Mohammed bin Salman said: "When people speak of Wahhabism, they don’t know exactly what they are talking about."

=== Western usage ===
In the Western world, before the 2000s, the term "Wahhabism" was mainly used in academic, scholarly circles in the context of Ibn Abd al-Wahhab's Muwahhidun movement and its historical evolution in the Arabian Peninsula. During the post-9/11 era, the term came to be used for a wide range of Islamist movements in Western media depictions. American propaganda constantly depicted Taliban as a "Wahhabi" organization during the war in Afghanistan, despite Taliban belonging to the Deobandi tradition, a movement that emerged in Indian subcontinent during the 19th century and opposing British colonial rule there.

Several Western academics have strongly criticized these media depictions and stereotypes, asserting that such inaccurate portrayals have rendered the usage of term indefinable and meaningless. Blanket depictions made by some Western feminists who conflate misogynist and conservative socio-moral customs across the Arab world with "Wahhabism" have also been challenged by various scholars; noting that legal writings of Ibn Abd al-Wahhab revealed concern for female welfare and safeguarding their rights. Historian M. Reza Pirbhai has stated that since the 1990s, notions of a "Wahhabi conspiracy" have resurfaced in sections of the Western media, which deployed the term as a catch-all phrase to portray an organized and coordinated global network of ideological revolutionaries challenging the West. Pirbhai asserted that such media narratives are part of a propaganda campaign to facilitate the imperialist policies of the U.S. government.

The definition of "Wahhabism" itself has been a contested category in Western usage, with various journalists, authors, media outlets, politicians, religious leaders, etc. attaching contradictory meanings to it. Some scholars have asserted that the term itself has lost its "objective reality" in modern Western linguistics; due to the phenomenon of it being deployed in a wide variety of ways in different contexts and it being understood alternatively by various sections of the society, very often in stark contradiction with each other.

The label has also been used as a "catch-all phrase" to censor Muslim intellectuals, activists and political opponents through various repressive measures, such as forced disappearances and arbitrary detentions, by characterizing such liquidations as attempts to enforce "stability" and "national unity".

== Bibliography ==
- Ahmed, Qeyamuddin (2020). "Preface to the First Edition". The Wahhabi Movement in India (Second Revised ed.). Abingdon, Oxon: Routledge: Taylor and Francis Group. pp. ix, x. ISBN 978-0367514839.
- Alavi, Seema (2011). "Siddiq Hasan Khan (1832-90) and the Creation of a Muslim Cosmopolitanism in the 19th century". Journal of the Economic and Social History of the Orient. 54 (1). Koninklijke Brill NV, Leiden: Brill Publishers: 8–10. doi:10.1163/156852011X567373. JSTOR 41305791 – via JSTOR.
- Alavi, Seema (2015). "Chapter 5: Nawab Siddiq Hasan Khan and the Muslim Cosmopolis". Muslim Cosmopolitanism in the Age of Empire. Cambridge, Massachusetts, London, England: Harvard University Press. ISBN 978-0-674-73533-0.
- Atkin, Muriel (2000). "The Rhetoric of Islamophobia". CA&C Press. Archived from the original on 25 September 2021.
- Bearman, P. J.; Bianquis, T.H.; Bosworth, C.E.; van Donzel, E.; Heinrichs, W.P (2002). The Encyclopedia of Islam: New Edition Vol. XI. Koninklijke, Brill, Leiden, The Netherlands: Brill. ISBN 90-04-12756-9.
- Commins, David (2006). The Wahhabi Mission and Saudi Arabia. London: I.B Tauris. ISBN 1-84511-080-3.
- Esposito, John L. (2011). What Everyone Needs to Know About Islam (2nd ed.). New York; Oxford: Oxford University Press. ISBN 978-0199794133.
- Dannreuther, Roland; March, Luke (2010). Russia and Islam: State, society and radicalism. 2 Park Square, Milton Park, Abingdon, Oxon OX14 4RN: Routledge: Taylor & Francis. ISBN 978-0-415-55245-5.
- Davis, Rohan (2018). Western Imaginings: The Intellectual Contest to Define Wahhabism. Cairo, Egypt: The American University in Cairo Press. ISBN 978-977-416-864-2.
- Hardy, Roger (30 September 2001). "Analysis: Inside Wahhabi Islam". Archived from the original on 19 October 2002.
- Jalal, Ayesha (2008). Partisans of Allah: Jihad in South Asia. Princeton University Press. ISBN 978-0-674-02801-2.
- Khalid, Adeeb (2003). "Nation, State and Religion in Uzbekistan". International Journal of Middle East Studies. 35 (4). USA: Cambridge University Press: 573–598. doi:10.1017/S0020743803000242. JSTOR 3879864. S2CID 162710583 – via JSTOR.
- Gaye, Abdoul Aziz (2021). "The Violent Wahhabism and the Use of Islamic Texts to Justify Armed Violence Against Muslims and Non-Muslims". In Donlin-Smith, Thomas; Shafiq, Muhammad (eds.). The (De)Legitimization of Violence in Sacred and Human Contexts. Basingstoke: Palgrave Macmillan. doi:10.1007/978-3-030-51125-8. ISBN 978-3-030-51124-1. S2CID 241136571.
- Knysh, Alexander (2004). "A Clear and Present Danger: "Wahhabism" as a Rhetorical Foil". Die Welt des Islams. 44 (1). Brill: 3–26. JSTOR 1571334 – via JSTOR.
- Mandaville, Peter; Hammond, Andrew (2022). Wahhabism and the World: Understanding Saudi Arabia's Global Influence on Islam. New York: Oxford University Press. ISBN 978-0-19-753257-7.
- Metcalf, Barbara Daly (1982). Islamic Revival in British India: Deoband, 1860-1900. Princeton, New Jersey: Princeton University Press. ISBN 9780195660494.
- Metcalf, B.D. (2002). "Traditionalist' Islamic Activism:Deoband, Tablighis, and Talibs". International Institute for the Study of Islam in the Modern World: 6. hdl:1887/10068 – via Leiden University Scholarly Publications.
- Mouline, Nabil (2014). "Introduction: The Ulema, Clerics of Islam". The Clerics of Islam: Religious Authority and Political Power in Saudi Arabia. London: Yale University Press. ISBN 978-0-300-17890-6.
- Reem, Abu (1 April 2007). "The Wahhabi Myth: Debunking the Bogeyman". Muslim Matters. Archived from the original on 29 November 2020.
- Stephens, Julia (5 January 2009). "The "Great Wahabi Trial": The Legal Construction and Deconstruction of the Muslim Jihadi in British India, 1869–71". American Historical Association. Archived from the original on 5 October 2020.
- Stephens, Julia (January 2013). "The Phantom Wahhabi: Liberalism and the Muslim fanatic in mid-Victorian India". Modern Asian Studies. 47 (1): 26. doi:10.1017/S0026749X12000649. JSTOR 23359778. S2CID 145092951 – via JSTOR.
