= Muhammad Hayat al-Sindi =

Islamic scholar and Sufi (died 1750)

Personal life
- Born: Ghotki, Sindh, Mughal Empire
- Died: 3 February 1750 Hijaz, Jeddah Eyalet, Ottoman Empire
- Era: 18th century
- Region: present day Kufa

Religious life
- Religion: Islam
- Denomination: Sunni
- Jurisprudence: Hanafi or Hanbali
- Creed: Athari

Muslim leader
- Disciple of: Ibrahim al-Kurani
- Students: Muhammad ibn Ahmad ibn Salim al-Saffarīnī Muhammad b. Sadiq al-Sindi Muhammad Ibn 'Abd al-Wahhab Muhammad ibn Isma'il al- San'aani
- Influenced by: Ibn Taymiyya, Ibn Qayyim
- Influenced: Wahhabi, Ahl-i Hadith, Salafiyya and various Islamic Reform movements

Muhammad Hayat al-Sindi (Arabic: محمد حیات السندی; Sindhi: محمد حيات سنڌي; died 3 February 1750) was an Islamic scholar who lived during the period of the Ottoman Empire.

== Education and scholarship ==
Al-Sindhi was born into the Chachar tribe of Adilpur, Sindh (in modern-day Pakistan). His father was said to be a local noble of Bhakkar. Al-Sindi traveled locally to get his basic education. Then he migrated to Madinah and studied closely with Ibrahim al-Kurani and his son Muhammad Tahir al-Kurani. Here, he was initiated into the Naqshbandi tariqa.

=== Notable students ===
One of his students was Muhammad ibn Abd al-Wahhab, whom he met in 1136 Hijri. It was Abdullah ibn Ibrahim ibn Sayf who introduced him to Hayyat al-Sindhi. Al-Sindhi would make an immense influence on the theological formation of Muhammad ibn 'Abd al-Wahhab and his reformist views. Early Wahhabi chroniclers acclaimed al-Sindhi as “the spark that lighted ibn ʿAbdul Wahhab’s path." Muhammad ibn Ahmad ibn Salim al-Saffarīnī was also among his students.

== Views ==
Although trained in Hanafi law, he was also a scholar of the Hanbali school. Al-Sindhi was a major reviver of Hadith sciences during the 18th century. Throughout his treatises al-Sindhi stressed the obligation of upholding the practice of Ijtihad, condemned Taqlid, called for a revival of the doctrines of the Salaf al-Salih and championed the superiority of Hadiths over past juristic opinions. Al-Sindhi was also known for his strong critique of folk practices associated with cult of saints and veneration of shrines.

== See also ==
- Muhammad 'Abid al-Sindi
- List of Hanafis
- List of Sufis
- List of Muslim theologians
