= Al-Saffarini =

Islamic scholar

Sheikh Muḥammad ibn Aḥmad Saffārīnī
- محمد بن أحمد السفاريني

Personal life
- Born: Shams al-Din Abu al-Aun Muhammad bin Ahmad bin al-Saffarini شمس الدين أبو العون محمد بن أحمد السَّفّارِيني; 1701 Saffarin
- Died: 1774 (aged 72–73) Nablus
- Citizenship: Ottoman Empire
- Era: 18th century
- Region: Levant
- Occupation: Scholar of Islam

Religious life
- Religion: Islam
- Denomination: Sunni
- Jurisprudence: Hanbali
- Creed: Athari

Muḥammad ibn Aḥmad Saffārīnī al-Hanbali (1114 AH, 1702/3 CE, Saffarin, Tulkarm – 1188 AH, 1774 CE, Nablus) was a Levantine Hanbali cleric, jurist, muhaddith, writer and historian.

== Biography ==
His full name was Shams al-Din Abu al-Aun Muhammad bin Ahmad bin Salim bin Sulayman al-Saffarini al-Nablusi. He was born in Saffarin village of Tulkarm Governorate in 1114 AH / 1701 CE. He completed his education of Qur'an in the village. He studied under Muhammad Hayat al-Sindi. He also studied the book "Dalīl aṭ-Tālib li-Nail al-Maṭālib" of the author Mar'i al-Karmi.

== Works ==
He was the author of several books in many subjects such as Fiqh, Aqeedah and Tafsir including:

- Lawāmiʻ al-Anwār al-Bahīyah wa-Sawāṭiʻ al-Asrār al-Atharīyah
- Durrah al-Muḍīyah fi ʻAqd al-Firqah al-Mardīyah
- Sharh Thalathiyat Musnad al-Imam Ahmad
- Kashf al-Litham li Sharh Umdat al-Ahkam
- Natāʼij al-Afkār fī Sharḥ Ḥadīth Sayyid al-Istighfār
- Ghidha al-Albabi bi Sharh Mandhumatil Aadabi
- Al-Buhur az-Zakhiratu fi ‘Ulum al-Akhira
