= Muhammad ibn Abd al-Wahhab =

Saudi Arabian Islamic scholar, jurist, and eponym of Islam (1703–1792)

Imam Shaykh Muhammad ibn Abd al-Wahhab
- محمد بن عبد الوهاب
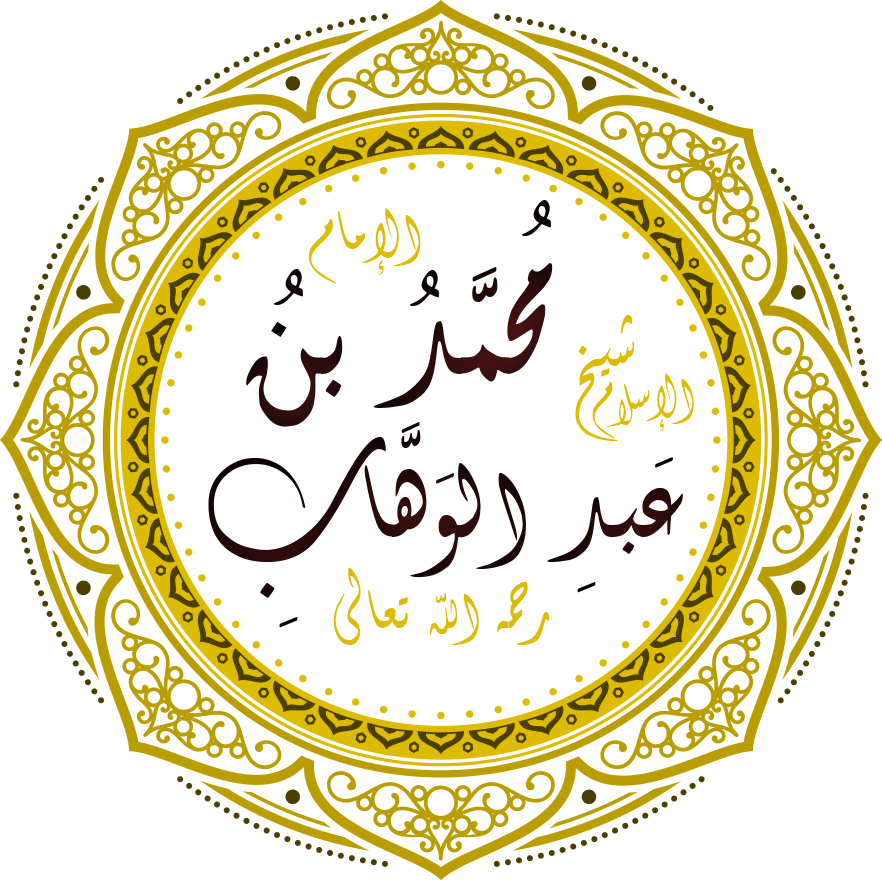

Personal life
- Born: 1115 A.H | 1703 C.E 'Uyayna, Najd, Ottoman Empire
- Died: 1206 A.H | 1792 C.E (aged 88–89) Diriyah, Emirate of Diriyah
- Children: Esmail Al Hakimi; Abdullah bin Muhammad Al Sheikh
- Main interest: Aqidah (Islamic theology)
- Notable work(s): Kitab al-Tawhid (Arabic: كتاب التوحيد; "The Book of Monotheism")
- Relatives: Sulayman (brother); Al ash-Sheikh (founded)

Religious life
- Religion: Islam
- Denomination: Salafism
- Jurisprudence: Hanbali, Ahl al-Ḥadīth/Independent
- Creed: Atharī
- Movement: Wahhabi, Salafi

Muslim leader
- Influenced by: Ahmad ibn Hanbal; Ibn Taymiyya; Ibn Qayyim al-Jawziyya; Ibn Rajab al-Hanbali; Sulayman ibn Ali ibn Musharraf; Muhammad Hayyat ibn Ibrahim al-Sindhi
- Influenced: Muhammad bin Saud Al Muqrin; House of Saud; House of Thani; Rashid Rida; Ibn Baz; Ibn Uthaymin; Ibn Jibrin; Othman al-Khamees; Assim al-Hakeem; Abdul-Rahman Al-Sudais; Saud Al-Shuraim
- Arabic name
- Personal (Ism): Muḥammad
- Patronymic (Nasab): ibn ʿAbd al-Wahhāb ibn Sulaymān ibn ʿAlī ibn Muḥammad ibn Aḥmad ibn Rāshid
- Teknonymic (Kunya): Abū al-Ḥasan
- Epithet (Laqab): an-Najdī
- Toponymic (Nisba): at-Tamīmī

Muhammad ibn Abd al-Wahhab ibn Sulayman al-Tamimi al-Najdi (Note: Arabic: الوهيب مُحَمَّد بْن عَبْد ٱلْوَهَّاب بْن سُلَيْمَان ٱلتَّمِيمِيّ, romanized: Muḥammad ibn ʿAbd al-Wahhāb ibn Sulaymān at-Tamīmī [mʊħamːad bɪn ʕabd‿alˈwah(h)aːb].) (Arabic: مُحَمَّد بن عبد الوهاب بن سليمان التميمي النجدي, romanized: Muḥammad ibn ʿAbd al-Wahhāb ibn Sulaymān at-Tamīmī al-Najdī; 1703–1792 C.E., 1115–1206 A.H.) was an Arab Muslim scholar, theologian, preacher, activist, religious leader, jurist, and reformer, who was from Najd in the Arabian Peninsula and is considered as the eponymous founder of the Wahhabi movement.

Born to a family of jurists, Ibn Abd al-Wahhab's early education consisted of learning a fairly standard curriculum of jurisprudence according to the Hanbali school, which was most prevalent in his area of birth. He promoted strict adherence to Islamic law, proclaiming the necessity of returning directly to the Quran and Hadith literature rather than relying on traditional interpretations, and insisted that every Muslim – male and female – should personally read and study the Quran. He opposed blind taqlid and called for the use of ijtihad (independent legal reasoning through research of scripture).

Being given religious training under various Sunni Muslim scholars during his travels to Hejaz and Basra, Ibn ʿAbd al-Wahhab gradually became opposed to certain rituals and practices associated with the visitation to and veneration of the shrines and tombs of Muslim saints, which he condemned as heretical religious innovation or even idolatry. While claiming to be a Hanbali, Ibn Abd al-Wahhab minimized reliance on medieval legal manuals, instead engaging in direct interpretation of scriptures. His views were also rejected by even some Hanbali scholars of his time. His call for social reforms was based on the key doctrine of tawhid (oneness of God), and was greatly inspired by the treatises of classical scholars Ibn Taymiyya (d. 728 A.H/ 1328 C.E) and Ibn al-Qayyim (d. 751 A.H/ 1350 C.E).

Despite being opposed or rejected by some of his contemporary critics amongst the religious clergy, Ibn Abd al-Wahhab charted a religio-political pact with Muhammad bin Saud to help him to establish the Emirate of Diriyah, the first Saudi state, and began a dynastic alliance and power-sharing arrangement between their families which continues to the present day in the Kingdom of Saudi Arabia. The Al ash-Sheikh, Saudi Arabia's leading religious family, are the descendants of Ibn ʿAbd al-Wahhab, and have historically led the ulama in the Saudi state, dominating the state's clerical institutions.

== Ancestry and early life ==
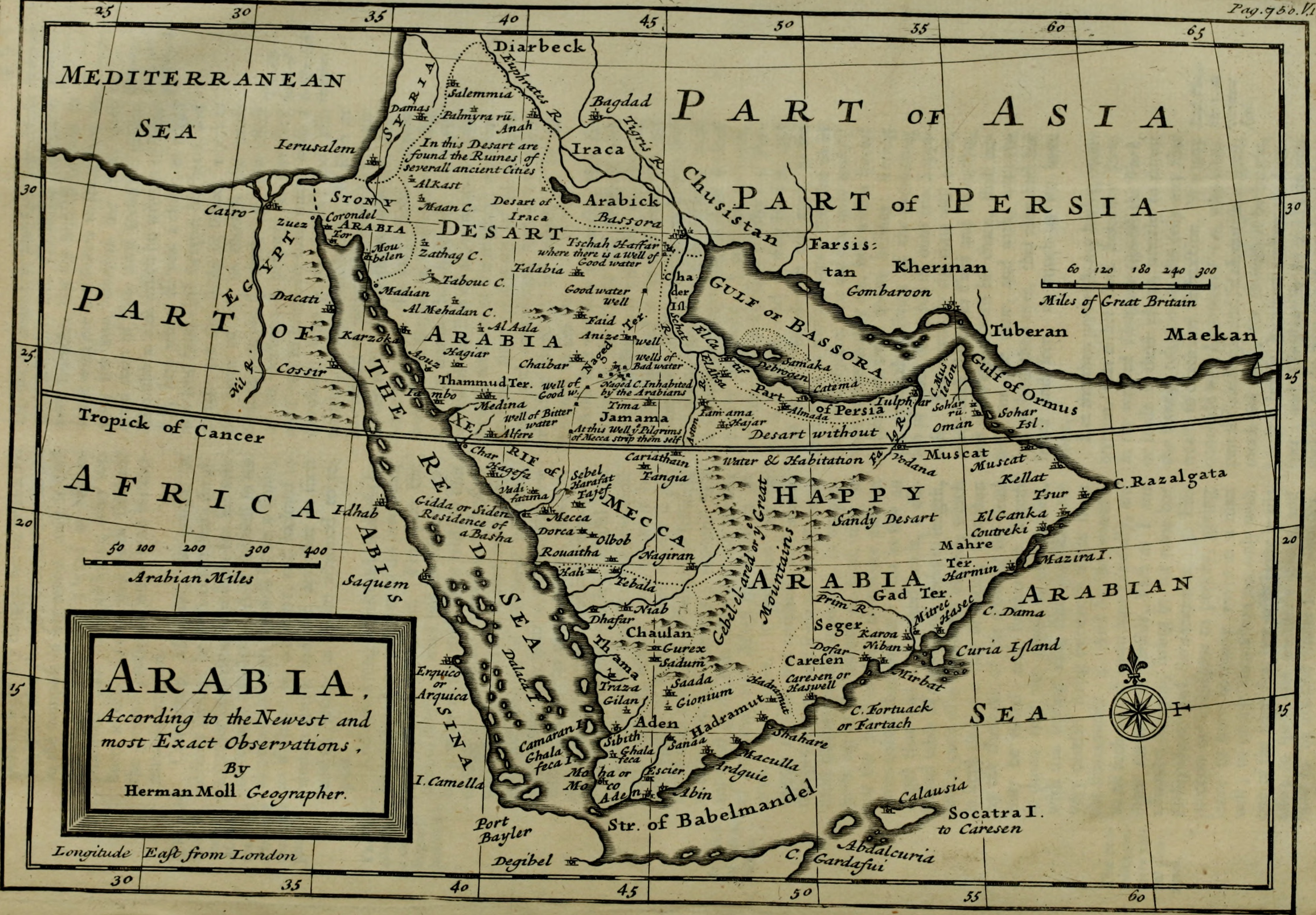
An 18th century map of the Arabian Peninsula (circa 1740s)

Muhammad ibn Abd al-Wahhab is generally acknowledged to have been born in 1703 into the sedentary and impoverished Arab clan of Banu Tamim in 'Uyayna, a village in the Najd region of central Arabia. Before the emergence of the movement, there was a very limited history of Islamic education in the area. For this reason, Ibn ʿAbd al-Wahhab had modest access to Islamic education during his youth, but his knowledge was, according to historian David Commins, "magnified by the depth of ignorance surrounding" him. Despite this, the area had nevertheless produced several notable jurists of the Hanbali school of orthodox Sunni jurisprudence, which was the school of law most prominently practiced in the area. In fact, Ibn ʿAbd al-Wahhab's own family "had produced several doctors of the school," with his father, ʿAbd al-Wahhāb, having been the Hanbali jurisconsult of the Najd and his grandfather, Sulaymān, having been a judge of Hanbali law.

== Early studies ==
Ibn ʿAbd-al-Wahhab's early education was taught by his father, and consisted of learning the Quran by heart and studying a rudimentary level of Hanbali jurisprudence and Islamic theology as outlined in the works of Ibn Qudamah (d. 1223), one of the most influential medieval representatives of the Hanbali school, whose works were regarded "as having great authority" in the Najd. The affirmation of Islamic sainthood and the ability of saints to perform miracles (karamat) by the grace of God had become a major aspect of Sunni Muslim belief throughout the Islamic world, being agreed-upon by majority of the classical Islamic scholars. However, the veneration of these practices and their reaching a level of "paganism" was "rife among the Bedouin" in 'Uyayna, which may have led to the departure of the young scholar from the area.

== Travels ==
=== Pilgrimage to Mecca ===
After leaving 'Uyayna around the age of twenty under unclear circumstances, Ibn ʿAbd al-Wahhab performed the Greater Pilgrimage in Mecca, where the scholars appear to have held opinions and espoused teachings that were unpalatable to him. After this, he went to Medina, the stay at which seems to have been "decisive in shaping the later direction of his thought." In Medina, he met a Hanbali theologian from Najd named ʿAbd Allāh ibn Ibrāhīm al-Najdī, who had been a supporter of the works of Ibn Taymiyyah (d. 1328), who holds an exceptionally high position in Islamic history. Some Sunni Muslim scholars who adhere to a scripture-focused methodology praise Ibn Taymiyyah to be a mujadid of the authentic Sunnah, taking pride in the proliferation of his strict adherence to the Qur'an, Sunnah and way of the companions of Muhammad, though his teachings had been considered heterodox and misguided by many Sunni Muslim scholars who ascribed to the Sufis of their time.

=== Tutelage under al-Sindhi ===
Ibn Abd al-Wahhab's teacher, 'Abdallah ibn Ibrahim ibn Sayf, introduced the relatively young man to Muhammad Hayat al-Sindi in Medina, who belonged to the Naqshbandi order (tariqa) of Sufism, and recommended him as a student. Muhammad Ibn ʿAbd al-Wahhab and al-Sindhi became very close, and Ibn ʿAbd al-Wahhab stayed with him for some time. Al-Sindi taught Muhammad Ibn ʿAbd al-Wahhab to reject popular religious practices associated with walis and their tombs. He also encouraged him to reject rigid imitation (Taqlid) of medieval legal commentaries and develop individual research of scriptures (Ijtihad). Influenced by al-Sindi's teachings, Ibn ʿAbd al-Wahhab became critical of the established Madh'hab system, prompting him to disregard the instruments of Usul al-Fiqh in his intellectual approach. Ibn ʿAbd al-Wahhab rarely made use of Fiqh (Islamic jurisprudence) and various legal opinions in his writings, by and large forming views based on his direct understanding of Scriptures.

Apart from his emphasis on hadith studies, aversion for the madhhab system and disregard for technical juristic discussions involving legal principles, Ibn ʿAbd al-Wahhab's views on ziyārah (visitations to the shrines of Awliyaa) were also shaped by al-Sindhi. Al-Sindi encouraged his student to reject folk practices associated with graves and saints. Various themes in al-Sindi's writings, such as his opposition to erecting tombs and drawing human images, would be revived later by the Wahhabi movement. Al-Sindi instilled in Ibn ʿAbd al-Wahhab the belief that practices like beseeching the dead saints constituted apostasy and resembled the customs of the people of Jahiliyya (pre-Islamic era). In a significant encounter between a young Ibn ʿAbd al-Wahhab and al-Sindhi reported by the Najdi historian 'Uthman Ibn Bishr (d. 1288 A.H./ 1871/2 C.E.):

"... one day Shaykh Muḥammad [Ibn 'Abdi'l-Wahhāb] stood by the chamber of the Prophet where people were calling [upon him or supplicating] and seeking help by the Prophet's chamber, blessings and peace be upon him. He then saw Muḥammad Ḥayāt [al Sindī] and came to him. The shaykh [Ibn 'Abdi'l-Wahhāb] asked, "What do you say about them?" He [al-Sindī] said, "Verily that in which they are engaged shall be destroyed and their acts are invalid.""

=== Journey to Basra ===
Following his early education in Medina, Ibn ʿAbd-al-Wahhab traveled outside of the Arabian Peninsula, venturing first to Basra which was still an active center of Islamic culture. During his stay in Basra, Ibn 'Abd al-Wahhab studied Hadith and Fiqh under the Islamic scholar Muhammad al-Majmu'i as well as philology and the sīra. In Basra, Ibn 'Abd al-Wahhab came into contact with Shi'is and would write a treatise repudiating the theological doctrines of Rafidah, an extreme sect of Shiism. He also became influenced by the writings of Hanbali theologian Ibn Rajab (d. 1393 C.E/ 795 A.H) such as "Kalimat al-Ikhlas" which inspired Ibn 'Abd al-Wahhab's seminal treatise "Kitab al-Tawhid". Here, he also observed the permissibility of popular rituals related to the veneration of holy men and their tombs, which he openly objected to. His preaching "sparked a strong backlash and he was chased out of town."

=== Further travels ===
After remaining in Basra for four years, Ibn ʿAbd-al-Wahhab departed for Baghdād in 1152 A.H./ 1739 C.E., where he married an affluent woman and stayed for five years. He then traveled to Kurdistan, Hamadān and Iṣfahān, arriving in the region at the beginning of the reign of Nādir Shāh, where he studied philosophy and sufism. Then, he continued on to Damascus and Cairo. His travels then brought him back to the Arabian Peninsula to Huraymila where his father had settled to take up the post of judge. It was here where his "Kitab al-Tawhid" was composed and where he gained his first following of students.

== Return to 'Uyaynah ==
=== Early preaching ===
His leave from Basra, marked the end of his education and by the time of his return to 'Uyayna, Ibn 'Abd al-Wahhab had mastered various religious disciplines such as Islamic Fiqh (jurisprudence), theology, hadith sciences and Tasawwuf. His exposure to various practices centered around the cult of saints and grave veneration would eventually propel Ibn 'Abd al-Wahhab to grow critical of Sufi superstitious accretions and practices. Rather than targeting "Sufism" as a phenomenon or a group, Ibn 'Abd al-Wahhab denounced particular practices which he considered sinful. Early Saudi chroniclers described practices abhorrent to Ibn 'Abd al-Wahhab that were quite common in Najd: tombs of the Prophet's Companions had frequent visitors who sought their intercession with God, particular trees were believed to possess special powers, and sacrifices were often made before a blind sage. He fashioned his reformist campaign in a manner that appealed to the socio-cultural dynamics of 18th century Arabia. Many of Ibn 'Abd al-Wahhab's scholarly treatises, pamphlets and speeches appropriated idioms of local Arab dialects, monologues of vernacular poetry and catchphrases of folk culture into his religious discourse.

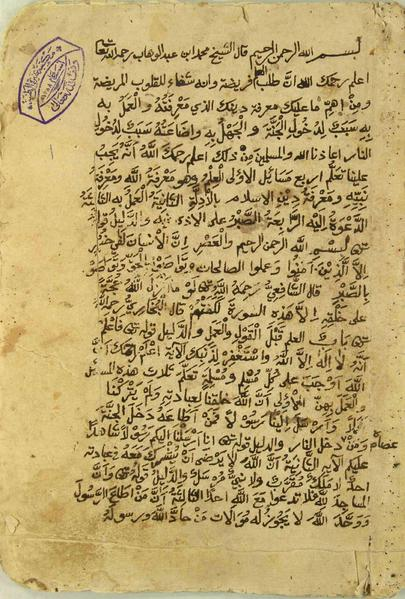
Usul al-Thalatha (Three Fundamental Principles), a pamphlet by Ibn 'Abd al-Wahhab

As a gifted communicator with a talent for breaking down his ideas into shorter units, Ibn 'Abd al-Wahhab entitled his treatises with terms such as qawāʿid ("principles"), masāʾil ("matters"), kalimāt ("phrases"), or uṣūl ("foundations"), simplifying his texts point by point for mass reading. Calling upon the people to follow his call for religious revival (tajdid ) based on following the founding texts and the authoritative practices of the first generations of Muslims, Ibn 'Abd al-Wahhab declared:

"I do not - God be blessed - conform to any particular sufi order or faqih, nor follow the course of any speculative theologian (mutakalim) or any other Imam for that matter, not even such dignitaries as ibn al-Qayyim, al-Dhahabi, or ibn Kathir, I summon you only to God, and Only Him as well as observe the path laid by His Prophet, God's messenger."

Ibn ʿAbd al-Wahhab's call gradually began to attract followers, including the ruler of 'Uyayna, Uthman ibn Mu'ammar. Upon returning to Huraymila, where his father had settled, Ibn ʿAbd al-Wahhab wrote his first work on the Unity of God. With Ibn Mu'ammar, Ibn ʿAbd al-Wahhab agreed to support Ibn Mu'ammar's political ambitions to expand his rule "over Najd and possibly beyond", in exchange for the ruler's support for Ibn ʿAbd al-Wahhab's religious teachings. During the early years of preaching, he criticised various folk practices and superstitions peacefully through sermons. Starting from 1742, Ibn 'Abd al-Wahhab would shift towards an activist stance; and began to implement his reformist ideas. First, he persuaded Ibn Mu'ammar to help him level the tomb of Zayd ibn al-Khattab, a companion of Muhammad, whose shrine was revered by locals. Secondly, he ordered the cutting down of trees considered sacred by locals, cutting down "the most glorified of all of the trees" himself. Third, he organized the stoning of a woman who confessed to having committed adultery.

These actions gained the attention of Sulaiman ibn Muhammad ibn Ghurayr of the tribe of Bani Khalid, the chief of Al-Hasa and Qatif, who held substantial influence in Najd. Ibn Ghurayr threatened Ibn Mu'ammar by denying him the ability to collect a land tax for some properties that Ibn Mu'ammar owned in Al-Hasa if he did not kill or drive away from Ibn ʿAbd al-Wahhab. Consequently, Ibn Mu'ammar forced Ibn ʿAbd al-Wahhab to leave.

The early Wahhabis had been protected by Ibn Mu'ammar in 'Uyayna, despite being persecuted in other settlements. As soon as Ibn Mu'ammar disowned them, Wahhabis were subject to excommunication (Takfir); exposing themselves to loss of lives and property. This experience of suffering reminded them of the Mihna against Ahmad Ibn Hanbal and his followers, and shaped the collective Wahhabi memory. As late as 1749, the sharif of Mecca imprisoned those Wahhabis who went to Mecca to perform the Hajj (annual pilgrimage).

=== Pact with Muhammad bin Saud ===
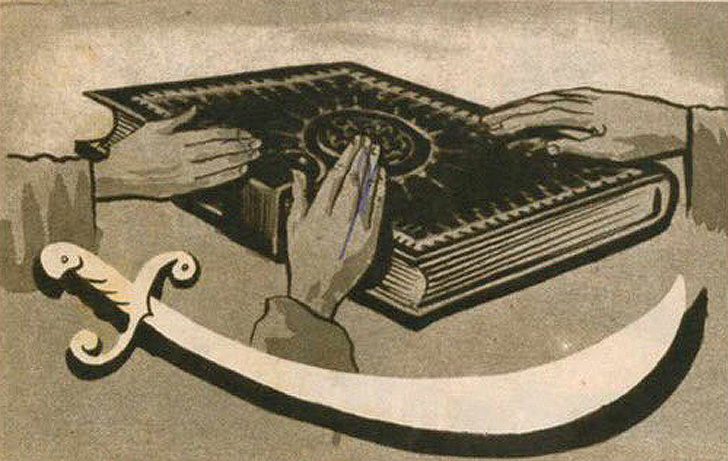
A 20th century illustration of the Diriyah Pact

Upon his expulsion from 'Uyayna, Ibn ʿAbd al-Wahhab was invited to settle in neighboring Diriyah by its ruler Muhammad ibn Saud Al Muqrin. After some time in Diriyah, Ibn ʿAbd al-Wahhab concluded his second and more successful agreement with a ruler. Ibn ʿAbd al-Wahhab and Muhammad bin Saud agreed that, together, they would bring the Arabs of the peninsula back to the "true" principles of Islam as they saw it. According to the anonymous author of Lam al-Shihab (Brilliance of the Meteor), when they first met, Ibn Saud declared:

"This oasis is yours, do not fear your enemies. By the name of God, if all Nejd was summoned to throw you out, we will never agree to expel you."

Muhammad ibn ʿAbd al-Wahhab replied:

"You are the settlement's chief and wise man. I want you to grant me an oath that you will perform jihad against the unbelievers. In return, you will be imam, leader of the Muslim community and I will be leader in religious matters."

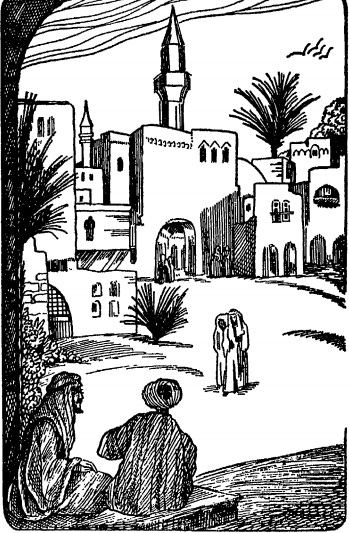
A portrait of the entrance to the city of Diriyah

The agreement was confirmed with a mutual oath of loyalty (bay'ah) in 1744. Once Al-Sa'ud made Dir'iyya a safe haven, Wahhabis from other towns took refuge. These included dissenters from Ibn Mu'ammar clan who had sworn allegiance to Ibn 'Abd al-Wahhab. The nucleus of Ibn 'Abd al-Wahhab's supporters all across Najd retreated to Dir'iyyah and formed the vanguard of the insurgency launched by Al-Saud against other towns.

From a person who started his career as a lone activist, Ibn 'Abd al-Wahhab would become the spiritual guide of the nascent Emirate of Muhammad ibn Saud Al-Muqrin. Ibn 'Abd al-Wahhab would be responsible for religious matters and Ibn Saud in charge of political and military issues. This agreement became a "mutual support pact" and power-sharing arrangement between the Aal Saud family, and the Aal ash-Sheikh and followers of Ibn ʿAbd al-Wahhab, which had remained in place for nearly 300 years, providing the ideological impetus to Saudi expansion. Reviving the teachings of Ibn Taymiyya, the Muwaḥḥidūn (Unitarian) movement emphasized strict adherence to Qur'an and Sunnah; while simultaneously championing the conception of an Islamic state based on the model of early Muslim community in Medina. Meanwhile, its Muslim and Western opponents derogatorily labelled the movement as the "Wahhābiyyah" (anglicised as "Wahhabism").

== Rise of Emirate of Dir'iyyah ==
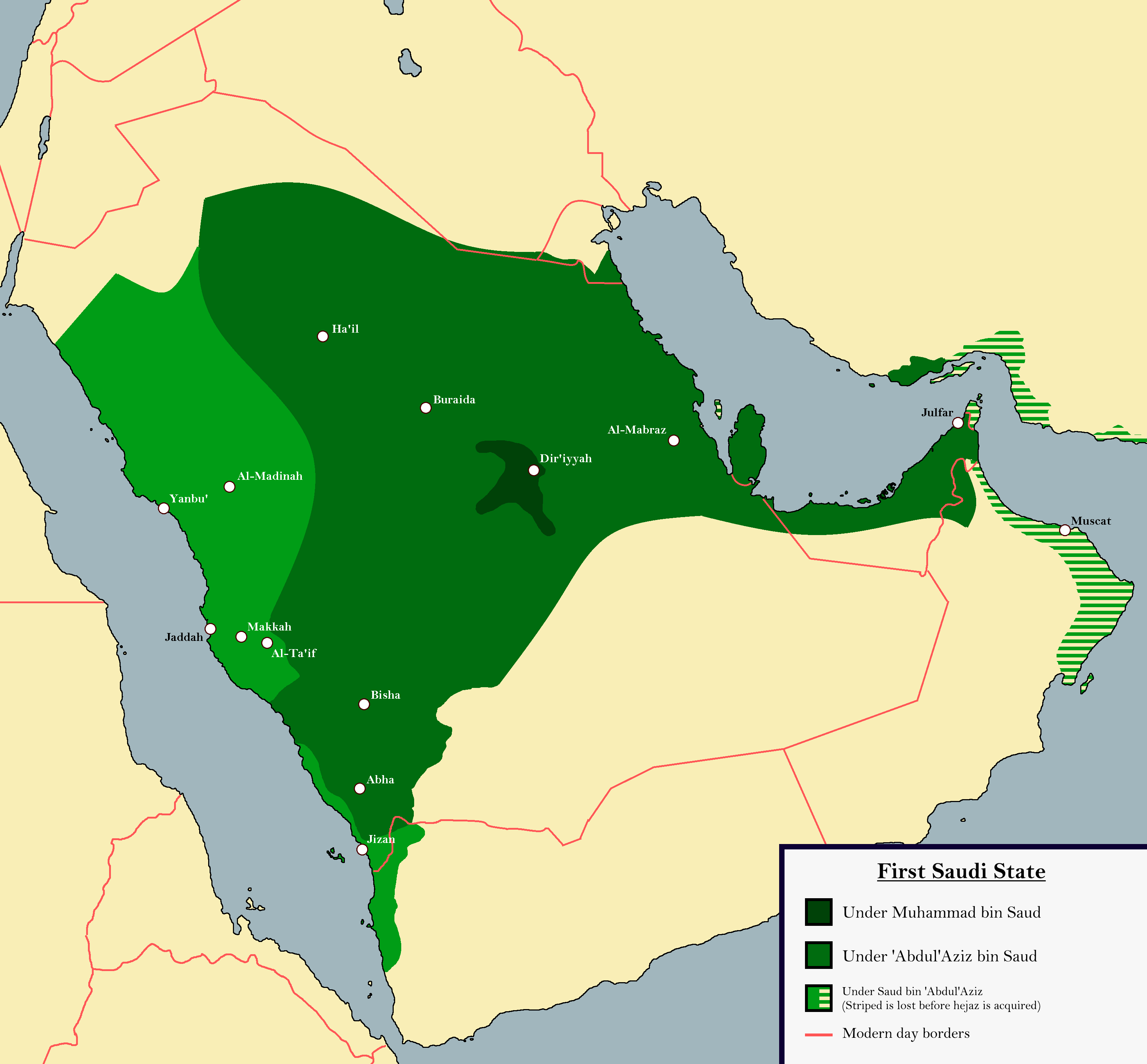
Emirate of Diriyah, the first Saudi state (1727–1818)

The 1745 pact between Muhammad ibn Saud and Muhammad ibn ʿAbd al-Wahhab marked the rise of the First Saudi state, the Emirate of Diriyah, which was established in 1727. By offering the Al-Saud a clearly defined religious mission, the alliance provided the ideological impetus to Saudi expansion. Deducing from his bitter experiences in 'Uyaynah, Ibn 'Abd al-Wahhab had understood the necessity of political backing from a strong Islamic political entity to transform the local socio-religious status quo and also safeguard Wahhabism's territorial base from external pressure. After consolidating his position in Diriyah, he wrote to the rulers and clerics of other towns; appealing them to embrace his doctrines. While some heeded his calls, others rejected it; accusing him of ignorance or sorcery.

=== War with Riyadh (1746–1773) ===
Realising the significance of efficient religious preaching (da'wa), Ibn 'Abd al-Wahhab called upon his students to master the path of reasoning and proselytising over warfare to convince other Muslims of their reformist endeavour. Between 1744 and 1746, Ibn 'Abd al-Wahhab's preaching continued in the same non-violent manner as before and spread widely across the people of Najd. Rulers of various towns across Najd pledged their allegiance to Ibn Suʿūd. This situation changed drastically around 1158/1746; when the powerful anti-Wahhabi chieftain of Riyadh, Dahhām ibn Dawwās (fl. 1187/1773), attacked the town of Manfuha which had pledged allegiance to Diriyah. This would spark a nearly 30-year long war between Diriyah and Riyadh, which lasted until 1187/1773, barring some interruptions. First conquering Najd, Muhammad ibn Saud's forces expanded the Wahhabi influence to most of the present-day territory of Saudi Arabia, eradicating various popular practices they viewed as akin to polytheism and propagating the doctrines of ʿAbd al-Wahhab.

Muhammad Ibn ʿAbd al-Wahhāb maintained that the military campaigns of the Emirate of Dirʿiyya were strictly defensive and rebuked his opponents as being the first to initiate Takfir (excommunication). Ibn 'Abd al-Wahhab had defined jihad as an activity that must have a valid religious justification and which can only be declared by an Imam whose purpose must be strictly defensive in nature. Justifying the Wahhabi military campaigns as defensive operations against their enemies, Ibn 'Abd al-Wahhab asserts:

"As for warfare, until today, we did not fight anyone, except in defense of our lives and honor. They came to us in our area and did not spare any effort in fighting us. We only initiated fighting against some of them in retaliation for their continued aggression, [The recompense for an evil is an evil like thereof] (42:40)... they are the ones who started declaring us to be unbelievers and fighting us"

==== Rebellion in Huraymila (1752–1755) ====
In 1753–4, the Wahhabis were confronted by an alarming number of towns renouncing allegiance and aligning with their opponents. Most prominent amongst these was the town of Huraymila, which had pledged allegiance to Dir'iyah in 1747. However, by 1752, a group of rebels encouraged by Ibn ʿAbd al-Wahhāb's brother, Sulaymān, had initiated a coup in Huraymila and installed a new ruler that threatened to topple the Wahhābī order. A fierce war between Diriyah and Huraymila began in a magnitude that was unprecedented. Ibn 'Abd al-Wahhab held a convocation of Wahhabis from all the settlements across Najd. Reviewing the recent desertions and defeats, he encouraged them to hold fast to their faith and recommit to the struggle.

The ensuing battles and the re-capture of Huraymila in 1168/1755, constituted a significant development in Wahhabi expansionist stage. Abd al-Azeez, the son of Muhammad ibn Saud, had emerged as the principal leader of the Wahhabi military operations. Alongside a force of 800 men, accompanied by an additional 200 under the command of the deposed ruler of Huraymila, Abd al Azeez was able to subdue the rebels. More significantly, the rationale behind the campaign was based on Ibn ʿAbd al-Wahhāb's newly written epistle Mufīd al-mustafīd, which marked a shift from the earlier posture of defensive Jihad to justify a more aggressive one. In the treatise, compiled to justify Jihad pursued by Dir'iyyah and its allies, Ibn 'Abd al-Wahhab excommunicated the inhabitants of Huraymila and declared it as a duty of Wahhabi soldiers to fight them as apostates. He also quoted several Qur'anic verses indicative of offensive forms of jihād.

=== Capture of Riyadh and retirement (1773) ===
The last point of serious threat to the Saudi state was in 1764-1765. During this period, the Ismāʿīlī Shīʿa of Najrān alongside their allied tribe of 'Ujman, combined forces to inflict a major defeat on the Saudis at the Battle of Hair in October 1764, killing around 500 men. The anti-Wahhabi forces allied with the invaders and participated in the combined siege of Dirʿiyya. However, the defenders were able to hold onto their town due to the unexpected departure of the Najranis after a truce concluded with the Saudis. A decade later in 1773-'4, 'Abd al-Azeez had conquered Riyadh and secured the entirety of al-ʿĀriḍ, after its chieftain Dahham ibn Dawwas fled. By 1776/7, Sulayman ibn Abd al-Wahhab had surrendered. The capture of Riyadh marked the point at which Muhammad Ibn 'Abd al-Wahhab delegated all affairs of governing to 'Abd al-Azeez, withdrew from public life and devoted himself to teaching, preaching and worshipping. Meanwhile, 'Abd al-Azeez would proceed with his military campaigns, conquering towns like Sudayr (1196/1781), al-Kharj (1199/1784), etc. Opposition in towns to the North like al-Qaṣīm was stamped out by 1196/1781, and the rebels in ʿUnayza were subdued by 1202/1787. Further north, the town of Ḥāʾil, was captured in 1201/1786 and by the 1780s; Wahhābīs were able to establish their jurisdiction over most of Najd.

== Death ==
After his departure from public affairs, Ibn 'Abd al-Wahhab would remain a consultant to 'Abd al-Azeez, who followed his recommendations. However, he withdrew from any active military and political activities of the Emirate of Diriyah and devoted himself to educational endeavours, preaching, and worship. His last major activity in state affairs was in 1202/1787; when he called on the people to give bay'ah (allegiance) to Suʿūd, ʿAbd al-ʿAzīz's son, as heir apparent.

Muhammad ibn 'Abd al-Wahhab fell ill and died in June 1792 C.E or 1206 A.H in the lunar month of Dhul-Qa'dah, at the age of eighty-nine. He was buried in an unmarked grave at al-Turayf in al-Dir'iyya. He left behind four daughters and six sons. Many of his sons became clerics of greater or lesser distinction. The descendants of Muhammad ibn Abd al-Wahhab are known as the Aal Ash-Shaykhs and they continued to hold a special position in the Saudi state throughout its history, which still continues.

A clear separation of roles between the Saudi family and the Wahhabi clerics had begun to emerge during the interval between Ibn 'Abd al-Wahhab's retirement from front-line politics in 1773 and his death in 1792. Although the Aal Ash-Shaykhs did not engage in politics, they comprised a significant part of the designating group of notables who gave allegiance (bay'ah) to a new ruler and acclaimed his accession. After Ibn 'Abd al-Wahhab, his son 'Abd Allah, recognised by his critics as moderate and fair-minded, would succeed him as the dominant Wahhabi cleric. The Wahhabi cause would flourish for more than two decades after Ibn 'Abd al-Wahhab's death; until the defeat of the First Saudi State in the Ottoman-Saudi war. 'Abd Allah would spend his last days as an exile in Cairo, having witnessed the destruction of Dirʿiyya and the execution of his son Sulayman ibn 'Abd Allah in 1818.

== Family ==
According to academic publications such as the Encyclopædia Britannica, Ibn ʿAbd al-Wahhab married an affluent woman during his studies in Baghdad. When she died, he inherited her property and wealth. Muhammad ibn ʿAbd al-Wahhab had six sons; Hussain (died 1809), 'Abdallah (1751–1829), Hassan, Ali (died 1829), Ibrahim and 'Abdulazeez who died in his youth. Four of his sons, Hussain, Abdullah, Ali and Ibrahim, established religious schools close to their home in Dir'iyah and taught the young students from Yemen, Oman, Najd and other parts of Arabia at their majlis (study circle). One of their pupils was Husayn Ibn Abu Bakr Ibn Ghannam, a well-known Hanbali scholar and chronicler. (Although Islamic scholar ibn 'Uthaymin writes about Ibn Ghannam that he was a Maliki scholar from al-Ahsa.)

Ibn 'Abd al-Wahhab also had a daughter named Fatimah, who was a revered Islamic scholar known for her piety, valour and beauty. She was a committed adherent to her father's reformist ideals and taught numerous men and women. Fatimah travelled a lot and remained unmarried throughout her life in order to research hadith sciences and concentrate on her scholarly endeavours. She witnessed the Fall of Dir'iyah, and in 1818 fled to Ras al-Khaimah, which was captured by the British the following year. As a result, she was again forced to emigrate along with her nephew; this time to Oman, wherein she became a major proponent of reformist teachings of the Muwahhidun and campaigned against various superstitions. Fatimah returned to Riyadh after the establishment of Emirate of Nejd in 1824. Due to her travels, she was often referred to by her appellation "Lady of the Two Migrations". As the daughter of Ibn 'Abd al-Wahhab, Fatimah became a role model for Arabian women active in educational efforts and various social undertakings.

The descendants of Ibn ʿAbd al-Wahhab, the Al ash-Sheikh, have historically led the ulama (clerical establishment) of the Saudi state, dominating the state's religious institutions. Within Saudi Arabia, the family is held in prestige similar to the Saudi royal family, with whom they share power, and has included several religious scholars and officials. The arrangement between the two families is based on the Al Saud maintaining the Al ash-Sheikh's authority in religious matters and upholding and propagating the Salafi doctrine. In return, the Al ash-Sheikh support the Al Saud's political authority thereby using its religious-moral authority to legitimize the royal family's rule.

One of his descendants includes Muhammad ibn Ibrahim Al ash-Sheikh, former Grand Mufti of Saudi Arabia.

== Views ==
=== On Tawhid ===
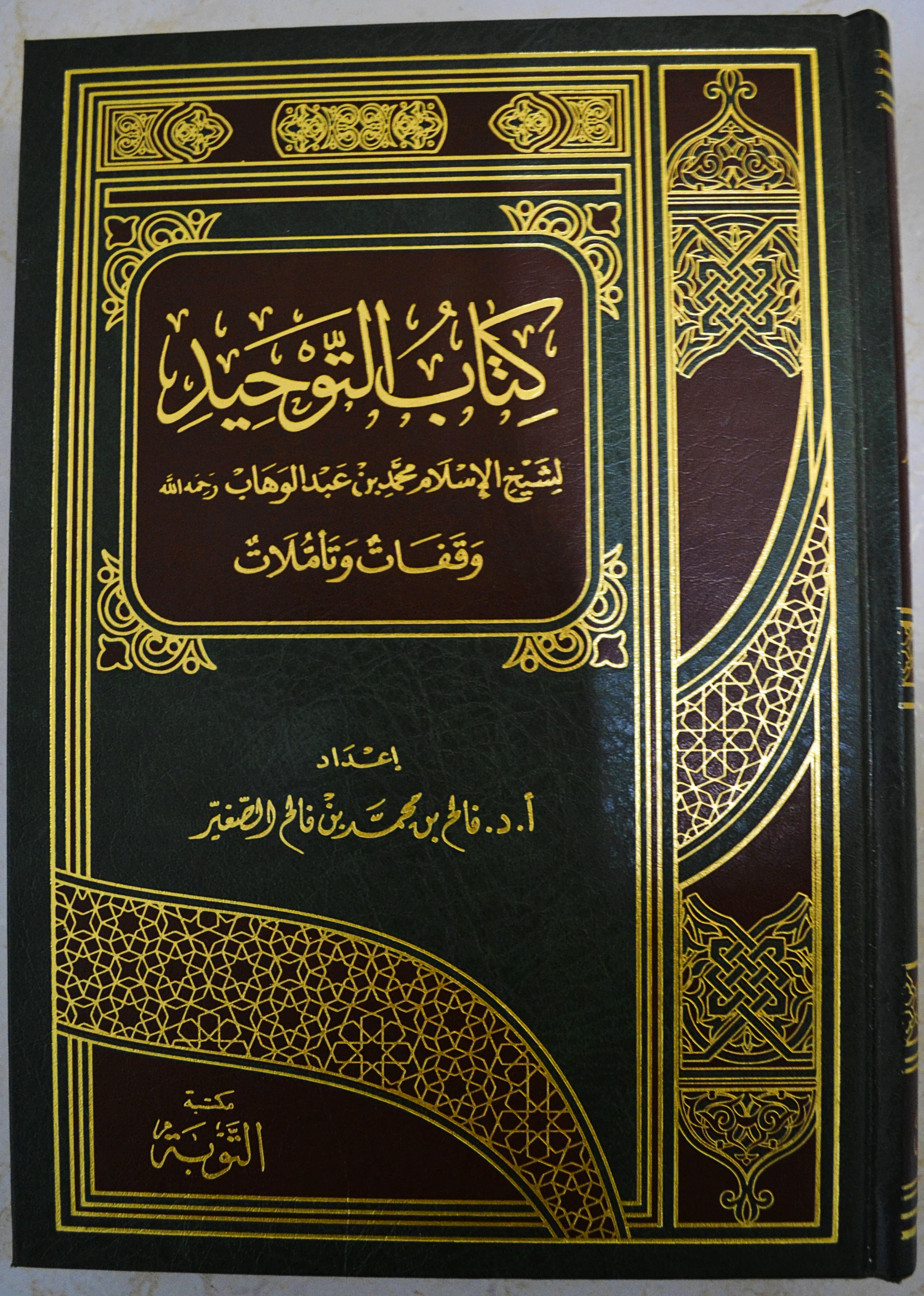
Kitab al-Tawhid (Book on Monotheism), the most popular treatise of Ibn 'Abd al-Wahhab

Muhammad Ibn ʿAbd al-Wahhab sought to revive and purify Islam from what he perceived as non-Islamic popular religious beliefs and practices by returning to what, he believed, were the fundamental principles of the Islamic religion. His works were generally short, full of quotations from the Qur'an and Hadith, such as his main and foremost theological treatise, Kitāb at-Tawḥīd (Arabic: كتاب التوحيد; "The Book of Oneness"). He taught that the primary doctrine of Islam was the uniqueness and oneness of God (tawhid), and denounced those religious beliefs and practices widespread amongst the people of Najd. Following Ibn Taymiyya's teachings on Tawhid, Ibn 'Abd al-Wahhab believed that much of Najd had descended into superstitious folk religion akin to the period of Jahiliyya (pre-Islamic era) and denounced much of their beliefs as polytheism (shirk). He associated such practices with the culture of Taqlid (imitation to established customs) adored by pagan-cults of Jahiliyya era. Based on the doctrine of Tawhid espoused in Kitab al-Tawhid, the followers of Ibn 'Abd al-Wahhab referred themselves by the designation "Al-Muwahhidun" (Unitarians).

The "core" of Ibn ʿAbd al-Wahhab's teaching is found in Kitāb at-Tawḥīd, a theological treatise which draws from material in the Qur'an and the recorded doings and sayings of the Islamic prophet Muhammad in the Hadith literature. It preaches that worship in Islam includes conventional acts of worship such as the five daily prayers (Salat); fasting (Sawm); supplication (Dua); seeking protection or refuge (Istia'dha); seeking help (Ist'ana and Istigatha) of Allah.

According to David Commins, various Muslims throughout history had held the view that declaring the testimony of faith is sufficient in becoming a Muslim. Ibn 'Abd al-Wahhab did not agree with this. He asserted that an individual who believed in the existence of intercessors or intermediaries alongside God was guilty of shirk (polytheism or idolatry). This was the major difference between him and his opponents, and led him to label his adversaries who engaged in folk rituals associated with such beliefs to be apostates (a practice known in Islamic jurisprudence as takfir) and idolaters (mushrikin).

Another major doctrine of Ibn 'Abd al-Wahhab was the concept known as Al-'Udhr bil Jahl (excuse of ignorance), wherein any ignorant person unaware of core Islamic teachings is excused by default until clarification. As per this doctrine, those who fell into beliefs of shirk (polytheism) or kufr (disbelief) cannot be excommunicated until they have direct access to scriptural evidences and get the opportunity to understand their mistakes and retract. If not, their affairs are to be delegated only to God. Hence, he believed that education and dialogue was the only effective path for the successful implementation of reforms. Explaining this concept in various pamphlets addressed to the masses and other scholars, Ibn 'Abd al-Wahhab declared:

"What has been mentioned to you about me, that I make generalised takfīr, this is from the slanders of the enemies.. [Rather] we make takfīr of the one who affirms the religion of Allāh and His Messenger but then showed enmity towards it and hindered people from it; as well as the one who worshipped idols after he came to know that this is the religion of the polytheists and beautified it for the people [inviting them to it].. [In fact] every scholar on the face of the Earth makes takfīr of them, save an obstinate or ignorant... But we [only] make takfīr of the one who associates partners with Allāh in His sole right of worship (ilāhiyyah), after we have made clear to him the proof for the futility of shirk."

Rejecting the allegations of his detractors who accused him of ex-communicating whoever didn't follow his doctrines, Ibn 'Abd al-Wahhab maintained that he only advocated orthodox Sunni doctrines. In a letter addressed to the Iraqi scholar Abdul Rahman Al-Suwaidi who had sought clarification over the rumours spread against his mission, Ibn 'Abd al-Wahhab explains:

"I am a man of social standing in my village and the people respect my word. This led some chieftains to reject my call, because I called them to what contradicts the traditions they were raised to uphold.... the chieftains directed their criticism and enmity towards our enjoining Tawheed and forbidding Shirk... Among the false accusations they propagated, ... is the claim that I accuse all Muslims, except my followers, of being Kuffar (Unbelievers)... This is truly incredible. How can any sane person accept such accusations? Would a Muslim say these things? I declare that I renounce, before Allah, these statements that only a mad person would utter. In short, what I was accused of calling to, other than enjoining Tawheed and forbidding Shirk, is all false."

=== On Taqlid ===
Muhammad ibn 'Abd al-Wahhab was highly critical of the practice of Taqlid (blind-following), which in his view, deviated people away from Qur'an and Sunnah. He also advocated for Ijtihad of qualified scholars in accordance with the teachings of Qur'an and Hadith. In his legal writings, Ibn 'Abd al-Wahhab referred to a number of sources- Qur'an, hadith, opinions of companions, Salaf as well as the treatises of the 4 schools of thought. Ibn 'Abd al-Wahhab argued that Qur'an condemned blind emulation of forefathers and nowhere did it stipulate scholarly credentials for a person to refer to it directly. His advocacy of Ijtihad and harsh denunciation of Taqlid arose widespread condemnation from Sufi orthodoxy in Najd and beyond, compelling him to express many of his legal verdicts (fatwas) discreetly, using convincing juristic terms. He differed from Hanbali school in various points of law and in some cases, also departed from the positions of the 4 schools. In his treatise Usul al-Sittah (Six Foundations), Ibn 'Abd al-Wahhab vehemently rebuked his detractors for raising the description of Mujtahids to what he viewed as humanely unattainable levels. He condemned the establishment clergy as a class of oppressors who ran a "tyranny of wordly possessions" by exploiting the masses to make money out of their religious activities. The teachings of Medinan hadith scholar Muhammad Hayat as Sindi highly influenced the anti-taqlid views of Ibn 'Abd al Wahhab.

Muhammad Ibn Abd al-Wahhab opposed partisanship to madhabs (legal schools) and didn't consider it obligatory to follow a particular madhab. Rather, in his view, the obligation is to follow Qur'an and the Sunnah. Referring to the classical scholars Ibn Taymiyya and Ibn Qayyim, ibn 'Abd al-Wahhab condemned the popular practice prevalent amongst his contemporary scholars to blindfollow latter-day legal works and urged Muslims to take directly from Qur'an and Sunnah. He viewed it as a duty upon every Muslim, laymen and scholar, male & female, to seek knowledge directly from the sources. Radically departing from both Ibn Taymiyya and Ibn Qayyim, Ibn 'Abd al-Wahhab viewed the entirety of the prevalent mad'hab system of jurisprudence (Fiqh) as a fundamentally corrupt institution, seeking a radical reform of scholarly institutions and preached the obligation of all Muslims to directly refer to the foundational texts of revelation. He advocated a form of scholarly authority based upon the revival of the practice of ittiba, i.e., laymen following the scholars only after seeking evidences. The prevalent legal system was, in his view, a "factory for the production of slavish emulators" symbolic of Muslim decline.

=== On the nature of Nubuwwah (Prophethood) ===
Muhammad Ibn 'Abd al-Wahhab elucidated his concept on the nature of Prophethood in his book Mukhtaṣar sīrat al-Rasūl ("Abridgement of the life of the Prophet"), an extensive biographical work on the Islamic prophet Muhammad. Mukhtaṣar was written with the purpose of explaining Muhammad's role in universal history by undermining certain prophetologic conceptions that had come to prominence among Sunnī religious circles during the twelfth Islamic century. These included negating those concepts and beliefs that bestowed the Prophet with mystical attributes that elevated Muhammad beyond the status of ordinary humans. In his introduction to Mukhtasar, Ibn 'Abd al-Wahhab asserts that every Prophet came with the mission of upholding Tawhid and prohibiting shirk. Ibn 'Abd al-Wahhab further tries to undermine the belief in the pre-existence of Muḥammad as a divine light preceding all other creation, a salient concept that served as an aspect of Prophetic devotion during the eleventh Islamic century. Additionally, Ibn ʿAbd al-Wahhāb omitted mentioning other episodes narrated in various sirah (Prophetic biography) works such as trees and stones allegedly expressing veneration for Muḥammad, purification of Muhammad's heart by angels, etc. which suggested that Muḥammad possessed characteristics that transcend those of ordinary humans.

Ibn 'Abd al-Wahhab adhered to Ibn Taymiyya's understanding of the concept of Isma (infallibility) which insisted that ʿiṣma does not prevent prophets from committing minor sins or speaking false things. This differed from the alternative understanding of Sunni theologians like Fakhr al-Dīn al-Rāzi, Qāḍī ʿIyāḍ, etc. who had emphasised the complete independence of the Prophet from any form of error or sin.

Furthermore, Ibn 'Abd al-Wahhab had given little importance to Prophetic miracles in his Mukhtaṣar. Although he hadn't denied miracles as an expression of Divine Omnipotence so long as they are attested by Qur'an or authentic hadith, Al-Mukhtasar represented an open protest against the exuberance of miracles that characterised later biographies of Muḥammad. In Ibn 'Abd al-Wahhab's view, miracles are of little significance in the life of Muḥammad in comparison to that of the previous prophets, since central to his prophethood were the institutionalisation of Jihād and the ḥudud punishments. Contrary to prevalent religious beliefs, Muḥammad was not portrayed as the central purpose of creation in the historical conception of Mukhtaṣar. Instead, he has a function within creation and for the created beings. Rather than being viewed as an extraordinary performer of miracles, Muhammad should instead be upheld as a model of emulation. By depriving the person of Muḥammad of all supernatural aspects not related to Wahy (revelation) and Divine intervention, Ibn 'Abd al-Wahhab also re-inforced his rejection of beliefs and practices related to cult of saints and veneration of graves. Thus, Ibn ʿAbd al-Wahhāb's conception of history emphasised the necessity to follow the role-model of Muḥammad and re-establish the Islamic order.

=== Influence on Salafism ===
Ibn ʿAbd al-Wahhab's movement is known today as Wahhabism (Arabic: الوهابية, romanized: Wahhābiyyah). The designation of his doctrine as Wahhābiyyah actually derives from his father's name, ʿAbd al-Wahhab. Many adherents consider the label "Wahhabism" as a derogatory term coined by his opponents, and prefer it to be known as the Salafi movement. Modern scholars of Islamic studies point out that "Salafism" is a term applied to several forms of puritanical Islam in various parts of the world, while Wahhabism refers to the specific Saudi school, which is seen as a more strict form of Salafism. However, modern scholars remark that Ibn 'Abd al-Wahhab's followers adopted the term "Salafi" as a self-designation much later. His early followers denominated themselves as Ahl al-Tawhid and al-Muwahhidun ("Unitarians" or "those who affirm/defend the unity of God"), and were labeled "Wahhabis" by their opponents.

The Salafiyya movement was not directly connected to Ibn 'Abd al-Wahhab's movement in Najd. According to professor Abdullah Saeed, Ibn ʿAbd al-Wahhab should rather be considered as one of the "precursors" of the modern Salafiyya movement since he called for a return to the pristine purity of the early eras of Islam by adhering to the Qur'an and the Sunnah, rejection of the blind following (Taqlid) of earlier scholars and advocating for Ijtihad. Scholars like Adam J. Silverstein consider Wahhabi movement as "the most influential expression of Salafism of the Islamist sort, both for its role in shaping (some might say: 'creating') modern Islamism, and for disseminating salafi ideas widely across the Muslim world."

=== On Fiqh ===
Muhammad Ibn 'Abd al-Wahhab's approach to Fiqh (Islamic jurisprudence) was based on four major principles:

- Prohibition on speaking about God without 'Ilm (knowledge)
- Ambiguous issues in Scriptures are a mercy to the community and is neither forbidden nor obligatory
- Obligation to abide by the clear evidences from Scriptures
- Rulings of halal (allowance) and haram (prohibition) are clear in the Scriptures and those issues which are unclear should be left as ambiguous

According to Ibn 'Abd al-Wahhab, the clear meaning of authentic hadiths takes precedence over the opinions of any other scholar, even if it went against the agreement of the eponyms of the four madhabs. In line with these principles, he encouraged all believers to engage directly with the Scriptures while respecting Ikhtilaf (scholarly differences), writing:

"The companions of the Messenger of God, may God bless him and grant him peace, differed on various issues without denunciation, so long as the text was not clear. It is upon the believer to place his concern and intent to know the command of God and His Messenger in those matters of disagreement, and to act accordingly whilst respecting the people of knowledge, and respect them, even if they erred, but he does not take them as lords besides God; This is the way of those who are blessed. As for those who throw away their speech and do not respect, then this is the path of those who have incurred God's wrath."

Throughout his epistles like Arbaʿ qawāʿid tadūruʾl-aḥkām ʿalayhā (Four rules on which rulings revolve), Ibn 'Abd al-Wahhab fiercely attacked the prevalent Hanbali Fiqh opinions; with a broader view of re-orienting the Fiqh tradition. Ibn 'Abd al-Wahhab challenged the madhhab system, by advocating for a direct understanding of the Scriptures. Rather than rejecting madhabs outright, he sought a reformation of the system by condemning prevalent trends within the madhabs. He criticised the madhhab partisans for adhering solely to medieval Fiqh manuals of later scholars and ignoring Qur'an, Hadith and opinions of early Imams. He rebuked the contemporary Shafi'i scholars for being partisans of Ibn Hajar al Haytami (d. 1566) and relying solely on his 16th-century manual Tuhfat al Muhtaj. Similarly, he critiqued the Malikis for being dependent on the Mukhtasar of the Egyptian jurist Khalil ibn Ishaq (d. 1365) rather than acting upon authentic traditions (hadith). In addition to criticising the Madhab partisans, he berated the advocates of Taqlid for discouraging the practice of Ijtihad and called on the laity to follow scholars only after asking for Scriptural evidences. Most noticeably, Ibn 'Abd al-Wahhab rejected the authority of Al-Iqna and Al-Muntaha - two of the most important medieval Hanbali works for the regional clerics of Arabia - asserting:

"The Hanbalis are the least prone of all people to innovation. [Yet] most of the Iqna and the Muntahā [two late Hanbali authoritative works] conflicts with the view of Ahmad and his explicit statements, not to mention the hadith of the Messenger of God"

In calling for a direct return to the Scriptures, Ibn 'Abd al-Wahhab was not a literalist and often strongly objected to literalist approaches and ritualism of religion that came with it. He believed that pure intentions (Niyyah) constituted the essence of all virtous actions and upheld its superiority over dull ritualism. As a deferential and accomplished jurist with the experience of religious training under numerous masters in his travels, Ibn 'Abd al-Wahhab opposed the rigid, hardline views of the tradition-bound ulema who had excommunicated sinful, unrepenting Muslims; thereby making their blood forfeit based on their reading of the reports of Muhammad and Companions. On the other hand, Ibn 'Abd al-Wahhab contextualised those reports; arguing that they must be understood in recognition of historical circumstances. According to his view, sincerity and purity of intent (Ikhlas) could expiate the evil of sins committed in mistakes. Ibn 'Abd al-Wahhab's legal approach began with hadith authentication, followed by contextualised intrapolation in consideration of Hanbali legal principles such as Maslaha (common good). Other legal criteria involved upholding the spirit of the law, Maqasid al-Sharia, and intent behind pronouncing legal verdicts which addressed various themes such as societal justice and safeguarding women. He also believed in a holistic legal understanding of Qur'anic verses and hadith, distinguishing between general rules applicable for all Muslims and rulings unique to various life-time situations.

=== On Islamic revival ===
As a young scholar in Medina, Muhammad Ibn 'Abd al-Wahhab was profoundly influenced by the revivalist doctrines taught by his teachers Muhammad Hayyat ibn Ibrahim al-Sindhi and Abdullah Ibn Ibrahim Ibn Sayf. Much of the Wahhabi teachings such as opposition to saint-cults, radical denunciation of blind-following medieval commentaries, adherence to Scriptures and other revivalist thoughts came from Muhammad Hayyat. Ibn Abd al-Wahhab's revivalist efforts were based on a strong belief in Tawhid (Oneness of Allah) and a firm adherence to the Sunnah. His reformative efforts left exemplary marks on contemporary Islamic scholarship. Viewing Blind adherence ( Taqlid ) as an obstacle to the progress of Muslims, he dedicated himself to educating the masses for them to be vanguards of Islam. According to Ibn Abd al-Wahhab, the degradation and lagging behind of Muslims was due to their neglect of the teachings of Islam, emphasizing that progress could be achieved only by firmly adhering to Islam. He also campaigned against popular Sufi practices associated with istigatha, myths and superstitions.

=== On Sufism ===
Ibn ʿAbd al-Wahhab praised Tasawwuf. He stated the popular saying: "From among the wonders is to find a Sufi who is a faqih and a scholar who is an ascetic (zahid)". He described Tasawwuf as "the science of the deeds of the heart, which is known as the science of Suluk", and considered it as an important branch of Islamic religious sciences.

At the end of his treatise, Al-Hadiyyah al-Suniyyah, Ibn ʿAbd al-Wahhab's son 'Abd Allah speaks positively on the practice of tazkiah (purification of the inner self). 'Abd Allah Ibn ʿAbd al-Wahhab ends his treatise saying:

We do not negate the way of the Sufis and the purification of the inner self from the vices of those sins connected to the heart and the limbs as long as the individual firmly adheres to the rules of Shari'ah and the correct and observed way. However, we will not take it on ourselves to allegorically interpret (ta'wil) his speech and his actions. We only place our reliance on, seek help from, beseech aid from and place our confidence in all our dealings in Allah Most High. He is enough for us, the best trustee, the best mawla and the best helper. May Allah send peace on our master Muhammad, his family and companions.

=== On social reforms ===
Muhammad ibn 'Abd al-Wahhab concerned himself with the social reformation of his people. As an 18th-century reformer, Muhammad ibn 'Abd al Wahhab called for the re-opening of Ijtihad by qualified persons through strict adherence to Scriptures in reforming society. His thoughts reflected the major trends apparent in the 18th-century Islamic reform movements. Unlike other reform movements which were restricted to da'wa, Ibn 'Abd al-Wahhab was also able to transform his movement into a successful Islamic state. Thus, his teachings had a profound influence on majority of Islamic reform-revivalist movements since the 18th century. Numerous significant socio-economic reforms would be advocated by the Imam during his lifetime. His reforms touched over various fields such as aqeeda, ibaadat (ritual acts of worship), muamalaat (social interactions), etc. In the affairs of mu'amalat, he harshly rebuked the practice of leaving endowments to prevent the rightful heirs (particularly the females) from receiving their deserved inheritance. He also objected to various forms of riba (usury) as well as the practice of presenting judges with gifts, which according to him, was nothing more than bribing. He also opposed and brought an end to numerous un-Islamic taxes that were forced upon the people.

==== On women ====
The legal writings of Ibn 'Abd al-Wahhab reflected a general concern of female welfare and justice. In line with this approach, Ibn 'Abd al-Wahhab denounced the practice of instant triple talaq, counting it as only a single talaq (regardless of the number of pronouncements). The outlawing of triple talaq is considered to be one of the most significant reforms across the Islamic World in the 20th and 21st centuries. Following a balanced approach in issues of gender, Ibn Abd al-Wahhab advocated moderation between men and women in social interactions as well as spirituality. According to Ibn Abd al-Wahhab, women has a place in society with both rights and responsibility, with the society being obliged to respect her status and protect her. He also condemned forced marriages and declared any marriage contracted without the consent of a woman (be it minor, virgin or non-virgin) to be "invalid". This too was a significant reform as well as a break from the four Sunni schools which, according to some opinions, allowed the wali (ward/guardian) to compel minor daughters into marriage without consent. Ibn Abd al-Wahhab also stipulated the permission of the guardian as a condition in marriage (in line with traditional Hanbali, Shafi'i and Maliki schools). Nevertheless, as a practical jurist, Ibn Abd al-Wahhab allowed guardians to delegate the right to contract marriages to women herself, after which his permission cannot be denied. He also allowed women the right to stipulate favourable conditions for her in the marriage contract. Ibn Abd al-Wahhab also defended the woman's right to divorce through Khul' for various reasons, including in cases wherein she despised her husband. He also prohibited the killing of women, children and various non-combatants such as monks, elderly, blind, shaykhs, slaves and peasants in warfare.

In addition to these, Ibn Abd al-Wahhab also defended married women's right to maintenance from her husband; as well as bride's right to receive mahr from her groom. He also strongly campaigned against domestic abuses against women, enjoining men to treat their wives with kindness.

Muhammad ibn Abd al-Wahhab believed in social participation of women for communal solidarity; as per Islamic codes of modesty (Haya) that was inclusive to all sections of society, especially the poor. He also campaigned for improving female literacy and asserted women's education as part of their religious rights and duties. Educated elite women played an important role in the Wahhabi movement through social activism and in various instances also weld significant political influence. Many women were trained in various religious disciplines, memorising Qur'an and being proficient in hadith sciences; which gained them civic respect as well as a source of income by teaching. As a result, the townsfolk of 19th-century Central Arabia had noticeably higher rates of literacy as observed by foreign travellers. Ibn Abd al-Wahhab also encouraged educated women to be active in various communal activities so as to bolster the reformist campaigns of the Muwahhidun, educating other women, generating awareness of superstitions as well as other cultural activities such as reciting poetry, playing tambourine during feasts, weddings and various social gatherings. Ibn Abd al-Wahhab's own daughter, Fatima was an influential Islamic scholar active in social and communal affairs and would influence subsequent generations of Arabian women.

=== On Jihad ===
Muhammad Ibn ʿAbd al-Wahhāb defined jihad as an activity that must have a valid religious justification and which can only be declared by an Imam whose purpose must be strictly defensive in nature. He viewed the military campaigns of the Emirate of Dirʿiyya as strictly defensive operations against aggressive opponents who initiated Takfir against his followers. Justifying the Wahhabi military campaigns as primarily defensive operations, Ibn Abd al-Wahhab asserts:

"As for warfare, until today, we did not fight anyone, except in defense of our lives and honor. They came to us in our area and did not spare any effort in fighting us. We only initiated fighting against some of them in retaliation for their continued aggression, [The recompense for an evil is an evil like thereof] (42:40)... they are the ones who started declaring us to be unbelievers and fighting us"

=== On Muslim saints ===
Ibn ʿAbd al-Wahhab strongly condemned the veneration of Muslim saints (which he described as worship) or associating divinity to beings other than God, labeling it as shirk. Despite his great aversion to venerating the saints after their earthly passing and seeking their intercession, it should nevertheless be noted that Muhammad ibn Abd al-Wahhab did not deny the existence of saints as such; on the contrary, he acknowledged that "the miracles of saints (karāmāt al-awliyāʾ) are not to be denied, and their right guidance by God is acknowledged" when they acted properly during their life. Muhammad ibn Abd al-Wahhab opposed the practice of pilgrimage of saints' tombs as it is considered as Bidʻah (heresy), such as the practice of the pilgrimage towards a tomb believed belong to a companion of the Prophet named Dhiraar ibn al-Azwar in the valley of Ghobaira.

=== On non-Muslims ===
According to the political scientist Dore Gold, Muhammad ibn Abd al-Wahhab presented a strong anti-Christian and anti-Judaic stance in his main theological treatise Kitāb at-Tawḥīd, describing the followers of both Christian and Jewish faiths as sorcerers who believe in devil-worship, and by citing a hadith attributed to the Islamic prophet Muhammad (Note: The attribution of this hadith is disputed; according to other sources it should be attributed to 'Umar ibn al-Khattab, companion of the Islamic prophet Muhammad and second caliph of the Rashidun Caliphate.) he stated that capital punishment for the sorcerer is "that he be struck with the sword". Ibn Abd al-Wahhab asserted that both the Christian and Jewish religions had improperly made the graves of their prophet into places of worship and warned Muslims not to imitate this practice. Ibn Abd al-Wahhab concluded that "The ways of the People of the Book are condemned as those of polytheists."

== Reception ==
=== By contemporaries ===
The doctrines of Ibn Abd al-Wahhab were criticized by a number of Islamic scholars during his lifetime, accusing him of disregarding Islamic history, monuments, traditions and the sanctity of Muslim life. His critics were mainly ulama from his homeland, the Najd region of central Arabia, which was directly affected by the growth of the Wahhabi movement, based in the cities of Basra, Mecca, and Medina. Some of the early opponents of Ibn Abd al-Wahhab classified his doctrine as a "Kharijite sectarian heresy".

On the other hand, Ibn Abd al-Wahhāb and his supporters held that they were the victims of aggressive warfare; accusing their opponents of starting the pronouncements of Takfir (excommunication) and maintained that the military operations of Emirate of Dirʿiyya were strictly defensive. The memory of the unprovoked military offensive launched by Dahhām ibn Dawwās (fl. 1187/1773), the powerful chieftain of Riyadh, on Diriyya in 1746 was deeply engrained in the Wahhabi tradition. Early Wahhabi chronicler Ibn Ghannām states in his book Tarikh an-Najd (History of Najd) that Ibn Abd al-Wahhāb did not order the use of violence until his enemies excommunicated him and deemed his blood licit:

"He gave no order to spill blood or to fight against the majority of the heretics and the misguided until they started ruling that he and his followers were to be killed and excommunicated."

By 1802, the Ottoman Empire had officially begun to wage religious campaigns against the Wahhabis, issuing tracts condemning them as Kharijites. In contrast, Ibn Abd al-Wahhab profoundly despised the "decorous, arty tobacco-smoking, music happy, drum pounding, Egyptian and Ottoman nobility who traveled across Arabia to pray at Mecca each year", and intended to either subjugate them to his doctrine or overthrow them. A handful of Arabian Hanbalis participated on the Ottoman side of the controversy. Muhammad ibn 'Abdullah ibn Humayd's 19th century biographical dictionary sheds light on those Hanbali scholars. However, the reliability of his biography itself is disputed for its inherent biases, which portrays Ibn Abd al-Wahhab and his followers as heretics. It also misrepresents many Najdi Hanbali scholars as on the side of Ottoman Hanbalis.

Ibn Humayd's maternal lineage, Al-Turki, was of some local renown for its religious scholars, including two men who opposed the Wahhabi movement. One of them, named Ibn Muhammad, compared Ibn Abd al-Wahhab with Musaylimah. He also accused Ibn Abd al-Wahhab of wrongly declaring fellow Muslims to be infidels based on a misguided reading of Quranic passages and prophetic traditions (Hadith), and of wrongly declaring all scholars as infidels who did not agree with his "deviant innovation". In contrast to this anti-Wahhabi family tradition, Ibn Humayd's early education included extensive studies under two Wahhabi Shaykhs, both praised in his biographical dictionary. He then travelled to Damascus and Mecca, wherein he attended lessons of men known for strong anti-Wahhabi convictions. Ibn Humayd's compatibility with Ottoman religious outlook made him eligible for the post of Ottoman Mufti in Mecca.

Another Hanbali scholar whom Ibn Humayd portrays as a central figure in rejecting Ibn Abd al-Wahhab's doctrine was Ibn Fayruz Al-Tamimi al-Ahsai (1729/30 – 1801/02). Ibn Fayruz publicly repudiated Ibn Abd al-Wahhab's teachings when he sent an envoy to him. Ibn Fayruz then wrote to Sultan Abdul Hamid I and requested Ottoman assistance to subjugate Ibn Abd al-Wahhab's followers, whom he referred to as the "seditious Kharijites" of Najd. The Wahhabis, in turn, came to view him as one of their worst enemies and an exemplar of idolatry.

According to Ibn Humayd, Ibn Abd al-Wahhab's father criticized his son for his unwillingness to specialize in jurisprudence and disagreed with his doctrine and declared that he would be the cause of wickedness. Similarly his brother, Sulayman ibn Abd al-Wahhab, wrote one of the first treatises refuting the Wahhabi doctrine, The Divine Thunderbolts in Refutation of Wahhabism (Al-Šawā'iq Al-Ilāhiyya fī Al-radd 'alā Al-Wahhābiyya), alleging that Muhammad was ill-educated and intolerant, and classing his views as fringe and fanatical. Sulayman's first anti-Wahhabi treatise was followed by a second book, The Unmistakable Judgment in the Refutation of Muhammad ibn 'Abd al-Wahhab (Faṣl al-Ḫiṭāb fī Al-radd 'alā Muḥammad ibn 'Abd al-Wahhāb). Later Muwahhidun scholarly figures like Abdullah ibn Abd al-Latif Aal al-Shaykh (d. 1921 C.E) would respond to these accusations by asserting that Ibn Abd al-Wahhab refrained from making Takfir:

" Shaykh Muhammad (May God have Mercy on him) never made takfeer of the people in the beginning; except via establishing the proofs and the da'wah, because at that time there was a dearth of knowledge of the message (of Islām) and for that reason he said 'due to their ignorance and the lack of anyone who makes them aware'. However, as for those on whom the proofs are established, then there is nothing to prevent takfeer being made on such people"

Muhammad ibn Abd al-Wahhab was known to have had disagreements with both his father and his brother Sulayman. Sulayman, his brother, disputed many of his doctrinal statements and was one of his staunch opponents during a certain time-period. Ibn Abd al-Wahhab's father disagreed with his son's metholodolgy in implementing reforms. According to historical records, Sulayman declared his repentance and started to support his brother during later life, after understanding the doctrines and objectives of Ibn Abd al-Wahhab's revivalist movement.

The 19th century anti-Wahhabi critic and historian Ahmad ibn al-Zayni Dahlan, Ottoman empire's Grand Mufti of the Shafi'i madhab in Mecca, recorded the account of the dispute between Muhammad ibn ʿAbd al-Wahhab and his brother Sulayman, reporting that:

Sulayman [ibn ʿAbd al-Wahhab] once asked his brother Muhammad [ibn ʿAbd al-Wahhab], "How many are the pillars of Islam?" "Five," he answered. Sulayman replied, "No, you have added a sixth one: He who does not follow you is not a Muslim. This, to you, is the sixth pillar of Islam."

According to various historical records, Sulayman repented and joined the religious mission of his brother. However, there is a disagreement regarding his repentance. While earlier Najdi chroniclers like Ibn Ghannam reported he repented and embraced Ibn 'Abd al-Wahhab's cause in Diriyah, later historians like Ibn Bishr simply mentions his departure to Diriyah with his family and his last years under the protection of Diriyah, while being allowed by state-allotted stipend. A letter attributed to Sulayman also mentions his public repentance.

The Ottoman Grand Mufti of Mecca, Ahmad Zayni Dahlan (d. 1886), wrote an anti-Wahhabi treatise, in which he listed the religious practices that the Najdi Hanbalis considered idolatrous: visiting the tomb of Muhammad, seeking the intercession of saints, venerating Muhammad and obtaining the blessings of saints. He also accused Ibn Abd al-Wahhab of not adhering to the Hanbali school and that he was deficient in learning. However, Ibn Abd al-Wahhab had believed that visiting the tomb of Muhammad was a righteous deed, referring to it as "among the best of deeds" while condemning its excesses. The medieval theologians Ibn Taymiyyah and Ibn Qayyim, who inspired Ibn Abd al-Wahhab, had issued Fatwas declaring the visitations to the tomb of Muhammad to be haram (forbidden); which would lead to their imprisonment.

In response, the British Indian Ahl-i Hadith scholar Muhammad Bashir Sahsawani (1834-1908 C.E) wrote the treatise Sayaanah al-Insaan an Waswaswah al-Shaikh Dahlaan in order to refute Dahlan. Sahsawani asserted that after his correspondence with various scholars of the Muwahhidun movement and study of their creedal works; he came to the conclusion that the allegation that they excommunicated "non-Wahhabis" were false and slanderous.

The Islamic scholar Muhammad Rashid Rida (d. 1935 C.E/ 1354 A.H) in his introduction to al-Sahsawani's refutation of Dahlan, described Ibn Abd al-Wahhab as a mujaddid repelling the innovations and deviations in Muslim life. Through his Al-Manar magazine, Rashid Rida greatly contributed to the spread of Ibn Abd al-Wahhab's teachings in the Islamic world. He was a strong supporter of Ibn Taymiyyah and scholars of Najd, publishing works in his magazine entitled Majmooah al-Rasaail wa al-Masaail al-Najdiyyah and al-Wahhaabiyoon wa al-Hijaaz. Rida notes that given Dahlan's position in Mecca, and availability there of the works of Ibn Abd al-Wahhab, he must have simply chosen to write otherwise. Rida also argued that Dahlan simply wrote what he heard from people, and criticised him for not verifying reports and seeking out the writings of Ibn Abd al-Wahhab. He condemned Dahlan for his ignorance and his sanctioning of acts of kufr and shirk; based on his reinterpretation of Islamic texts.

Rashid Rida contended that Ibn Abd al-Wahhab was a victim of persecution by the combined oppression of three forces: i) the power of state and its rulers ii) power of hypocritical scholars and iii) power of tyrannical commoners. Fiercely rebuking his opponents, Rashid Rida declared:

"The best weapon they brandished against him was that he contradicted the majority of Muslims. Who were the majority of Muslims Muhammad Ibn Abdul Wahhab contradicted in his Da'wah? They were Bedouins of the desert, worse than the people of Jahiliyyah, intent on looting and theft. They allowed shedding the blood of Muslims and non-Muslims, just to earn a living. They took their tyrants as judges in every matter and denied many aspects of Islam on which there is consensus [especially among scholars], matters in which no Muslim can claim ignorance."

Ali Bey el Abbassi, a Spanish explorer who was in Mecca in 1803, shortly after the Wahhabi conquest of Hejaz, presented a starkly different view of the Wahhabis. He was surprised to find that they were fairly "moderate, reasonable and civilized". He further observed that, rather than engaging in rampant violence and destruction, the Wahhabis were pleasant and well-organized. According to Ali Bey, there were major differences in the political approach of Muhammad ibn Saud Al Muqrin, and that of his son, Abdulaziz bin Muhammad Al Saud, during whose reign Ibn Abd al-Wahhab was retired from active public life. Ali Bey asserts that unlike the fair-minded Muhammad Ibn Saud; his son 'Abd Al-Azeez began employing a "convert or die" approach for the acquirment of wealth and stabilising the state. Ali Bey writes in his Travels:

"I discovered much reason and moderation among the Wehhabites to whom I spoke, and from whom I obtained the greater part of the information which I have given concerning their nation..... The reformer Abdoulwehhab did not invest himself with any honour or public character: he was only the chief of the sect, and did not require any personal distinction. After his death, his son, who succeeded him, preserved the same simplicity."

British diplomat Harford Jones-Brydges, who was stationed in Basra in 1784 attributed the popular hysteria about the Wahhabis to a different cause. Unlike Ottoman depictions, Brydges believed that Ibn Abd al-Wahhab's doctrine was in keeping with the teachings of Quran, was "perfectly orthodox", "consonant to the purest and best interpretations of that volume", and that Ottomans feared its spread precisely on that basis.

The Egyptian historian and Azhari Islamic scholar Abd al-Rahman al-Jabarti (1753–1825 C.E) was a great admirer of Ibn ʿAbd al-Wahhab and his movement. He defended his doctrines in Egypt and held the movement in high regard, viewing its doctrines as having a great prospective to spearhead future Islamic revival. Al-Jabarti had the chance to personally meet with various Wahhabi scholars in Egypt in 1814. Finding them to be friendly and knowledgeable, Al-Jabarti stated that the Wahhabis were "modest men of good morals, well trained in oratory, in the principles of religion, the branches of fiqh, and the disagreements of the Schools of Law. In all this they were extraordinary." He described Ibn Abd al-Wahhab as a man who "summoned men to Qur'an and the Prophet's Sunna, bidding them to abandon innovations in worship". Through his writings, Al-Jabarti repeatedly stressed that the beliefs and doctrines championed by Ibn Abd al-Wahhab were nothing other than orthodox Sunni Islam.

Moroccan military leader 'Abd al-Karim al-Khattabi (1882-1963 C.E) praised Ibn Abd al-Wahhab's reform endeavour as a "promising voice" that sparked spiritual and intellectual Awakening across the Islamic World.

Prominent Syrian Hanbali scholar 'Abd al-Qadir ibn Badran (1864-1927 C.E/ 1280-1346 A.H) praised the efforts of Muhammad ibn Abd al-Wahhab in his treatise Al-Madkhal ila Madhhab il-Imam Ahmad ibn Hanbal (An Introduction to the Madhab of Imam Ahmad ibn Hanbal), writing:

"When he [i.e, Ibn 'Abd al Wahhab] learned the narrations and the Sunnah and became expertised in the madhab of Ahmad; he began supporting the Truth, fighting bid'ah and resisting what illiterates have made part of this monotheistic religion and Sharia of moderation. Some people supported him and made their worship solely to The One God following his path, which was to establish pure Tawhid, call sincerely to monotheism and direct worship in all of its forms solely to The Creator of creation alone. Some people resisted him; they were used to rigidity in following what their forefathers did and they armoured themselves with laziness instead of seeking the truth."

=== Modern reception ===
Various academics have compared Muhammad ibn Abd al-Wahhab to the 15th-century German Christian pastor Martin Luther, for their efforts in launching socio-religious movements that challenged the authority of the dominant clerical and political hierarchy of their societies. Despite being adherents of different religions; both of them were inspired by their respective idealised visions of the past and shared similar themes such as the social and economic upliftment of their societies empowered through mass-education enabled by campaigns for open access to Scriptures. He is honoured by many scholars of the Salafi tradition as a juristic authority and source of reference. Salafi scholars Rashid Rida and Ibn Baz considered him a mujaddid. Salafi scholar Al-Albani (d. 1999) praised him for his dawah movement in the Najd while also criticizing him for having a "level of exaggeration and harshness", as well as being "weak in hadith and jurisprudence". He asserted that Ibn Abd al-Wahhab was not a mujtahid in fiqh, accusing him of imitating the Hanbali school, and also challenged Ibn Abd al-Wahhab's credentials in the knowledge of hadith.

According to the 20th-century Austro-Hungarian scholar Muhammad Asad, all modern Islamic Renaissance movements took inspiration from the spiritual impetus set in motion in the 18th century by Muhammad Ibn Abd al-Wahhab. Crediting Ibn Abd al-Wahhab for his contributions to Islamic Renaissance and spread of revolutionary ideals across the Muslim world, Tunisian Islamist intellectual Rached Gannouchi writes:

"Just as in the West in the age of Renaissance, the Muslim world was stirred by a great awakening. Muhammad bin Abd al-Wahhab's message of jihad and ijtihad inspired an unbroken movement... to push the umma towards jihad against its enemies, to abandon the guise of tradition (taqlid) and to unite its divisions around the mystical origins of Islam and Islamic thought."

Scholars of the Deobandi movement have held ambiguous views on Muhammad ibn Abd al-Wahhab. Rashid Ahmad Gangohi, one of the founders of the Deobandi school praised Ibn Abd al-Wahhab as a virtuous scholar who upheld the Sunnah and campaigned against polytheistic and superstitious beliefs and practices. Senior Deobandi scholar Manzur Numani penned the treatise "Sheikh Muhammad bin Abdul Wahhab ke Khilaf Propaganda" (The Propaganda against Sheikh Muhammad bin Abdul Wahhab) in defense of Ibn Abd al-Wahhab.

However, other Deobandi scholars harshly criticized Ibn Abd al-Wahhab. Anwar Shah Kashmiri considered him a "dull minded person with little knowledge". In Al-Shihab al-Thaqib, Hussain Ahmad Madani called Ibn Abd al-Wahhab a "tyrant, rebel and blood spilling transgressor". Mahmud Hasan Gangohi believed Ibn Abd al-Wahhab was initially a follower of the Sunnah, though later changed his objective to seize political power. Mahmud Ganhohi also claimed that Rashid Ahmad Gangohi had recanted his previous positive statements about Ibn Abd al-Wahhab when he read Ibn Abidin's refutation Radd al-Muhtar against Ibn Abd al-Wahhab.

Islamic scholar Yusuf Al-Qārādawī praised Muhammad ibn 'Abd al-Wahhab as a Mujaddid (religious reviver) of the Arabian Peninsula who defended the purity of Tawhid from various superstitions and polytheistic beliefs. Praising Ibn 'Abd al-Wahhab's efforts, Muhammad Rashīd Ridá wrote:

"Muhammad bin Abd al-Wahhab al-Najdi was one of those Mujaddids, [who] called for the upholding of Tawhid and the sincerity of worship to God alone with what He legislated in His Book and on the tongue of His Messenger, the Seal of the Prophets; ... abandoning heresies and sins, establishing the abandoned rituals of Islam, and venerating its violated sanctities."

In his book "Saviours of the Islamic Spirit", Islamic scholar Abul Hasan Ali Nadwi (1913-1999 C.E) acclaimed Ibn 'Abd al-Wahhab as a "great reformer" who called his people to Tawhid, revived injunctions based on Qur'an and Sunnah and eradicated superstitious rites prevalent amongst the illiterate masses of Central Arabia. Nadwi compared his movement to that of the contemporary South Asian Islamic revivalist Shah Waliullah Dehlawi (1703-1762 C.E/ 1114-1176 A.H) who had expounded similar ideas such as differentiating between Tawhid-i-Uluhiyyat (Oneness of Worship) and Tawhid-i-Rububiyat (Oneness of Lordship) and promotion of strict adherence to Qur'an and Hadith. In Nadwi's opinion, Ibn Abd al-Wahhab was able to make outstanding efforts with far-reaching impact compared to other contemporary reformers since he played the role of a revolutionary reformer whose initiatives were implemented through a newly established Islamic state and thus his movement was highly pertinent for the people of his time.

Professor Satoru Nakamura of Kobe University believed that sectarian clerics were the first to initiate Takfir (excommunication) and sanction bloodshed against the followers of Ibn Abd al-Wahhab, forcing Ibn Abd al-Wahhab to launch a defensive Jihad, citing religious justifications in line with the principles of Islamic Wasitiyya. In 2010, Prince Salman bin Abdulaziz, at the time serving as the governor of Riyadh, said that the doctrine of Muhammad Ibn Abd al-Wahhab was pure Islam, and said regarding his works:

"I dare anyone to bring a single alphabetical letter from the Sheikh's books that goes against the book of Allah and the teachings of his prophet, Muhammad."

=== Western reception ===
During the early 21st century Western security discourse, Muhammad Ibn Abd al-Wahhab's movement, Wahhabism, was often associated with various Jihadi movements across the Islamic World. Various Western analysts claimed that the pan-Islamist militant organization al-Qaeda were influenced by the Wahhabi doctrine. Other scholars note that the ideology of al-Qaeda is Salafi jihadism that emerged as a synthesis of the Qutbist doctrine with Salafism. Western media often conflated Deobandi Jihadists of Taliban in Afghanistan with Wahhabis in the early 2000s; despite the fact that Taliban adhered to the doctrines of the Hanafi Deobandi movement. According to other sources, Salafis are fundamentally opposed to the ideology of Al-Qaeda. According to various Western media outlets, the ideology of Islamic State, a Salafi Jihadist militant organization, has also been inspired by Wahhabi doctrines, alongside Salafism, Qutbism, and Salafi jihadism.

During the early years of post-9/11 hysteria, FBI had designated al-Qaeda as "the number one terrorist threat to the United States" and the neo-cons in the Bush Administration were able to incite hysterical narratives of "Wahhabism" through their expanded influence in politics and Western media. Neo-conservative journalist Lulu Schwartz and former U.S. Senator and Republican politician Jon Kyl claimed before a U.S. Senate Judiciary Subcommittee in June 2003 that "Wahhabism is the source of the overwhelming majority of terrorist atrocities in today's world". Their recommendations would become influential in Bush Administration's agenda for its "Global War on Terrorism".

On the other hand, contemporary Western historians and researchers have taken a more nuanced approach on the history and evolution of the "Wahhabi" movement; pointing out the discrepancy between the Ibn 'Abd al-Wahhab's teachings, some of his later followers and the actions of contemporary militant Jihadist groups. Various scholars assert that many writings of Ibn 'Abd al-Wahhab were revised during the 19th century by authorities of the Second Saudi State; transforming them away from a poetic-vernacular style of communication with mass appeal to a more rigid and purist understanding that aligned with the interests of the ruling class and the clerical establishment. David E. Long believes that modern Jihadist movements are more influenced by the ideological worldview of Egyptian Islamist extremism of the 20th century, rather than Ibn 'Abd al-Wahhab's socio-religious reformism. Although many Salafi-Jihadists maybe inspired by Wahhabi ideals, it doesn't credibly explain their inclinations towards lethal violence.

the development of the hadith, whose importance cannot be overemphasized, incorporated dynamism into the very heart of Islam. When Ibn 'Abd al-Wahhab criticized local customs in Arabia on the basis of their incongruence with the past he was indeed trying to get back to a former golden age, but that is a very modern thing to do... What the Wahhabis were doing was to criticize current society and seek to undermine the existing order, something that the earlier Ibn Taymiyya fell foul of when for having similar views he was tortured and threatened with death.

— Oliver Leaman, Professor of Philosophy at the University of Kentucky

Western scholars like Michael Ryan assert that Ibn 'Abd al-Wahhab's reformist teachings were a rationalist enterprise that sought to eradicate superstitions widespread in the context of tribal rivalry within the Arabian Peninsula. Moreover, the regional background of Ibn 'Abd al-Wahhab's intellectual efforts in the chaotic context of the 18th-century Arabian Peninsula had been distinct from the 21st century global Jihad ideology of organisations like Al-Qaeda or IS. Consequently, his scholarly heirs, including the prestigious Aal al-Shaykhs constitute the primary ideological nemesis of groups such as al-Qaeda. Since the Saudi population overwhelmingly prefers their traditional religious institutions and scholars to Bin Laden's claims to revolutionary Jihadi-Salafism; Al-Qaeda harshly attacks these mainstream Saudi clerics with much rhetorical vitriol.

Various scholars have also contested Orientalist portrayals of Wahhabi movement as "ultra-conservative" or "stagnant", noting its dynamic nature and capability of multiple interpretations. Professor Satoru Nakamura of Kobe University has criticized Orientalist scholars who depicted Ibn 'Abd al-Wahhab as a slavish imitator of Ibn Taymiyya, without studying the scholar's vast works and analysing historical nuances. Contemporary academic research in the Islamic studies field has found that Ibn 'Abd al-Wahhab's scholarly methodology were based on the moderation of "Islamic Middle Way" (Wasitiyya).

== Contemporary recognition ==
Muhammad ibn Abd al-Wahhab's thoughts would greatly influence the pan-Islamic movement of the 19th century. The national mosque of Qatar is named after him. The "Imam Muhammad ibn Abd al-Wahhab Mosque" was opened in 2011, with the Emir of Qatar presiding over the occasion. The mosque has the capacity to host a congregation of 30,000 people. In 2017, there was a request published in the Saudi Arabian newspaper Okaz signed by 200 descendants of Ibn Abd al-Wahhab that the name of the mosque be changed, because according to their statement "it does not carry its true Salafi path", even though most Qataris adhere to Wahhabism.

The Turaif district in Diriyah, the capital of the First Saudi state, was declared a UNESCO World Heritage Site in 2010. In 2011, Saudi Arabia announced its plans for large-scale development of Ibn 'Abd al-Wahhab's domain Diriyah; to establish a national cultural site in Diriyah and turn it into a major tourist attraction. Other features in the area include the Sheikh Muhammad bin Abdul Wahab Foundation, which is planned to include a light and sound presentation located near the Mosque of Sheikh Mohammad bin Abdulwahab.

== Works ==
Ibn 'Abd al-Wahhab has been described as a "prolific writer" whose scholarly treatises are collected into fourteen large volumes; which consists of various legal books, Qur'anic commentaries, creedal works, and compilation of fatwas. Some of his major works include:

- Risālah Aṣlu Dīn al-Islām wa Qāʿidatuhu (The Foundation and Principles of Islam)
- Kitāb Tafsīr li-Baʿḍ Suwar al-Qurʾān (A Commentary on Some Surahs of the Qurʾan)
- Kitāb at-Tawḥīd (The Book of the Oneness of God)
- Kashf al-Shubuhāt (Clarification of the Doubts)
- Thalāthatu’l-Uṣūl (The Three Fundamental Principles)
- al-Usūl al-Thalāthah (A concise version of Thalāthatu’l-Uṣūl which is aimed for junior students)
- al-Qawāʿid al-Arbaʿ (The Four Foundations)
- al-Uṣūl al-Sittah (The Six Fundamental Principles)
- Nawāqiḍ al-Islām (Nullifiers of Islam)
- Ādāb al-Mashy ilā al-Ṣalāh (Manners of Walking to the Prayer)
- Uṣūl al-Īmān (Foundations of Faith)
- Faḍāʾil al-Islam (Excellent Virtues of Islam)
- Faḍāʾil al-Qurʾān (Excellent Virtues of the Qur'an)
- Majmūʿ al-Ḥadīth ʿalā Abwāb al-Fiqh (Compendium of the Hadith on the Main Topics of the Fiqh)
- Mukhtaṣar al-ʾImān (Abridgement of the Faith; i.e. the summarised version of a work on Faith)
- Mukhtaṣar al-Insāf wa’l-Sharḥ al-Kabīr (An abridgement of the Equity and the Great Explanation)
- Mukhtaṣar Sīrat al-Rasūl (An abridged Biography of the Messenger)
- Kitāb al-Kabāʾir (The Book of Great Sins)
- al-Radd ʿalā al-Rafida (The Refutation of the Rejectionists)
- Mukhtaṣar al-Ṣawāʿiq al-Mursalāh ʿalā al-Jahmiyyah wa al-Muʿaṭṭilah (An abridgment of the Thunderbolts Sent Against the Jahmiyyah and the Negators)

== See also ==
- Ibn Taymiyya
- Wahhabi Movement
- Emirate of Diriyah
- International propagation of Salafism and Wahhabism

== Sources ==
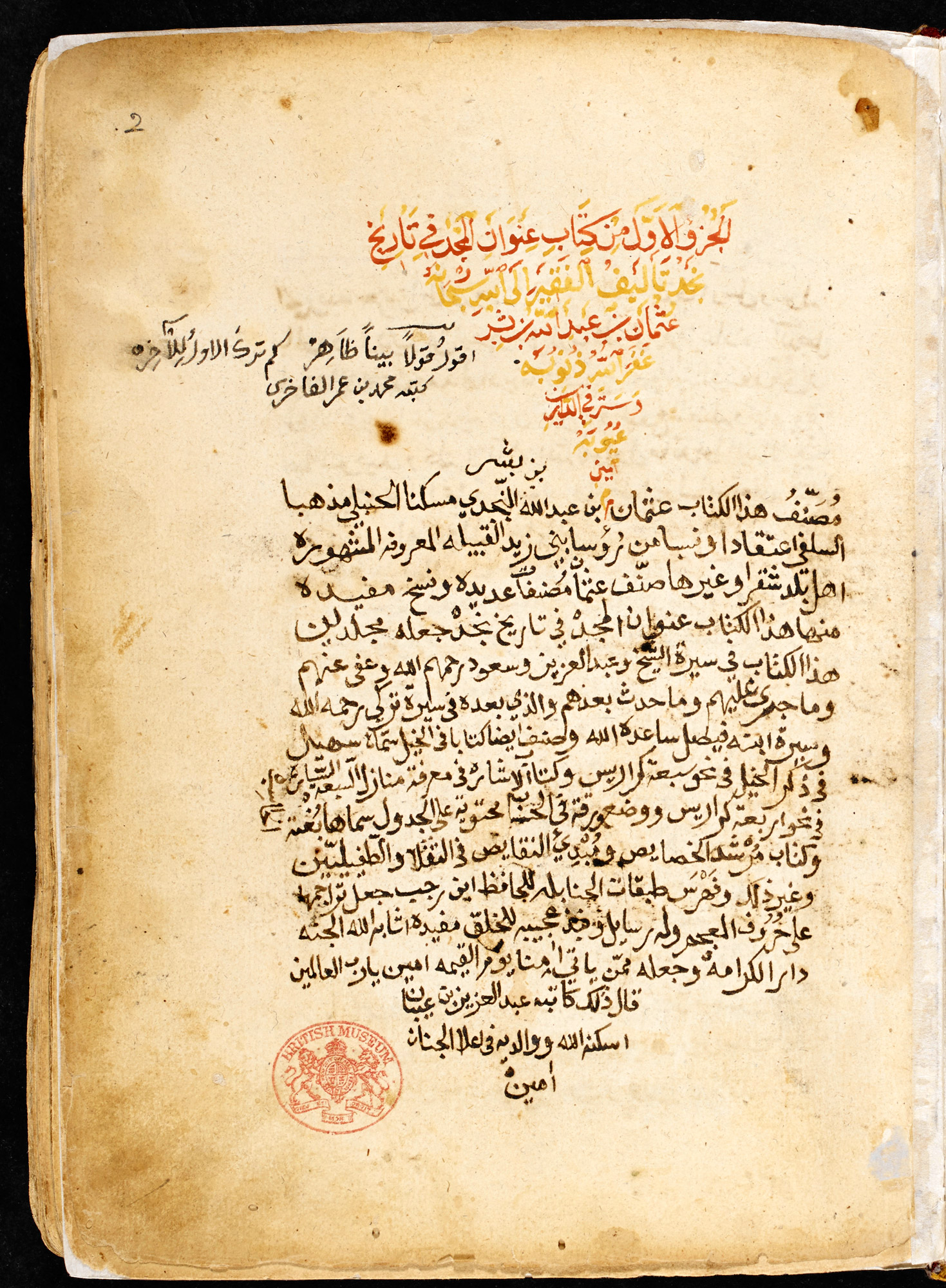
Unwan al-Majd fi Tarikh al-Najd by chronicler Uthman ibn 'Abdullah Ibn Bishr

Two of the earliest sources for the biography of Muhammad ibn 'Abd al-Wahhab and early history of the Wahhabi movement have been documented by its followers:

- Wahhabi chronicler and scholar Ibn Ghannam's Rawdhat al-Afkar wal-Afham or Tarikh Najd (History of Najd) and Husain ibn Ghannam (d. 1811), an alim from al-Hasa was the only historian to have observed the beginnings of Ibn Abd al-Wahhab's movement first-hand. His chronicle ends at the year 1797.
- Najdi Historian Ibn Bishr's Unwan al-Majd fi Tarikh Najd (The Glorious History of Najd). Ibn Bishr's chronicle, which stops at the year 1854, was written a generation later than Ibn Ghannam's but is considered valuable partly because Ibn Bishr was a native of Najd and because he adds many details to Ibn Ghannam's account.

A third account, covering Arabian history between the 1730s to 1817 is Lam' al-Shihab (The Brilliance of the Meteor) written by an anonymous author who respectfully disapproved of Ibn ʿAbd al-Wahhab's movement, regarding it as a bid'ah (heresy).

It is also commonly cited in Orientalist circles because it is considered to be a relatively objective and unofficial treatment of the subject. However, unlike Ibn Ghannam and Ibn Bishr, its author did not live in Najd and his work contains various tales, apocryphal and legendary materials concerning the details of Ibn ʿAbd al-Wahhab's life.
