= Sulayman ibn Ali ibn Musharraf =

Sheikh of the Hanbalis in the Najdi Lands Sulayman ibn Ali ibn Musharraf

Personal life
- Born: c. 1586 (995 AH) Ushayqir, Najd, Arabia
- Died: 1668 (1079 AH) Al-Uyayna, Najd, Arabia
- Spouse: Sister of Muhammad ibn Abd al-Wahhab ibn Fayruz; Fatima bint Ahmad al-Bassam
- Children: Ibrahim ibn Sulayman ibn Ali; Abd al-Wahhab ibn Sulayman
- Parents: Ali ibn Ahmad (father); Khadija bint Sultan (mother)
- Occupation: Qadi, Theologian, Jurist

Religious life
- Religion: Islam
- Denomination: Sunni
- School: Hanbali
- Creed: Athari

Sulayman ibn Ali ibn Muhammad ibn Musharraf al-Tamimi al-Najdi al-Hanbali (c. 1586 – 1668 CE / 995 – 1079 AH), commonly known as Ibn Musharraf, was a preeminent Hanbali jurist, theologian, and the Chief Judge (Qadi) of the Najd region during the 17th century. He is widely regarded as one of the most influential scholars of his era in the Arabian Peninsula. Sulayman was the father of the scholar Abd al-Wahhab ibn Sulayman and the grandfather of Muhammad ibn Abd al-Wahhab, the founder of the Wahhabi movement. His scholarly lineage and judicial rulings played a foundational role in the intellectual and religious landscape of central Arabia prior to the rise of the First Saudi State.

== Lineage ==
Sulayman ibn Ali belonged to the Musharraf branch of the Banu Tamim, a prominent Arab tribe with a long history of settlement in the Najd. His full genealogy is recorded as Sulayman ibn Ali ibn Muhammad ibn Ahmad ibn Rashid ibn Burayd ibn Musharraf ibn Umar ibn Ma'dad ibn Rayyis ibn Zakhar ibn Muhammad ibn Alawi ibn Wuhaib al-Tamimi al-Najdi al-Hanbali.

== Early life ==
He was born in the town of Ushaiger around 1586 (995 AH). During this period, Ushayqir was a major center of learning for the Hanbali school of jurisprudence in central Arabia, often referred to as the "cradle of scholars." Sulayman grew up in a scholarly environment, as his family was known for producing numerous jurists and judges. He began his education at a young age, memorizing the Quran and studying the fundamentals of the Arabic language and Islamic law under the tutelage of local scholars, including his relatives.

== Teachers ==
Sulayman ibn Ali sought knowledge from the most distinguished scholars of his time in Najd. His education focused heavily on the Hanbali school of law, which was the dominant legal tradition in the region. His primary mentors included:

- Ahmad ibn Muhammad ibn Musharraf (d. 1603 / 1012 AH): A relative and early mentor who provided him with a strong foundation in religious sciences.
- Muhammad ibn Ahmad ibn Isma'il (d. 1649 / 1059 AH): Under his guidance, Sulayman mastered Tafsir (exegesis), Hadith, Fiqh (jurisprudence), and Fara'id (laws of inheritance).

== Education ==
Sulayman was particularly noted for his exceptional mastery of Hanbali jurisprudence. Contemporary accounts describe him as a "prodigy of his age" in legal matters, possessing a deep understanding of the complexities of the school's texts and the ability to derive legal rulings for contemporary issues.

== Judicial Career ==
Sulayman's reputation for legal expertise led to his appointment as a judge. He initially served as the Qadi of Rawdat Sudair, where he gained prominence for his fairness and deep knowledge of the law. Later, he moved to Al-Uyayna, which was then one of the most powerful and prosperous principalities in Najd.

In Al-Uyayna, he served as the Chief Judge and religious authority. His tenure was marked by significant influence over the social and legal affairs of the region. He was frequently consulted by other judges and scholars across Najd to resolve difficult legal disputes, making him the de facto supreme religious authority of the province during the mid-17th century.

== Works ==
Sulayman ibn Ali authored several works that became essential references for Hanbali students in Najd. His writings are characterized by clarity, precision, and a focus on practical application. His most notable works include:

1. Misbah al-Salik fi Ahkam al-Manasik (The Traveler's Lamp regarding the Rulings of Rituals): A comprehensive manual on the rites of Hajj and Umrah. This work is highly regarded for its concise yet thorough explanation of pilgrimage rituals according to the Hanbali school.
2. Fatawa al-Musharraf (The Musharraf Fatwas): A collection of legal opinions and rulings on various aspects of Islamic law, ranging from transactions to family law.
3. Sharh al-Iqna (Commentary on Al-Iqna): A detailed commentary on Al-Iqna li-Talib al-Intifa, one of the most authoritative manuals of Hanbali jurisprudence written by al-Hujjawi. Sulayman's commentary helped clarify complex passages and provided contemporary context for the rulings.

== Students ==
As a leading scholar, Sulayman ibn Ali trained a generation of jurists who would go on to shape the religious history of Arabia. His students included his own sons and several other prominent figures:

- Abd al-Wahhab ibn Sulayman (d. 1740 / 1153 AH): His son, who succeeded him as a prominent judge and scholar, and the father of Muhammad ibn Abd al-Wahhab.
- Ibrahim ibn Sulayman (d. 1728 / 1141 AH): Another son who was a recognized scholar in his own right.
- Muhammad ibn Sulayman: His eldest son, who died in the early 12th century AH.
- Abu Numay ibn Abdullah: The author of Al-Mansak, a well-known treatise on Hajj.
- Ahmad ibn Muhammad al-Qusayr (d. 1712 / 1124 AH): A notable jurist who spread Sulayman's teachings in the Sudair region.
- Mani' ibn Muhammad al-Dawsari (d. 1722 / 1134 AH).

== Legacy ==
Sulayman's legacy is most visible in the continued prominence of his descendants, the Al ash-Sheikh family, who have remained the leading religious authority in Saudi Arabia for over two centuries. His emphasis on the Hanbali tradition and his judicial methodology provided the intellectual framework within which his grandson, Muhammad ibn Abd al-Wahhab, was later educated.

== Death ==
Sulayman ibn Ali passed away in the city of Al-Uyayna in 1668 (1079 AH). His death was mourned throughout Najd, and he was remembered as the "Sheikh of the Hanbalis" and a pillar of Islamic scholarship in the region.
