= Sulayman ibn Abd al-Wahhab =

18th-century Islamic scholar and Hanbali jurist

Sulaymān ibn ‘Abd al-Wahhāb سليمان بن عبد الوهاب

Personal life
- Born: 1699 Al-‘Uyainah, Najd
- Died: 17 February 1794 (aged 94–95) Huraymila
- Era: Early modern period (Early Saudi era)
- Region: Arabian Peninsula
- Main interests: ‘Aqīdah (Islamic theology); Fiqh (Islamic jurisprudence)
- Notable work(s): The Unmistakable Judgment in the Refutation of Muhammad ibn 'Abd al-Wahhab (Arabic: فصل الخطاب في الرد على محمد بن عبد الوهاب; "Faṣl al-Khiṭāb fī Al-radd 'alā Muḥammad ibn ‘Abd al-Wahhāb")

Religious life
- Religion: Islam
- Denomination: Sunni
- Jurisprudence: Ḥanbalī
- Creed: Atharī

Muslim leader
- Influenced by: Ahmad ibn Hanbal, Sulayman ibn Ali ibn Musharraf

Imam Sulaymān ibn ‘Abd al-Wahhāb at-Tamīmī (Note: Also written as Sulaiman ibn 'Abdul-Wahhab and Sulaiman bin Abdul Wahab al-Najdi al-Hanbali) (Arabic: سُليمان بن عبدالوهّاب التميمي) was an Islamic scholar, Hanbali jurist, and theologian from the Najd region in central Arabia. He was the elder brother of Muhammad ibn Abd al-Wahhab, the founder of the Wahhabi movement, and he was one of the first critics of his brother and the Wahhabi movement. He regarded his brothers teachings as heretical, and some accounts suggest that he was among the first to use the word "Wahhabi" to refer to his brother's doctrine in his alleged treatise The Unmistakable Judgment in the Refutation of Muhammad ibn 'Abd al-Wahhab.

Their dispute became associated with armed conflict between Huraymila, and the Najdi historian Hussayn ibn Ghannam, a supporter of Muhammed ibn Abd al-Wahhabs's movement, chronicled the conflict between the two brothers in his book, which was printed by Abdel Mohsen Aba Bateen in Egypt in 1368 AH. Abdullah bin Abdul Rahman bin Saleh Al Bassam mentions him in his book "Scholars of Najd during eight centuries" in which he says "Sheikh Suleiman is in breach of his brother Sheikh Muhammad and his call and is hostile to it and a response to it."

== Early life ==
Sulayman was born in the town of 'Uyayna when his father was a judge there. He learned under the tutelage of his father and others, proceeding to complete his legal education in Huraymila at the hands of his father and other scholars of his time, especially in Fiqh. Sulayman succeeded his father in the Huraymila district, and he took his place after his death in 1153 AH. Sulayman bin Abd al-Wahhab was older than his brother Muhammad, who studied with him as he studied with his father Abd al-Wahhab. Sulayman bin Abd al-Wahhab, was described by his contemporaries as a reliable reference for scholars, and a reliable reference for the general public, and was known for his knowledge, reason, piety and sincerity. The historian Ibn Bishr described him in his history as one of the scholars, judges, and jurists of knowledge.

== Major works and opposition to Wahhabism ==
Eight years after the start of the Wahhabi movement, Sulayman sent a detailed letter addressed to Hassan bin Idan, which later was dubbed by publishers as "Separating the speech in response to Muhammad bin Abdul-Wahhab" This book was mentioned in the book al-Suhub al-Wabila 'ala Dara'ih al-Hanabila (The Torrential Rainclouds over the Graves of the Hanbalis) by the scholar Muhammad bin Abdullah bin Hamid Al-Najdi Al-Hanbali. The book is in the Al-Azhar library where they keep a manuscript copy of it under the title: “Responding to those who disbelieve Muslims due to vowing to others but God and seeking help from others and so on.” There is another copy with the same address in the Public Endowments Library in Baghdad. It appears that Suleiman bin Abd al-Wahhab did not name his book or rather he did not intend to write a book at all, as they were lengthy letters in which he responded to his brother's teachings, and that manuscript has spread without a title, so different titles were formulated according to the place and time, according to the publisher, and according to the directions.

One of the titles under which the work circulated was al-Sawa'iq al-Ilahiyyah fi al-Radd 'ala al-Wahhabiyyah (Arabic: الصواعق الإلهية في الرد على الوهابية; "Divine Thunderbolts in Refutation of Wahhabism"). In the work, Sulayman critized his brother's classification of certain religious practices such as invoking saints, making vows to the deceased, and certain practices associated with graves as major shirk (polytheism). Citing Hanbali scholars, Sulayman argued that some of these practices could be prohibited or constitute only minor shirk without neccesarily amounting to apostacy. He also challenged his brother's interpretation of Islamic legal texts and accused his brother's movement of excommunicating professing Muslims and their communities (takfir).

Sulayman's criticism drew on the writings of earlier Hanbali scholars, particularly Ibn Taymiyya and Ibn al-Qayyim, to support his arguments. He argued that certain religious practices did not necessarily constitute apostacy and that ignorance, misunderstanding, and the establishment of religious proof had to be considered before declaring an individual an unbeliever. His opposition also extended beyond Huraymila; in 1754, he sent a critical letter to be read in publicily in al-Uyayna, to which Muhammed ibn Abd al-Wahhab wrote a response. Other Najdi scholars also criticized Mohammed ibn Abd al-Wahhabs's teachings.

== See also ==
- Ahmad Zayni Dahlan
