= Uyayna =

Uyayna الْعُيَيْنة
- Village
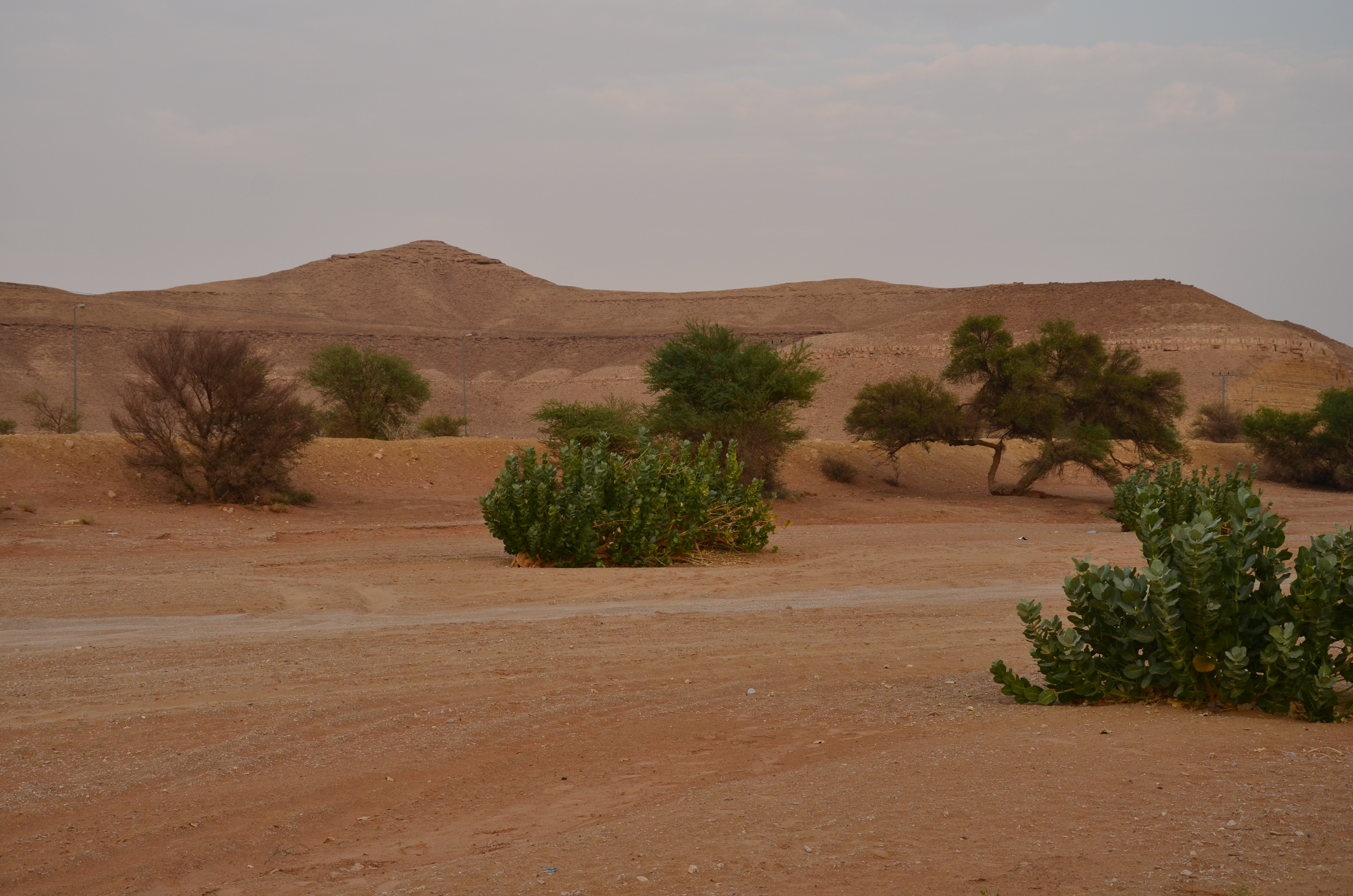

- Location within Saudi Arabia
- Coordinates: 24°54′19″N 46°23′29″E
- Country: Saudi Arabia
- Province: Riyadh Province
- Governorate: Diriyah

Uyayna (Arabic: الْعُيَيْنة, romanized: al-ʿUyayna) is a village in central Saudi Arabia, located some 30 km (19 mi) northwest of the Saudi capital Riyadh. Uyayna was the birthplace of Muhammad ibn Abd al-Wahhab. Today, Uyayna is a small village and forms together with its neighbor al-Jubayla the Subgovernorate of Uyayna and Al-Jubayla, with a combined population of 4,000. The subgovernorate is part of the Governorate of Dir'iyyah, which in turn is part of Riyadh Province.

== Location ==
Uyayna is located inside the narrow, dry river-bed of Wadi Hanifa, which continues southwards through Dir'iyyah and Riyadh. The area where Uyayna is located was the homeland of Musaylima, who claimed to be a prophet following Muhammad's death in 632, and led his tribe, the Banu Hanifa, against the Muslim conquest of the area. The Battle of Yamama between Musaylima and the Muslim general Khalid ibn al-Walid occurred nearby, and a graveyard for the fallen Muslim warriors from that battle is located adjacent to the village.

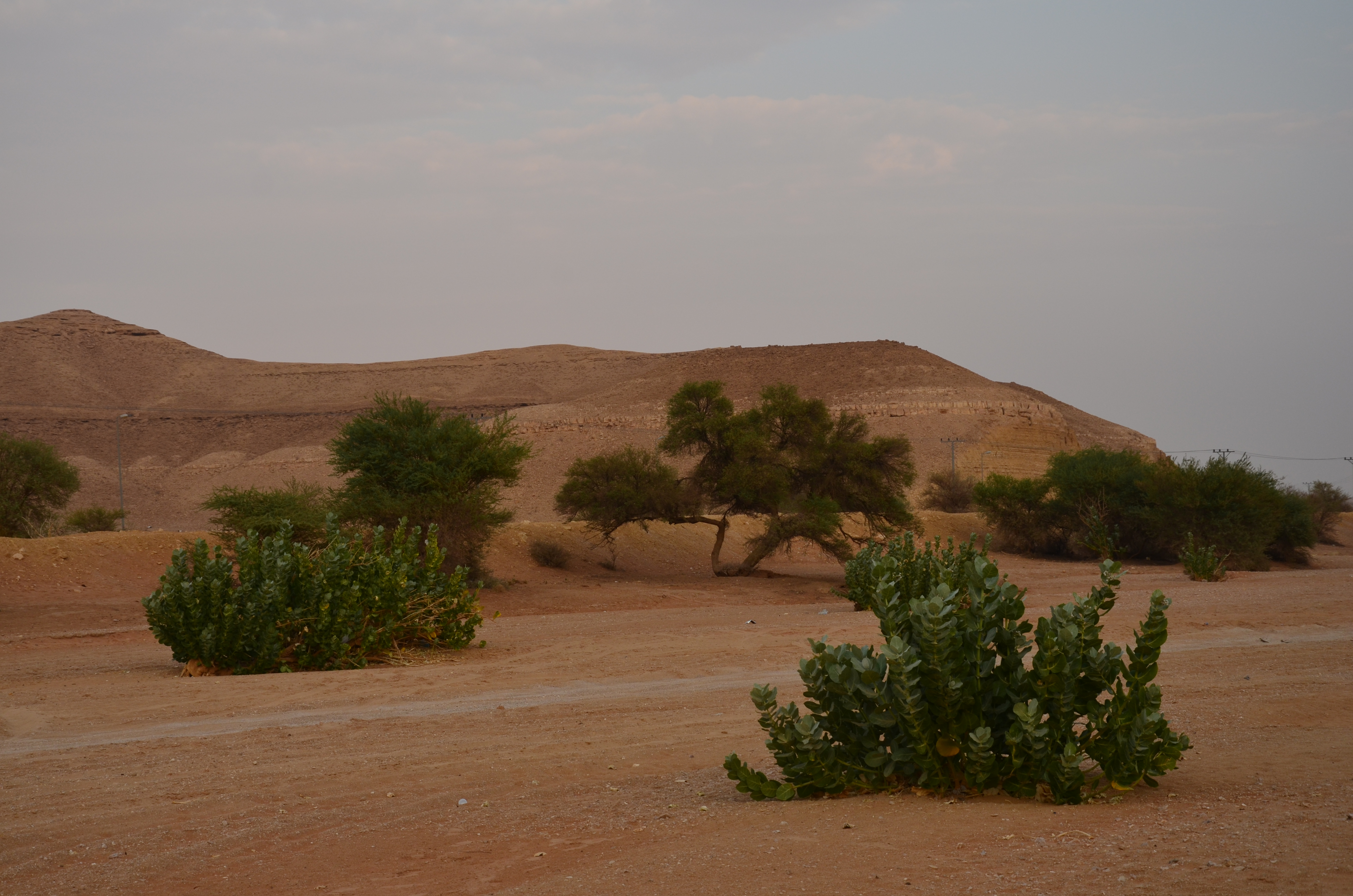
Uyayna

== The origin of its name ==
The name Uyayna, which is the diminutive word for "ain", meaning "water spring", was not used for the settlements in the area in that period. Instead, early Muslim geographic sources, such as Yaqut, mention the towns of 'Aqraba, Budha, and al-Haddar, the latter said to be Musaylima's home village. Geographic sources do, however, mention, a spring in the area by the name of "al-Uyaynh", from which the name "al-Uyayna" probably derives.

== History ==
In the 15th century, the Al Mu'ammar clan of the tribe of Banu Tamim purchased Uyayna from its previous owners, the clan of Al Yazid, who are said to be a remnant of the Banu Hanifa. Later on the town prospered considerably and attracted many settlers from the vicinity, and by the 18th century had become the leading town of the region of Nejd (central Arabia). The Islamic scholar and religious reformer, Muhammad ibn Abd al-Wahhab, was born in Uyayna during this period. After extensive travels, Ibn Abd al-Wahhab returned to Uyayna in 1740, and began his call to "purify" local Islamic practice from what he considered to be illegitimate innovations akin to idolatry. In particular, he preached against the veneration of Muslim saints, such as Zayd ibn al-Khattab, the brother of the second Muslim Caliph Omar, whose tomb was located in Uyayna and was venerated by locals. Ibn Abd al-Wahhab convinced the emir of Uyayna, Uthman ibn Mu'ammar, to implement his ideas, and the grave of Zayd was levelled. The graveyard which contains Zayd's remains is unmarked and neglected today.

The Banu Khalid tribe, who ruled al-Hasa in eastern Arabia, held considerable influence over Uyayna, and compelled Ibn Mu'ammar to expel Muhammad ibn Abd al-Wahhab from the town in 1744. Ibn Abd al-Wahhab found refuge among the clan of Al Saud in nearby Dir'iyyah, further south. The Saudis set about conquering the surrounding towns and villages in the name of Ibn Abd al-Wahhab's reforms, and during the course of those wars, Uyayna was largely destroyed, especially after an epidemic of the plague had ravaged the town.

Uyayna lay deserted thereafter and was only revived in the 20th century, but remains a very small town. King Abdulaziz Military College, which is in charge of training the officer corps of the Saudi Army, is located in Uyayna.

== Notable people ==
- Musaylima
- Muhammad ibn Abd al-Wahhab
- Sulayman ibn Abd al-Wahhab

== See also ==
- List of cities and towns in Saudi Arabia
- Regions of Saudi Arabia
