= Cold War =

1947–1991 geopolitical rivalry between US and USSR

- 12 March 1947 – 26 December 1991 (Note: Historians do not fully agree on its starting and ending points, but the period is generally considered to span from the announcement of the Truman Doctrine on 12 March 1947 to the dissolution of the USSR on 26 December 1991.)
Aftermath of World War II	Post–Cold War era
- NATO and Warsaw Pact states in 1988
- Duration: 44 years and 9 months Part of the post-World War II era
- Location: Global

The Cold War was a period of international geopolitical rivalry between the United States (US) and the Soviet Union (USSR) and their respective allies, the capitalist Western Bloc and communist Eastern Bloc. It began in the aftermath of the Second World War and ended with the dissolution of the Soviet Union in 1991. The term cold war is used because there was no direct fighting between the two superpowers, though each supported opposing sides in regional conflicts known as proxy wars. In addition to the struggle for ideological and economic influence and an arms race in both conventional and nuclear weapons, the Cold War was expressed through technological rivalries such as the Space Race, espionage, propaganda campaigns, embargoes, and sports diplomacy.

After the end of the Second World War in 1945, during which the US and USSR had been allies, the USSR installed satellite governments in its occupied territories in Eastern Europe and North Korea by 1949, resulting in the political division of Europe (and Germany) by an "Iron Curtain". The USSR tested its first nuclear weapon in 1949, four years after the US used its own on Hiroshima and Nagasaki, and allied with the People's Republic of China, founded in 1949. The US declared the Truman Doctrine of "containment" of communism in 1947, launched the Marshall Plan in 1948 to assist Western Europe's economic recovery, and founded the NATO military alliance in 1949 (matched by the Soviet-led Warsaw Pact in 1955). The Berlin Blockade of 1948 to 1949 was an early confrontation, as was the Korean War of 1950 to 1953, which ended in a stalemate.

US involvement in regime change during the Cold War included support for First World anti-communist and right-wing dictatorships and uprisings, while Soviet involvement included the funding of Second World left-wing parties, wars of independence, and dictatorships. As nearly all the colonial states underwent decolonization, many became Third World battlefields of the Cold War. Both powers used economic aid in an attempt to win the loyalty of non-aligned countries. The Cuban Revolution of 1959 installed the first communist regime in the Western Hemisphere, and in 1962, the Cuban Missile Crisis began after deployments of US missiles in Europe and Soviet missiles in Cuba; it is widely considered the closest the Cold War came to escalating into nuclear war. Another major proxy conflict was the Vietnam War of 1955 to 1975, which ended in a North Vietnamese victory.

The USSR solidified its domination of Eastern Europe with its crushing of the Hungarian Revolution in 1956 and the Warsaw Pact invasion of Czechoslovakia in 1968. Relations between the USSR and China broke down by 1961, with the Sino-Soviet split bringing the two states to the brink of war amid a border conflict in 1969. In 1972, the US initiated diplomatic contacts with China and the US and USSR signed a series of treaties limiting their nuclear arsenals during a period known as détente. In 1979, the toppling of US-allied governments in Iran and Nicaragua and the outbreak of the Soviet–Afghan War again raised tensions. In 1985, Mikhail Gorbachev became leader of the USSR and expanded political freedoms, which contributed to the revolutions of 1989 in the Eastern Bloc and the collapse of the USSR in 1991, ending the Cold War.

== Terminology ==
Writer George Orwell used cold war, as a general term, in his essay "You and the Atomic Bomb", published 19 October 1945. Contemplating a world living in the shadow of the threat of nuclear warfare, Orwell looked at James Burnham's predictions of a polarized world, writing:

Looking at the world as a whole, the drift for many decades has been not towards anarchy but towards the reimposition of slavery... James Burnham's theory has been much discussed, but few people have yet considered its ideological implications—that is, the kind of world-view, the kind of beliefs, and the social structure that would probably prevail in a state which was at once unconquerable and in a permanent state of "cold war" with its neighbours.

In The Observer of 10 March 1946, Orwell wrote, "after the Moscow conference last December, Russia began to make a 'cold war' on Britain and the British Empire."

The first use of the term to describe the specific post-war geopolitical confrontation between the Soviet Union and the United States came in a speech by Bernard Baruch, an influential advisor to Democratic presidents, on 16 April 1947. The speech, written by journalist Herbert Bayard Swope, proclaimed, "we are today in the midst of a cold war." Newspaper columnist Walter Lippmann gave the term wide currency with his book The Cold War. When asked in 1947 about the source of the term, Lippmann traced it to a French term from the 1930s, la guerre froide. (Note: Lippmann's own book is Lippmann, Walter (1947). The Cold War. Harper. ISBN 9780598864048.)

== Background ==
Animosity between the Allies of World War II predated the end of the war. The death of Franklin D. Roosevelt in April 1945 and the changeover to Harry Truman's presidential administration led to changes in US-Soviet relations as Truman and his staff began to take a harder diplomatic line. US and Soviet diplomats disputed conflicting interpretations of agreements made between Stalin and Roosevelt at the Yalta Conference. Truman's administration was divided on the question of the Polish government's composition, with Truman and several cabinet members advocating for stronger demands that broader democratic elements be included in its ranks. A 1944 accord between Churchill and Stalin further complicated matters in Eastern Europe; the two had agreed to non-interference in one another's spheres of influence, in Greece and in Romania and Bulgaria respectively. The creation of the United Nations in the spring of 1945 led to further disagreements over how the postwar international order should be governed. Because of the alignment of many Latin American nations with the United States, the Soviets feared that a pro-American majority would be used against them. They opposed the admission of Argentina into the UN, and called for a more expansive Security Council veto. Stalin ultimately accommodated the American positions on the UN veto and on the Polish government, allowing Oskar Lange and Stanisław Mikołajczyk to join it. The abrupt cancellation of the lend-lease in May and the August atomic bombings in Japan, which took place just days before a planned Soviet entry into the Pacific war, further increased tensions.

== Containment, Truman Doctrine, Korean War (1947–1953) ==
=== Iron Curtain, Iran, Turkey, Greece, and Poland ===
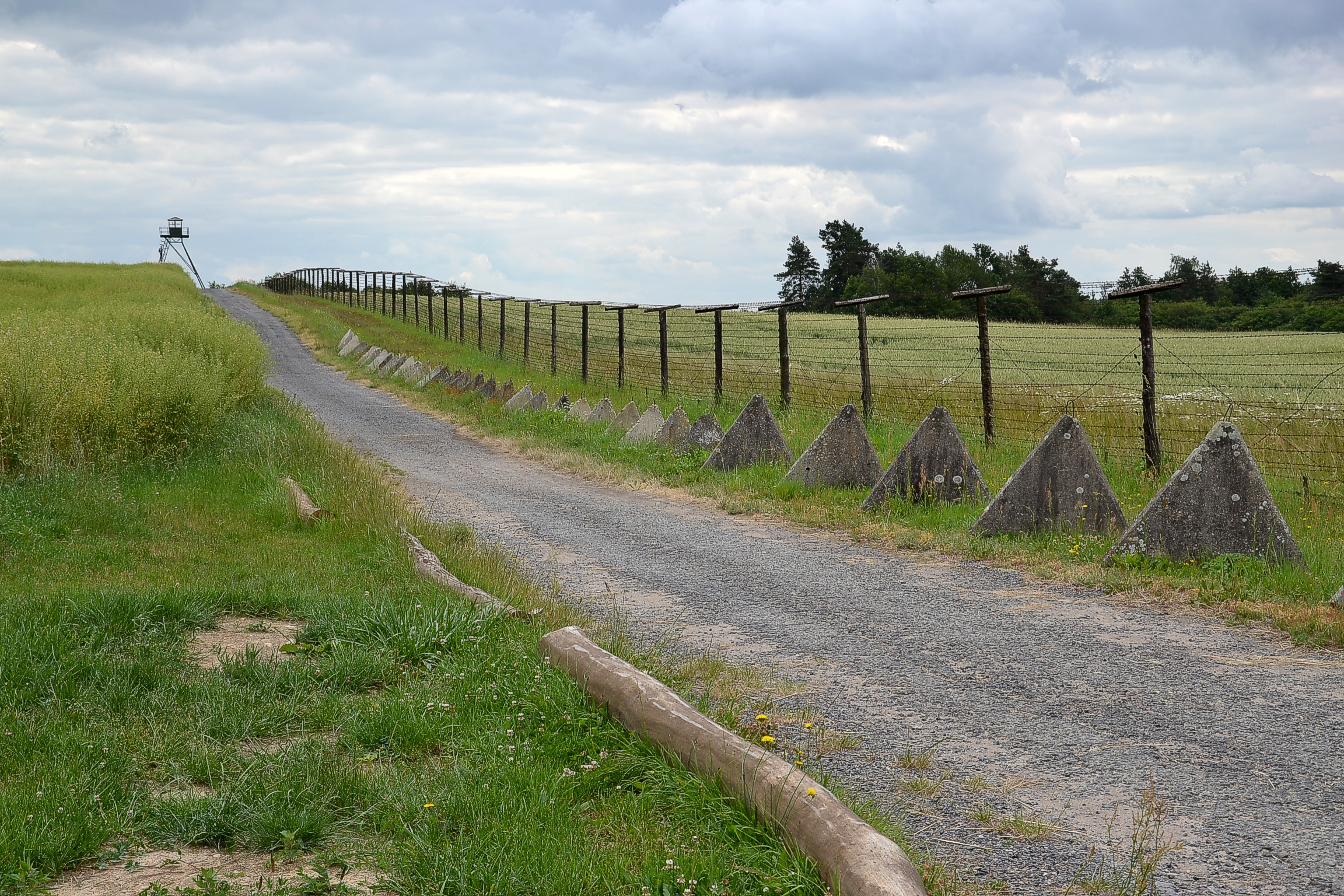
Remains of the "Iron Curtain" in the Czech Republic, 2014

In February 1946, George F. Kennan's "Long Telegram" from Moscow to Washington helped to articulate the US government's increasingly hard line against the Soviets, which would become the basis for US strategy toward the Soviet Union. The telegram galvanized a policy debate that would eventually shape the Truman administration's Soviet policy. Washington's opposition to the Soviets accumulated after broken promises by Stalin and Molotov concerning Europe and Iran. Following the World War II Anglo-Soviet invasion of Iran, the country was occupied by the Red Army in the far north and the British in the south. Iran was used by the United States and British to supply the Soviet Union, and the Allies agreed to withdraw from Iran within six months after the cessation of hostilities. However, when this deadline came, the Soviets remained in Iran under the guise of the Azerbaijan People's Government and Kurdish Republic of Mahabad. On 5 March, former British prime minister Winston Churchill delivered his famous "Iron Curtain" speech (Fulton Speech) calling for an Anglo-American alliance against the Soviets, whom he accused of establishing an "iron curtain" dividing Europe.

A week later, on 13 March, Stalin responded vigorously to the speech, saying Churchill could be compared to Adolf Hitler insofar as he advocated the racial superiority of English-speaking nations so that they could satisfy their hunger for world domination, and that such a declaration was "a call for war on the USSR." The Soviet leader also dismissed the accusation that the USSR was exerting increasing control over the countries lying in its sphere. He argued that there was nothing surprising in "the fact that the Soviet Union, anxious for its future safety, [was] trying to see to it that governments loyal in their attitude to the Soviet Union should exist in these countries."

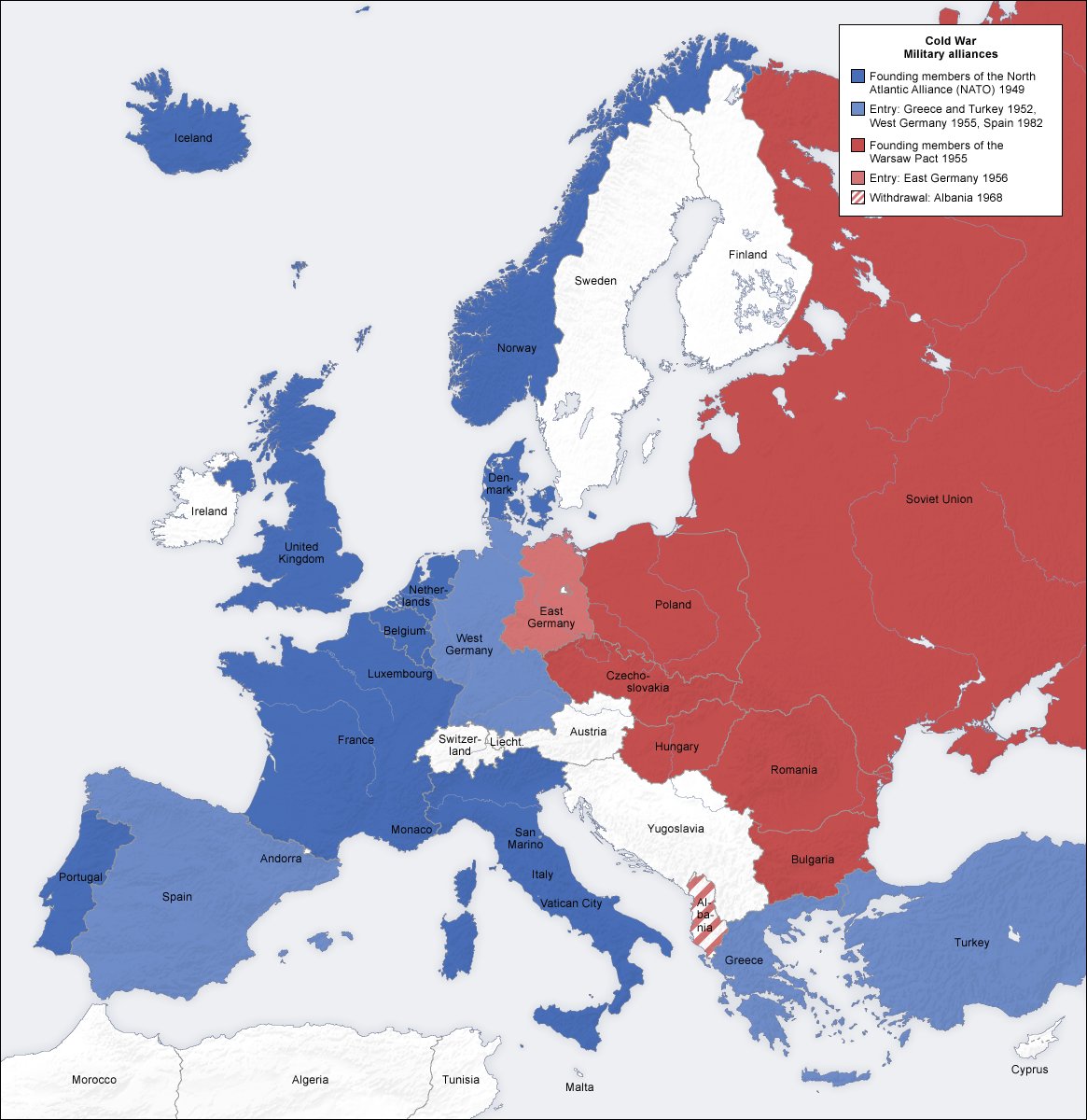
European military alliances

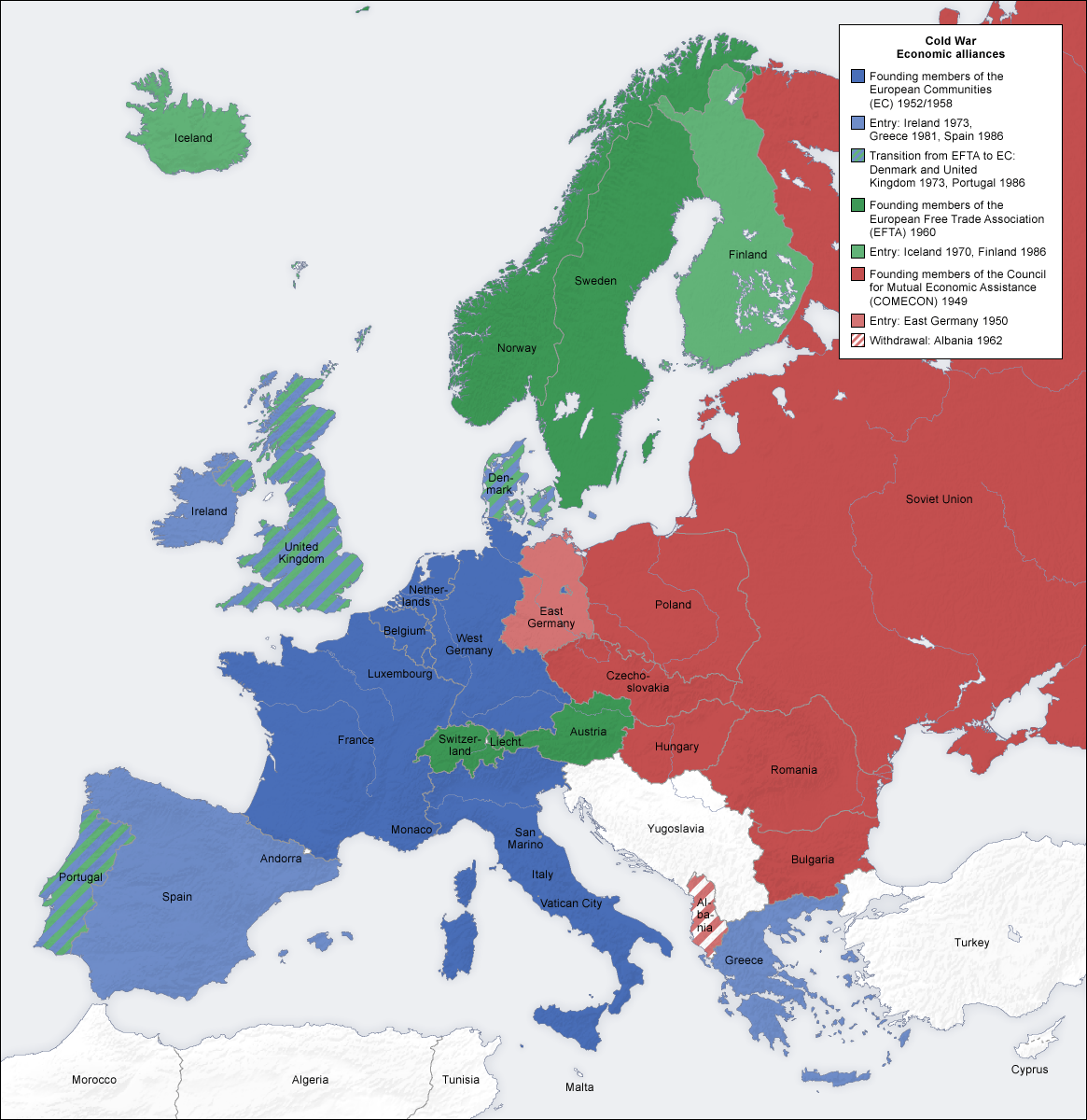
European economic blocs

Soviet territorial demands to Turkey regarding the Dardanelles in the Turkish Straits crisis and Black Sea border disputes were also a major factor in increasing tensions. In September, the Soviet side produced the Novikov telegram, sent by the Soviet ambassador to the US but commissioned and "co-authored" by Vyacheslav Molotov; it portrayed the US as being in the grip of monopoly capitalists who were building up military capability "to prepare the conditions for winning world supremacy in a new war". On 6 September 1946, James F. Byrnes delivered a speech in Germany repudiating the Morgenthau Plan (a proposal to partition and de-industrialize post-war Germany) and warning the Soviets that the US intended to maintain a military presence in Europe indefinitely. As Byrnes stated a month later, "The nub of our program was to win the German people ... it was a battle between us and Russia over minds ..." In December, the Soviets agreed to withdraw from Iran after persistent US pressure, an early success of containment policy.

By 1947, US president Harry S. Truman was outraged by the perceived resistance of the Soviet Union to American demands in Iran, Turkey, and Greece, as well as Soviet rejection of the Baruch Plan on nuclear weapons. In February 1947, the British government announced that it could no longer afford to finance the Kingdom of Greece against the Communist-led DSE in the Greek Civil War. In the same month, Stalin conducted the rigged 1947 Polish legislative election which constituted an open breach of the Yalta Agreement. The US government responded by adopting a policy of containment, with the goal of stopping the spread of communism. Truman delivered a speech calling for the allocation of $400 million to intervene in the war and unveiled the Truman Doctrine, which framed the conflict as a contest between free peoples and totalitarian regimes. American policymakers accused the Soviet Union of conspiring against the Greek royalists in an effort to expand Soviet influence even though Stalin had told the Communist Party to cooperate with the British-backed government.

Enunciation of the Truman Doctrine marked the beginning of a US bipartisan defense and foreign policy consensus between Republicans and Democrats focused on containment and deterrence that weakened during and after the Vietnam War, but ultimately persisted thereafter. Moderate and conservative parties in Europe, as well as social democrats, gave virtually unconditional support to the Western alliance, while European and American Communists, financed by the KGB and involved in its intelligence operations, adhered to Moscow's line, although dissent began to appear after 1956. Other critiques of the consensus policy came from anti-Vietnam War activists, the Campaign for Nuclear Disarmament, and the anti-nuclear movement.

=== Marshall Plan, Czechoslovak coup and formation of two German states ===
The labeling used on the Marshall Plan economic aid to Western Europe

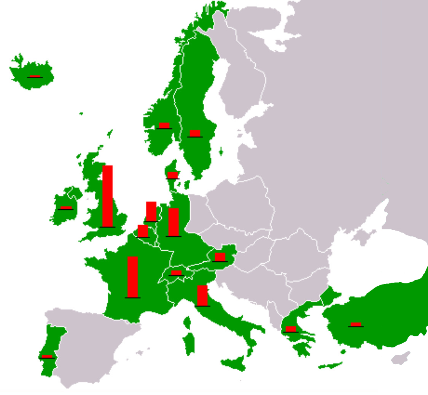
Map of Cold War-era Europe and the Near East showing countries that received Marshall Plan aid. The red columns show the relative amount of total aid received per nation.

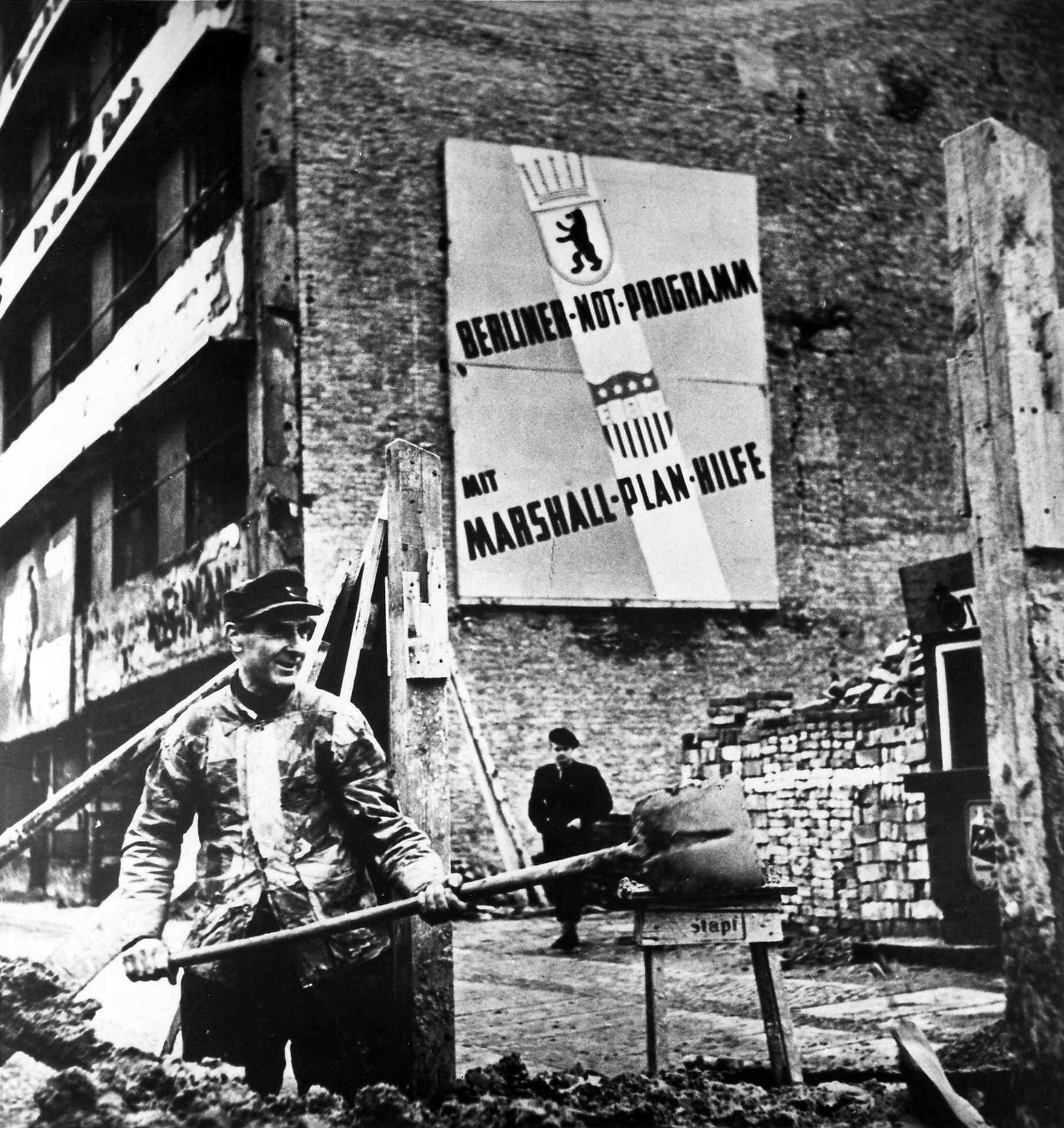
Construction in West Berlin under Marshall Plan aid

In early 1947, France, Britain and the United States unsuccessfully attempted to reach an agreement with the Soviet Union for a plan envisioning an economically self-sufficient Germany, including a detailed accounting of the industrial plants, goods and infrastructure already taken by the Soviets. In June 1947, in accordance with the Truman Doctrine, the United States drafted the Marshall Plan, a pledge of economic assistance for all European countries willing to participate. Under the plan, which President Harry S. Truman signed on 3 April 1948, the US government gave to Western European countries over $13 billion (equivalent to $189 billion in 2016). Later, the program led to the creation of the OECD.

The plan's aim was to rebuild the democratic and economic systems of Europe and to counter perceived threats to the European balance of power, such as communist parties seizing control. The plan also stated that European prosperity was contingent upon German economic recovery. One month later, Truman signed the National Security Act of 1947, creating a unified Department of Defense, the Central Intelligence Agency (CIA), and the National Security Council (NSC). These would become the main bureaucracies for US defense policy in the Cold War.

Stalin believed economic integration with the West would allow Eastern Bloc countries to escape Soviet control, and that the US was trying to buy a pro-US re-alignment of Europe. Stalin therefore prevented Eastern Bloc nations from receiving Marshall Plan aid. The Soviet Union's alternative to the Marshall Plan, which was purported to involve Soviet subsidies and trade with central and eastern Europe, became known as the Molotov Plan (later institutionalized in January 1949 as the Council for Mutual Economic Assistance). Stalin was also fearful of a reconstituted Germany; his vision of a post-war Germany did not include the ability to rearm or pose any kind of threat to the Soviet Union.

In early 1948, Czech Communists executed a coup d'état in Czechoslovakia (resulting in the formation of the Czechoslovak Socialist Republic), the only Eastern Bloc state that the Soviets had permitted to retain democratic structures. The public brutality of the coup shocked Western powers more than any event up to that point and swept away the last vestiges of opposition to the Marshall Plan in the United States Congress.

In an immediate aftermath of the crisis, the London Six-Power Conference was held, resulting in the Soviet boycott of the Allied Control Council and its incapacitation, an event marking the beginning of the full-blown Cold War, as well as ending any hopes at the time for a single German government and leading to formation in 1949 of the Federal Republic of Germany and German Democratic Republic.

The twin policies of the Truman Doctrine and the Marshall Plan led to billions in economic and military aid for Western Europe, Greece, and Turkey. With the US assistance, the Greek military won its civil war. Under the leadership of Alcide De Gasperi the Italian Christian Democrats defeated the powerful Communist–Socialist alliance in the elections of 1948, with covert support from the United States.

Outside of Europe, the United States also began to express interest in the development of many other countries, so that they would not fall under the sway of Eastern Bloc communism. In his January 1949 inaugural address, Truman declared for the first time in US history that international development would be a key part of US foreign policy. The resulting program later became known as the Point Four Program because it was the fourth point raised in his address.

=== Espionage ===
All major powers engaged in espionage, using a great variety of spies, double agents, moles, and new technologies such as the tapping of telephone cables. The Soviet KGB ("Committee for State Security"), the bureau responsible for foreign espionage and internal surveillance, was famous for its effectiveness. The most famous Soviet operation involved its atomic spies that delivered crucial information from the United States' Manhattan Project, leading the USSR to detonate its first nuclear weapon in 1949, four years after the American detonation and much sooner than expected. A massive network of informants throughout the Soviet Union was used to monitor dissent from official Soviet politics and morals. Although to an extent disinformation had always existed, the term itself was invented, and the strategy formalized by a black propaganda department of the Soviet KGB. (Note: Jowett & O'Donnell 2005, pp. 21–23: "In fact, the word disinformation is a cognate for the Russian dezinformatsia, taken from the name of a division of the KGB devoted to black propaganda.")

Based on the amount of top-secret Cold War archival information that has been released, historian Raymond L. Garthoff concludes there probably was parity in the quantity and quality of secret information obtained by each side. However, the Soviets probably had an advantage in terms of HUMINT (human intelligence or interpersonal espionage) and "sometimes in its reach into high policy circles." In terms of decisive impact, however, he concludes:

We also can now have high confidence in the judgment that there were no successful "moles" at the political decision-making level on either side. Similarly, there is no evidence, on either side, of any major political or military decision that was prematurely discovered through espionage and thwarted by the other side. There also is no evidence of any major political or military decision that was crucially influenced (much less generated) by an agent of the other side.

According to historian Robert L. Benson, "Washington's forte was 'signals' intelligence – the procurement and analysis of coded foreign messages," leading to the Venona project or Venona intercepts, which monitored the communications of Soviet intelligence agents. Moynihan wrote that the Venona project contained "overwhelming proof of the activities of Soviet spy networks in America, complete with names, dates, places, and deeds." The Venona project was kept highly secret even from policymakers until the Moynihan Commission in 1995. Despite this, the decryption project had already been betrayed and dispatched to the USSR by Kim Philby and Bill Weisband in 1946, as was discovered by the US by 1950. Nonetheless, the Soviets had to keep their discovery of the program secret, too, and continued leaking their own information, some of which was still useful to the American program. According to Moynihan, even President Truman may not have been fully informed of Venona, which may have left him unaware of the extent of Soviet espionage.

Clandestine atomic spies from the Soviet Union, who infiltrated the Manhattan Project during WWII, played a major role in increasing tensions that led to the Cold War.

In addition to usual espionage, the Western agencies paid special attention to debriefing Eastern Bloc defectors. Edward Jay Epstein describes that the CIA understood that the KGB used "provocations", or fake defections, as a trick to embarrass Western intelligence and establish Soviet double agents. As a result, from 1959 to 1973, the CIA required that East Bloc defectors went through a counterintelligence investigation before being recruited as a source of intelligence.

During the late 1970s and 1980s, the KGB perfected its use of espionage to sway and distort diplomacy. Active measures were "clandestine operations designed to further Soviet foreign policy goals," consisting of disinformation, forgeries, leaks to foreign media, and the channeling of aid to militant groups. Retired KGB Major General Oleg Kalugin described active measures as "the heart and soul of Soviet intelligence."

During the Sino-Soviet split, "spy wars" also occurred between the USSR and PRC.

=== Cominform and the Tito–Stalin Split ===
In September 1947, the Soviets created Cominform to impose orthodoxy within the international communist movement and tighten political control over Soviet satellites through coordination of communist parties in the Eastern Bloc. Cominform faced an embarrassing setback the following June, when the Tito–Stalin split obliged its members to expel Yugoslavia, which remained communist but adopted a non-aligned position and began accepting financial aid from the US.

Besides Berlin, the status of the city of Trieste was at issue. Until the break between Tito and Stalin, the Western powers and the Eastern bloc faced each other uncompromisingly. In addition to capitalism and communism, Italians and Slovenes, monarchists and republicans as well as war winners and losers often faced each other irreconcilably. The neutral buffer state Free Territory of Trieste, founded in 1947 with the United Nations, was split up and dissolved in 1954 and 1975, also because of the détente between the West and Tito.

=== Berlin Blockade ===
The US and Britain merged their western German occupation zones into "Bizone" (1 January 1947, later "Trizone" with the addition of France's zone, April 1949). As part of the economic rebuilding of Germany, in early 1948, representatives of a number of Western European governments and the United States announced an agreement for a merger of western German areas into a federal governmental system. In addition, in accordance with the Marshall Plan, they began to re-industrialize and rebuild the West German economy, including the introduction of a new Deutsche Mark currency to replace the old Reichsmark currency that the Soviets had debased. The US had secretly decided that a unified and neutral Germany was undesirable, with Walter Bedell Smith telling General Eisenhower "in spite of our announced position, we really do not want nor intend to accept German unification on any terms that the Russians might agree to, even though they seem to meet most of our requirements."

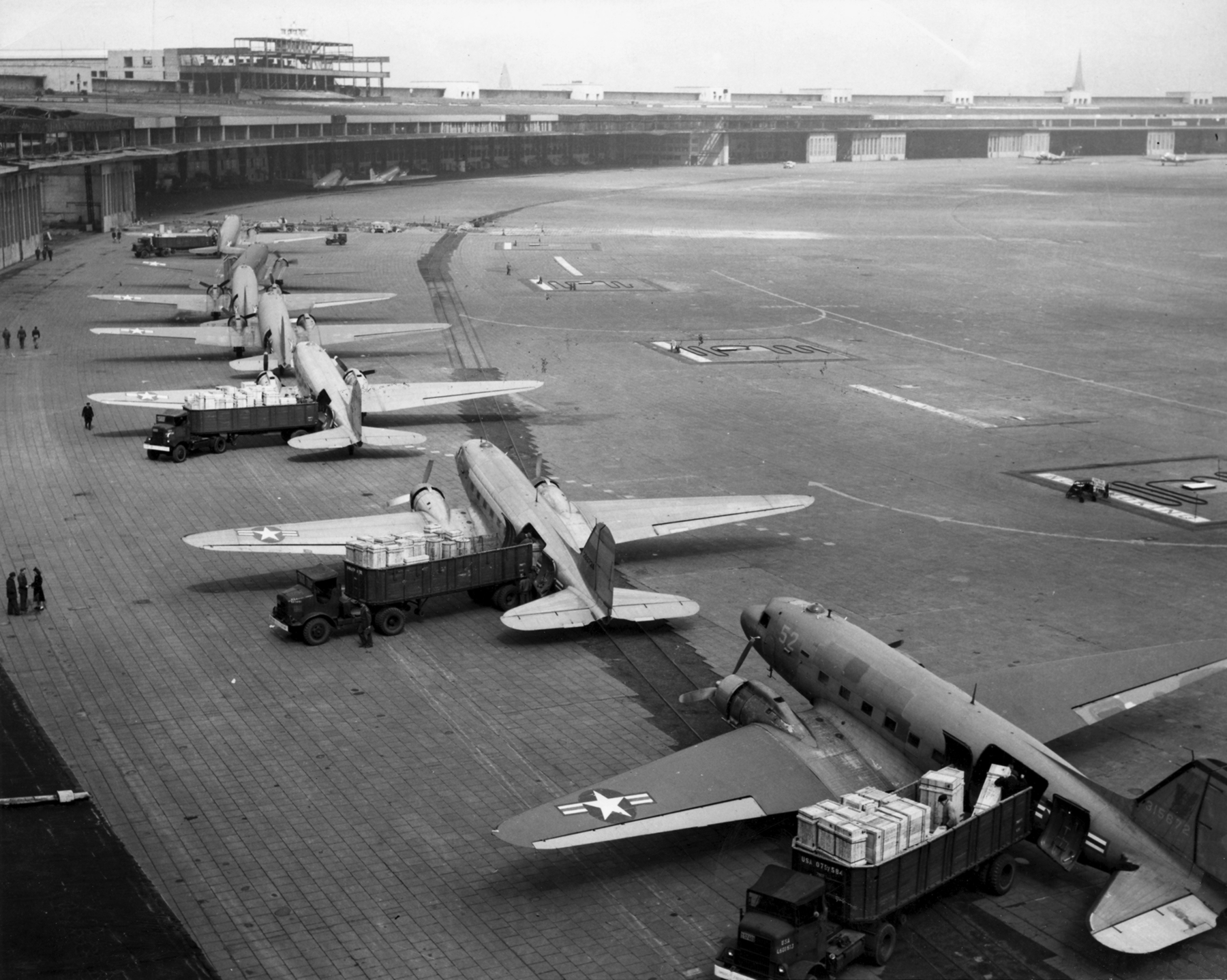
American C-47s unloading at the Berlin Tempelhof Airport during the Berlin Blockade

Shortly thereafter, Stalin instituted the Berlin Blockade (June 1948 – May 1949), one of the first major crises of the Cold War, preventing Western supplies from reaching West Germany's enclave of West Berlin. The United States (primarily), Britain, France, Canada, Australia, New Zealand, and several other countries began the massive "Berlin airlift", supplying West Berlin with provisions despite Soviet threats.

The Soviets mounted a public relations campaign against the policy change. Once again, the East Berlin communists attempted to disrupt the Berlin municipal elections, which were held on 5 December 1948 and produced a turnout of 86% and an overwhelming victory for the non-communist parties. The results effectively divided the city into East and West, the latter comprising US, British and French sectors. 300,000 Berliners demonstrated and urged the international airlift to continue, and US Air Force pilot Gail Halvorsen created "Operation Vittles", which supplied candy to German children. The Airlift was as much a logistical as a political and psychological success for the West; it firmly linked West Berlin to the United States. In May 1949, Stalin lifted the blockade.

In 1952, Stalin repeatedly proposed a plan to unify East and West Germany under a single government chosen in elections supervised by the United Nations, if the new Germany were to stay out of Western military alliances, but this proposal was turned down by the Western powers. Some sources dispute the sincerity of the proposal.

=== Beginnings of NATO and Radio Free Europe ===
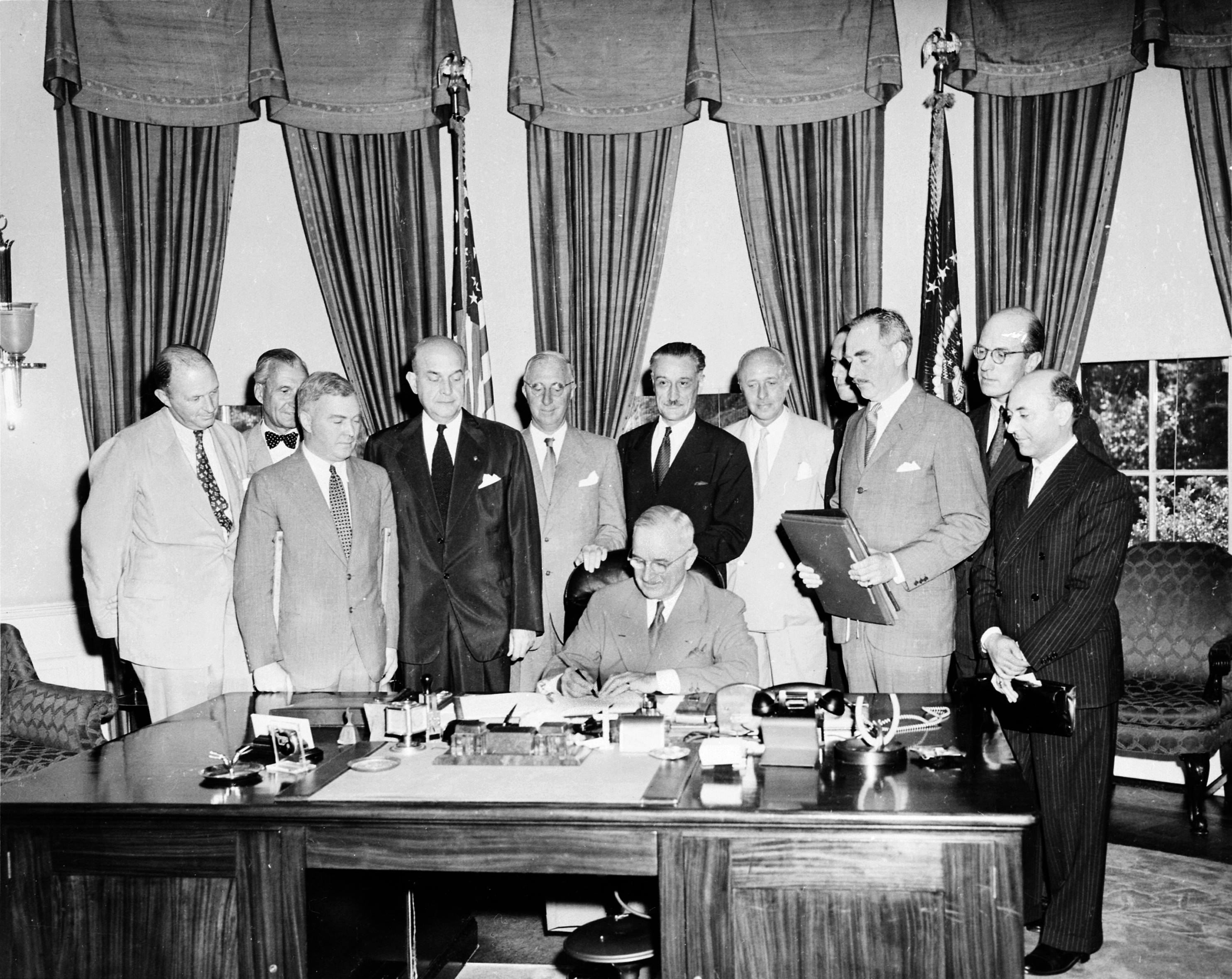
President Truman signs the North Atlantic Treaty with guests in the Oval Office

Britain, France, the United States, Canada, and eight other Western European countries signed the North Atlantic Treaty of April 1949, establishing the North Atlantic Treaty Organization (NATO). That August, the first Soviet atomic device was detonated in Semipalatinsk, Kazakh SSR. Following Soviet refusals to participate in a German rebuilding effort set forth by western European countries in 1948, the US, Britain and France spearheaded the establishment of the Federal Republic of Germany from the three Western zones of occupation in April 1949. The Soviet Union proclaimed its zone of occupation in Germany the German Democratic Republic that October.

Media in the Eastern Bloc was an organ of the state, completely reliant on and subservient to the communist party. Radio and television organizations were state-owned, while print media was usually owned by political organizations, mostly by the local communist party. Soviet radio broadcasts used Marxist rhetoric to attack capitalism, emphasizing themes of labor exploitation, imperialism and war-mongering.

Along with the broadcasts of the BBC and the Voice of America to Central and Eastern Europe, a major propaganda effort began in 1949 was Radio Free Europe/Radio Liberty, dedicated to bringing about the peaceful demise of the communist system in the Eastern Bloc. Radio Free Europe attempted to achieve these goals by serving as a surrogate home radio station, an alternative to the controlled and party-dominated domestic press in the Soviet Bloc. Radio Free Europe was a product of some of the most prominent architects of America's early Cold War strategy, especially those who believed that the Cold War would eventually be fought by political rather than military means, such as George F. Kennan. Soviet and Eastern Bloc authorities used various methods to suppress Western broadcasts, including radio jamming.

American policymakers, including Kennan and John Foster Dulles, acknowledged that the Cold War was in its essence a war of ideas. The United States, acting through the CIA, funded a long list of projects to counter the communist appeal among intellectuals in Europe and the developing world. The CIA also covertly sponsored a domestic propaganda campaign called Crusade for Freedom.

=== German rearmament ===
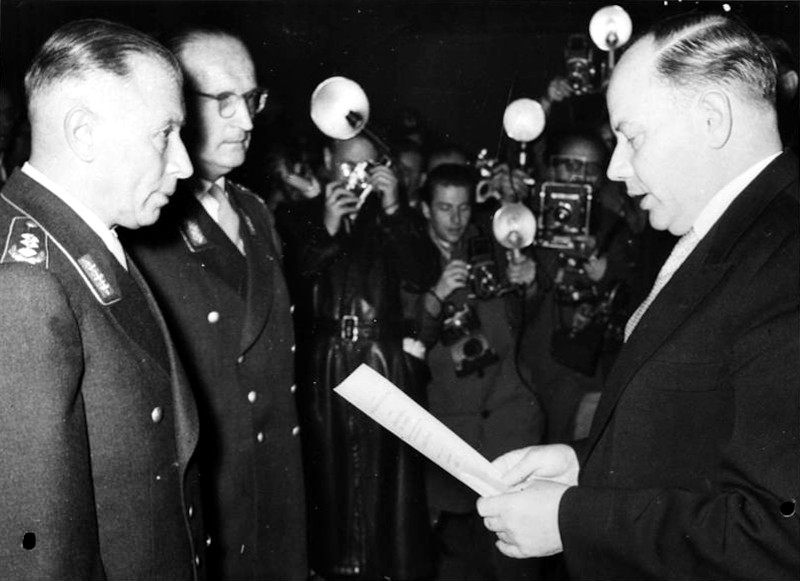
Generals Adolf Heusinger and Hans Speidel sworn into the newly founded Bundeswehr by Theodor Blank in November 1955

The rearmament of West Germany was achieved in the early 1950s. Its main promoter was Konrad Adenauer, the chancellor of West Germany, with France the main opponent. Washington had the decisive voice. It was strongly supported by the Pentagon (the US military leadership), and weakly opposed by President Truman; the State Department was ambivalent. The outbreak of the Korean War in June 1950 changed the calculations and Washington now gave full support. That also involved naming Dwight D. Eisenhower in charge of NATO forces and sending more American troops to West Germany. There was a strong promise that West Germany would not develop nuclear weapons.

Widespread fears of another rise of German militarism necessitated the new military to operate within an alliance framework under NATO command. In 1955, Washington secured full German membership of NATO. In May 1953, Lavrentiy Beria, by then in a government post, had made an unsuccessful proposal to allow the reunification of a neutral Germany to prevent West Germany's incorporation into NATO, but his attempts were cut short after he was executed several months later during a Soviet power struggle. The events led to the establishment of the Bundeswehr, the West German military, in 1955.

=== Chinese Civil War, SEATO, and NSC 68 ===
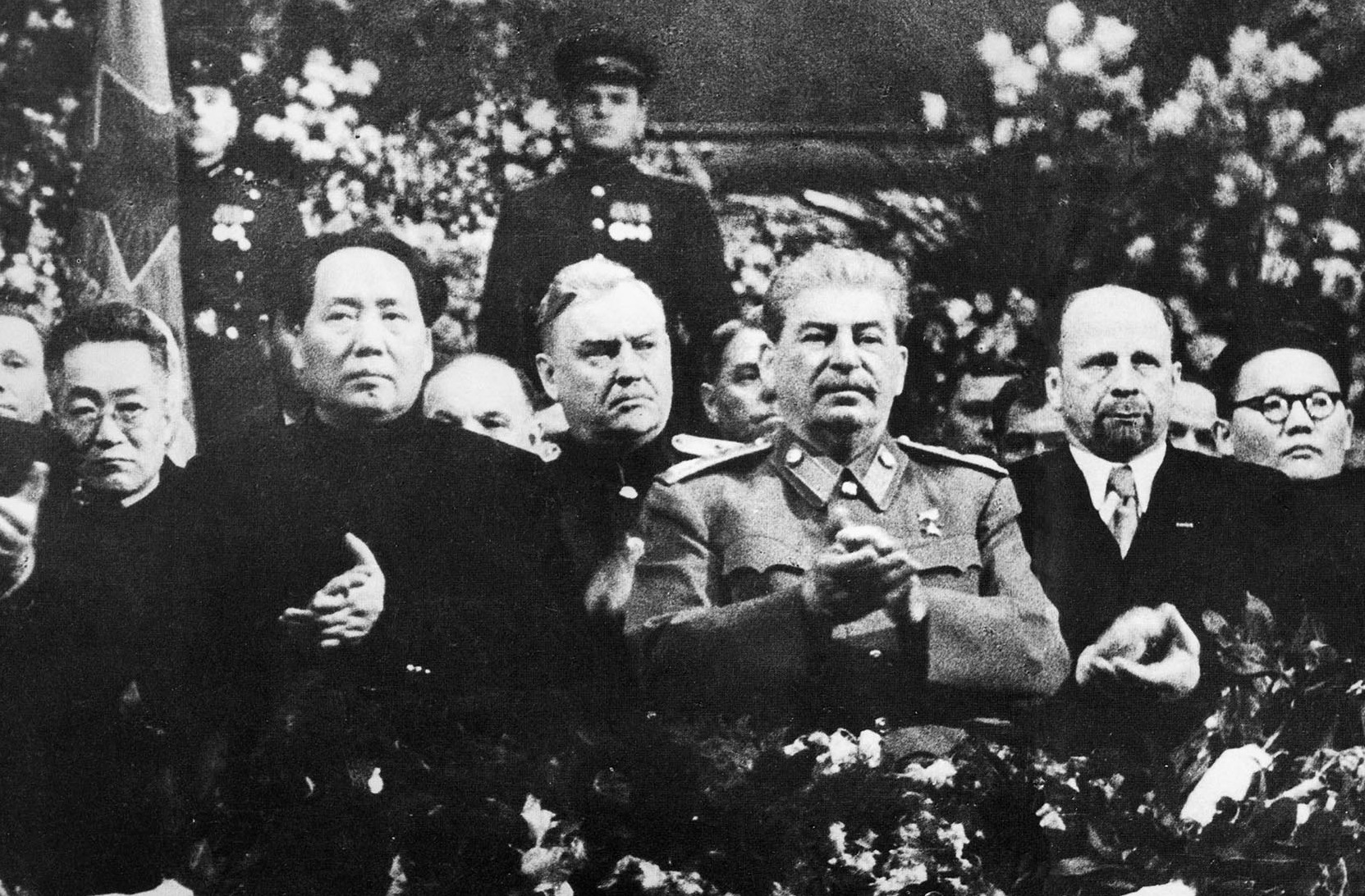
Mao Zedong and Joseph Stalin in Moscow, December 1949

In 1949, Mao Zedong's People's Liberation Army defeated Chiang Kai-shek's United States-backed Kuomintang (KMT) Nationalist Government in China. The KMT-controlled territory was now restricted to the island of Taiwan, the nationalist government of which exists to this day. The Kremlin promptly created an alliance with the newly formed People's Republic of China. According to Norwegian historian Odd Arne Westad, the communists won the Civil War because they made fewer military mistakes than Chiang Kai-Shek made, and because in his search for a powerful centralized government, Chiang antagonized too many interest groups in China. Moreover, his party was weakened during the war against Japan. Meanwhile, the communists told different groups, such as the peasants, exactly what they wanted to hear, and they cloaked themselves under the cover of Chinese nationalism.

Confronted with the communist revolution in China and the end of the American atomic monopoly in 1949, the Truman administration quickly moved to escalate and expand its containment doctrine. In NSC 68, a secret 1950 document, the National Security Council proposed reinforcing pro-Western alliance systems and quadrupling spending on defense. Truman, under the influence of advisor Paul Nitze, saw containment as implying complete rollback of Soviet influence in all its forms.

United States officials moved to expand this version of containment into Asia, Africa, and Latin America, in order to counter revolutionary nationalist movements, often led by communist parties financed by the USSR. In this way, this US would exercise "preponderant power," oppose neutrality, and establish global hegemony. In the early 1950s (a period sometimes known as the "Pactomania"), the US formalized a series of alliances with Japan (a former WWII enemy), South Korea, Taiwan, Australia, New Zealand, Thailand, and the Philippines (notably ANZUS in 1951 and SEATO in 1954), thereby guaranteeing the United States a number of long-term military bases.

=== Korean War ===
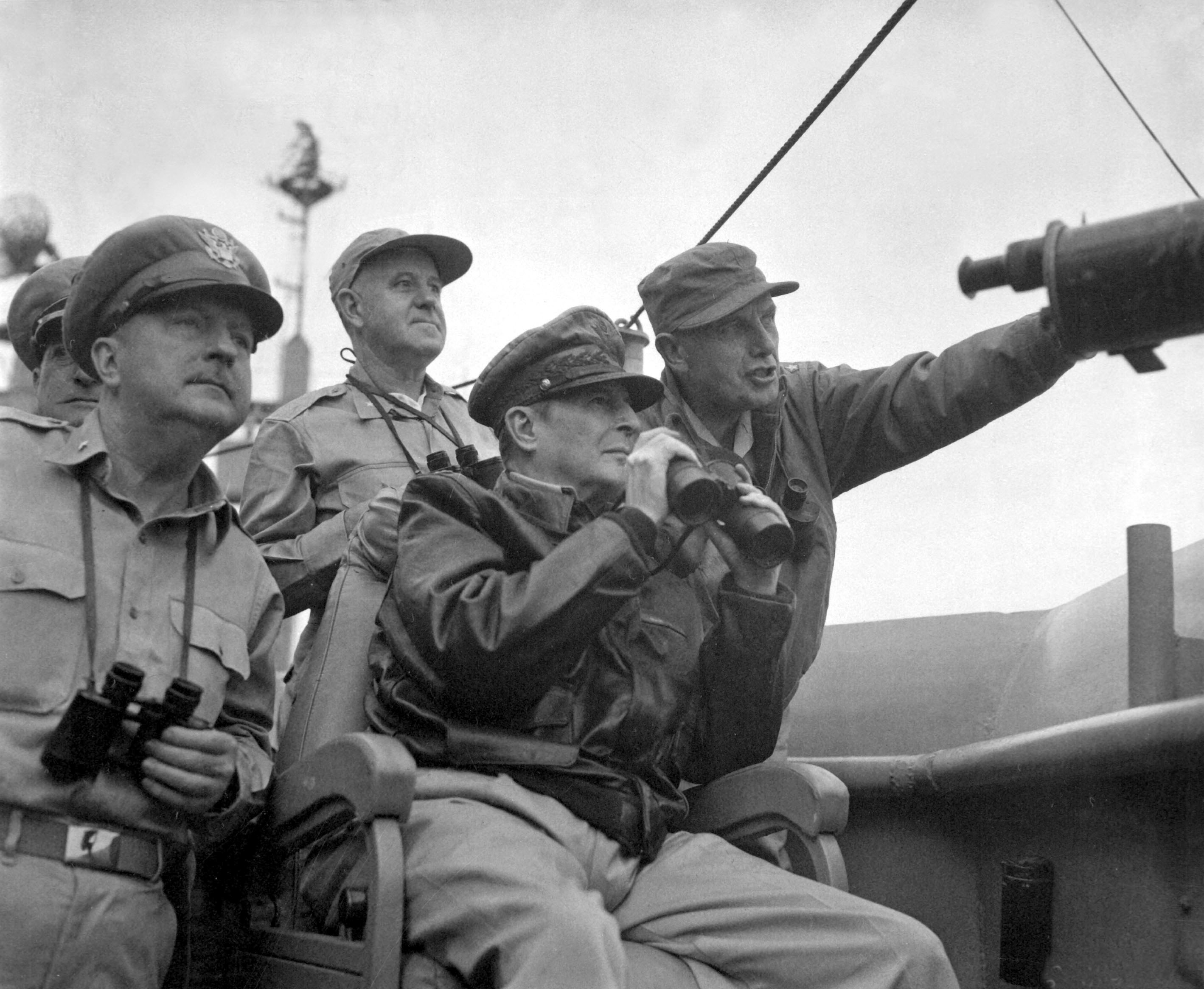
General Douglas MacArthur, UN Command CiC (seated), observes the naval shelling of Incheon, Korea from USS Mt. McKinley, 15 September 1950

One of the more significant examples of the implementation of containment was the United Nations US-led intervention in the Korean War. In June 1950, after years of mutual hostilities, (Note: Matray 2002: "South Korea's President Rhee was obsessed with accomplishing early reunification through military means. The Truman administration's fear that Rhee would launch an invasion prompted it to limit South Korea's military capabilities, refusing to provide tanks, heavy artillery, and combat planes. This did not stop the South Koreans from initiating most of the border clashes with North Korean forces at the thirty-eighth parallel beginning in the summer of 1948 and reaching a high level of intensity and violence a year later. Historians now acknowledge that the two Koreas already were waging a civil conflict when North Korea's attack opened the conventional phase of the war.") Kim Il Sung's North Korean People's Army invaded South Korea. Stalin had been reluctant to support the invasion (Note: Matray 2002: "Contradicting traditional assumptions, however, available declassified Soviet documents demonstrate that throughout 1949 Stalin consistently refused to approve Kim Il Sung's persistent requests to approve an invasion of South Korea. The Soviet leader believed that North Korea had not achieved either military superiority north of the parallel or political strength south of that line. His main concern was the threat South Korea posed to North Korea's survival, for example fearing an invasion northward following U.S. military withdrawal in June 1949.") but ultimately sent advisers. To Stalin's surprise, the United Nations Security Council backed the defense of South Korea, although the Soviets were then boycotting meetings in protest of the fact that Taiwan (Republic of China), not the People's Republic of China, held a permanent seat on the United Nations Security Council. A UN force of sixteen countries faced North Korea, although 40 percent of troops were South Korean, and about 50 percent were from the United States.

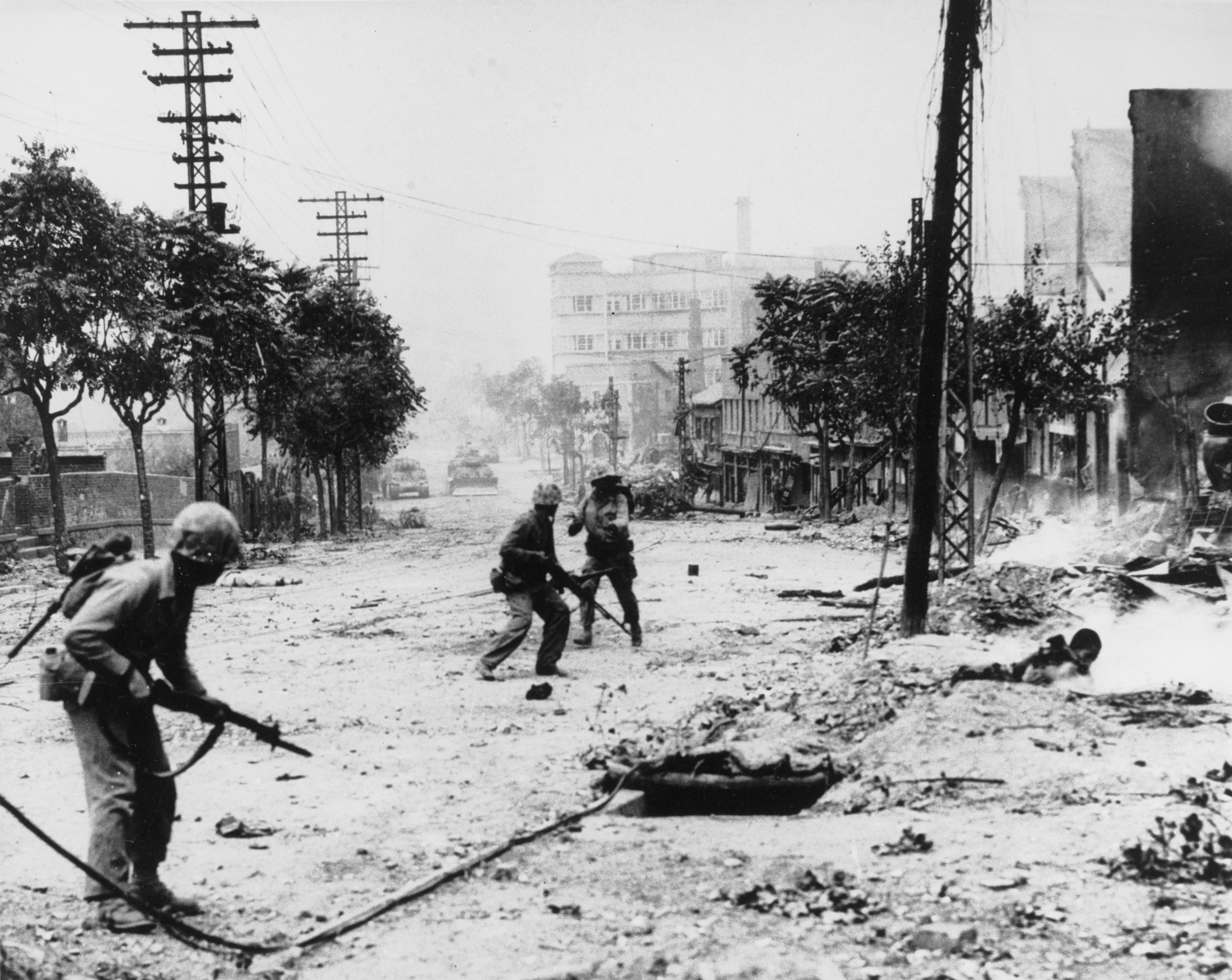
US Marines engaged in street fighting during the liberation of Seoul, September 1950

The US initially seemed to follow containment, only pushing back North Korea across the 38th Parallel and restoring South Korea's sovereignty while allowing North Korea's survival as a state. However, the success of the Inchon landing inspired the US/UN forces to pursue a rollback strategy instead and to overthrow communist North Korea, thereby allowing nationwide elections under UN auspices. General Douglas MacArthur then advanced into North Korea. The Chinese, fearful of a possible US invasion, sent in a large army and pushed the UN forces back below the 38th parallel. The episode was used to support the wisdom of the containment doctrine as opposed to rollback. The Communists were later pushed to roughly around the original border, with minimal changes. Among other effects, the Korean War galvanised NATO to develop a military structure. The Korean Armistice Agreement was approved in July 1953.

== Nuclear arms race and escalation (1953–1962) ==
=== Khrushchev, Eisenhower, and de-Stalinization ===
NATO and Warsaw Pact troop strengths in Europe in 1959

In 1953, changes in political leadership on both sides shifted the dynamic of the Cold War. Dwight D. Eisenhower was inaugurated president that January. During the last 18 months of the Truman administration, the American defense budget had quadrupled, and Eisenhower moved to reduce military spending by a third while continuing to fight the Cold War effectively.

Joseph Stalin died in 1953. Nikita Khrushchev eventually won the ensuing power struggle by the mid-1950s. In 1956, he denounced Joseph Stalin and proceeded to ease controls over the party and society (de-Stalinization).

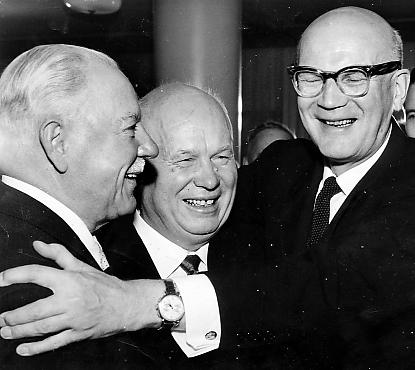
From left to right: Soviet head of state Kliment Voroshilov, Soviet first secretary Nikita Khrushchev, and Finnish president Urho Kekkonen at Moscow in 1960

On 18 November 1956, while addressing Western dignitaries at a reception in Moscow's Polish embassy, Khrushchev infamously declared, "Whether you like it or not, history is on our side. We will bury you", shocking everyone present. He would later clarify he had not been referring to nuclear war, but the "historically fated victory of communism over capitalism."

Eisenhower's secretary of state, John Foster Dulles, initiated a "New Look" for the containment strategy, calling for a greater reliance on nuclear weapons against US enemies in wartime. Dulles also enunciated the doctrine of "massive retaliation", threatening a severe US response to any Soviet aggression. Possessing nuclear superiority, for example, allowed Eisenhower to face down Soviet threats to intervene in the Middle East during the 1956 Suez Crisis. The declassified US plans for retaliatory nuclear strikes in the late 1950s included the "systematic destruction" of 1,200 major urban centers in the Soviet Bloc and China, including Moscow, East Berlin and Beijing.

In spite of these events, there were substantial hopes for détente when an upswing in diplomacy took place in 1959, including a two-week visit by Khrushchev to the US, and plans for a two-power summit for May 1960. The latter was disturbed by the U-2 spy plane scandal, however, in which Eisenhower was caught lying about the intrusion of American surveillance aircraft into Soviet territory.

=== Warsaw Pact and Hungarian Revolution ===
The Hungarian Revolution of 1956

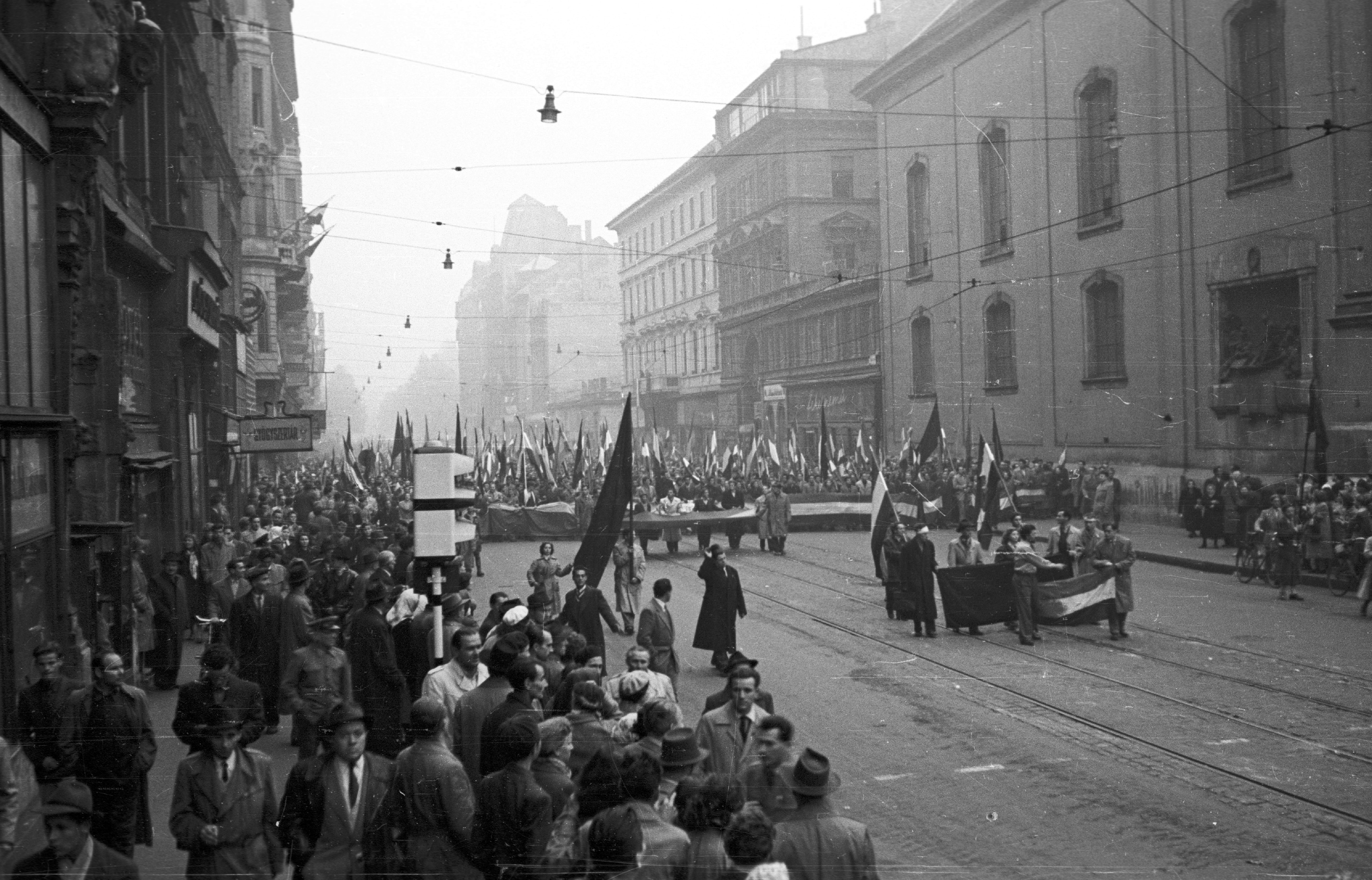
March of protesters in Budapest, on 25 October;

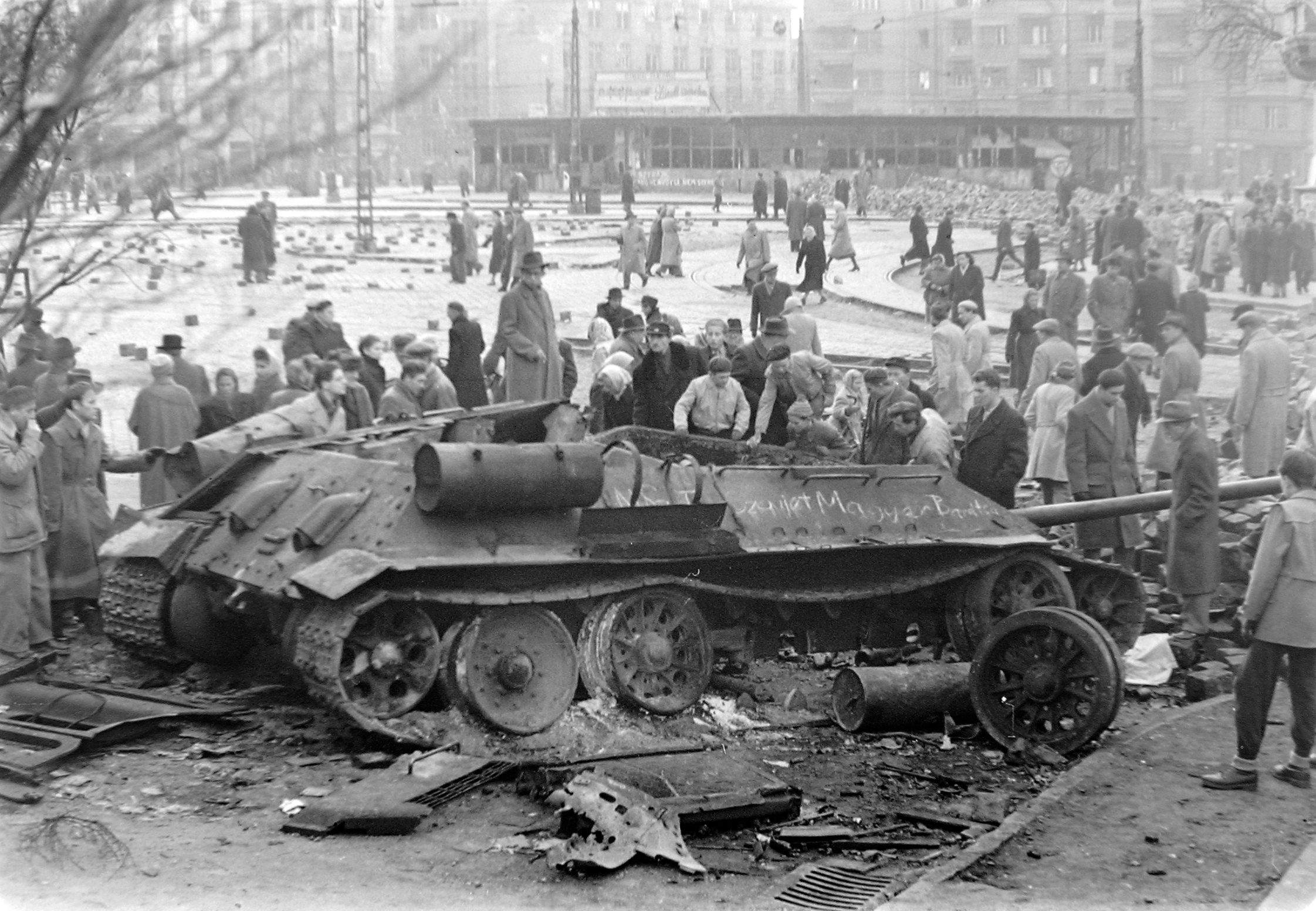
A destroyed Soviet T-34-85 tank in Budapest

While Stalin's death in 1953 slightly relaxed tensions, the situation in Europe remained an uneasy armed truce. The Soviets, who had already created a network of mutual assistance treaties in the Eastern Bloc by 1949, established a formal alliance therein, the Warsaw Pact, in 1955. It stood opposed to NATO.

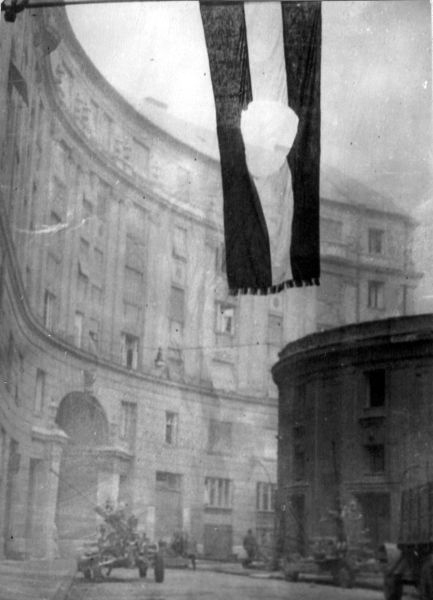
Hungarian flag (1949–1956) with the communist coat of arms cut out was an anti-Soviet revolutionary symbol

The Hungarian Revolution of 1956 occurred shortly after Khrushchev arranged the removal of Hungary's Stalinist leader Mátyás Rákosi. In response to a popular anti-communist uprising, (Note: "Revolt in Hungary". Archived from the original on 17 November 2007. Narrator: Walter Cronkite, producer: CBS (1956) – Fonds 306, Audiovisual Materials Relating to the 1956 Hungarian Revolution, OSA Archivum, Budapest, Hungary ID number: HU OSA 306-0-1:40) the new regime formally disbanded the secret police, declared its intention to withdraw from the Warsaw Pact and pledged to re-establish free elections. The Soviet Army invaded. Thousands of Hungarians were killed and arrested, imprisoned and deported to the Soviet Union, and approximately 200,000 Hungarians fled Hungary. Hungarian leader Imre Nagy and others were executed following secret trials.

From 1957 through 1961, Khrushchev openly and repeatedly threatened the West with nuclear annihilation. He claimed that Soviet missile capabilities were far superior to those of the United States, capable of wiping out any American or European city. According to John Lewis Gaddis, Khrushchev rejected Stalin's "belief in the inevitability of war," however. The new leader declared his ultimate goal was "peaceful coexistence". In Khrushchev's formulation, peace would allow capitalism to collapse on its own, as well as giving the Soviets time to boost their military capabilities, which remained for decades until Gorbachev's later "new thinking" envisioning peaceful coexistence as an end in itself rather than a form of class struggle.

The events in Hungary produced ideological fractures within the communist parties of the world, particularly in Western Europe, with great decline in membership, as many in both western and socialist countries felt disillusioned by the brutal Soviet response. The communist parties in the West would never recover.

=== Rapacki Plan and Berlin Crisis of 1958–1959 ===
In 1957, Polish foreign minister Adam Rapacki proposed the Rapacki Plan for a nuclear free zone in central Europe. Public opinion tended to be favourable in the West, but it was rejected by leaders of West Germany, Britain, France and the United States. They feared it would leave the powerful conventional armies of the Warsaw Pact dominant over the weaker NATO armies.

During November 1958, Khrushchev made an unsuccessful attempt to turn all of Berlin into an independent, demilitarized "free city". He gave the United States, Great Britain and France a six-month ultimatum to withdraw their troops from the sectors of West Berlin, or he would transfer control of Western access rights to the East Germans. Khrushchev earlier explained to Mao Zedong that "Berlin is the testicles of the West. Every time I want to make the West scream, I squeeze on Berlin." NATO formally rejected the ultimatum in mid-December and Khrushchev withdrew it in return for a Geneva conference on the German question.

=== American military buildup ===
Like Truman and Eisenhower, John F. Kennedy supported containment. President Eisenhower's New Look policy had emphasized the use of less expensive nuclear weapons to deter Soviet aggression by threatening massive nuclear attacks on all of the Soviet Union. Nuclear weapons were much cheaper than maintaining a large standing army, so Eisenhower cut conventional forces to save money. Kennedy implemented a new strategy known as flexible response. This strategy relied on conventional arms to achieve limited goals. As part of this policy, Kennedy expanded the United States special operations forces, elite military units that could fight unconventionally in various conflicts. Kennedy hoped that the flexible response strategy would allow the US to counter Soviet influence without resorting to nuclear war.

To support his new strategy, Kennedy ordered a massive increase in defense spending and a rapid build-up of the nuclear arsenal to restore the lost superiority over the Soviet Union. In his inaugural address, Kennedy promised "to bear any burden" in the defense of liberty, and he repeatedly asked for increases in military spending and authorization of new weapons systems. From 1961 to 1964, the number of nuclear weapons increased by 50 percent, as did the number of B-52 bombers to deliver them. The new ICBM force grew from 63 intercontinental ballistic missiles to 424. He authorized 23 new Polaris submarines, each of which carried 16 nuclear missiles. Kennedy also called on cities to construct fallout shelters.

=== Competition in the Third World ===
Economist Adam Hanieh argues that, in the post-WWII era, the global capitalist system was destabilized by a wave of decolonization movements that swept through Africa, Asia, and Latin America. According to historian L. S. Stavrianos, inspired by the Soviet Union’s rapid socioeconomic progress, numerous revolutionary governments subsequently implemented state-planned economies and public ownership. In his autobiography, the former Prime Minister of India, Jawaharlal Nehru, proclaimed that "the presence and example of the Soviets was a bright and heartening phenomenon in a dark and dismal world." Political scientist Michael Parenti argues that these revolutionary governments implemented land reform and comprehensive programs for health, education, housing, and employment. By addressing the legacies of colonial exploitation and extreme poverty, he writes, these initiatives resulted in a historically unprecedented rise in the standard of living for hundreds of millions of people. Economist Samir Amin contends that these revolutionary governments also achieved progress in industrialization, economic equality, and the construction of modern states. According to economist Alice Amsden, World Bank data reveal a historic trend between 1950 and 1980: for the first time in recorded history, developing economies outpaced developed economies, achieving an average annual income growth of over 5% compared to 4% in the developed economies. She described this era as "a period of unprecedented expansion in living standards, per capita income, wages, and poverty reduction."

Political scientist Michael Parenti argues that the U.S. launched a global "counter-revolution" to suppress the rise of revolutionary nationalist governments in the Third World, involving direct military interventions, coups, funding opposition movements, and the training of military forces. Historian Dov H. Levin notes that, between 1946 and 2000, the U.S. interfered in the elections of 81 countries. According to Mark Curtis, the U.S. and other NATO allies actively backed fundamentalist Islamist movements throughout the Middle East, North Africa, and Central and Southern Asia. These movements were seen as a strategic buffer against Soviet influence and a counterforce to nationalist and socialist movements. This policy was formalized at the highest levels during the Arab Cold War, when, in 1957, President Eisenhower approved a policy to "do everything possible to stress the 'holy war' aspect." Reflecting on this policy decades later, Saudi Crown Prince Mohammed bin Salman said in 2018 that the international spread of Saudi Wahhabism was "rooted in the Cold War, when allies asked Saudi Arabia to use its resources to prevent inroads in Muslim countries by the Soviet Union."

Nationalist movements in some countries and regions, notably Guatemala, Indonesia and Indochina, were often allied with Communist groups or otherwise perceived to be unfriendly to Western interests. In this context, the United States and the Soviet Union increasingly competed for influence by proxy in the Third World as decolonization gained momentum in the 1950s and early 1960s. Both sides were selling armaments to gain influence. The Kremlin saw continuing territorial losses by imperial powers as presaging the eventual victory of their ideology.

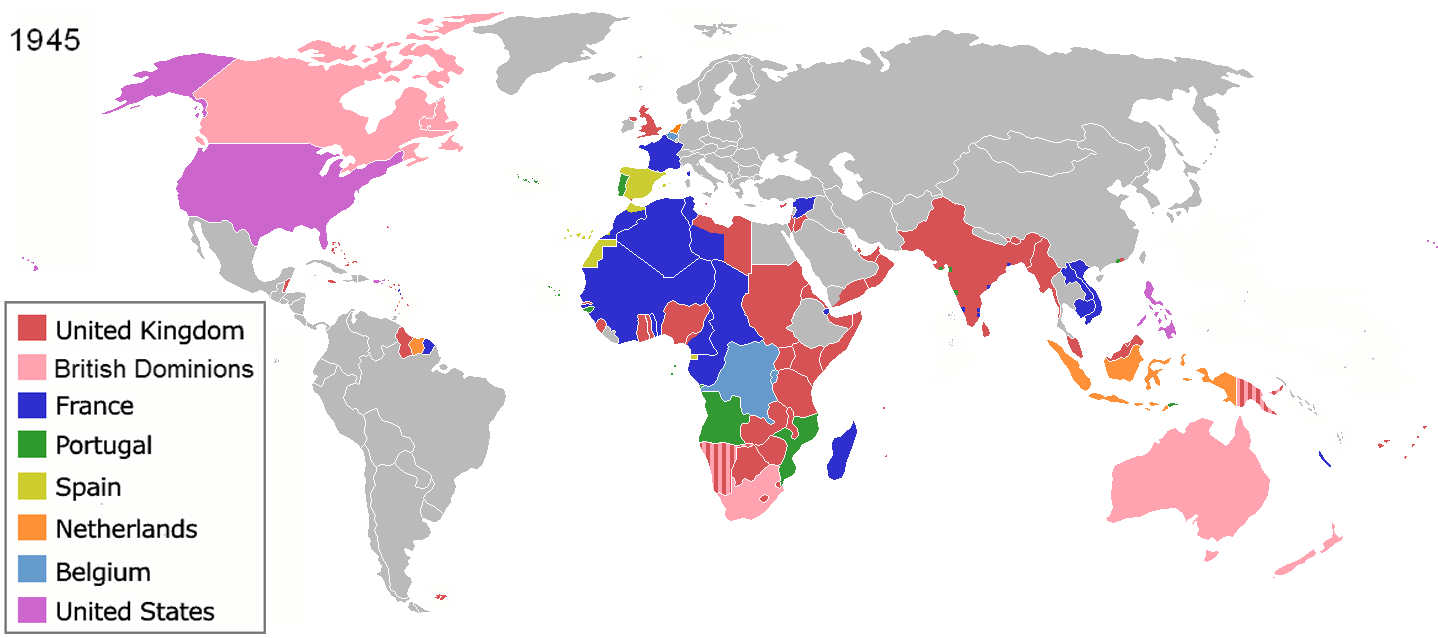
European colonial empires in Asia and Africa all collapsed in the years after 1945

The United States used the Central Intelligence Agency (CIA) to undermine neutral or hostile Third World governments and to support allied ones. In 1953, President Eisenhower implemented Operation Ajax, a covert coup operation to overthrow the Iranian prime minister, Mohammad Mosaddegh. The popularly elected Mosaddegh had been a Middle Eastern nemesis of Britain since nationalizing the British-owned Anglo-Iranian Oil Company in 1951. Winston Churchill told the United States that Mosaddegh was "increasingly turning towards Communist influence." The pro-Western shah, Mohammad Reza Pahlavi, assumed control as an autocratic monarch. The shah's policies included banning the communist Tudeh Party of Iran, and general suppression of political dissent by SAVAK, the shah's domestic security and intelligence agency.

In Guatemala, a banana republic, the 1954 Guatemalan coup d'état ousted the left-wing President Jacobo Árbenz with material CIA support. The post-Arbenz government—a military junta headed by Carlos Castillo Armas—repealed a progressive land reform law, returned nationalized property belonging to the United Fruit Company, set up a National Committee of Defense Against Communism, and decreed a Preventive Penal Law Against Communism at the request of the United States.

The non-aligned Indonesian government of Sukarno was faced with a major threat to its legitimacy beginning in 1956 when several regional commanders began to demand autonomy from Jakarta. After mediation failed, Sukarno took action to remove the dissident commanders. In February 1958, dissident military commanders in Central Sumatra (Colonel Ahmad Husein) and North Sulawesi (Colonel Ventje Sumual) declared the Revolutionary Government of the Republic of Indonesia-Permesta Movement aimed at overthrowing the Sukarno regime. They were joined by many civilian politicians from the Masyumi Party, such as Sjafruddin Prawiranegara, who were opposed to the growing influence of the communist Partai Komunis Indonesia. Due to their anti-communist rhetoric, the rebels received arms, funding, and other covert aid from the CIA until Allen Lawrence Pope, an American pilot, was shot down after a bombing raid on government-held Ambon in April 1958. The central government responded by launching airborne and seaborne military invasions of rebel strongholds at Padang and Manado. By the end of 1958, the rebels were militarily defeated, and the last remaining rebel guerilla bands surrendered by August 1961.

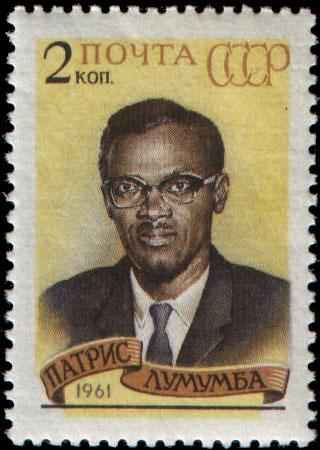
1961 USSR stamp commemorating Patrice Lumumba, assassinated prime minister of the Republic of the Congo

In the Republic of the Congo, also known as Congo-Léopoldville, newly independent from Belgium since June 1960, the Congo Crisis erupted on 5 July leading to the secession of the regions Katanga and South Kasai. CIA-backed President Joseph Kasa-Vubu ordered the dismissal of the democratically elected Prime Minister Patrice Lumumba and the Lumumba cabinet in September over massacres by the armed forces during the invasion of South Kasai and for involving Soviets in the country. Later the CIA-backed Colonel Mobutu Sese Seko quickly mobilized his forces to seize power through a military coup d'état, and worked with Western intelligence agencies to imprison Lumumba and hand him over to Katangan authorities who executed him by firing squad.

In British Guiana, the leftist People's Progressive Party (PPP) candidate Cheddi Jagan won the position of chief minister in a colonially administered election in 1953 but was quickly forced to resign from power after Britain's suspension of the still-dependent nation's constitution. Embarrassed by the landslide electoral victory of Jagan's allegedly Marxist party, the British imprisoned the PPP's leadership and maneuvered the organization into a divisive rupture in 1955. Jagan again won the colonial elections in 1957 and 1961, despite Britain's shift to a reconsideration of its view of the left-wing Jagan as a Soviet-style communist at this time. The United States pressured the British to withhold Guyana's independence until an alternative to Jagan could be identified, supported, and brought into office. In Malaya, the British colonialists suppressed the communist anti-colonial rebellion.

The civil war and the colonial war in Vietnam became internationalized and intertwined with the global Cold War when communist China and the Soviet Union recognized the Democratic Republic of Vietnam (North Vietnam), while the United States and other Western bloc countries recognized the State of Vietnam in 1950. Following the watershed defeat by the communist Viet Minh rebels at the Battle of Dien Bien Phu, the French accepted a negotiated abandonment of their neo-colonial stake in Vietnam in 1954. On June 4, France granted full sovereignty to the anti-communist State of Vietnam, an independent country within the French Union. At the Geneva Conference in July, peace accords were signed, but they ultimately resulted in Vietnam being divided at the 17th parallel north between the Communist Bloc–allied North Vietnam and the Western Bloc–allied South Vietnam. Between 1954 and 1961, Eisenhower's United States sent economic aid and military advisers to strengthen South Vietnam's government against communist efforts to destabilize it. China provided increased economic aid to North Vietnam in 1967–1968.

Many emerging nations of Asia, Africa, and Latin America rejected the pressure to choose sides in the East–West competition. In 1955, at the Bandung Conference in Indonesia, dozens of Third World governments resolved to stay out of the Cold War. The consensus reached at Bandung culminated with the creation of the Belgrade-headquartered Non-Aligned Movement in 1961. Meanwhile, Khrushchev broadened Moscow's policy to establish ties with India and other key neutral states. Independence movements in the Third World transformed the post-war order into a more pluralistic world of decolonized African and Middle Eastern nations and of rising nationalism in Asia and Latin America.

=== Sino-Soviet split ===
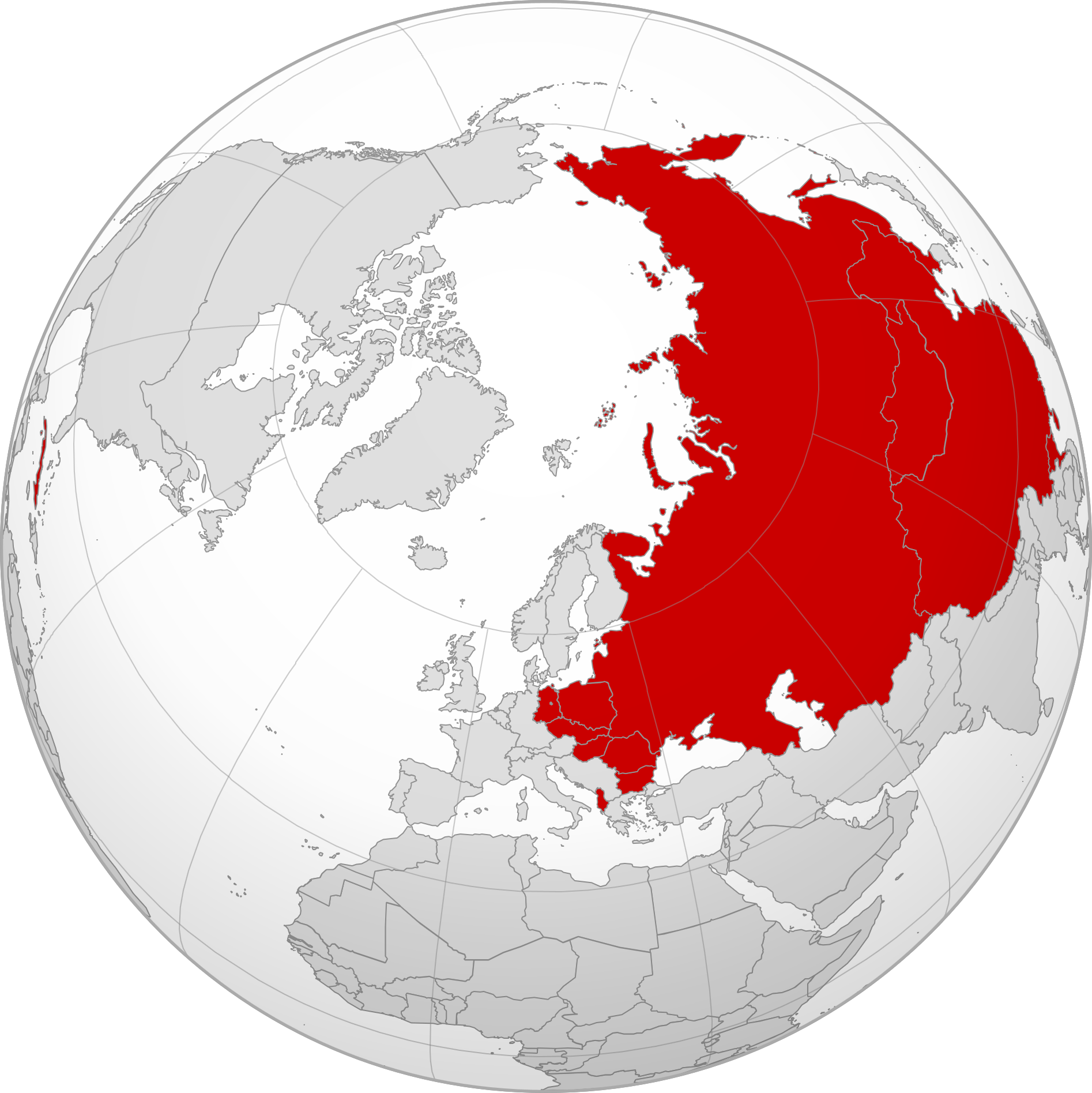
Map showing greatest territorial extent of the Soviet Union and its aligned states, 1960, after the Cuban Revolution of 1959 but before the official Sino-Soviet split of 1961 (total area: c. 35,000,000 km^{2}) (Note: 34,374,483 square kilometres (13,272,062 sq mi).)

After 1956, the Sino-Soviet alliance began to break down. Mao had defended Stalin when Khrushchev criticized him in 1956 and treated the new Soviet leader as a superficial upstart, accusing him of having lost his revolutionary edge. For his part, Khrushchev, disturbed by Mao's glib attitude toward nuclear war, referred to the Chinese leader as a "lunatic on a throne".

After this, Khrushchev made many desperate attempts to reconstitute the Sino-Soviet alliance, but Mao considered it useless and denied any proposal. The Chinese-Soviet animosity spilled out in an intra-communist propaganda war. Further on, the Soviets focused on a bitter rivalry with Mao's China for leadership of the global communist movement. Historian Lorenz M. Lüthi argues:

The Sino-Soviet split was one of the key events of the Cold War, equal in importance to the construction of the Berlin Wall, the Cuban Missile Crisis, the Second Vietnam War, and Sino-American rapprochement. The split helped to determine the framework for the Cold War period 1979–1985 in general, and influenced the course of the Second Vietnam War in particular.

=== Space Race ===
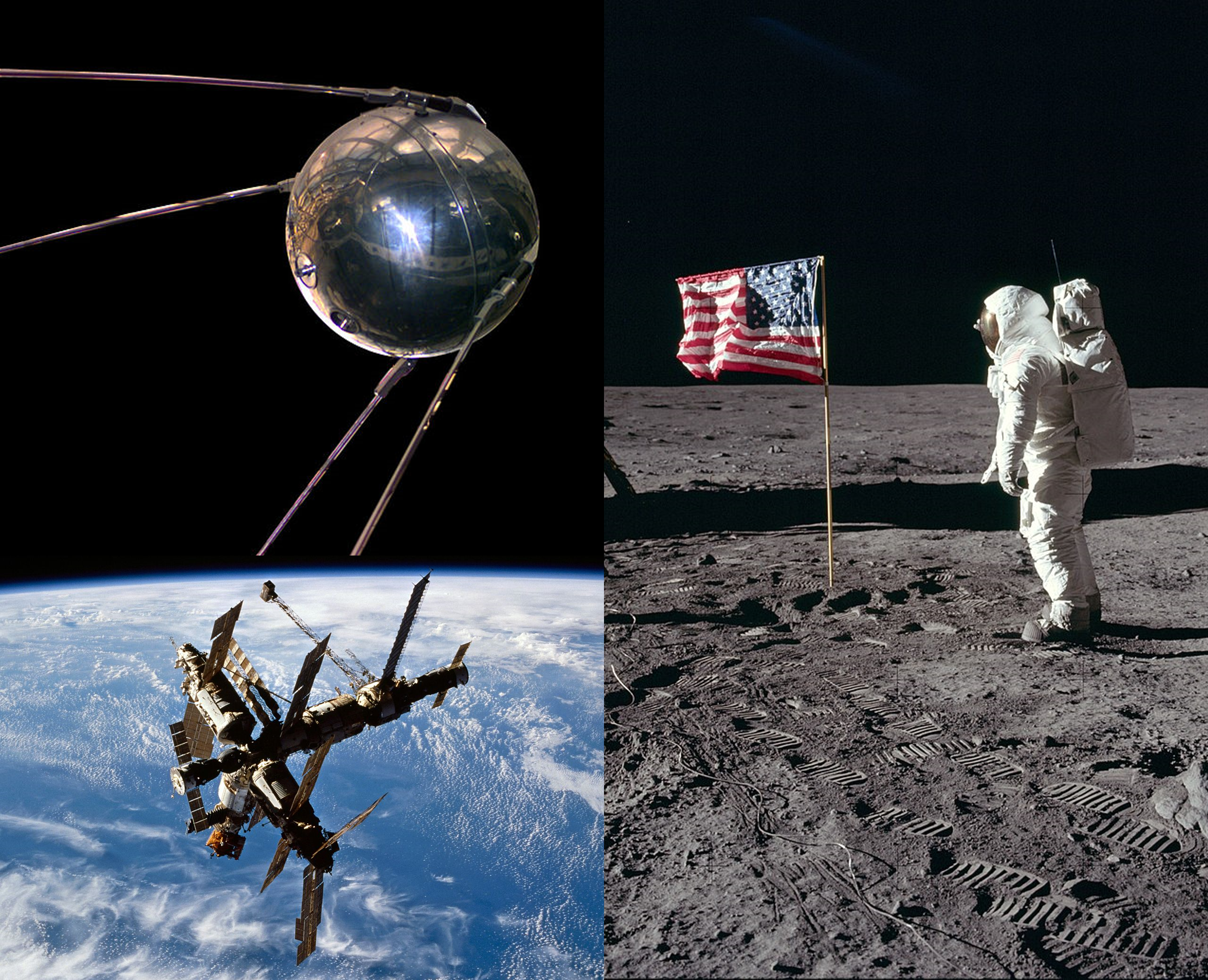
Clockwise from top left: Sputnik 1, Apollo 11 Moon landing, Space station Mir

On the nuclear weapons front, the United States and the Soviet Union pursued nuclear rearmament and developed long-range weapons with which they could strike the territory of the other. In August 1957, the Soviets successfully launched the world's first intercontinental ballistic missile (ICBM), and in October they launched the first Earth satellite, Sputnik 1. This led to what became known as the Sputnik crisis. The Central Intelligence Agency described the orbit of Sputnik 1 as a "stupendous scientific achievement" and concluded that the USSR had likely perfected an intercontinental ballistic missile (ICBM) capable of reaching 'any desired target with accuracy'.

The launch of Sputnik inaugurated the Space Race. This led to a series of historic space exploration milestones, and most notably the Apollo Moon landings from 1969 by the United States, which astronaut Frank Borman later described as "just a battle in the Cold War." The public's reaction in the Soviet Union was mixed. The Soviet government limited the release of information about the lunar landing, which affected the reaction. A portion of the populace did not give it any attention, and another portion was angered by it. A major Cold War element of the Space Race was satellite reconnaissance, as well as signals intelligence to gauge which aspects of the space programs had military capabilities. The Soviet Salyut programme, conducted in the 1970s and 1980s, put a crewed space station in long term orbit; two of the successful installations to the station were covers for secret military Almaz reconnaissance stations: Salyut 3 and Salyut 5.

During the whole duration of the cold war, the US and the USSR represented the largest and dominant space powers of the world. Despite their fierce competition, both nations signed international space treaties in the 1960s which would limit the militarization of space.

The first research of anti-satellite weapon technology also came about during this period.

Later, the US and USSR pursued some cooperation in space as part of détente, notably the Apollo–Soyuz orbital rendezvous and docking.

=== Aftermath of the Cuban Revolution ===
In Cuba, the 26th of July Movement, led by young revolutionaries Fidel Castro and Che Guevara, seized power in the Cuban Revolution on 1 January 1959. Although Fidel Castro's first refused to categorize his new government as socialist and repeatedly denying being a communist, Castro appointed Marxists to senior government and military positions.

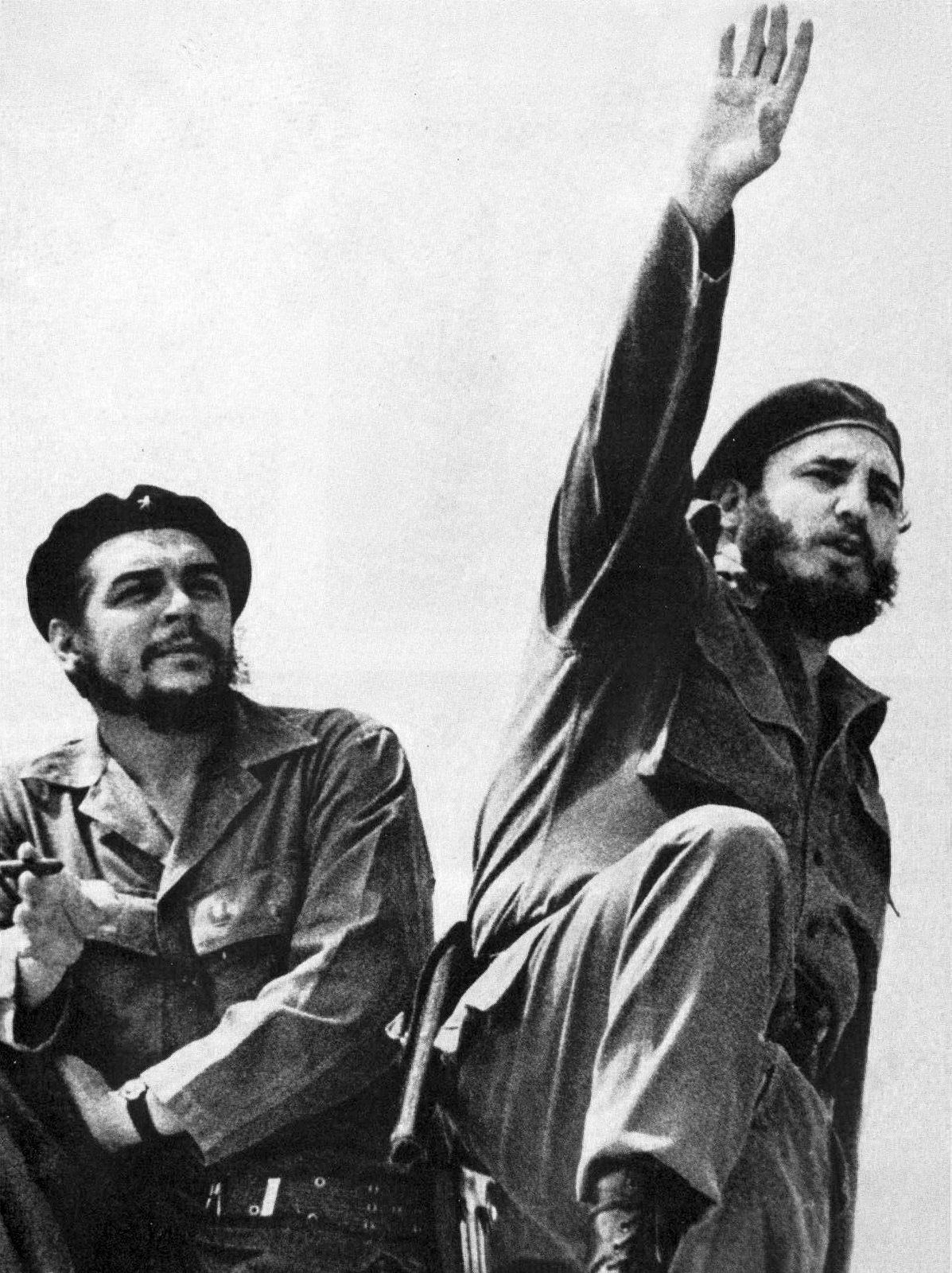
Che Guevara (left) and Fidel Castro (right) in 1961

Diplomatic relations between Cuba and the United States continued for some time after Batista's fall, but President Eisenhower deliberately left the capital to avoid meeting Castro during the latter's trip to Washington, D.C. in April, leaving Vice President Richard Nixon to conduct the meeting in his place. Cuba began negotiating for arms purchases from the Eastern Bloc in March 1960. The same month, Eisenhower gave approval to CIA plans and funding to overthrow Castro.

In January 1961, just prior to leaving office, Eisenhower formally severed relations with the Cuban government. That April, the administration of newly elected American President John F. Kennedy mounted the unsuccessful CIA-organized ship-borne invasion of the island by Cuban exiles at Playa Girón and Playa Larga in Santa Clara Province—a failure that publicly humiliated the United States. Castro responded by publicly embracing Marxism–Leninism, and the Soviet Union pledged to provide further support. In December, the US government began a violent campaign of terrorist attacks against civilians in Cuba, and covert operations and sabotage against the administration, in an attempt to overthrow the Cuban government. (Note: (Note: Prados & Jimenez-Bacardi 2019: "The memorandum showed no concern for international law or the unspoken nature of these operations as terrorist attacks."))

=== Berlin Crisis of 1961 ===
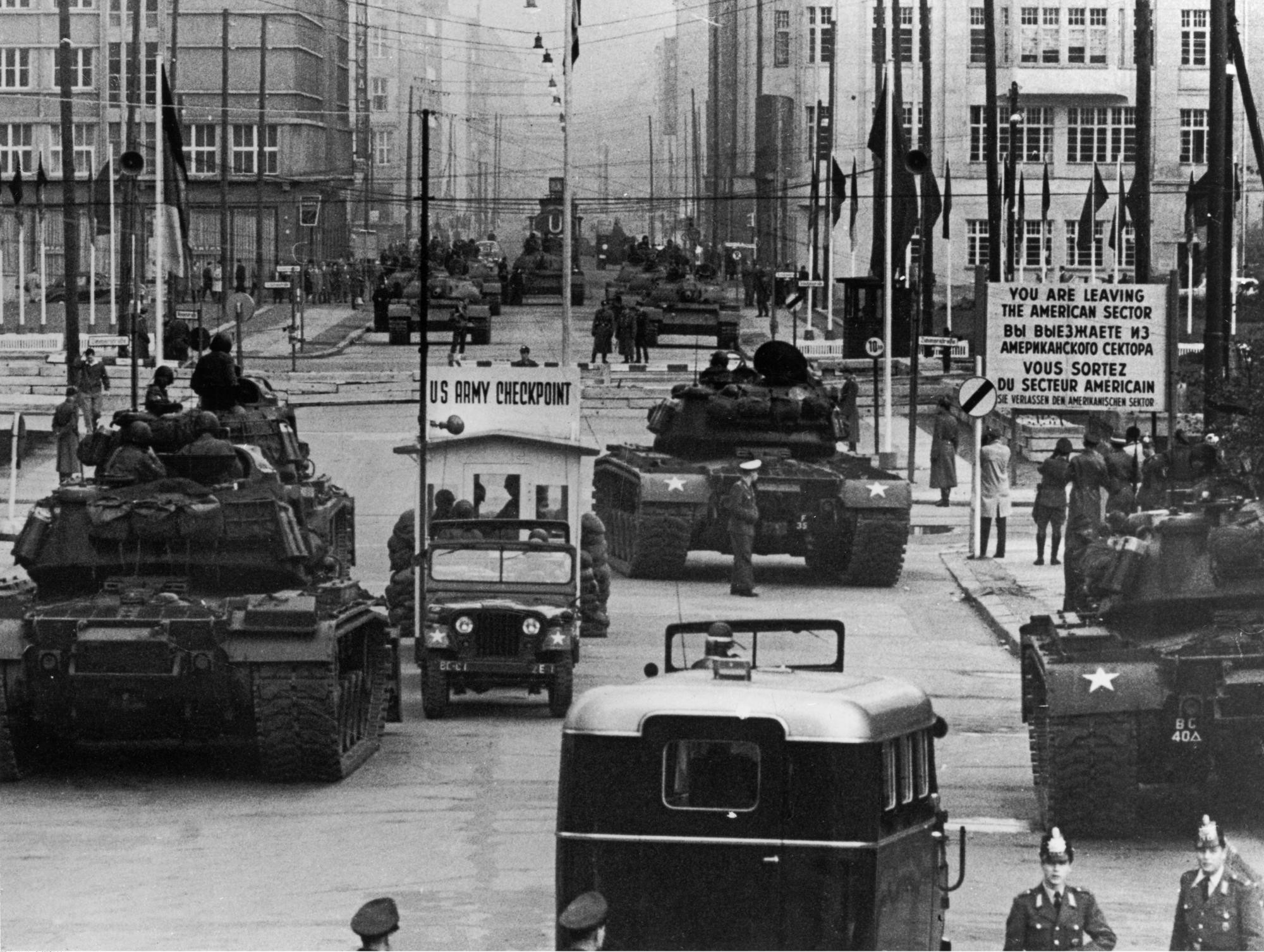
Soviet and American tanks face each other at Checkpoint Charlie during the Berlin Crisis of 1961

The Berlin Crisis of 1961 was the last major incident in the Cold War regarding the status of Berlin and post–World War II Germany. By the early 1950s, the Soviet approach to restricting emigration movement was emulated by most of the rest of the Eastern Bloc. However, hundreds of thousands of East Germans annually emigrated to free and prosperous West Germany through a "loophole" in the system that existed between East Berlin and West Berlin.

The emigration resulted in a massive "brain drain" from East Germany to West Germany of younger educated professionals, such that nearly 20% of East Germany's population had migrated to West Germany by 1961. That June, the Soviet Union issued a new ultimatum demanding the withdrawal of Allied forces from West Berlin. The request was rebuffed, but the United States now limited its security guarantees to West Berlin. On 13 August, East Germany erected a barbed-wire barrier that would eventually be expanded through construction into the Berlin Wall, effectively closing the loophole and preventing its citizens from fleeing to the West.

=== Cuban Missile Crisis and Khrushchev's ousting ===
The Kennedy administration continued seeking ways to oust Castro following the Bay of Pigs invasion, experimenting with various ways of covertly facilitating the overthrow of the Cuban government. Significant hopes were placed on the program of terrorist attacks and other destabilization operations known as Operation Mongoose, which was devised under the Kennedy administration in 1961. Khrushchev learned of the project in February 1962, and preparations to install Soviet nuclear missiles in Cuba were undertaken in response.

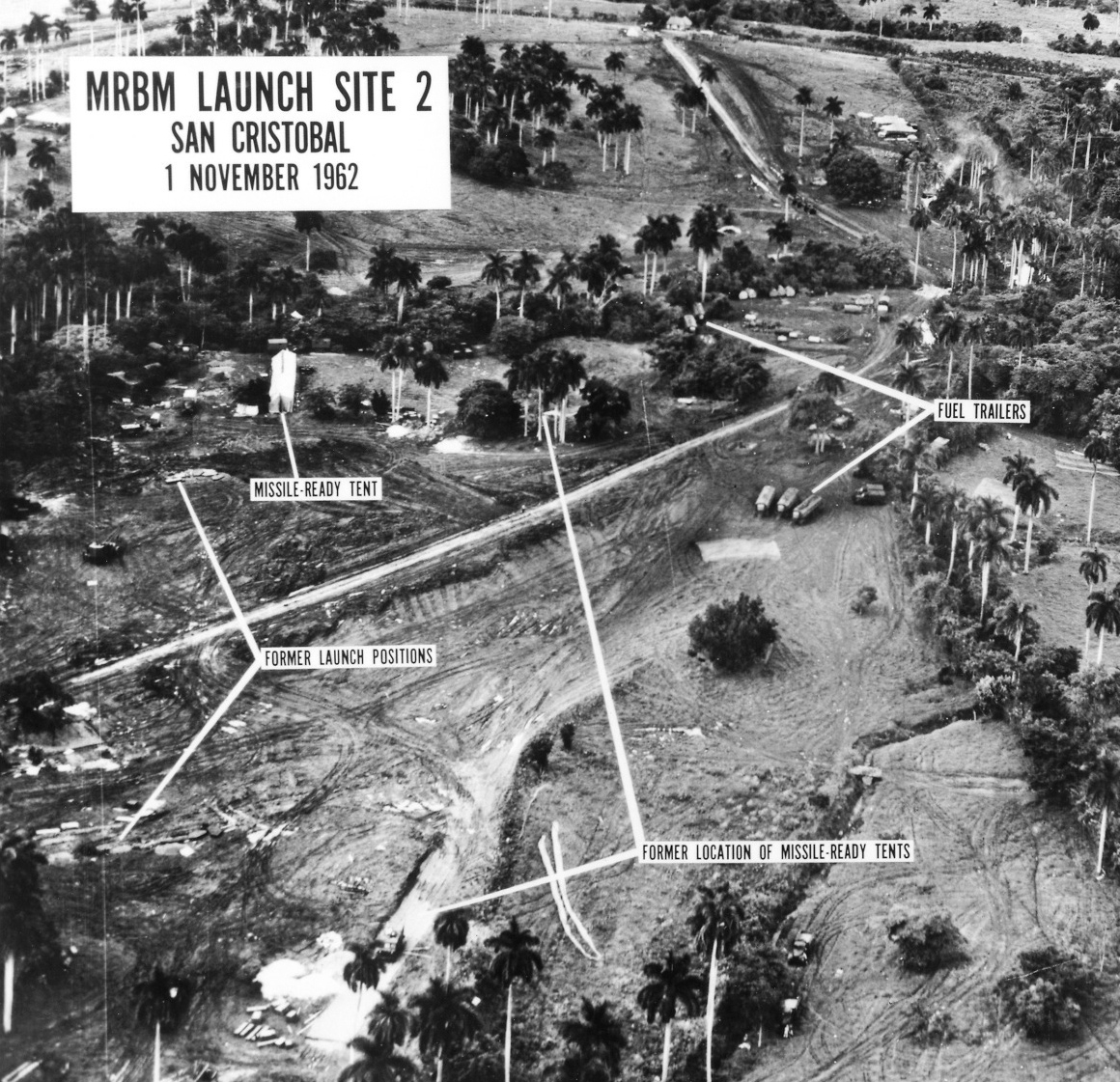
Aerial photograph of a Soviet missile site in Cuba, taken by a US spy aircraft, 1 November 1962

Alarmed, Kennedy considered various reactions. He ultimately responded to the installation of nuclear missiles in Cuba with a naval blockade, and he presented an ultimatum to the Soviets. Khrushchev backed down from a confrontation, and the Soviet Union removed the missiles in return for a public American pledge not to invade Cuba again as well as a covert deal to remove US missiles from Turkey.

The Cuban Missile Crisis (October – November 1962) brought the world closer to nuclear war than ever before. The aftermath led to efforts in the nuclear arms race at nuclear disarmament and improving relations, although the Cold War's first arms control agreement, the Antarctic Treaty, had come into force in 1961. (Note: National Research Council Committee on Antarctic Policy and Science, p. 33)

The compromise embarrassed Khrushchev and the Soviet Union because the withdrawal of US missiles from Italy and Turkey was a secret deal between Kennedy and Khrushchev, and the Soviets were seen as retreating from circumstances that they had started. In 1964, Khrushchev's Kremlin colleagues managed to oust him, but allowed him a peaceful retirement. He was accused of rudeness and incompetence, and John Lewis Gaddis argues that he was also blamed with ruining Soviet agriculture, bringing the world to the brink of nuclear war, and becoming an "international embarrassment" when he authorized construction of the Berlin Wall. According to Dobrynin, the top Soviet leadership took the Cuban outcome as "a blow to its prestige bordering on humiliation".

== From confrontation to détente (1962–1979) ==
In the course of the 1960s and 1970s, Cold War participants struggled to adjust to a new, more complicated pattern of international relations in which the world was no longer divided into two clearly opposed blocs. From the beginning of the post-war period with American help, Western Europe and Japan rapidly recovered from the destruction of World War II and sustained strong economic growth throughout the 1950s and 1960s, with per capita GDPs approaching those of the United States, while Eastern Bloc economies stagnated.

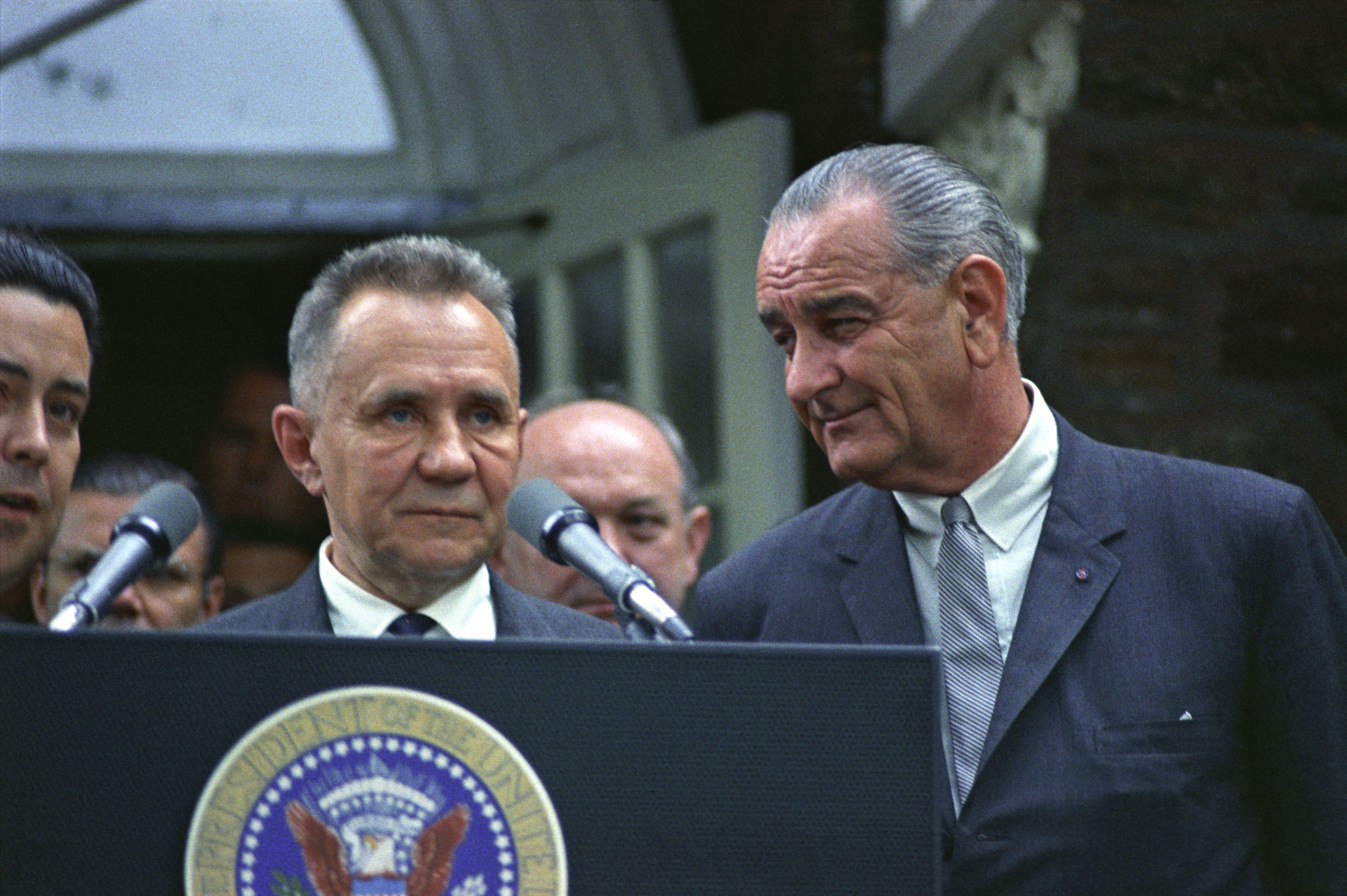
Soviet Premier Alexei Kosygin with US President Lyndon B. Johnson at the 1967 Glassboro Summit Conference

In Indonesia, the hardline anti-communist General Suharto wrested control from predecessor Sukarno in an attempt to establish a "New Order". From 1965 to 1966, with the aid of the US and other Western governments, (Note: Robinson 2018, p. 203: "A US Embassy official in Jakarta, Robert Martens, had supplied the Indonesian Army with lists containing the names of thousands of PKI officials in the months after the alleged coup attempt. According to the journalist Kathy Kadane, "As many as 5,000 names were furnished over a period of months to the Army there, and the Americans later checked off the names of those who had been killed or captured." Despite Martens later denials of any such intent, these actions almost certainly aided in the death or detention of many innocent people. They also sent a powerful message that the US government agreed with and supported the army's campaign against the PKI, even as that campaign took its terrible toll in human lives.") (Note: Simpson 2010, p. 193: "Washington did everything in its power to encourage and facilitate the army-led massacre of alleged PKI members, and U.S. officials worried only that the killing of the party's unarmed supporters might not go far enough, permitting Sukarno to return to power and frustrate the [Johnson] Administration's emerging plans for a post-Sukarno Indonesia. This was efficacious terror, an essential building block of the neoliberal policies that the West would attempt to impose on Indonesia after Sukarno's ouster.") the military led the mass killing of more than 500,000 members and sympathizers of the Indonesian Communist Party and other leftist organizations, and detained hundreds of thousands in prison camps under inhumane conditions. A top-secret CIA report stated that the massacres "rank as one of the worst mass murders of the 20th century, along with the Soviet purges of the 1930s, the Nazi mass murders during the Second World War, and the Maoist bloodbath of the early 1950s." These killings served US interests and constitute a major turning point in the Cold War as the balance of power shifted in Southeast Asia.

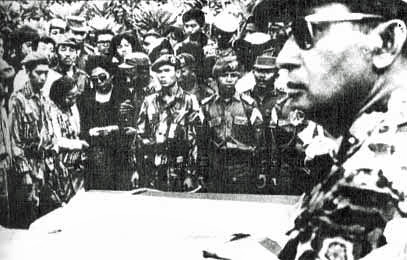
Suharto of Indonesia attending funeral of five generals slain in 30 September Movement, 2 October 1965

The Vietnam War descended into a quagmire for the United States, leading to a decline in international prestige and economic stability, derailing arms agreements, and provoking domestic unrest. America's withdrawal from the war led it to embrace a policy of détente with both China and the Soviet Union.

NATO and Warsaw Pact troop strengths in Europe in 1973

Backed by the Kampuchean United Front for National Salvation, an organization of Khmer pro-Soviet Communists and Khmer Rouge defectors, Vietnam invaded Cambodia on 22 December 1978. The invasion succeeded in deposing Pol Pot, but the new state struggled to gain international recognition beyond the Soviet Bloc sphere. Despite the international outcry at the Pol Pot regime's gross human rights violations, representatives of the Khmer Rouge were allowed to be seated in the UN General Assembly, with strong support from China, the Western powers, and the member countries of ASEAN. Following the destruction of the Khmer Rouge, the national reconstruction of Cambodia was hampered, and Vietnam suffered a punitive Chinese attack. Although unable to deter Vietnam from ousting Pol Pot, China demonstrated that its Cold War communist adversary, the Soviet Union, was unable to protect its Vietnamese ally. Former U.S. Secretary of State Henry Kissinger wrote that "China succeeded in exposing the limits of...[Soviet] strategic reach" and speculated that the desire to "compensate for their ineffectuality" contributed to the Soviets' decision to intervene in Afghanistan a year later.

In the 1973 oil crisis, Organization of Petroleum Exporting Countries (OPEC) cut their petroleum output. This raised oil prices and hurt Western economies, but helped the Soviet Union by generating a huge flow of money from its oil sales.

As a result of the oil crisis, combined with the growing influence of Third World alignments, such as OPEC and the Non-Aligned Movement, less powerful countries had more room to assert their independence and often showed themselves resistant to pressure from either superpower. Meanwhile, Moscow was forced to turn its attention inward to deal with the Soviet Union's deep-seated domestic economic problems. During this period, Soviet leaders such as Leonid Brezhnev and Alexei Kosygin embraced the notion of détente.

=== Vietnam War ===
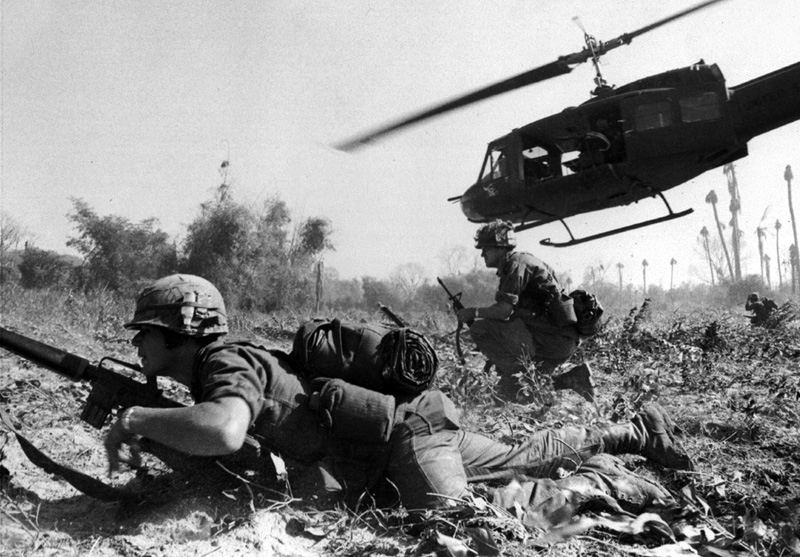
US combat operations during the Battle of Ia Drang, South Vietnam, November 1965

Under President John F. Kennedy, US troop levels in Vietnam grew from just under a thousand in 1959 to 16,000 in 1963. South Vietnamese President Ngo Dinh Diem's heavy-handed crackdown on Buddhist monks in 1963 led the US to endorse a deadly military coup against Diem. The war escalated further in 1964 following the controversial Gulf of Tonkin incident, in which a US destroyer was alleged to have clashed with North Vietnamese fast attack craft. The Gulf of Tonkin Resolution gave President Lyndon B. Johnson broad authorization to increase US military presence, deploying ground combat units for the first time and increasing troop levels to 184,000. Soviet leader Leonid Brezhnev responded by reversing Khrushchev's policy of disengagement and increasing aid to the North Vietnamese, hoping to entice the North from its pro-Chinese position. The USSR discouraged further escalation of the war, however, providing just enough military assistance to tie up American forces. From this point, the People's Army of Vietnam (PAVN) engaged in more conventional warfare with US and South Vietnamese forces.

The Tet Offensive of 1968 proved to be the turning point of the war. Despite years of American tutelage and aid, the South Vietnamese forces were unable to withstand the communist offensive and the task fell to US forces instead. At the same time, in 1963–1965, American domestic politics saw the triumph of liberalism. According to historian Joseph Crespino:

It has become a staple of twentieth-century historiography that Cold War concerns were at the root of a number of progressive political accomplishments in the postwar period: a high progressive marginal tax rate that helped fund the arms race and contributed to broad income equality; bipartisan support for far-reaching civil rights legislation that transformed politics and society in the American South, which had long given the lie to America's egalitarian ethos; bipartisan support for overturning an explicitly racist immigration system that had been in place since the 1920s; and free health care for the elderly and the poor, a partial fulfillment of one of the unaccomplished goals of the New Deal era. The list could go on.

=== Nuclear testing and Use of Outer-Space treaties ===
The Partial Nuclear Test Ban Treaty was signed on August 5, 1963, by the United States, the Soviet Union, and over 100 other nations. This treaty banned nuclear weapons tests in the atmosphere, outer space, and underwater, restricting such tests to underground environments. The treaty followed heightened concerns over the militarization of space, amplified by the United States' Starfish Prime test in 1962, which involved the detonation of a nuclear device in the upper atmosphere.

To further delineate the peaceful use of outer space, the United Nations facilitated the drafting of the Treaty on Principles Governing the Activities of States in the Exploration and Use of Outer Space, including the Moon and Other Celestial Bodies, commonly known as the Outer Space Treaty. Signed on January 27, 1967, by the United States, the Soviet Union, and the United Kingdom, it entered into force on October 10, 1967. The treaty established space as a domain to be used exclusively for peaceful purposes, prohibiting the placement of nuclear weapons or any other weapons of mass destruction in orbit or on celestial bodies.

=== Invasion of Czechoslovakia ===
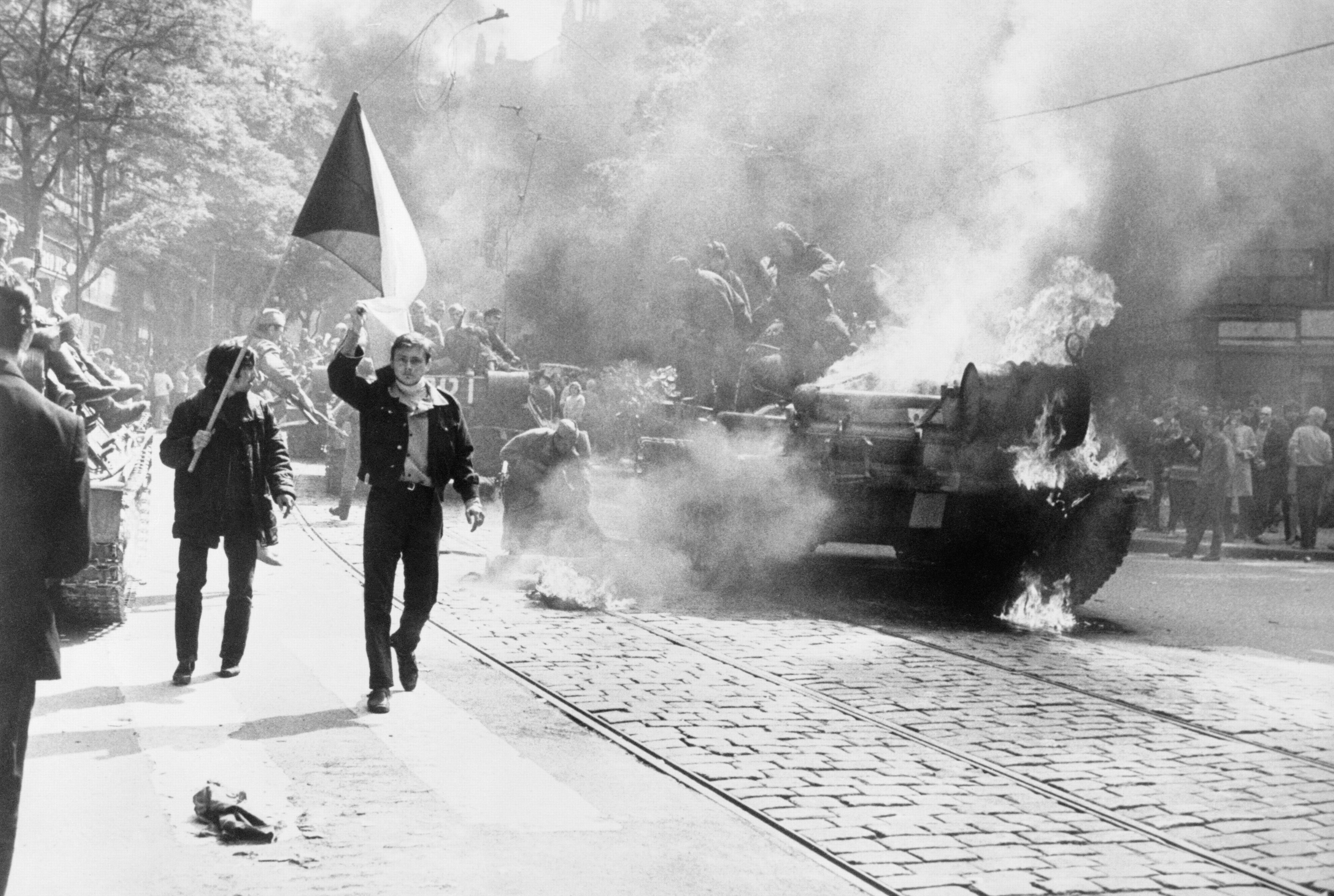
The invasion of Czechoslovakia by the Soviet Union in 1968 was one of the biggest military operations on European soil since World War II

In 1968, a period of political liberalization took place in Czechoslovakia called the Prague Spring. An "Action Program" of reforms included increasing freedom of the press, freedom of speech and freedom of movement, along with an economic emphasis on consumer goods, the possibility of a multiparty government, limitations on the power of the secret police, and potential withdrawal from the Warsaw Pact.

In answer to the Prague Spring, on 20 August 1968, the Soviet Army, together with most of their Warsaw Pact allies, invaded Czechoslovakia. The invasion was followed by a wave of emigration, including an estimated 70,000 Czechs and Slovaks initially fleeing, with the total eventually reaching 300,000. The invasion sparked intense protests from Yugoslavia, Romania, China, and from Western European countries.

=== Sino-Soviet split and Nixon-China visit ===
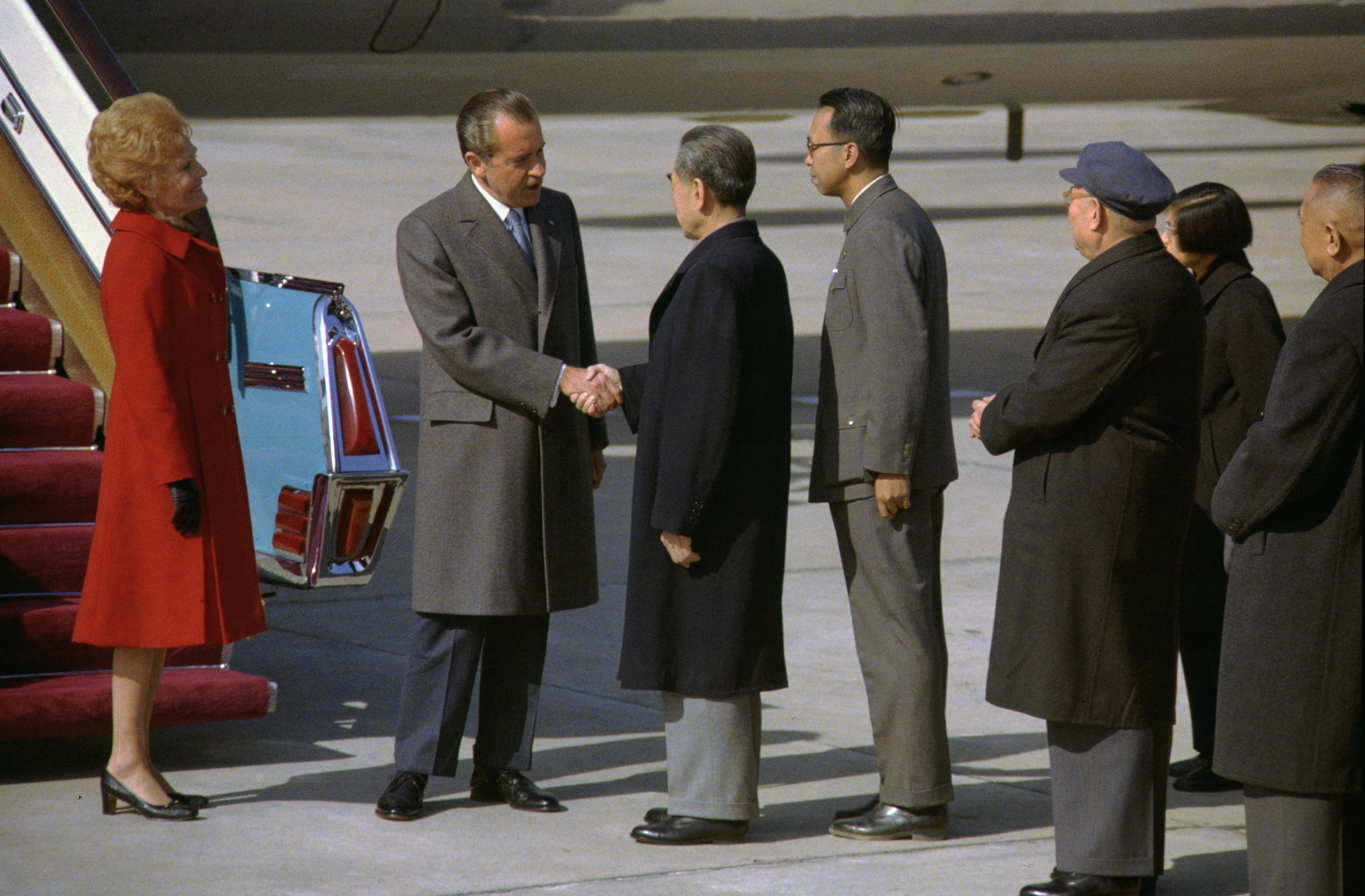
US President Richard Nixon shakes hands with Chinese Premier Zhou Enlai at Beijing Capital International Airport

As a result of the Sino-Soviet split, tensions along the Chinese–Soviet border reached their peak in 1969, when the Soviet planned to launch a large-scale nuclear strike against China. United States President Richard Nixon intervened, and decided to use the conflict to shift the balance of power towards the West in the Cold War through a policy of rapproachment with China, which began with his 1972 visit to China and culminated in 1979 with the signing of the Joint Communiqué on the Establishment of Diplomatic Relations by President Carter and Chinese Communist Party leader Deng Xiaoping.

=== Nixon, Brezhnev, and détente ===
Although indirect conflict between Cold War powers continued through the late 1960s and early 1970s, tensions were beginning to ease. Following the ousting of Khrushchev, another period of collective leadership ensued, consisting of Leonid Brezhnev as general secretary, Alexei Kosygin as Premier and Nikolai Podgorny as Chairman of the Presidium, lasting until Brezhnev established himself in the early 1970s as the preeminent Soviet leader.

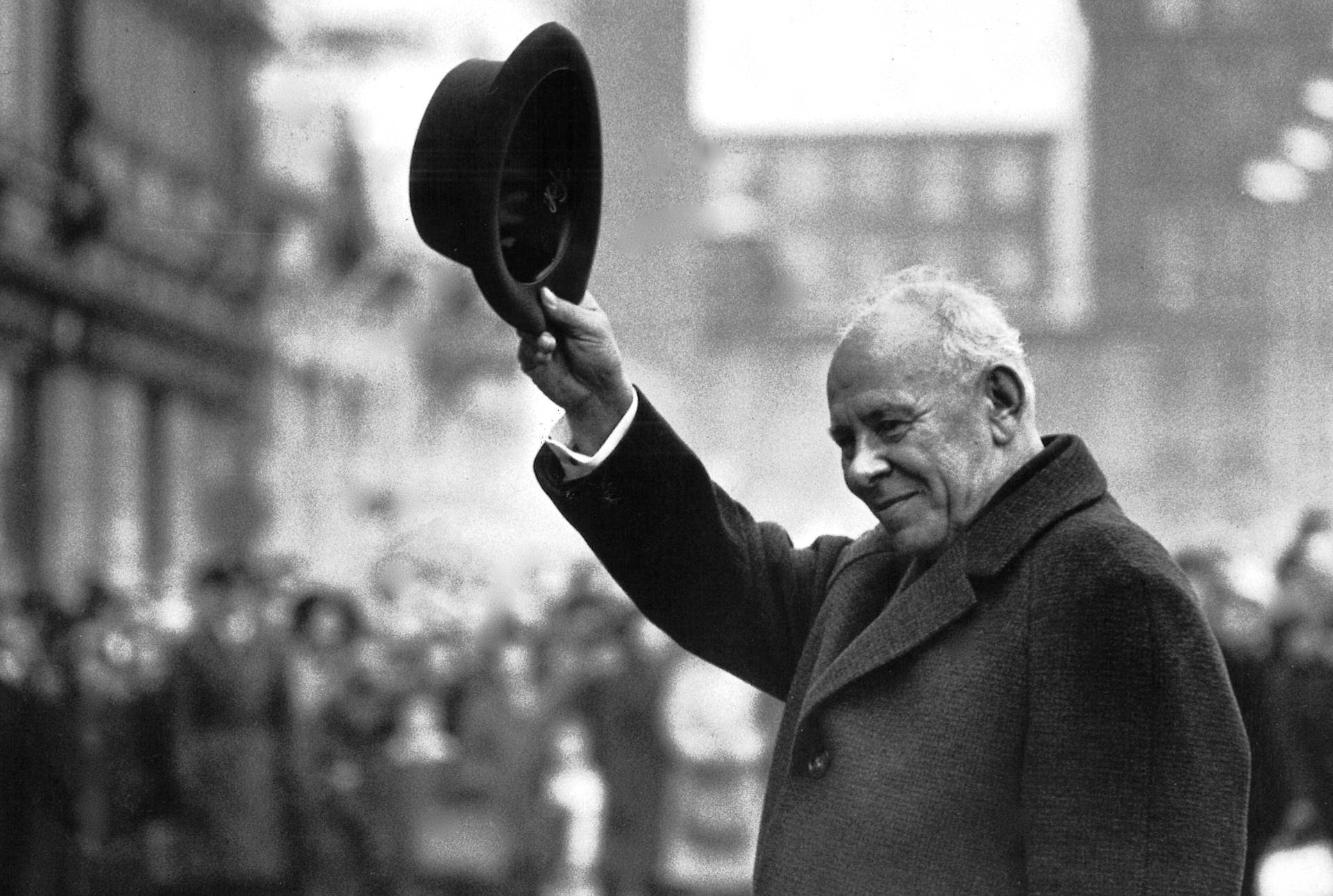
Nikolai Podgorny visiting Tampere, Finland on 16 October 1969

Following his visit to China, Nixon met with Soviet leaders in Moscow. These Strategic Arms Limitation Talks resulted in landmark arms control treaties. These aimed to limit the development of costly anti-ballistic missiles and nuclear missiles.

Nixon and Brezhnev proclaimed a new era of "peaceful coexistence" and established the groundbreaking new policy of détente (or cooperation) between the superpowers. Meanwhile, Brezhnev attempted to revive the Soviet economy, which was declining in part because of heavy military expenditures. The Soviet Union's military budget in the 1970s was massive, 40–60% of the federal budget and 15% of GDP. Between 1972 and 1974, the two sides also agreed to strengthen their economic ties, including agreements for increased trade. As a result of their meetings, détente would replace the hostility of the Cold War and the two countries would live mutually. These developments coincided with Bonn's Ostpolitik policy formulated by the West German Chancellor Willy Brandt, an effort to normalize relations between West Germany and Eastern Europe. Other agreements were concluded to stabilize the situation in Europe, culminating in the Helsinki Accords signed at the Conference on Security and Co-operation in Europe in 1975.

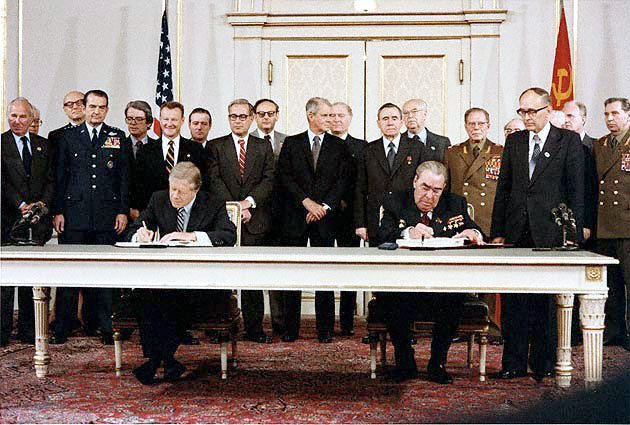
Soviet general secretary Leonid Brezhnev and US President Jimmy Carter sign the SALT II arms limitation treaty in Vienna on 18 June 1979

The Helsinki Accords, in which the Soviets promised to grant free elections in Europe, has been called a major concession to ensure peace by the Soviets. In practice, the Soviet government significantly curbed the rule of law, civil liberties, protection of law, and guarantees of property, which were considered examples of "bourgeois morality" by Soviet legal theorists such as Andrey Vyshinsky. The Soviet Union signed legally-binding human rights documents, such as the International Covenant on Civil and Political Rights in 1973 and the Helsinki Accords in 1975, but they were neither widely known or accessible to people living under communist rule, nor were they taken seriously by the communist authorities. Human rights activists in the Soviet Union were regularly subjected to harassment, repressions and arrests.

The pro-Soviet American business magnate Armand Hammer of Occidental Petroleum often mediated trade relations. Author Daniel Yergin, in his book The Prize, writes that Hammer "ended up as a go-between for five Soviet General Secretaries and seven US Presidents." Hammer had extensive business relationship in the Soviet Union stretching back to the 1920s with Lenin's approval. According to Christian Science Monitor in 1980, "although his business dealings with the Soviet Union were cut short when Stalin came to power, he had more or less single-handedly laid the groundwork for the [1980] state of Western trade with the Soviet Union."

Kissinger and Nixon were "realists" who deemphasized idealistic goals like anti-communism or promotion of democracy worldwide because those goals were too expensive in terms of America's economic capabilities. They rejected "idealism" as impractical and too expensive, and neither man showed much sensitivity to the plight of people living under communism. Kissinger's realism fell out of fashion as idealism returned to American foreign policy with Carter's moralism emphasizing human rights, and Reagan's rollback strategy aimed at destroying communism.

=== Late 1970s deterioration of relations ===
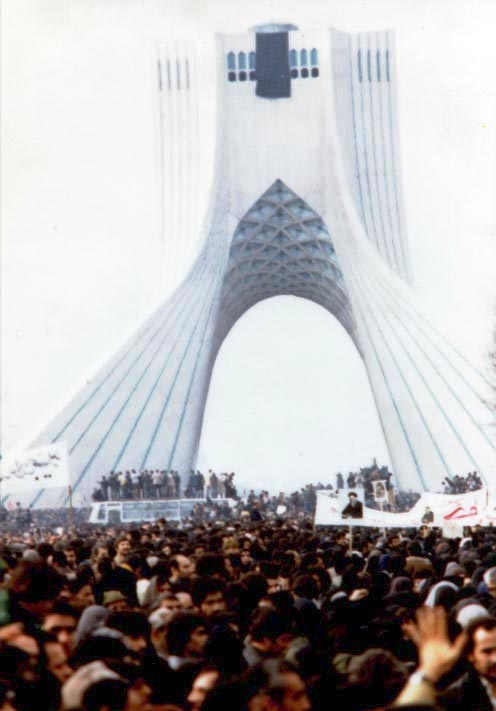
Iranian people protesting against the Pahlavi dynasty, during the Iranian Revolution

In the 1970s, the KGB, led by Yuri Andropov, continued to persecute distinguished Soviet dissidents, such as Aleksandr Solzhenitsyn and Andrei Sakharov, who were criticising the Soviet leadership in harsh terms. Indirect conflict between the superpowers continued through this period of détente in the Third World, particularly during political crises in the Middle East, Chile, Ethiopia, and Angola.

In 1973, Nixon announced his administration was committed to seeking most favored nation trade status with the USSR, which was challenged by Congress in the Jackson-Vanik Amendment. The United States had long linked trade with the Soviet Union to its foreign policy toward the Soviet Union and, especially since the early 1980s, to Soviet human rights policies. The Jackson-Vanik Amendment, which was attached to the 1974 Trade Act, linked the granting of most-favored-nation to the USSR to the right of persecuted Soviet Jews to emigrate. Because the Soviet Union refused the right of emigration to Jewish refuseniks, the ability of the President to apply most-favored nation trade status to the Soviet Union was restricted.

Although President Jimmy Carter tried to place another limit on the arms race with a SALT II agreement in 1979, his efforts were undermined by the other events that year, including the Iranian Revolution and the Nicaraguan Revolution, which both ousted pro-US governments, and his retaliation against the Soviet coup in Afghanistan in December.

== Renewal of tensions (1979–1985) ==
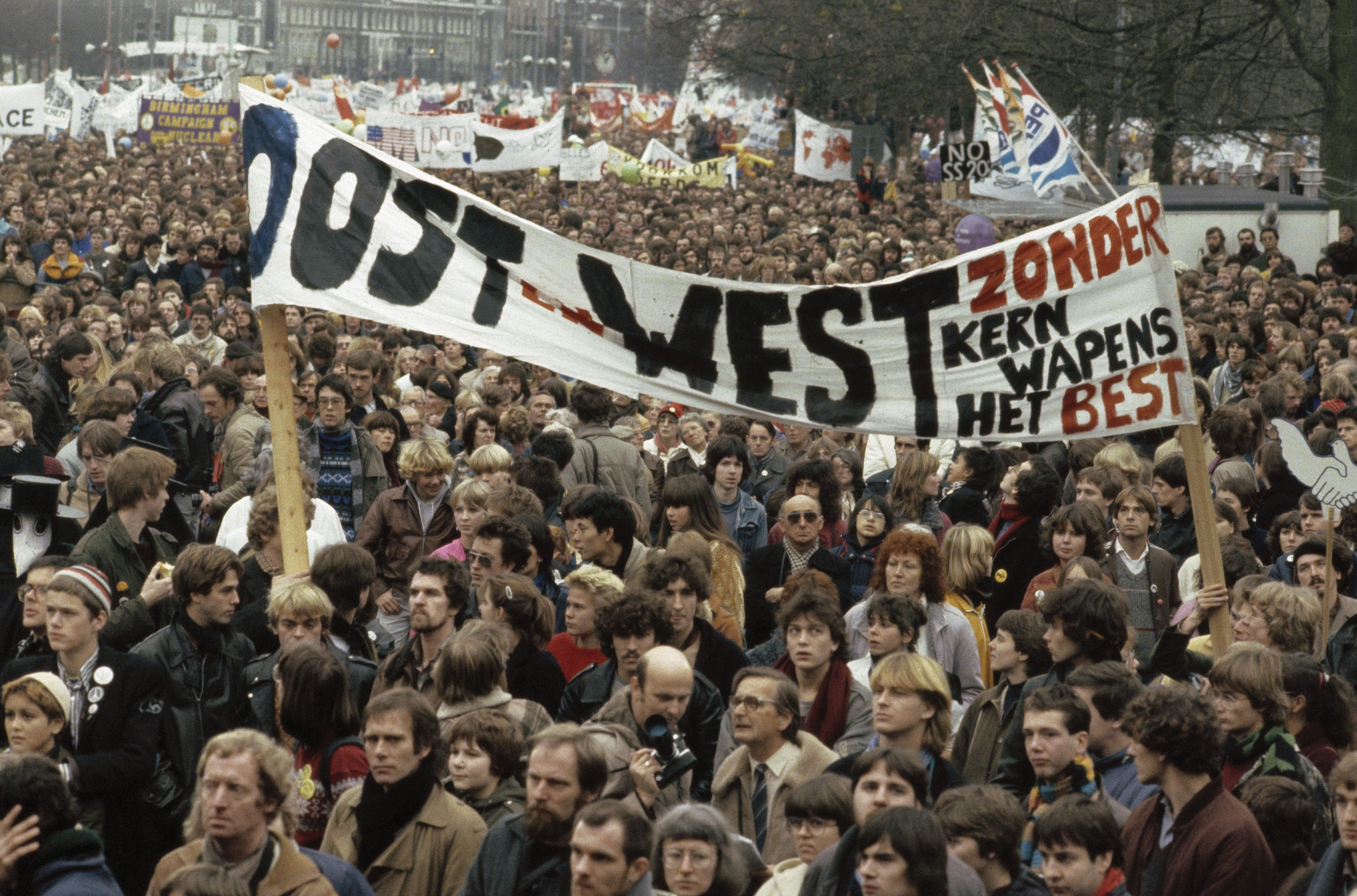
Protest in Amsterdam against the deployment of Pershing II missiles in Europe, 1981

The period in the late 1970s and early 1980s showed an intensive reawakening of Cold War tensions and conflicts. Tensions greatly increased between the major powers with both sides becoming more militant. Diggins says, "Reagan went all out to fight the second cold war, by supporting counterinsurgencies in the third world." Cox says, "The intensity of this 'second' Cold War was as great as its duration was short."

=== Soviet invasion of Afghanistan and end of détente ===
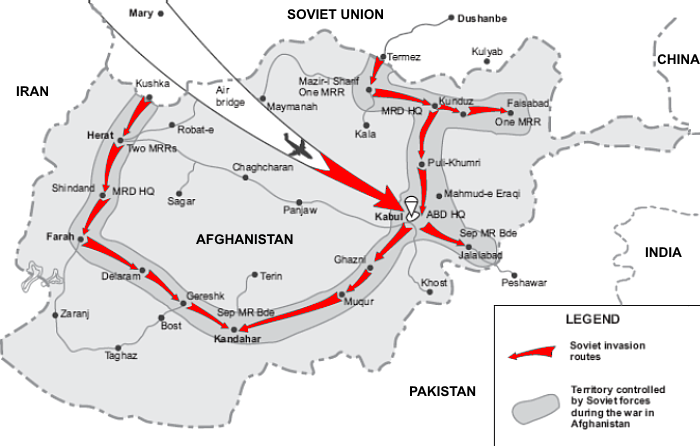
The Soviet invasion during Operation Storm-333 on 26 December 1979

In April 1978, the communist People's Democratic Party of Afghanistan (PDPA) seized power in Afghanistan in the Saur Revolution. Within months, opponents of the communist regime launched an uprising in eastern Afghanistan that quickly expanded into a civil war waged by guerrilla mujahideen against government forces countrywide. The Islamic Unity of Afghanistan Mujahideen insurgents received military training and weapons in neighboring Pakistan and China, while the Soviet Union sent thousands of military advisers to support the PDPA government. Meanwhile, increasing friction between the competing factions of the PDPA—the dominant Khalq and the more moderate Parcham—resulted in the dismissal of Parchami cabinet members and the arrest of Parchami military officers under the pretext of a Parchami coup. By mid-1979, the United States had started a covert program to assist the mujahideen.

In September 1979, Khalqist President Nur Muhammad Taraki was assassinated in a coup within the PDPA orchestrated by fellow Khalq member Hafizullah Amin, who assumed the presidency. Distrusted by the Soviets, Amin was assassinated by Soviet special forces during Operation Storm-333 in December 1979. Afghan forces suffered losses during the Soviet operation; 30 Afghan palace guards and over 300 army guards were killed while another 150 were captured. In the aftermath of the operation, a total of 1,700 Afghan soldiers who surrendered to Soviet forces were taken as prisoners, and the Soviets installed Babrak Karmal, the leader of the PDPA's Parcham faction, as Amin's successor. Veterans of the Soviet Union's Alpha Group have stated that Operation Storm-333 was one of the most successful in the unit's history. Documents released following the dissolution of the Soviet Union in the 1990s revealed that the Soviet leadership believed Amin had secret contacts within the American embassy in Kabul and "was capable of reaching an agreement with the United States"; however, allegations of Amin colluding with the Americans have been widely discredited. (Note: Coll 2004, pp. 47–49: "Frustrated and hoping to discredit him, the KGB initially planted false stories that Amin was a CIA agent. In the autumn these rumors rebounded on the KGB in a strange case of "blowback," the term used by spies to describe planted propaganda that filters back to confuse the country that first set the story loose.") (Note: Jones, S. 2010, pp. 16–17: "'It was total nonsense,' said the CIA's Graham Fuller. 'I would have been thrilled to have those kinds of contacts with Amin, but they didn't exist.'") The PDBA was tasked to fill the vacuum and carried out a purge of Amin supporters. Soviet troops were deployed to put Afghanistan under Soviet control with Karmal in more substantial numbers, although the Soviet government did not expect to do most of the fighting in Afghanistan. As a result, however, the Soviets were now directly involved in what had been a domestic war in Afghanistan.

Carter responded to the Soviet invasion by withdrawing the SALT II treaty from ratification, imposing embargoes on grain and technology shipments to the USSR, and demanding a significant increase in military spending, and further announced the boycott of the 1980 Summer Olympics in Moscow, which was joined by 65 other nations. He described the Soviet incursion as "the most serious threat to the peace since the Second World War".

=== Reagan and Thatcher ===
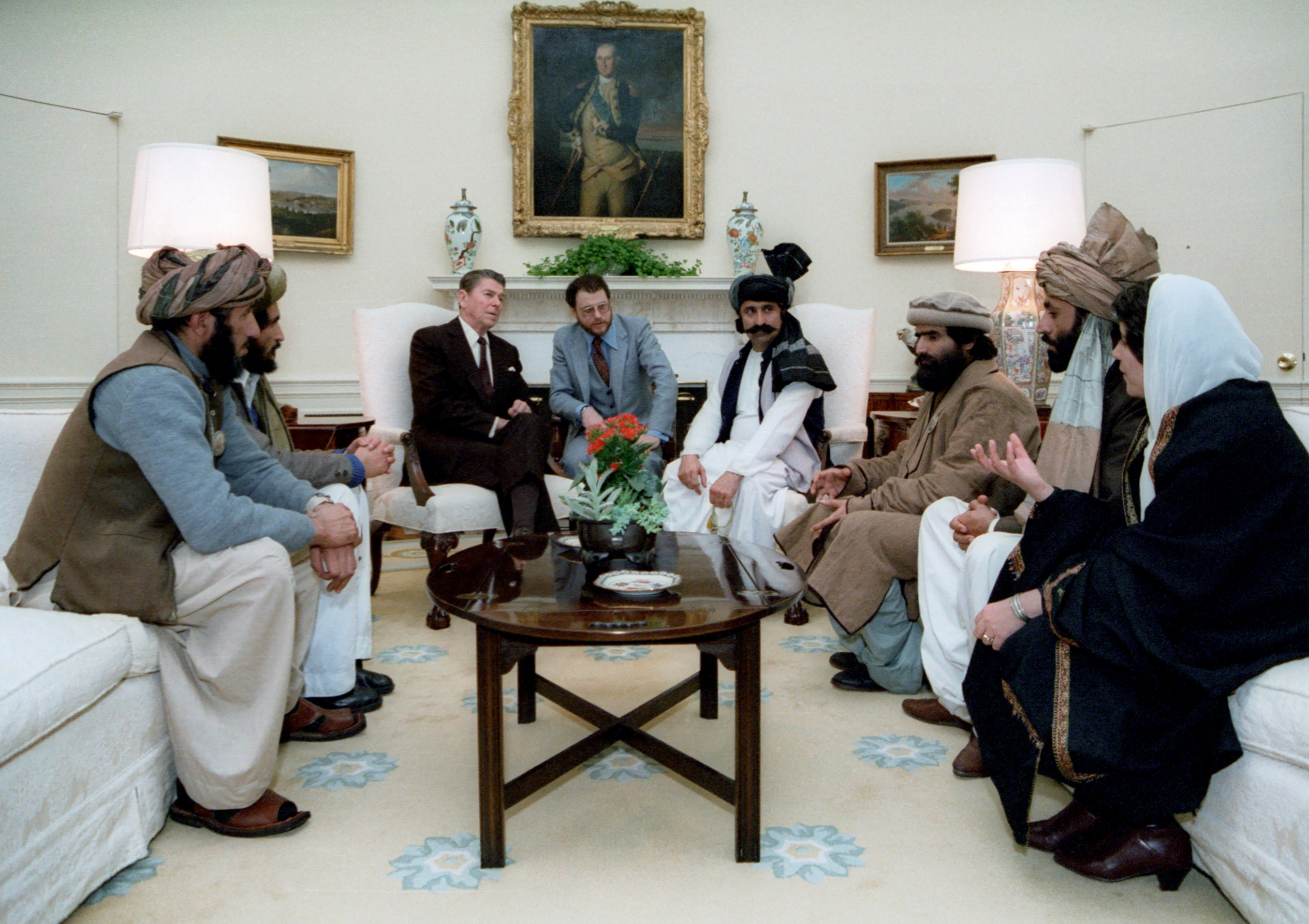
President Reagan publicizes his support by meeting with Afghan mujahideen leaders in the White House, 1983

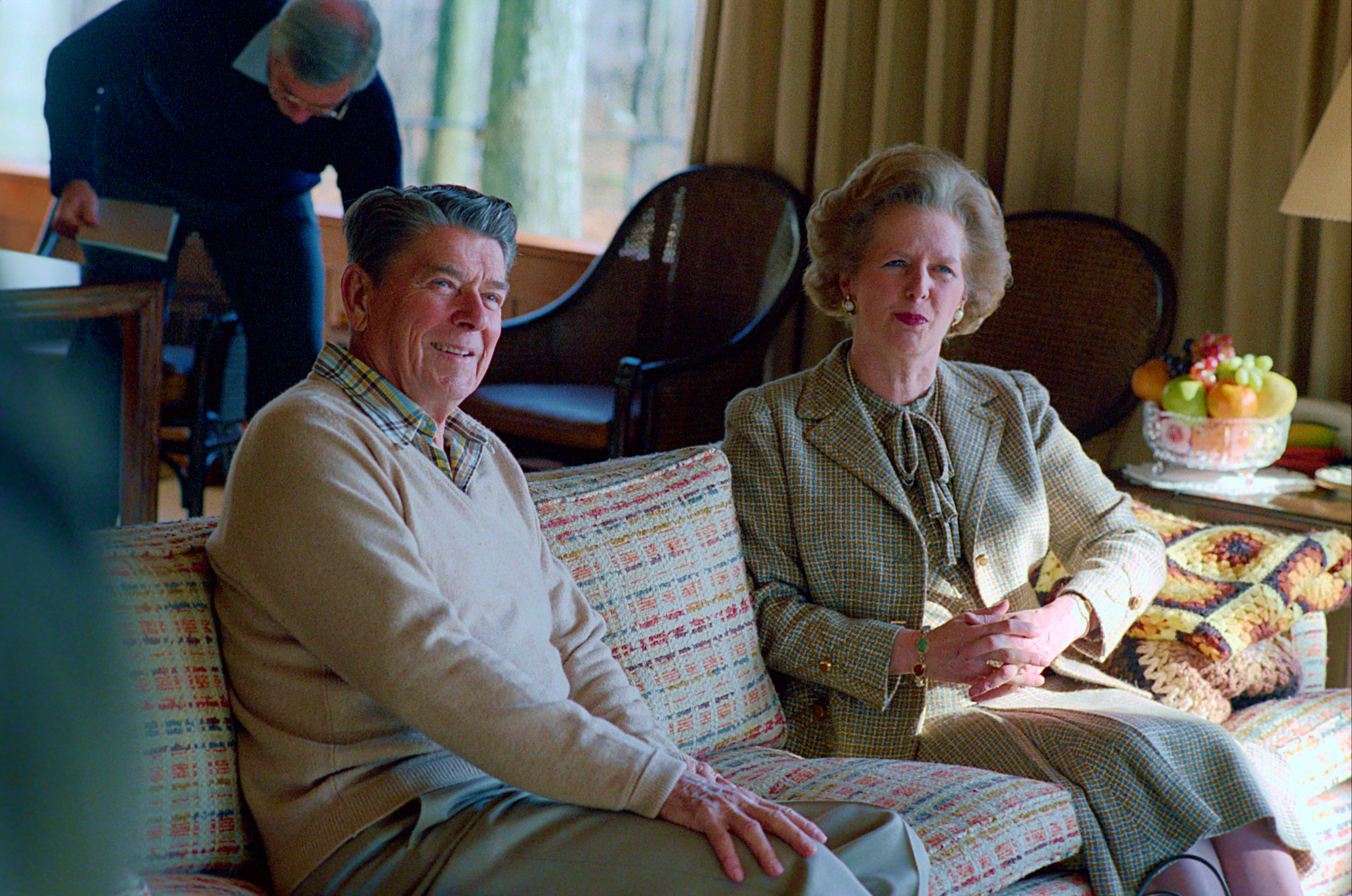
President Reagan with Prime Minister Margaret Thatcher during a working luncheon at Camp David, December 1984

The world map of military alliances in 1980

In January 1977, four years prior to becoming president, Ronald Reagan bluntly stated, in a conversation with Richard V. Allen, his basic expectation in relation to the Cold War. "My idea of American policy toward the Soviet Union is simple, and some would say simplistic," he said. "It is this: We win and they lose." In 1980, Ronald Reagan won the 1980 presidential election, vowing to increase military spending and confront the Soviets everywhere. Both Reagan and new British Prime Minister Margaret Thatcher denounced the Soviet Union and its ideology. Reagan labeled the Soviet Union an "evil empire" and predicted that communism would be left on the "ash heap of history," while Thatcher inculpated the Soviets as "bent on world dominance." In 1982, Reagan tried to cut off Moscow's access to hard currency by impeding its proposed gas line to Western Europe. It hurt the Soviet economy, but it also caused ill will among American allies in Europe who counted on that revenue. Reagan retreated on this issue.

By early 1985, Reagan's anti-communist position had developed into a stance known as the new Reagan Doctrine—which, in addition to containment, formulated an additional right to subvert existing communist governments. Besides continuing Carter's policy of supporting the Islamic opponents of the Soviet Union and the Soviet-backed PDPA government in Afghanistan, the CIA also sought to weaken the Soviet Union itself by promoting Islamism in the majority-Muslim Central Asian Soviet Union. Additionally, the CIA encouraged anti-communist Pakistan's ISI to train Muslims from around the world to participate in the jihad against the Soviet Union.

=== Polish Solidarity movement and martial law ===
Pope John Paul II provided a moral focus for anti-communism; a visit to his native Poland in 1979 stimulated a religious and nationalist resurgence centered on the Solidarity movement trade union that galvanized opposition, and may have led to his attempted assassination two years later. In December 1981, Poland's Wojciech Jaruzelski reacted to the crisis by imposing a period of martial law. Reagan imposed economic sanctions on Poland in response. Mikhail Suslov, the Kremlin's top ideologist, advised Soviet leaders not to intervene if Poland fell under the control of Solidarity, for fear it might lead to heavy economic sanctions, resulting in a catastrophe for the Soviet economy.

=== US and USSR military and economic issues ===
US and USSR/Russian nuclear weapons stockpiles, 1945–2006

The Soviet Union had built up a military that consumed as much as 25 percent of its gross national product at the expense of consumer goods and investment in civilian sectors. Soviet spending on the arms race and other Cold War commitments both caused and exacerbated deep-seated structural problems in the Soviet system, which experienced at least a decade of economic stagnation during the late Brezhnev years.

Soviet investment in the defense sector was not driven by military necessity but in large part by the interests of the nomenklatura, which was dependent on the sector for their own power and privileges. The Soviet Armed Forces became the largest in the world in terms of the numbers and types of weapons they possessed, in the number of troops in their ranks, and in the sheer size of their military–industrial base. However, the quantitative advantages held by the Soviet military often concealed areas where the Eastern Bloc dramatically lagged behind the West. For example, the Persian Gulf War demonstrated how the armor, fire control systems, and firing range of the Soviet Union's most common main battle tank, the T-72, were drastically inferior to the American M1 Abrams, yet the USSR fielded almost three times as many T-72s as the US deployed M1s.

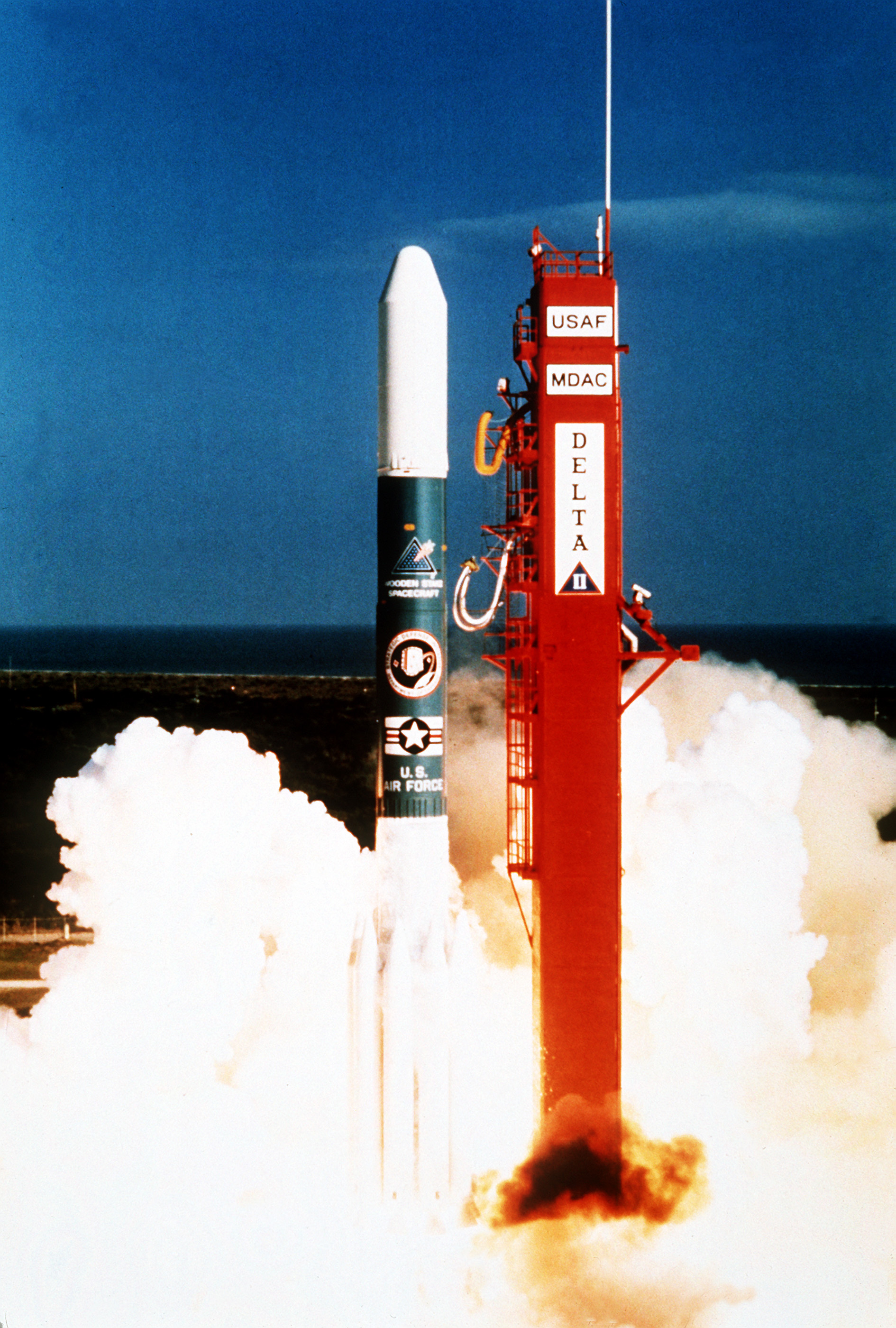
Delta 183 launch vehicle lifts off, carrying the Strategic Defense Initiative sensor experiment "Delta Star"

By the early 1980s, the USSR had built up a military arsenal and army surpassing that of the United States. Soon after the Soviet invasion of Afghanistan, President Carter began massively building up the United States military. This buildup was accelerated by the Reagan administration, which increased the military spending from 5.3 percent of GNP in 1981 to 6.5 percent in 1986, the largest peacetime defense buildup in United States history. The American-Soviet tensions present during 1983 was defined by some as the start of "Cold War II". While in retrospective this phase of the Cold War was generally defined as a "war of words", the Soviet's "peace offensive" was largely rejected by the West.

Tensions continued to intensify as Reagan revived the B-1 Lancer program, which had been canceled by the Carter administration, produced LGM-118 Peacekeeper missiles, installed US cruise missiles in Europe, and announced the experimental Strategic Defense Initiative, dubbed "Star Wars" by the media, a defense program to shoot down missiles in mid-flight. The Soviets deployed RSD-10 Pioneer ballistic missiles targeting Western Europe, and NATO decided, under the impetus of the Carter presidency, to deploy MGM-31 Pershing and cruise missiles in Europe, primarily West Germany. This deployment placed missiles just 10 minutes' striking distance from Moscow.

After Reagan's military buildup, the Soviet Union did not respond by further building its military, because the enormous military expenses, along with inefficient planned manufacturing and collectivized agriculture, were already a heavy burden for the Soviet economy. At the same time, Saudi Arabia increased oil production, even as other non-OPEC nations were increasing production. (Note: "Official Energy Statistics of the US Government", EIA – International Energy Data and Analysis. Retrieved on 4 July 2008.) These developments contributed to the 1980s oil glut, which affected the Soviet Union as oil was the main source of Soviet export revenues. Issues with command economics, oil price decreases and large military expenditures gradually brought the Soviet economy to stagnation.

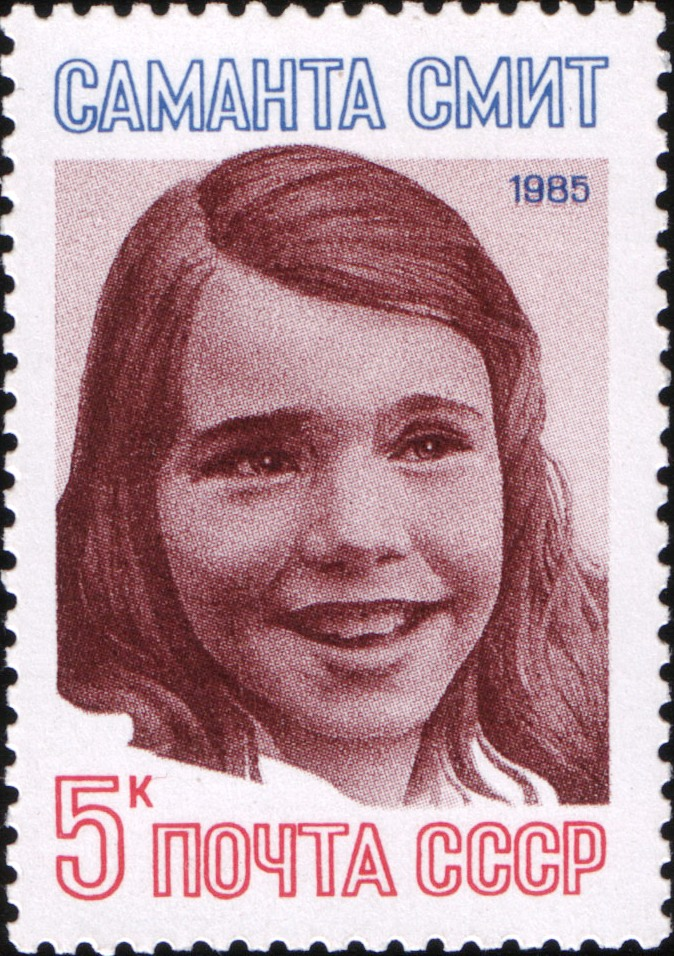
After ten-year-old American Samantha Smith wrote a letter to Yuri Andropov expressing her fear of nuclear war, Andropov invited Smith to the Soviet Union

On 1 September 1983, the Soviet Union shot down Korean Air Lines Flight 007, a Boeing 747 with 269 people aboard, including sitting Congressman Larry McDonald, an action which Reagan characterized as a massacre. The airliner was en route from Anchorage to Seoul but owing to a navigational mistake made by the crew, it flew through Russian prohibited airspace. The Soviet Air Force treated the unidentified aircraft as an intruding U.S. spy plane and destroyed it with air-to-air missiles. The incident increased support for military deployment, overseen by Reagan, which stood in place until the later accords between Reagan and Mikhail Gorbachev. During the early hours of 26 September 1983, the 1983 Soviet nuclear false alarm incident occurred; systems in Serpukhov-15 underwent a glitch that claimed several intercontinental ballistic missiles were heading towards Russia, but officer Stanislav Petrov correctly suspected it was a false alarm, ensuring the Soviets did not respond to the non-existent attack. As such, he has been credited as "the man who saved the world". The Able Archer 83 exercise in November 1983, a realistic simulation of a coordinated NATO nuclear release, was perhaps the most dangerous moment since the Cuban Missile Crisis, as the Soviet leadership feared that a nuclear attack might be imminent.

American domestic public concerns about intervening in foreign conflicts persisted from the end of the Vietnam War. The Reagan administration emphasized the use of quick, low-cost counterinsurgency tactics to intervene in foreign conflicts. In 1983, the Reagan administration intervened in the multisided Lebanese Civil War, invaded Grenada, bombed Libya and backed the Central American Contras, anti-communist paramilitaries seeking to overthrow the Soviet-aligned Sandinista government in Nicaragua. While Reagan's interventions against Grenada and Libya were popular in the United States, his backing of the Contra rebels was mired in controversy. The Reagan administration's backing of the military government of Guatemala during the Guatemalan Civil War, in particular the regime of Efraín Ríos Montt, was also controversial.

Meanwhile, the Soviets incurred high costs for their own foreign interventions. Although Brezhnev was convinced in 1979 that the Soviet war in Afghanistan would be brief, Muslim guerrillas, aided by the US, China, Britain, Saudi Arabia, and Pakistan, waged a fierce resistance against the invasion. The Kremlin sent nearly 100,000 troops to support its puppet regime in Afghanistan, leading many outside observers to dub the war "the Soviets' Vietnam". However, Moscow's quagmire in Afghanistan was far more disastrous for the Soviets than Vietnam had been for the Americans because the conflict coincided with a period of internal decay and domestic crisis in the Soviet system.

A senior US State Department official predicted such an outcome as early as 1980, positing that the invasion resulted in part from a:

...domestic crisis within the Soviet system. ... It may be that the thermodynamic law of entropy has ... caught up with the Soviet system, which now seems to expend more energy on simply maintaining its equilibrium than on improving itself. We could be seeing a period of foreign movement at a time of internal decay.

== Final years (1985–1991) ==
=== Gorbachev's reforms ===
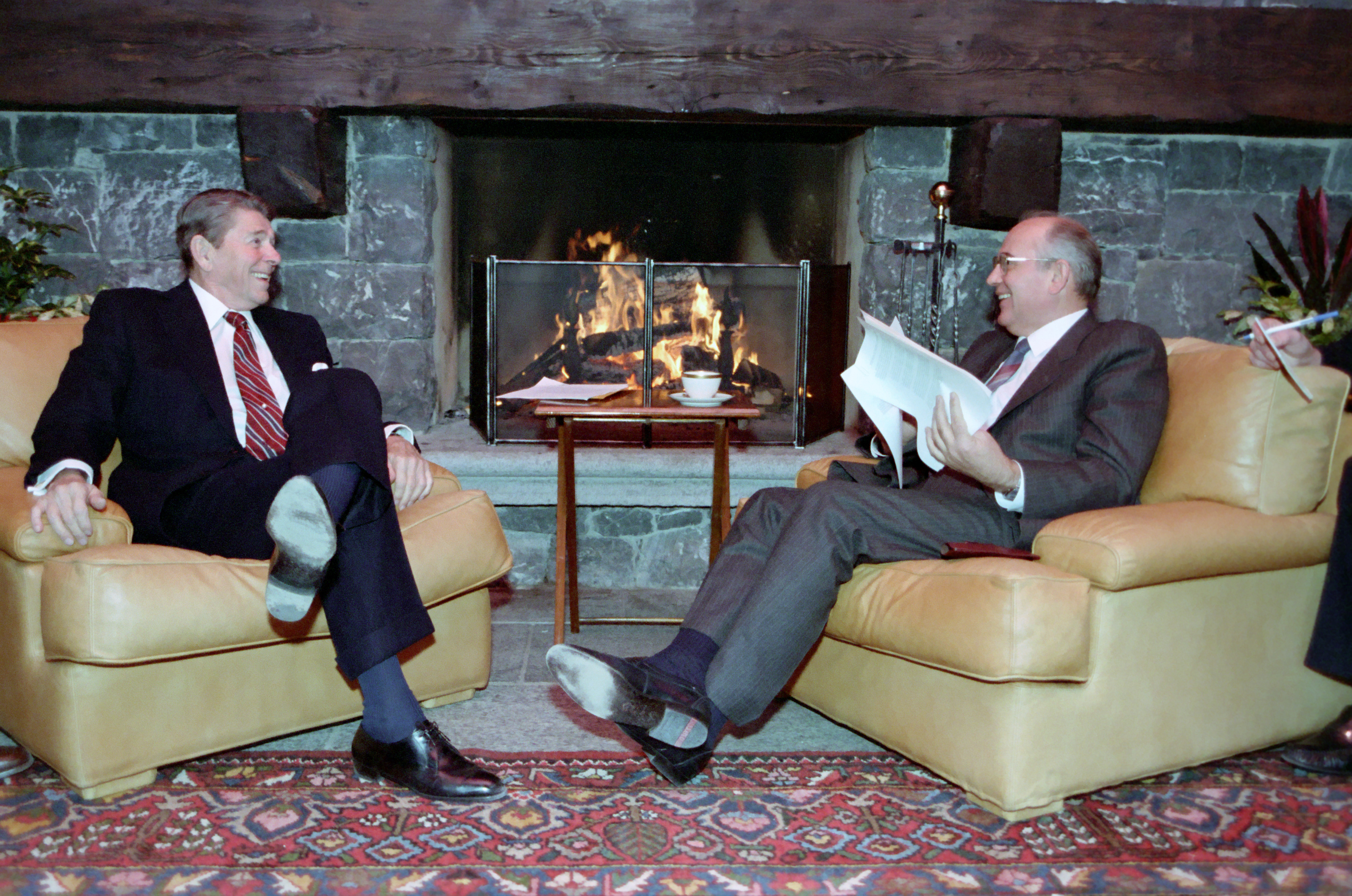
Mikhail Gorbachev in one-to-one discussions with US President Ronald Reagan

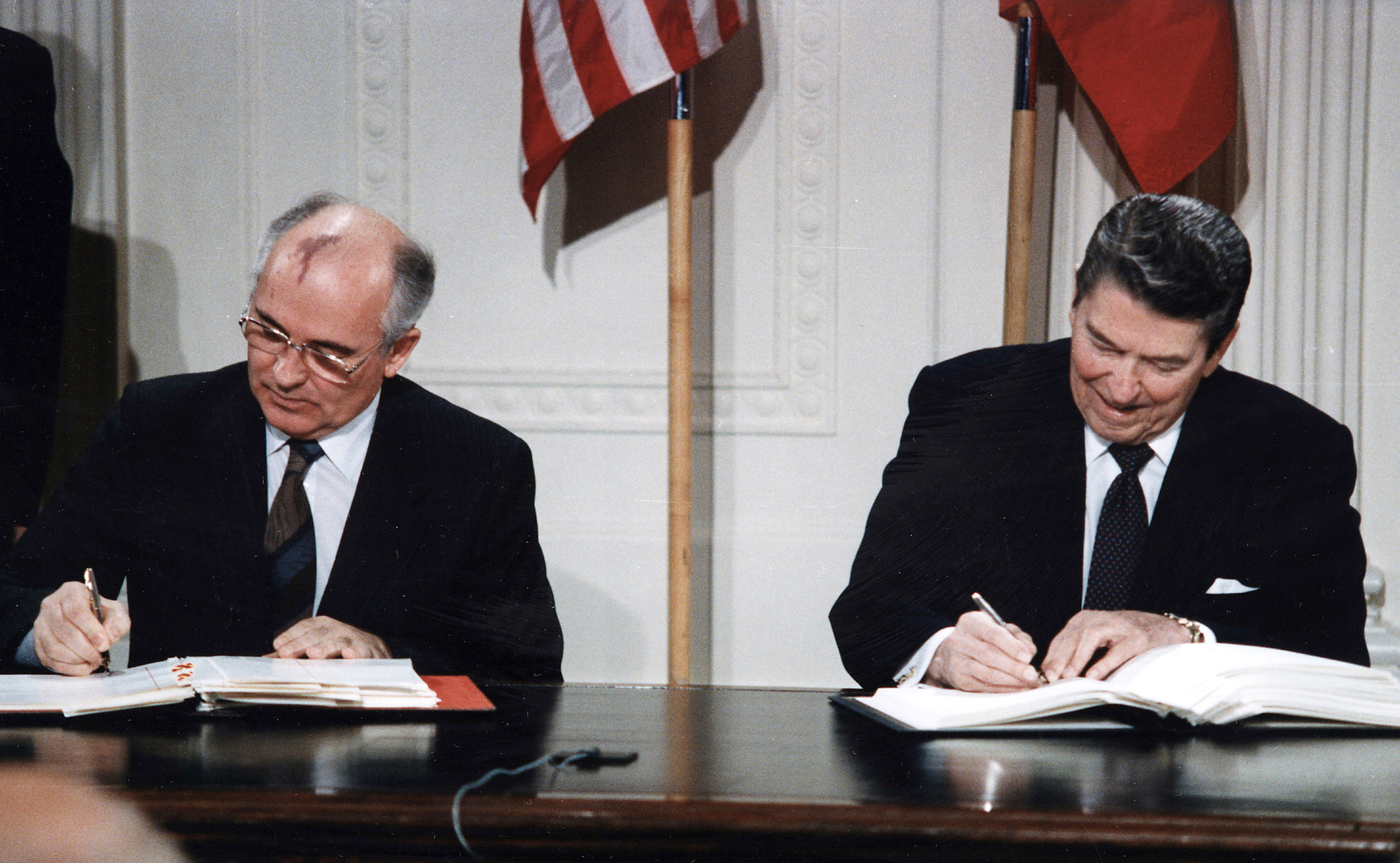
Mikhail Gorbachev and Ronald Reagan sign the INF Treaty at the White House, 1987

By the time the comparatively youthful Mikhail Gorbachev became General Secretary in 1985, the Soviet economy was stagnant and faced a sharp fall in foreign currency earnings as a result of the downward slide in oil prices in the 1980s. These issues prompted Gorbachev to investigate measures to revive the ailing state.

An ineffectual start led to the conclusion that deeper structural changes were necessary, and in June 1987 Gorbachev announced an agenda of economic reform called perestroika, or restructuring. Perestroika relaxed the production quota system, allowed cooperative ownership of small businesses and paved the way for foreign investment. These measures were intended to redirect the country's resources from costly Cold War military commitments to more productive areas in the civilian sector.

Despite initial skepticism in the West, the new Soviet leader proved to be committed to reversing the Soviet Union's deteriorating economic condition instead of continuing the arms race with the West. Partly as a way to fight off internal opposition from party cliques to his reforms, Gorbachev simultaneously introduced glasnost, or openness, which increased freedom of the press and the transparency of state institutions. Glasnost was intended to reduce the corruption at the top of the Communist Party and moderate the abuse of power in the Central Committee. Glasnost also enabled increased contact between Soviet citizens and the Western world, particularly with the United States, contributing to the accelerating détente between the two nations.

=== Thaw in relations ===
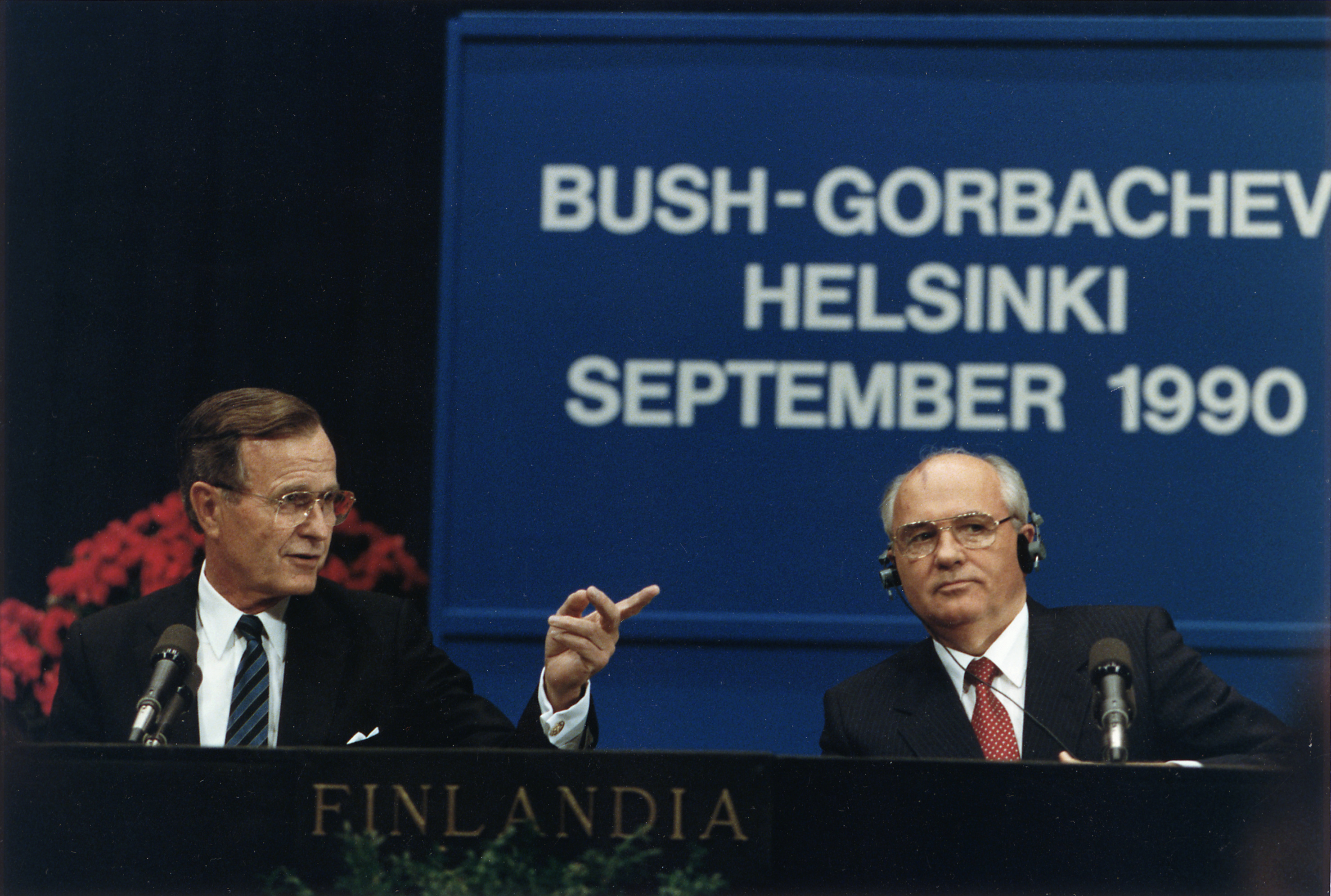
The beginning of the 1990s brought a thaw in relations between the superpowers

In response to the Kremlin's military and political concessions, Reagan agreed to renew talks on economic issues and the scaling-back of the arms race. The first summit was held in November 1985 in Geneva, Switzerland. A second summit was held in October 1986 in Reykjavík, Iceland. Talks went well until the focus shifted to Reagan's proposed Strategic Defense Initiative (SDI), which Gorbachev wanted to be eliminated. Reagan refused. The negotiations failed, but the third summit (Washington Summit (1987), 8–10 December 1987) led to a breakthrough with the signing of the Intermediate-Range Nuclear Forces Treaty (INF). The INF treaty eliminated all nuclear-armed, ground-launched ballistic and cruise missiles with ranges between 500 and 5,500 kilometers (310 and 3,420 mi) and their infrastructure.

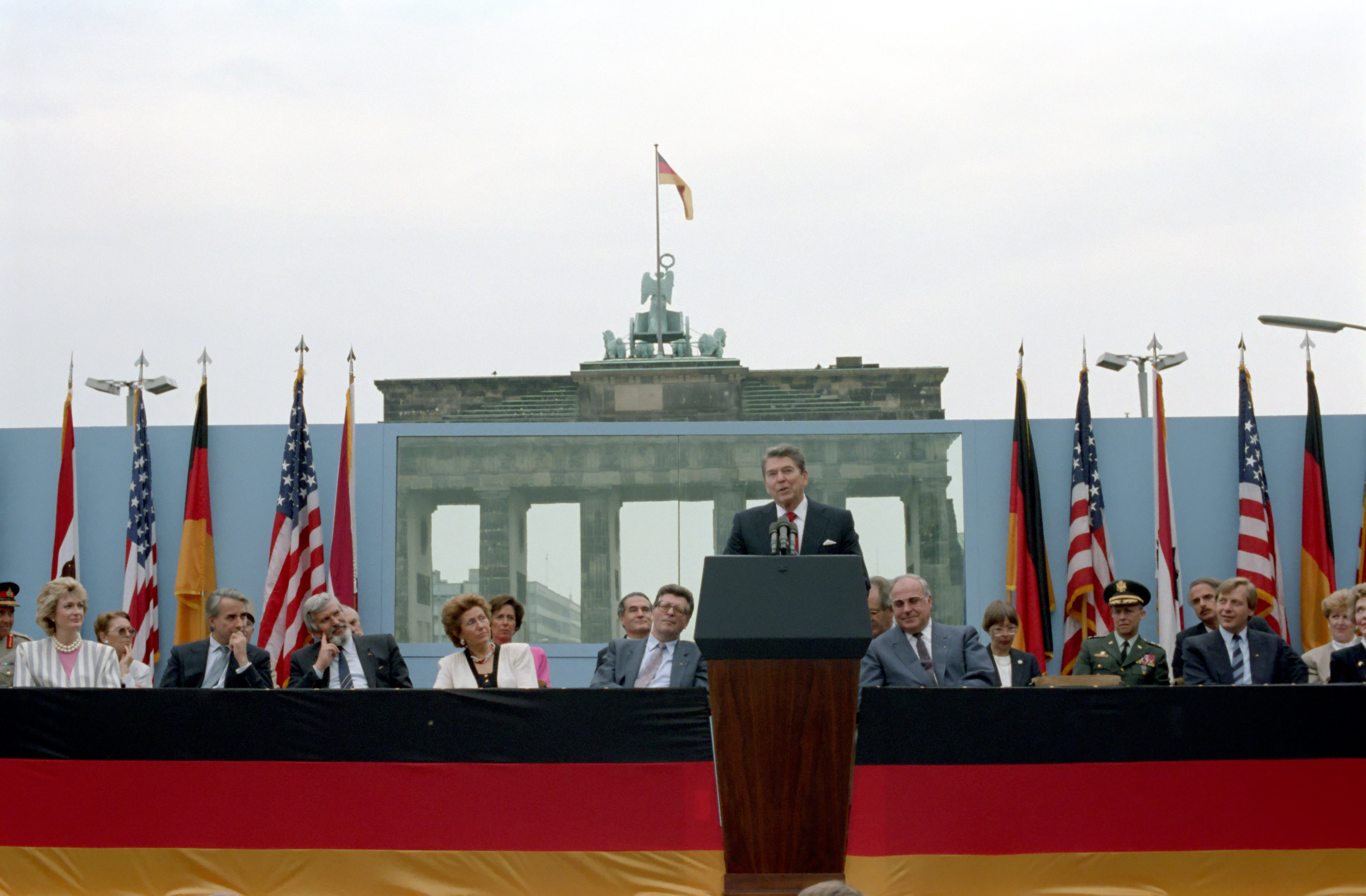
"Tear down this wall!" speech: Reagan speaking in front of the Brandenburg Gate, 12 June 1987

During 1988, it became apparent to the Soviets that oil and gas subsidies, along with the cost of maintaining massive troops levels, represented a substantial economic drain. In addition, the security advantage of a buffer zone was recognized as irrelevant and the Soviets officially declared that they would no longer intervene in the affairs of satellite states in Central and Eastern Europe. George H. W. Bush and Gorbachev met at the Moscow Summit in May 1988 and the Governors Island Summit in December 1988.

In 1989, Soviet forces withdrew from Afghanistan without achieving their objectives. Later that year, the Berlin Wall, the Inner German border and the Iron Curtain fell. On 3 December 1989, Gorbachev and Bush declared the Cold War over at the Malta Summit; for some historians such as Vladislav M. Zubok, this effectively marked the end to the Cold War, as supported by Gorbachev's surprise statement: "The Soviet Union is no longer prepared to regard the United States as an adversary."

In February 1990, Gorbachev agreed with the US-proposed Treaty on the Final Settlement with Respect to Germany and signed it on 12 September 1990, paving the way for the German reunification. When the Berlin Wall came down, Gorbachev's "Common European Home" concept began to take shape. The two former adversaries were partners in the Gulf War against Iraq (August 1990 – February 1991). During the final summit in Moscow in July 1991, Gorbachev and Bush signed the START I arms control treaty.

=== Eastern Europe breaks away ===
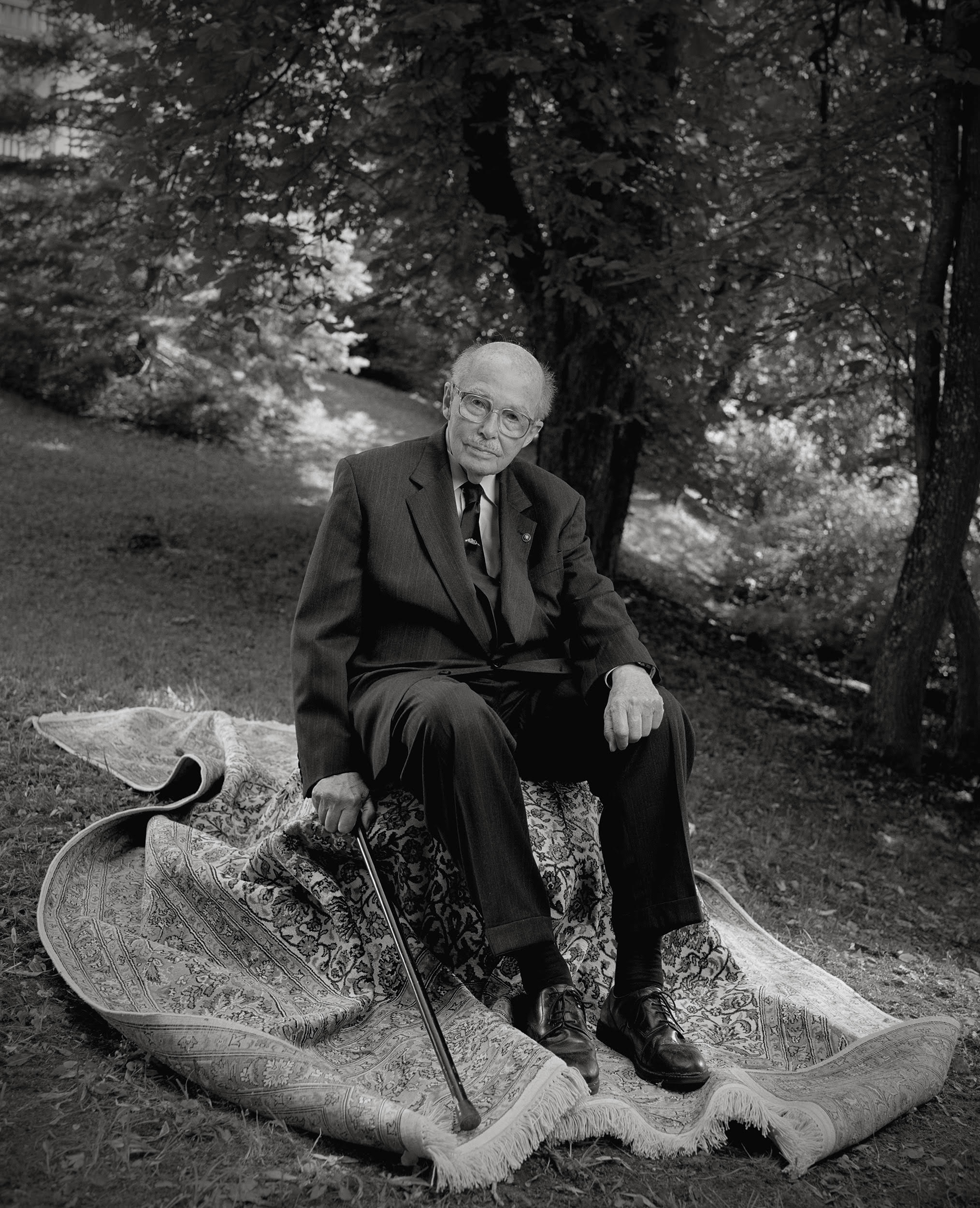
Otto von Habsburg, who played a leading role in opening the Iron Curtain

Two developments dominated the decade that followed: the increasingly apparent crumbling of the Soviet Union's economic and political structures, and the patchwork attempts at reforms to reverse that process. Kenneth S. Deffeyes argued in Beyond Oil that the Reagan administration encouraged Saudi Arabia to lower the price of oil to the point where the Soviets could not make a profit selling their oil, and resulted in the depletion of the country's hard currency reserves.

Brezhnev's next two successors, transitional figures with deep roots in his tradition, did not last long. Yuri Andropov was 68 years old and Konstantin Chernenko 72 when they assumed power; both died in less than two years. In an attempt to avoid a third short-lived leader, in 1985, the Soviets turned to the next generation and selected Mikhail Gorbachev. He made significant changes in the economy and party leadership, called perestroika. His policy of glasnost freed public access to information after decades of heavy government censorship. Gorbachev also moved to end the Cold War. In 1988, the USSR abandoned its war in Afghanistan and began to withdraw its forces. In the following year, Gorbachev refused to interfere in the internal affairs of the Soviet satellite states, which paved the way for the Revolutions of 1989. In particular, the standstill of the Soviet Union at the Pan-European Picnic in August 1989 then set a peaceful chain reaction in motion, at the end of which the Eastern Bloc collapsed. With the tearing down of the Berlin Wall and with East and West Germany pursuing re-unification, the Iron Curtain between the West and Soviet-occupied regions came down.

By 1989, the Soviet alliance system was on the brink of collapse, and, deprived of Soviet military support, the communist leaders of the Warsaw Pact states were losing power. Grassroots organizations, such as Poland's Solidarity movement, rapidly gained ground with strong popular bases.

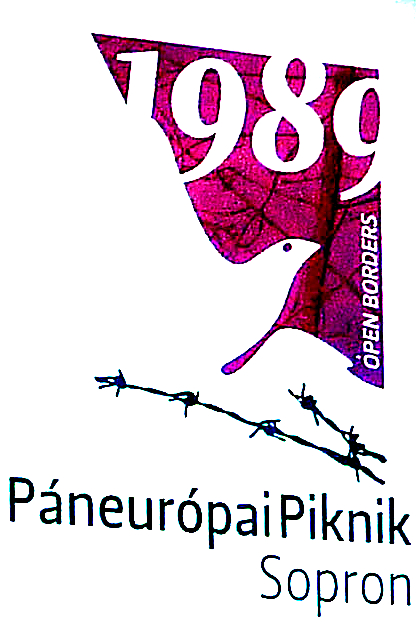
The Pan-European Picnic took place in August 1989 on the Hungarian-Austrian border

The Pan-European Picnic in August 1989 in Hungary finally started a peaceful movement that the rulers in the Eastern Bloc could not stop. It was the largest movement of refugees from East Germany since the Berlin Wall was built in 1961 and ultimately brought about the fall of the Iron Curtain. The patrons of the picnic, Otto von Habsburg and the Hungarian Minister of State Imre Pozsgay, saw the planned event as an opportunity to test Mikhail Gorbachev's reaction. The Austrian branch of the Paneuropean Union, which was then headed by Otto von Habsburg, distributed thousands of brochures inviting the GDR holidaymakers in Hungary to a picnic near the border at Sopron. But with the mass exodus at the Pan-European Picnic the subsequent hesitant behavior of the ruling Socialist Unity Party of East Germany and the non-interference of the Soviet Union broke the dams. Now tens of thousands of media-informed East Germans made their way to Hungary, which was no longer willing to keep its borders completely closed or to oblige its border troops to use armed force. On the one hand, this caused disagreement among the Eastern European states and, on the other hand, it was clear to the Eastern European population that the governments no longer had absolute power.

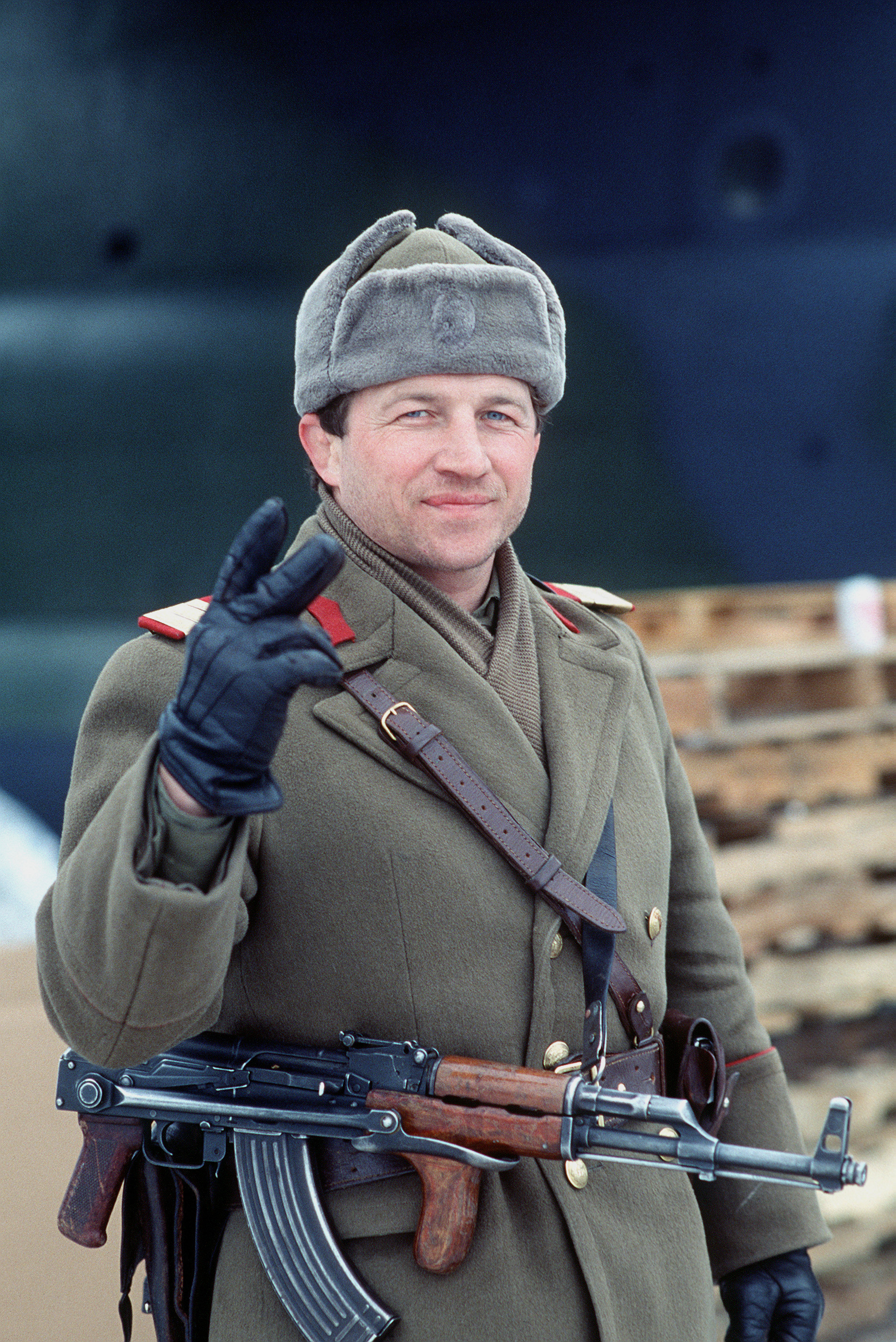
Romanian soldier giving the victory sign in the aftermath of the Romanian revolution

In 1989, the communist governments in Poland and Hungary became the first to negotiate the organization of competitive elections. In Czechoslovakia and East Germany, mass protests unseated entrenched communist leaders. The communist regimes in Bulgaria and Romania also crumbled, in the latter case as the result of a violent uprising. Attitudes had changed enough that US Secretary of State James Baker suggested that the American government would not be opposed to Soviet intervention in Romania, on behalf of the opposition, to prevent bloodshed.

The tidal wave of change culminated with the fall of the Berlin Wall in November 1989, which symbolized the collapse of European communist governments and graphically ended the Iron Curtain divide of Europe. The 1989 revolutionary wave swept across Central and Eastern Europe and peacefully overthrew all of the Soviet-style Marxist–Leninist states: East Germany, Poland, Hungary, Czechoslovakia and Bulgaria; Romania was the only Eastern-bloc country to topple its communist regime violently and execute its head of state.

=== Soviet dissolution ===
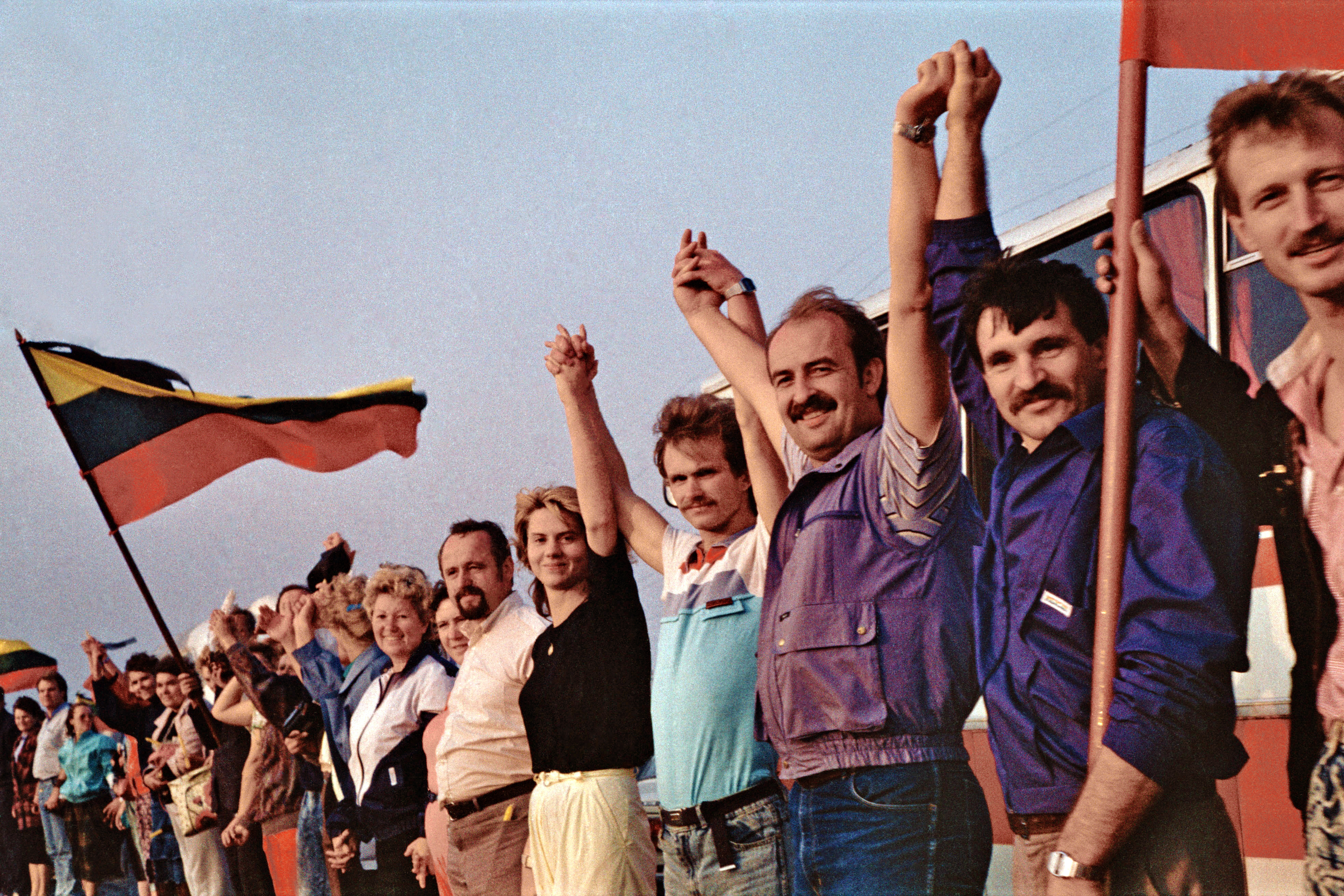
The human chain in Lithuania during the Baltic Way, 23 August 1989

At the same time, the Soviet republics started legal moves towards potentially declaring sovereignty over their territories, citing the freedom to secede in Article 72 of the USSR constitution. On 7 April 1990, a law was passed allowing a republic to secede if more than two-thirds of its residents voted for it in a referendum. Many held their first free elections in the Soviet era for their own national legislatures in 1990. Many of these legislatures proceeded to produce legislation contradicting the Union laws in what was known as the 'War of Laws'. In 1989, the Russian SFSR convened a newly elected Congress of People's Deputies. Boris Yeltsin was elected its chairman. On 12 June 1990, the Congress declared Russia's sovereignty over its territory and proceeded to pass laws that attempted to supersede some of the Soviet laws. After a landslide victory of Sąjūdis in Lithuania, that country declared its independence restored on 11 March 1990, citing the illegality of the Soviet occupation of the Baltic states. Soviet forces attempted to halt the secession by crushing popular demonstrations in Lithuania (Bloody Sunday) and Latvia (The Barricades), as a result, numerous civilians were killed or wounded. However, these actions only bolstered international support for the secessionists.

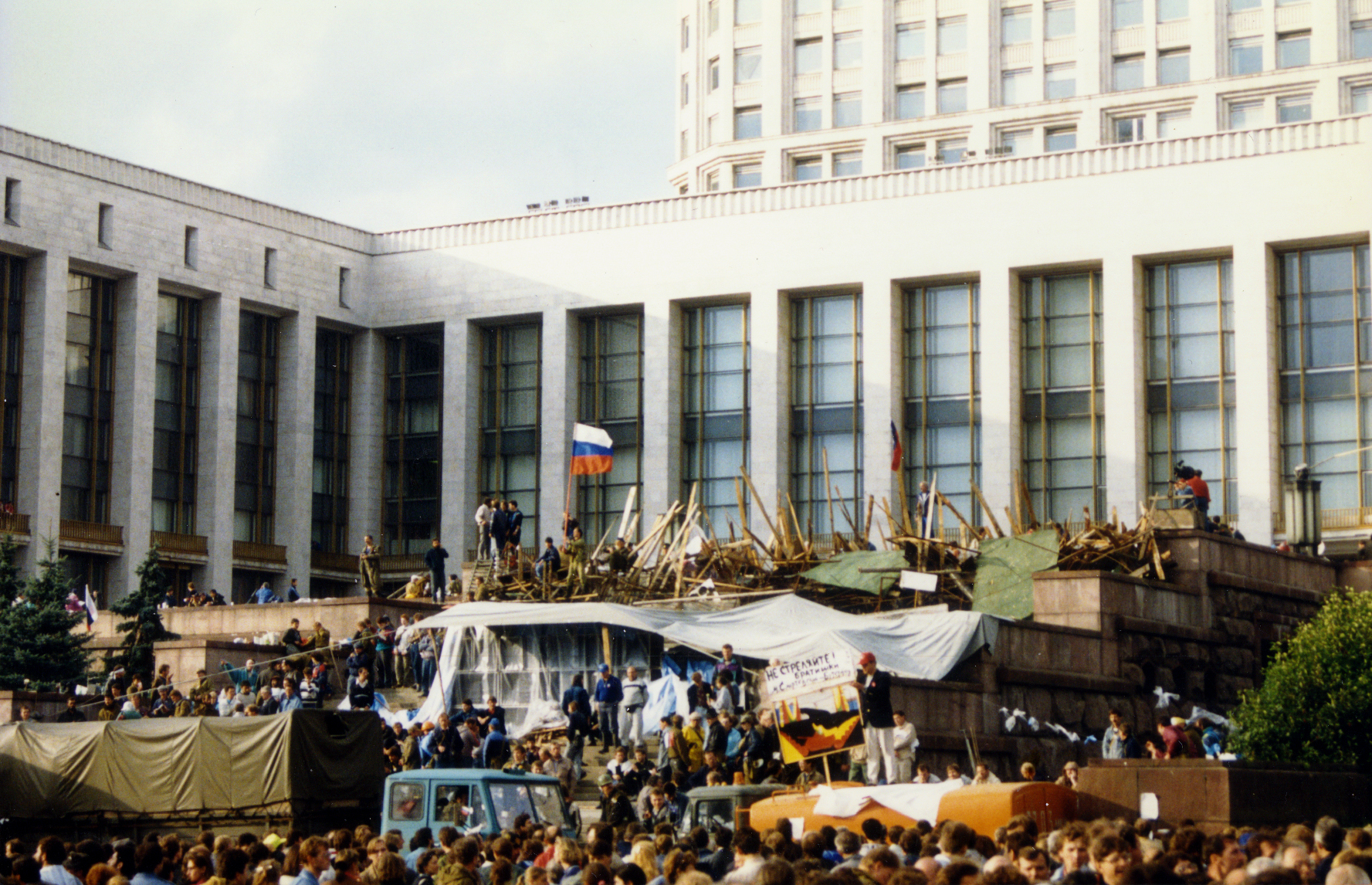
August Coup in Moscow, 1991

A referendum for the preservation of the USSR was held on 17 March 1991 in nine republics (the remainder having boycotted the vote), with the majority of the population in those republics voting for preservation of the Union in the form of a new federation. The referendum gave Gorbachev a minor boost. In the summer of 1991, the New Union Treaty, which would have turned the country into a much looser Union, was agreed upon by eight republics. The signing of the treaty, however, was interrupted by the August Coup—an attempted coup d'état by hardline members of the government and the KGB who sought to reverse Gorbachev's reforms and reassert the central government's control over the republics. After the coup collapsed, Russian president Yeltsin was seen as a hero for his decisive actions, while Gorbachev's power was effectively ended. The balance of power tipped significantly towards the republics. In August 1991, Latvia and Estonia immediately declared the restoration of their full independence (following Lithuania's 1990 example). Gorbachev resigned as general secretary in late August, and soon afterwards, the party's activities were indefinitely suspended—effectively ending its rule. By the fall, Gorbachev could no longer influence events outside Moscow, and he was being challenged even there by Yeltsin, who had been elected President of Russia in July 1991.

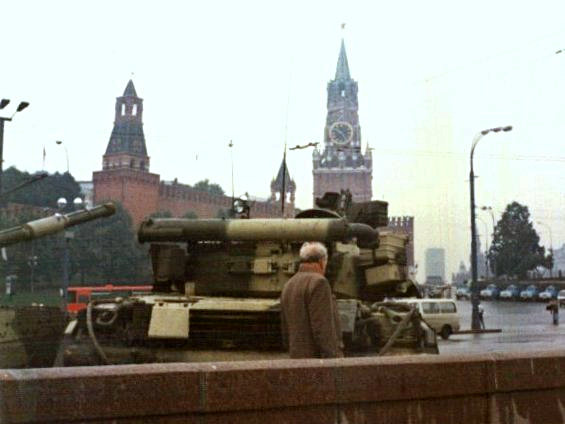
T-80 tank on Red Square during the August Coup

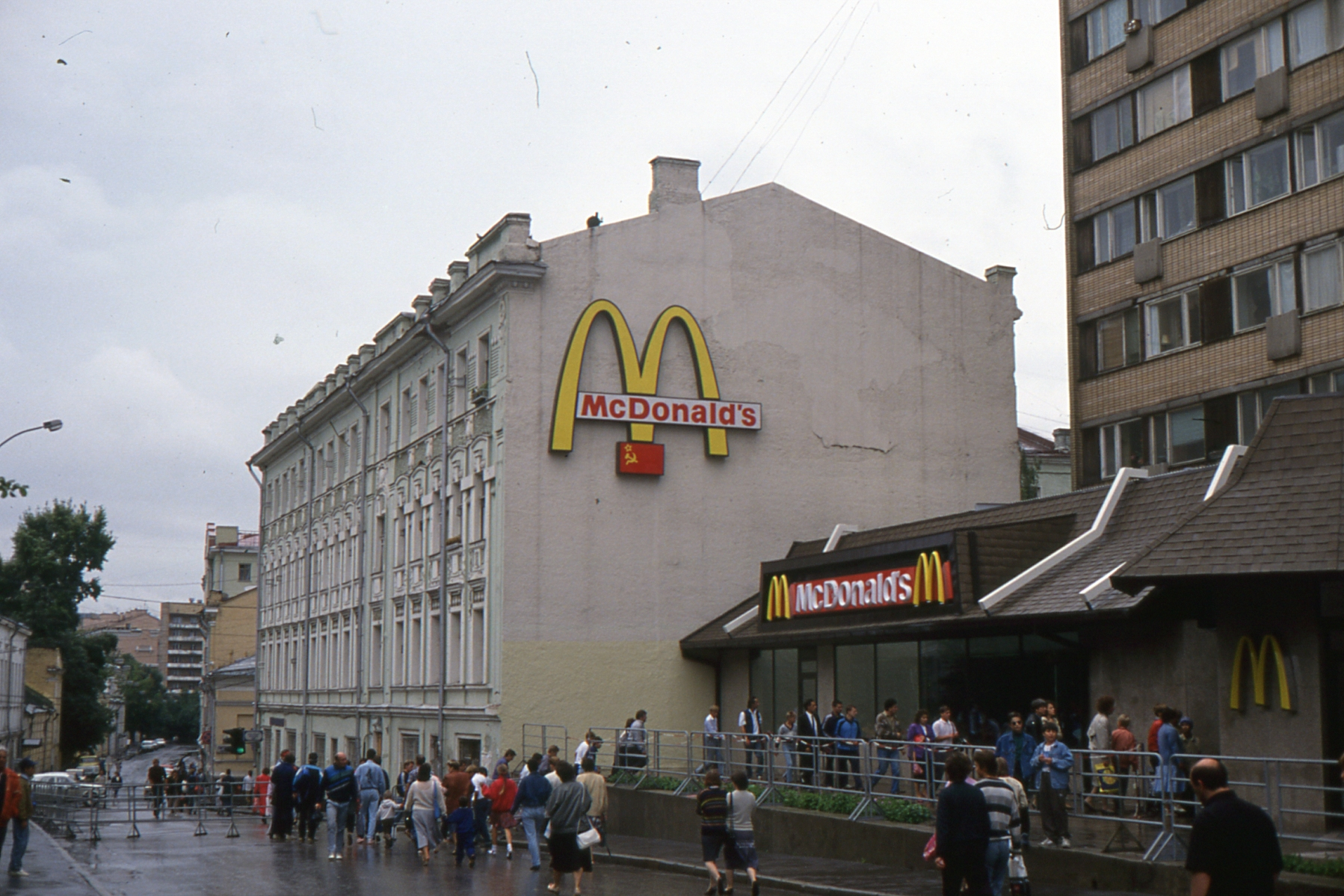
The first Russian McDonald's on Moscow's Pushkin Square, pictured in 1991

Later in August, Gorbachev resigned as general secretary of the Communist party, and Russian President Boris Yeltsin ordered the seizure of Soviet property. Gorbachev clung to power as the President of the Soviet Union until 25 December 1991, when the USSR dissolved. Fifteen states emerged from the Soviet Union, with by far the largest and most populous one (which also was the founder of the Soviet state with the October Revolution in Petrograd), the Russian Federation, taking full responsibility for all the rights and obligations of the USSR under the Charter of the United Nations, including the financial obligations. As such, Russia assumed the Soviet Union's UN membership and permanent membership on the Security Council, nuclear stockpile and the control over the armed forces.

In his 1992 State of the Union Address, US President George H. W. Bush expressed his emotions: "The biggest thing that has happened in the world in my life, in our lives, is this: By the grace of God, America won the Cold War." Bush and Yeltsin met in February 1992, declaring a new era of "friendship and partnership". In January 1993, Bush and Yeltsin agreed to START II, which provided for further nuclear arms reductions on top of the original START treaty.

== Aftermath ==
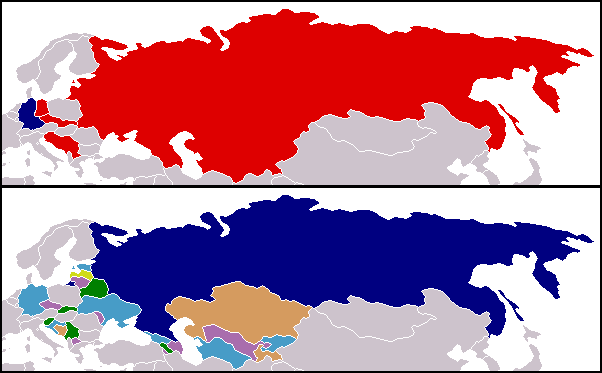
Changes in national boundaries after the end of the Cold War

In summing up the international ramifications of these events, Vladislav Zubok stated: 'The collapse of the Soviet empire was an event of epochal geopolitical, military, ideological, and economic significance.' After the dissolution of the Soviet Union, Russia drastically cut military spending, and restructuring the economy left millions unemployed. According to Western analysis, the neoliberal reforms in Russia culminated in a recession in the early 1990s more severe than the Great Depression as experienced by the United States and Germany. Western analysts suggest that in the 25 years following the end of the Cold War, only five or six of the post-communist states are on a path to joining the rich and capitalist world while most are falling behind, some to such an extent that it will take several decades to catch up to where they were before the collapse of communism.

=== Decommunization ===
Stephen Holmes of the University of Chicago argued in 1996 that decommunization, after a brief active period, quickly ended in near-universal failure. After the introduction of lustration, demand for scapegoats has become relatively low, and former communists have been elected for high governmental and other administrative positions. Holmes notes that the only real exception was former East Germany, where thousands of former Stasi informers have been fired from public positions.

Holmes suggests the following reasons for the failure of decommunization:

- After 45–70 years of communist rule, nearly every family has members associated with the state. After the initial desire "to root out the reds" came a realization that massive punishment is wrong and finding only some guilty is hardly justice.
- The urgency of the current economic problems of postcommunism makes the crimes of the communist past "old news" for many citizens.
- Decommunization is believed to be a power game of elites.
- The difficulty of dislodging the social elite makes it require a totalitarian state to disenfranchise the "enemies of the people" quickly and efficiently and a desire for normalcy overcomes the desire for punitive justice.
- Very few people have a perfectly clean slate and so are available to fill the positions that require significant expertise.

Compared with the decommunization efforts of the other former constituents of the Eastern Bloc and the Soviet Union, decommunization in Russia has been restricted to half-measures, if conducted at all. Notable anti-communist measures in the Russian Federation include the banning of the Communist Party of the Soviet Union (and the creation of the Communist Party of the Russian Federation) as well as changing the names of some Russian cities back to what they were before the 1917 October Revolution (Leningrad to Saint Petersburg, Sverdlovsk to Yekaterinburg and Gorky to Nizhny Novgorod), though others were maintained, with Ulyanovsk (former Simbirsk), Tolyatti (former Stavropol) and Kirov (former Vyatka) being examples. Even though Leningrad and Sverdlovsk were renamed, regions that were named after them are still officially called Leningrad and Sverdlovsk oblasts.

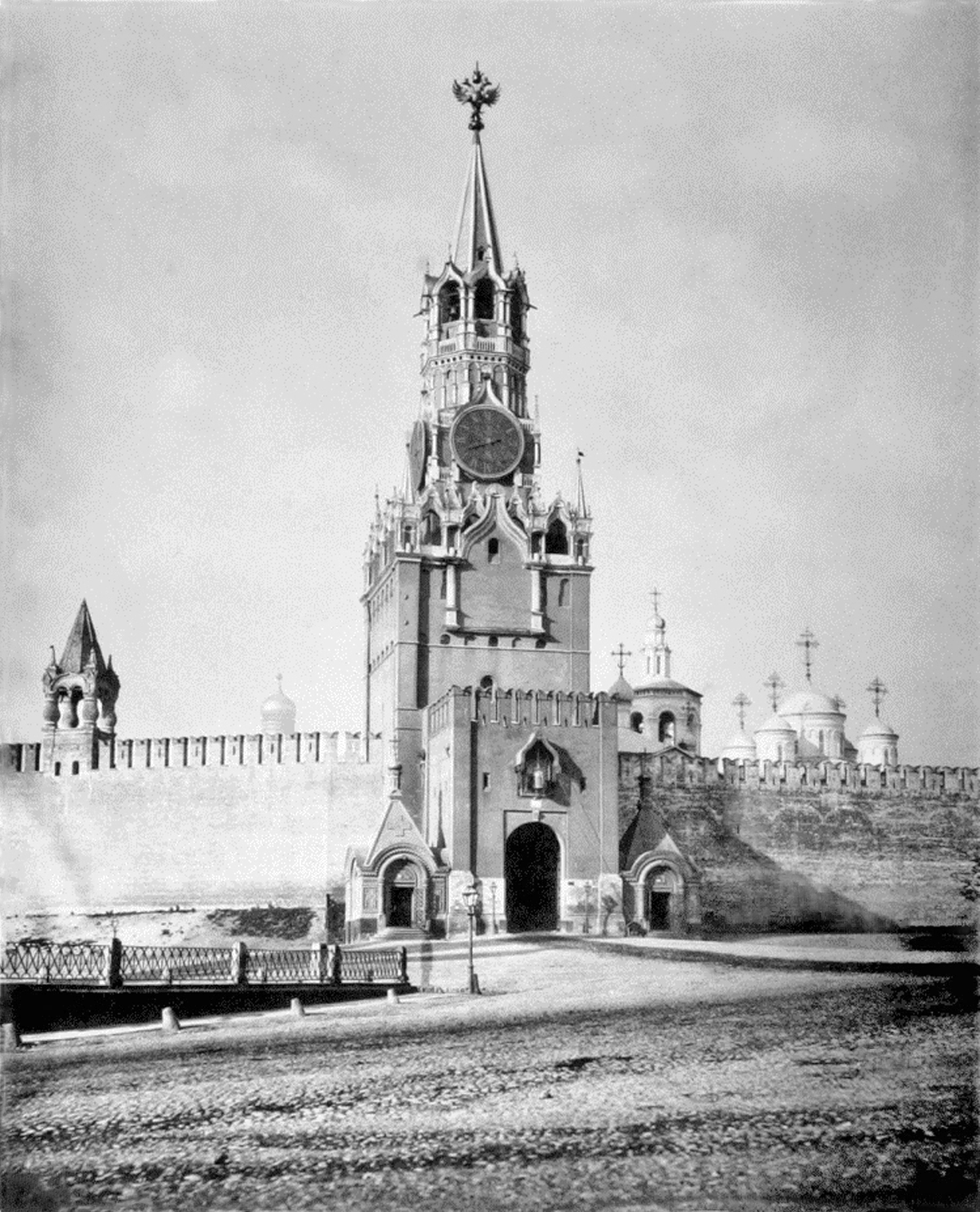
The Spasskaya Tower had kept its red star and did not restore the two-headed eagle present before communist takeover

Nostalgia for the Soviet Union is gradually on the rise in Russia. Communist symbols continue to form an important part of the rhetoric used in state-controlled media, as banning on them in other countries is seen by the Russian foreign ministry as "sacrilege" and "a perverse idea of good and evil". The process of decommunization in Ukraine, a neighbouring post-Soviet state, was met with fierce criticism by Russia. The State Anthem of the Russian Federation, adopted in 2000 (the same year Vladimir Putin began his first term as president of Russia), uses the exact same music as the State Anthem of the Soviet Union, but with new lyrics written by Sergey Mikhalkov.

Conversely, decommunization in Ukraine started during and after the dissolution of the Soviet Union in 1991. With the success of the Revolution of Dignity in 2014, the Ukrainian government approved laws that outlawed communist symbols. In July 2015, President of Ukraine Petro Poroshenko signed a set of laws that started a six-month period for the removal of communist monuments (excluding World War II monuments) and renaming of public places named after communist-related themes. At the time, this meant that 22 cities and 44 villages were set to get new names. In 2016, 51,493 streets and 987 cities and villages were renamed, and 1,320 Lenin monuments and 1,069 monuments to other communist figures removed. Violation of the law carries a penalty of a potential media ban and prison sentences of up to five years. The Ministry of the Interior stripped the Communist Party of Ukraine, the Communist Party of Ukraine (renewed), and the Communist Party of Workers and Peasants of their right to participate in elections and stated it was continuing the court actions that started in July 2014 to end the registration of communist parties in Ukraine. By 16 December 2015, these three parties had been banned in Ukraine; the Communist Party of Ukraine appealed the ban to the European Court of Human Rights.

=== Collapse of Yugoslavia and Balkan conflicts ===
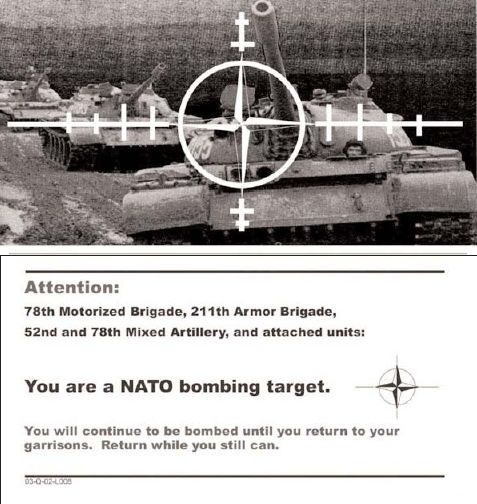
NATO psyop flyer during the Kosovo War 1999

The Cold War had provided external stabilizing pressures. Both the United States and the Soviet Union had a vested interest in Yugoslavia's stability, ensuring it remained a buffer state in the east–west divide. This resulted in financial and political support for its regime. When the Cold War ended, this external support evaporated, leaving Yugoslavia more vulnerable to internal divisions.

As Yugoslavia fragmented, the wars began after Slovenia and Croatia declared independence in 1991. Serbia, under Slobodan Milošević, opposed these moves. The Bosnian War (1992–1995) was the most brutal of the Yugoslav Wars, characterized by ethnic cleansing and genocide. International organizations, including the United Nations, struggled to manage the violence. NATO eventually intervened with airstrikes in Bosnia (1995) as part of Operation Deliberate Force and later in Kosovo (1999) as part of Operation Allied Force. These interventions marked the transition of NATO as a deterrent to the Soviet Union, to also functioning at the time as an active peacekeeping and conflict-resolution force.

== Influence ==
The post-Cold War world is considered to be unipolar, with the United States becoming the sole remaining superpower. The Cold War defined the political role of the United States after World War II—by 1989, the United States had military alliances with 50 countries, with 526,000 troops stationed abroad, with 326,000 in Europe (two-thirds of which were in West Germany) and 130,000 in Asia (mainly Japan and South Korea). The Cold War also marked the zenith of peacetime military–industrial complexes and large-scale military funding of science.

Since the end of the Cold War, the EU has expanded eastwards into the former Warsaw Pact and parts of the former Soviet Union

Cumulative US military expenditures throughout the entire Cold War amounted to an estimated $8 trillion. Nearly 100,000 Americans died in the Korean and Vietnam Wars. Although Soviet casualties are difficult to estimate, as a share of gross national product the financial cost for the Soviet Union was much higher than that incurred by the United States.

Millions died in the superpowers' proxy wars around the globe, most notably in eastern Asia. (Note: Kim 2014, p. 45: "With three of the four major Cold War fault lines—divided Germany, divided Korea, divided China, and divided Vietnam—East Asia acquired the dubious distinction of having engendered the largest number of armed conflicts resulting in higher fatalities between 1945 and 1994 than any other region or sub-region. Even in Asia, while Central and South Asia produced a regional total of 2.8 million in human fatalities, East Asia's regional total is 10.4 million including the Chinese Civil War (1 million), the Korean War (3 million), the Vietnam War (2 million), and the Pol Pot genocide in Cambodia (1 to 2 million).") Most of the proxy wars and subsidies for local conflicts ended along with the Cold War; interstate wars, ethnic wars, revolutionary wars, as well as refugee and displaced persons crises have declined sharply in the post-Cold War years.

Many of the economic and social tensions that were exploited to fuel Cold War competition in parts of the Third World remain acute to the present day. The breakdown of state control in a number of areas formerly ruled by communist governments produced new civil and ethnic conflicts, particularly in the former Yugoslavia. In Central and Eastern Europe, the end of the Cold War has ushered in an era of economic growth and an increase in the number of liberal democracies, while in other parts of the world, such as Afghanistan, independence was accompanied by state failure. It has been posited by several scholars that the dissolution of the Soviet Union and the end of communism as a global force in the post-Cold War era allowed neoliberal capitalism to become the dominant global system, which has resulted in rising economic inequality.

== In popular culture ==
The Cold War endures as a popular topic reflected in entertainment media, and continuing to the present with Cold War-themed feature films, novels, television and web series, and other media.

== Historiography ==
Interpreting the course and origins of the conflict has been a source of heated controversy among historians, political scientists, and journalists. In particular, historians have sharply disagreed as to who was responsible for the breakdown of Soviet–US relations after the Second World War; and whether the conflict between the two superpowers was inevitable or could have been avoided. Historians have also disagreed on what exactly the Cold War was, what the sources of the conflict were, and how to disentangle patterns of action and reaction between the two sides.

Although explanations of the origins of the conflict in academic discussions are complex and diverse, several general schools of thought on the subject can be identified. Historians commonly speak of three different approaches to the study of the Cold War: "orthodox" accounts, "revisionism", and "post-revisionism".

"Orthodox" accounts place responsibility for the Cold War on the Soviet Union and its expansion further into Europe. "Revisionist" writers place more responsibility for the breakdown of post-war peace on the United States, citing a range of US efforts to isolate and confront the Soviet Union well before the end of World War II. "Post-revisionists" see the events of the Cold War as more nuanced and attempt to be more balanced in determining what occurred during the Cold War. Much of the historiography on the Cold War weaves together two or even all three of these broad categories.

== See also ==
- Category:Cold War by period
- Outline of the Cold War
- American imperialism
- Atomic Age
- Canada in the Cold War
- Cold peace
- End of history
- McCarthyism
- Second Cold War
- Soviet empire
- War on terror

== Sources ==
=== Books ===
- Aarons, Mark (2007). "Justice Betrayed: Post-1945 Responses to Genocide". In David A. Blumenthal; Timothy L. H. McCormack (eds.). The Legacy of Nuremberg: Civilising Influence or Institutionalised Vengeance? (International Humanitarian Law). Martinus Nijhoff Publishers. p. 80. ISBN 978-90-04-15691-3. Archived from the original on 29 January 2017.
- Ambrose, Stephen E.; Brinkley, Douglas G. (2011). Rise to Globalism: American Foreign Policy Since 1938. Penguin Books. ISBN 978-0-14-200494-4. Archived from the original on 29 July 2020.
- Andrew, Christopher; Mitrokhin, Vasili (1999). The Sword and the Shield: The Mitrokhin Archive and the Secret History of the KGB. Basic Books. ISBN 9780465003105.
- Andrew, Christopher; Mitrokhin, Vasili (2000). The Sword and the Shield: The Mitrokhin Archive and the Secret History of the KGB. Basic Books. ISBN 9780465003129.
- Ang, Cheng Guan. Southeast Asia's Cold War: An Interpretive History (University of Hawai'i Press, 2018). online review Archived 7 July 2021 at the Wayback Machine
- Armstrong, Charles (2004). The North Korean Revolution, 1945–1950 (1st ed.). Cornell University Press.
- Bacevich, Andrew (2010). Washington rules: America's path to permanent war (1st ed.). New York: Henry Holt and Company. ISBN 978-1-4299-4326-0.
- Beisner, Robert L. (2006). Dean Acheson : a life in the Cold War. Oxford: Oxford University Press. ISBN 9780195045789.
- Benson, Robert Louis; Warner, Michael (1996). Venona Soviet Espionage and the American Response 1939–1957. National Security Agency.
- Bevins, Vincent (2020). The Jakarta Method: Washington's Anticommunist Crusade and the Mass Murder Program that Shaped Our World. PublicAffairs. ISBN 978-1541742406.
- Blight, James G. (2012). Becoming Enemies: U.S.-Iran Relations and the Iran-Iraq War, 1979–1988. Rowman & Littlefield. ISBN 978-1-4422-0830-8.
- Blight, James G.; Allyn, Bruce J.; Welch, David A. (2002). Cuba on the Brink: Castro, the Missile Crisis, and the Soviet Collapse. Rowman & Littlefield. ISBN 978-0-7425-2269-5. Archived from the original on 29 July 2020.
- Blum, William (2006). Rogue State: A Guide to the World's Only Superpower (3rd ed.). Common Courage Press. ISBN 978-1-56751-374-5.
- Blumberg, Arnold (1995). Great Leaders, Great Tyrants?: Contemporary Views of World Rulers Who Made History. Westport, Connecticut: Greenwood Press. ISBN 978-0-313-28751-0.
- Bourne, Peter G. (1986). Fidel: A Biography of Fidel Castro. New York: Dodd, Mead & Company. ISBN 978-0-396-08518-8.
- Breslauer, George W. (2002). Gorbachev and Yeltsin as Leaders. Cambridge University Press. ISBN 978-0-521-89244-5.
- Bronson, Rachel (2006). Thicker Than Oil: America's Uneasy Partnership with Saudi Arabia. Oxford University Press. ISBN 978-0-19-536705-8. Archived from the original on 29 July 2020.
- Brownell, Will; Billings, Richard N. (1987). So close to greatness: a biography of William C. Bullitt. Macmillan. ISBN 978-0-02-517410-8.
- Bulmer-Thomas, Victor (1987). The Political Economy of Central America since 1920. Cambridge: Cambridge University Press. ISBN 978-0-521-34284-1.
- Byrd, Peter (2003). "Cold War (entire chapter)". In McLean, Iain; McMillan, Alistair (eds.). The concise Oxford dictionary of politics. Oxford University Press. ISBN 978-0-19-280276-7. Archived from the original on 29 July 2020.
- Calhoun, Craig (2002). "Cold War (entire chapter)". Dictionary of the Social Sciences. Oxford University Press. ISBN 978-0-19-512371-5.
- Carliner, Geoffrey; Alesina, Alberto, eds. (1991). Politics and Economics in the Eighties. University of Chicago Press. ISBN 978-0-226-01281-0.
- Carlton, David (2000). Churchill and the Soviet Union. Manchester University Press. ISBN 978-0-7190-4107-5. Archived from the original on 13 March 2020.
- Chandler, David (2000). Brother Number One: A Political Biography of Pol Pot, Revised Edition. Chiang Mai, Thailand: Silkworm Books.
- Chretien, Todd (2017). Eyewitnesses to the Russian Revolution. Haymarket Books. ISBN 978-1-60846-880-5. Archived from the original on 29 July 2020.
- Coltman, Leycester (2003). The Real Fidel Castro. New Haven and London: Yale University Press. ISBN 978-0-300-10760-9.
- Coll, Steve (2004). Ghost Wars: The Secret History of the CIA, Afghanistan, and Bin Laden, from the Soviet Invasion to 10 September 2001. Penguin Group. ISBN 9781594200076.
- Combs, Jerald A. (2015). The History of American Foreign Policy from 1895. Routledge. ISBN 978-1-317-45641-4. Archived from the original on 29 July 2020.
- Cook, Bernard A. (2001). Europe Since 1945: An Encyclopedia. Taylor & Francis. ISBN 0-8153-4057-5.
- Cooley, John K. (2002). Unholy Wars. Pluto Press. ISBN 978-0745319179.
- Cotton, James (1989). The Korean war in history. Manchester University Press ND. ISBN 978-0-7190-2984-4.
- Cowley, Robert (1996). The Reader's Companion to Military History. Houghton Mifflin. ISBN 978-0-395-66969-3.
- Cox, Michael (1990). Beyond the Cold War: Superpowers at the Crossroads. University Press of America. ISBN 978-0-8191-7865-7. Archived from the original on 6 September 2015.
- Craig, Campbell; Logevall, Fredrik (2012). America's Cold War: The Politics of Insecurity. Harvard University Press. ISBN 978-0-674-05367-0.
- Crocker, Chester A.; Hampson, Fen Osler; Aall, Pamela R. (2007). Leashing the Dogs of War: Conflict Management in a Divided World. US Institute of Peace Press. ISBN 978-1-929223-97-8.
- Crump, Laurien (2015). The Warsaw Pact Reconsidered: International Relations in Eastern Europe, 1955–1969. Routledge.
- Cumings, Bruce (1981). The Origins of the Korean War, Liberation and the Emergence of Separate Regimes, 1945–1947. Princeton University Press.
- Cummings, Richard H. (2010). Radio Free Europe's "Crusade for freedom": Rallying Americans behind Cold War Broadcasting, 1950–1960. Jefferson, NC: McFarland & Co. ISBN 978-0-7864-4410-6.
- Dallek, Robert (2007). Nixon and Kissinger: Partners in Power. New York: HarperCollins. ISBN 978-0-06-072230-2.
- Daum, Andreas (2008). Kennedy in Berlin. New York: Cambridge University Press. ISBN 978-0-521-85824-3.
- Diggins, John P. (2007). Ronald Reagan: Fate, Freedom, And the Making of History. W.W. Norton. ISBN 978-0-393-06022-5.
- Dinan, Desmond (2017). Europe Recast: A History of European Union. Macmillan Education UK. pp. 40–. ISBN 978-1-137-43645-0. Archived from the original on 29 July 2020.
- Dobrynin, Anatoly (2001). In Confidence: Moscow's Ambassador to Six Cold War Presidents. University of Washington Press. ISBN 978-0-295-98081-2.
- Doenecke, Justus D.; Stoler, Mark A. (2005). Debating Franklin D. Roosevelt's Foreign Policies, 1933–1945. Rowman & Littlefield. ISBN 978-0-8476-9416-7. Archived from the original on 29 July 2020.
- Dominguez, Jorge I. (1989). To Make a World Safe for Revolution: Cuba's Foreign Policy. Harvard University Press. ISBN 978-0-674-89325-2.
- Dowty, Alan (1989). Closed Borders: The Contemporary Assault on Freedom of Movement. Yale University Press. ISBN 0-300-04498-4.
- Duiker, William J. (31 August 2009). Contemporary World History. Wadsworth Pub Co. ISBN 978-0-495-57271-8. Archived from the original on 22 June 2020.
- Duke, Simón (1989). United States Military Forces and Installations in Europe. Oxford University Press. ISBN 978-0-19-829132-9.
- Elleman, Bruce A. (2001). Modern Chinese Warfare, 1795–1989. Routledge. ISBN 0415214742.
- Ello, Paul, ed. (1968). "Action Plan of the Communist Party of Czechoslovakia (Prague, April 1968)". Dubcek's Blueprint for Freedom: His original documents leading to the invasion of Czechoslovakia. Control Committee of the Communist Party of Czechoslovakia. William Kimber & Co.
- English, Robert (2000). Russia and the Idea of the West: Gorbachev, Intellectuals, and the End of the Cold War. Columbia University Press. ISBN 978-0-231-50474-4. Archived from the original on 29 July 2020.
- Erlich, Reese (2008). Dateline Havana: The Real Story of U.S. Policy and the Future of Cuba. Sausalito, California: PoliPoint Press. ISBN 978-0-9815769-7-8.
- Fehrenbach, T. R. (2001). This Kind of War: The Classic Korean War History (15th Anniversary ed.). Washington, D.C.: Potomac Books. ISBN 978-1-57488-334-3.
- Franklin, Jane (2016). Cuba and the U.S. empire : a chronological history. New York: New York University Press. ISBN 978-1-58367-605-9.
- Friedman, Norman (2007). The Fifty-Year War: Conflict and Strategy in the Cold War. Naval Institute Press. ISBN 978-1-59114-287-4.
- Fritsch-Bournazel, Renata (1990). Confronting the German question: Germans on the East-West divide. Berg. ISBN 978-0-85496-100-9.
- Gaddis, John Lewis (1990). Russia, the Soviet Union and the United States. An Interpretative History. McGraw-Hill. ISBN 978-0-07-557258-9.
- Gaddis, John Lewis (2005). The Cold War: A New History. Penguin Press. ISBN 978-1-59420-062-5.
- Gaidar, E. T. (2007). Collapse of an empire: lessons for modern Russia. Washington, D.C.: Brookings Institution Press. ISBN 9780815731146.
- Garthoff, Raymond (1994). Détente and Confrontation: American-Soviet Relations from Nixon to Reagan. Brookings Institution Press. ISBN 978-0-8157-3041-5.
- Gasiorowski, Mark J.; Byrne, Malcolm (2004). Mohammad Mosaddeq and the 1953 Coup in Iran. Syracuse University Press. ISBN 978-0-8156-3018-0. Archived from the original on 29 July 2020.
- Gerard, Emmanuel (2015). Death in the Congo. Harvard University Press. ISBN 978-0-674-74536-0. Archived from the original on 29 July 2020.
- Gerolymatos, André (2017). An International Civil War: Greece, 1943–1949. Yale University Press. ISBN 978-0-300-18060-2. Archived from the original on 29 July 2020.
- Ghodsee, Kristen (2017). Red Hangover: Legacies of Twentieth-Century Communism. Duke University Press. ISBN 978-0-8223-6949-3. Archived from the original on 7 December 2019.
- Gibbs, Joseph (1999). Gorbachev's Glasnost: The Soviet Media in the First Phase of Perestroika. Texas A&M University Press. ISBN 0-89096-892-6.
- Graebner, Norman A.; Burns, Richard Dean; Siracusa, Joseph M. (2008). Reagan, Bush, Gorbachev: Revisiting the End of the Cold War. Greenwoo. ISBN 978-0-313-35241-6. Archived from the original on 29 July 2020.
- Grandin, Greg (2011). The Last Colonial Massacre: Latin America in the Cold War (updated ed.). University of Chicago Press. ISBN 978-0-226-30690-2.
- Greene, John Robert (2015). The Presidency of George Bush (2nd ed.). University Press of Kansas. ISBN 978-0-7006-2079-1.
- Grenville, J.A.S; Wasserstein, Bernard (1987). The Major International Treaties of the Twentieth Century. Routledge. ISBN 978-0-415-14125-3.
- Grenville, John Ashley Soames (2005), A History of the World from the 20th to the 21st Century, Routledge, ISBN 0-415-28954-8
- Halliday, Fred (2001). "Cold War". The Oxford Companion to the Politics of the World. Oxford University Press Inc.
- Hamann, Hilton (2007) [2003]. Days of the Generals. Cape Town: Struik Publishers. ISBN 978-1-86872-340-9.
- Hanhimäki, Jussi; Soutou, Georges-Henri; Germond, Basil (2010). The Routledge Handbook of Transatlantic Security. Routledge. ISBN 9781136936074.
- Hardesty, Von (1991) [1982]. Red phoenix : the rise of Soviet air power, 1941–1945. Washington, D.C.: Smithsonian Institution Press. ISBN 0-87474-510-1.
- Hardt, John Pearce; Kaufman, Richard F., eds. (1995). East-Central European Economies in Transition. United States Congress, Joint Economic Committee. M.E. Sharpe. ISBN 978-1-56324-613-5. Archived from the original on 29 July 2020.
- Harrison, Hope Millard (2003). Driving the Soviets Up the Wall: Soviet-East German Relations, 1953–1961. Princeton University Press. ISBN 0-691-09678-3.
- Hart-Landsberg, Martin (1998). Korea: Division, Reunification, & U.S. Foreign Policy. Monthly Review Press. ISBN 9780853459279.
- Haruki, Wada (2018). The Korean War: An International History. Rowman & Littlefield. ISBN 978-1-5381-1642-5.
- Hasanli, Jamil (2014). Khrushchev's Thaw and National Identity in Soviet Azerbaijan, 1954–1959. Lexington Books.
- Heller, Henry (2006). The Cold War and the new imperialism: a global history, 1945–2005. Monthly Review Press. ISBN 978-1-58367-140-5.
- Herring, George C. (1973). Aid to Russia, 1941–1946: strategy, diplomacy, the origins of the cold war. Columbia University Press. ISBN 978-0-231-03336-7.
- Herring, George C. (2008). From Colony to Superpower; U.S. Foreign Relations Since 1776. Oxford University Press. ISBN 978-0-19-507822-0.
- Heuveline, Patrick (2001). "The Demographic Analysis of Mortality Crises: The Case of Cambodia, 1970–1979". Forced Migration and Mortality. National Academies Press. ISBN 978-0-309-07334-9.
- Hixson, Walter L. (2009). The Myth of American Diplomacy: National Identity and U.S. Foreign Policy. Yale University Press. ISBN 978-0-300-15013-1. Archived from the original on 29 July 2020.
- Hoppe, Bert (2011). In Stalins Gefolgschaft: Moskau und die KPD 1928–1933 (in German). Oldenbourg Verlag. ISBN 9783486711738.
- Hughes, Geraint (2014). My Enemy's Enemy: Proxy Warfare in International Politics. Brighton: Sussex Academic Press. ISBN 978-1-84519-627-1.
- Hussain, Rizwan (2005). Pakistan and the emergence of Islamic militancy in Afghanistan. Aldershot, England Burlington, VT: Ashgate. ISBN 978-0-7546-4434-7.
- Hwang, Su-kyoung (2016). Korea's Grievous War. University of Pennsylvania Press. ISBN 978-0-8122-4845-6.
- Isby, David C.; Kamps, Charles Tustin (1985). Armies of NATO's Central Front. Jane's. ISBN 978-0-7106-0341-8.
- Itzigsohn, José (2000). Developing Poverty: The State, Labor Market Deregulation, and the Informal Economy in Costa Rica and the Dominican Republic. University Park, Pennsylvania: Penn State University Press. ISBN 978-0-271-02028-0. Archived from the original on 6 September 2015.
- Jennings, Christian (2017). Flashpoint Trieste: The First Battle of the Cold War. Lebanon, NH: ForeEdge. ISBN 9781512601725.
- Jowett, Garth; O'Donnell, Victoria (2005). "What Is Propaganda, and How Does It Differ From Persuasion?". Propaganda and Persuasion. Sage Publications. ISBN 978-1-4129-0898-6.
- Jonas, Manfred (1985). The United States and Germany: A Diplomatic History. Cornell University Press. ISBN 0-8014-9890-2. Archived from the original on 29 July 2020.
- Jones, Geoffrey (2014). "Firms and Global Capitalism". In Neal, Larry; Williamson, Jeffrey G. (eds.). The Cambridge History of Capitalism: Volume 2, The Spread of Capitalism: From 1848 to the Present. Cambridge University Press. pp. 176–179. ISBN 978-1-316-02571-0. Archived from the original on 29 July 2020.
- Jones, Howard (2009). Crucible of Power: A History of American Foreign Relations from 1945. Lanham: Rowman & Littlefield. ISBN 978-0-7425-6454-1.
- Jones, Seth G. (2010). In the Graveyard of Empires: America's War in Afghanistan. W. W. Norton & Company. ISBN 9780393071429.
- Kalinovsky, Artemy M. (2011). A Long Goodbye: The Soviet Withdrawal from Afghanistan. Harvard University Press. ISBN 978-0-674-05866-8.
- Kalnins, Mara (2015). Latvia: A Short History. Hurst. ISBN 978-1-84904-606-0. Archived from the original on 29 July 2020.
- Karabell, Zachary (1999). Architects of Intervention: The United States the Third World and the Cold War 1946–1962. LSU Press. ISBN 978-0-8071-2341-6.
- Kempe, Frederick (2011). Berlin 1961. Penguin Group (US). ISBN 978-0-399-15729-5.
- Khanna, V.N. (2013). International Relations (5th ed.). Vikas. ISBN 978-93-259-6836-3.
- Kiernan, Ben (2003). "Twentieth-Century Genocides Underlying Ideological Themes from Armenia to East Timor". In Robert Gellately, Ben Kiernan (ed.). The Specter of Genocide: Mass Murder in Historical Perspective. Cambridge University Press. ISBN 978-0-521-52750-7.
- Kim, Samuel S. (2014). "The Evolving Asian System". International Relations of Asia. Rowman & Littlefield. ISBN 9781442226418.
- Kinsella, Warren (1992). Unholy Alliances. Lester Publishing. ISBN 978-1-895555-24-0.
- Kinvig, Clifford (2007). Churchill's crusade : the British invasion of Russia, 1918–1920. Hambledon Continuum. ISBN 978-1-84725-021-6.
- Kinzer, Stephen (2003). All the Shah's men : an American coup and the roots of Middle East terror. Hoboken, NJ: J. Wiley & Sons. ISBN 978-0-471-67878-6.
- Kissinger, H. (2011). On China. New York: Penguin Press. ISBN 9781101445358.
- Koven, Steven G. (2015). Responsible Governance: A Case Study Approach. M.E. Sharpe. pp. 93–. ISBN 978-0-7656-2932-6. Archived from the original on 29 July 2020.
- Kramer, Mark (2014). "The Soviet Bloc and the Cold War in Europe". In Larresm, Klaus (ed.). A Companion to Europe Since 1945. Wiley. ISBN 978-1-118-89024-0.
- Kydd, Andrew H. (2018). Trust and Mistrust in International Relations. Princeton University Press. pp. 107–. ISBN 978-0-691-18851-5. Archived from the original on 29 July 2020.
- LaFeber, Walter (1993a). "Thomas C. Mann and the Devolution of Latin American Policy: From the Good Neighbor to Military Intervention". In Thomas J. McCormick & Walter LaFeber (eds.). Behind the Throne: Servants of Power to Imperial Presidents, 1898–1968. University of Wisconsin Press. ISBN 0-299-13740-6.
- LaFeber, Walter (1993). America, Russia, and the Cold War, 1945–1992. McGraw-Hill. ISBN 978-0-07-035853-9.
- LaFeber, Walter (2002). America, Russia, and the Cold War, 1945–2002. McGraw-Hill. ISBN 978-0-07-284903-5.
- Large, David K. (1996). Germans to the Front: West German Rearmament in the Adenauer Era. University of North Carolina Press.
- Layne, Christopher (2007). The Peace of Illusions: American Grand Strategy from 1940 to the Present. Cornell University Press. ISBN 978-0-8014-7411-8. Archived from the original on 29 July 2020.
- Lechuga Hevia, Carlos (2001). Cuba and the Missile Crisis. Melbourne, Australia: Ocean Press. ISBN 978-1-876175-34-4.
- Lee, Tae-Woo (2008). Military Technologies of the World. Vol. 1. Santa Barbara, CA: ABC-CLIO. ISBN 978-0-275-99535-5.
- Lefeber, R.; Fitzmaurice, M.; Vierdag, E. W. (1991). The Changing political structure of Europe: aspects of international law. M. Nijhoff. ISBN 978-0-7923-1379-3.
- Leffler, Melvyn P. (2008). For The Soul of Mankind: The United States, the Soviet Union, and the Cold War. New York: Farrar, Straus, and Giroux. ISBN 978-0-374-53142-3.
- Lendvai, Paul (2008). One Day that Shook the Communist World: The 1956 Hungarian Uprising and Its Legacy. Princeton University Press. ISBN 978-0-691-13282-2.
- Litwak, Robert (1986). Détente and the Nixon doctrine : American foreign policy and the pursuit of stability, 1969–1976. Cambridge Cambridgeshire New York: Cambridge University Press. ISBN 978-0-521-25094-8.
- Lüthi, Lorenz M. (2010). The Sino-Soviet Split: Cold War in the Communist World. Princeton UP. ISBN 978-1-4008-3762-5. Archived from the original on 9 June 2019.
- Malkasian, Carter (2001). The Korean War: Essential Histories. Osprey Publishing. ISBN 978-1-84176-282-1.
- Mälksoo, Lauri (28 June 2022). "The Baltic States Between 1940 and 1991: Illegality and/Or Prescription". Illegal Annexation and State Continuity. BRILL. pp. 70–139. doi:10.1163/9789004464896_005. ISBN 9789004464896.
- Mandelbaum, Michael, ed. (1996). Post-Communism: Four Perspectives. Council on Foreign Relations. ISBN 0-87609-186-9.
- Mars, Perry; Young, Alma H (2004). Caribbean Labor and Politics: Legacies of Cheddi Jagan and Michael Manley. Detroit: Wayne State University Press. ISBN 978-0-8143-3211-5. Archived from the original on 6 September 2015.
- Mawdsley, Evan (1 March 2007). The Russian Civil War. Pegasus Books. ISBN 978-1-933648-15-6.
- McCauley, Martin (2008). Origins of the Cold War, 1941–1949. Harlow, England; New York: Pearson Longman. ISBN 978-1-4058-7433-5.
- McCauley, Martin (2008b). Russia, America and the Cold War: 1949–1991 (Revised 2nd ed.). Harlow, UK: Pearson Education. ISBN 978-1-4058-7430-4.
- McMahon, Robert (2003). The Cold War: A Very Short Introduction. Oxford University Press. ISBN 978-0-19-280178-4.
- McSherry, J. Patrice (2011). "Chapter 5: "Industrial repression" and Operation Condor in Latin America". In Esparza, Marcia; Henry R. Huttenbach; Daniel Feierstein (eds.). State Violence and Genocide in Latin America: The Cold War Years (Critical Terrorism Studies). Routledge. ISBN 978-0-415-66457-8. Archived from the original on 19 July 2018.
- Menon, Anand (2000). France, NATO, and the limits of independence, 1981–97: the politics of ambivalence. Palgrave Macmillan. ISBN 978-0-312-22931-3.
- Meher, Jagmohan (2004). America's Afghanistan war : the success that failed. Delhi: Kalpaz. ISBN 978-81-7835-262-6.
- Miglietta, John P. (2002). American Alliance Policy in the Middle East, 1945–1992: Iran, Israel, and Saudi Arabia. Lexington Books.
- Miller, Nicola (2002). "The Real Gap in the Cuban Missile Crisis: The Post-Cold-War Historiography and Continued Omission of Cuba". In Carter, Dale; Clifton, Robin (eds.). War and Cold War in American foreign policy, 1942–62. Basingstoke: Palgrave Macmillan. ISBN 978-1-4039-1385-2.
- Miller, Robert; Wainstock, Dennis D. (2013). Indochina and Vietnam: The Thirty-five Year War, 1940–1975. Enigma Books. pp. 101–102. ISBN 978-1-936274-66-6. Archived from the original on 29 July 2020.
- Miller, Roger Gene (2000). To Save a City: The Berlin Airlift, 1948–1949. Texas A&M University Press. ISBN 978-0-89096-967-0.
- Moschonas, Gerassimos (2002). In the Name of Social Democracy: The Great Transformation, 1945 to the Present. Translated by Elliot, Gregory. Verso. pp. 4–. ISBN 978-1-85984-639-1. Archived from the original on 29 July 2020.
- Moss, George (1993). America in the Twentieth Century. Prentice Hall. ISBN 978-0-13-031733-9.
- Mosyakov, Dmitry (2004). "The Khmer Rouge and the Vietnamese Communists: A History of Their Relations as Told in the Soviet Archives" (PDF). In Cook, Susan E. (ed.). Genocide in Cambodia and Rwanda (Yale Genocide Studies Program Monograph Series No. 1). Archived (PDF) from the original on 31 December 2018.
- Motin, Dylan (2025). Territorial Expansion and Great Power Behavior During the Cold War: A Theory of Armed Emergence. Routledge. ISBN 978-1-040-38258-5.
- Motter, T.H. Vail (1952). The Persian Corridor and Aid to Russia. Center of Military History. Archived from the original on 24 December 2007.
- Moynihan, Daniel Patrick (1998). Secrecy: The American Experience. Yale University Press. pp. 15–16, 70. ISBN 978-0-300-08079-7.
- Nashel, Jonathan (1999). "Cold War (1945–91): Changing Interpretations (entire chapter)". In Whiteclay Chambers, John (ed.). The Oxford Companion to American Military History. Oxford University Press. ISBN 978-0-19-507198-6.
- Newman, William W. (1993). "History Accelerates: The Diplomacy of Co-operation and Fragmentation". In Goodby, James E.; Morel, Benoit (eds.). The Limited Partnership: Building a Russian-US Security Community. Oxford: Oxford University Press. ISBN 978-0-19-829161-9. Archived from the original on 29 July 2020.
- Njølstad, Olav (2004). The Last Decade of the Cold War. Routledge. ISBN 978-0-7146-8371-3.
- No, Kum-Sok; Osterholm, J. Roger (1996). A MiG-15 to Freedom: Memoir of the Wartime North Korean Defector who First Delivered the Secret Fighter Jet to the Americans in 1953. McFarland. ISBN 978-0-7864-0210-6.
- Nolan, Peter (1995). China's Rise, Russia's Fall. St. Martin's Press. ISBN 978-0-312-12714-5.
- Nuenlist, Christian; Locher, Anna; Martin, Garret (2010). Globalizing de Gaulle: International Perspectives on French Foreign Policies, 1958–1969. Lexington Books. ISBN 978-0-7391-4250-9. Archived from the original on 29 July 2020.
- Oberdorfer, Don (2001). Tet!: The Turning Point in the Vietnam War. JHU Press. ISBN 978-0-8018-6703-3. Archived from the original on 29 July 2020.
- Odom, William E. (2000). The Collapse of the Soviet Military. Yale University Press. ISBN 978-0-300-08271-5. Archived from the original on 29 July 2020.
- O'Neil, Patrick (1997). Post-communism and the Media in Eastern Europe. Routledge. ISBN 978-0-7146-4765-4.
- Otfinoski, Steven (2014). The Baltic Republics. Infobase Publishing. ISBN 978-1-4381-2253-3. Archived from the original on 29 July 2020.
- Palmer, Colin A. (2010). Cheddi Jagan and the Politics of Power: British Guiana's Struggle for Independence. Chapel Hill: University of North Carolina Press. ISBN 978-0-8078-3416-9. Archived from the original on 6 September 2015.
- Papathanasiou, Ioanna (5 July 2017). "The Cominform and the Greek Civil War, 1947–49". In Carabott, Philip; Sfikas, Thanasis D. (eds.). The Greek Civil War: Essays on a Conflict of Exceptionalism and Silences. Taylor & Francis. pp. 57–72. ISBN 978-1-351-88865-3. Archived from the original on 29 July 2020.
- Paterson, Thomas G. (1989). Meeting the Communist Threat: Truman to Reagan. Oxford University Press. ISBN 978-0-19-504532-1. Archived from the original on 29 July 2020.
- Paterson, Thomas; Clifford, J. Garry; Brigham; Donoghue, Michael; Hagan, Kenneth (1 January 2014). American Foreign Relations: Volume 2: Since 1895. Cengage Learning. ISBN 978-1-305-17722-2. Archived from the original on 29 July 2020.
- Pavelec, Sterling Michael (2009). The Military–Industrial Complex and American Society. ABC-CLIO. ISBN 978-1-59884-187-9.
- Pearson, Raymond (1998). The Rise and Fall of the Soviet Empire. Macmillan. ISBN 978-0-312-17407-1.
- Perlmutter, Amos (1997). Making the World Safe for Democracy: A Century of Wilsonianism and Its Totalitarian Challengers. Univ of North Carolina Press. ISBN 978-0-8078-2365-1.
- Perrett, Bryan (2016). Desert Warfare: From Its Roman Origins to the Gulf Conflict. Barnsley: Pen and Sword Books. ISBN 978-1-4738-4745-3.
- Pipes, Richard (1994). Russia Under the Bolshevik Regime. Vintage. ISBN 0-679-76184-5.
- Pipes, Richard (2001). Communism. Weidenfeld & Nicolson. ISBN 0-297-64688-5.
- Plettenberg, Ingeborg (2010). "The Soviet Union and the League of Nations". The League of Nations in retrospect – Proceedings of the Symposium / La Societe des Nations: retrospective – Actes du Colloque. Walter de Gruyter. pp. 144–181. ISBN 978-3-11-090585-4.
- Plokhy, S. M. (2010). Yalta: The Price of Peace. Penguin Publishing Group. ISBN 978-1-101-18992-4. Archived from the original on 13 December 2019.
- Power, Samantha (2013). A Problem From Hell: America and the Age of Genocide. Basic Books. ISBN 978-0-465-05089-5. Archived from the original on 29 July 2020.
- Puddington, Arch (2003). Broadcasting Freedom: The Cold War Triumph of Radio Free Europe and Radio Liberty. University Press of Kentucky. ISBN 978-0-8131-9045-7.
- Quandt, William (2005). Peace Process: American Diplomacy and the Arab–Israeli Conflict Since 1967 (3rd ed.). California: University of California Press. ISBN 978-0520246317.
- Quirk, Robert E. (1993). Fidel Castro. New York and London: W.W. Norton & Company. ISBN 978-0-393-03485-1.
- Reagan, Ronald (1991). Foner, Eric; Garraty, John Arthur (eds.). The Reader's companion to American history. Houghton Mifflin Books. ISBN 978-0-395-51372-9.
- Reinalda, Bob (11 September 2009). Routledge History of International Organizations: From 1815 to the Present Day. Routledge. ISBN 978-1-134-02405-6. Archived from the original on 1 January 2016.
- Rislakki, Jukka (1982). Erittäin salainen. Vakoilu Suomessa (in Finnish). LOVE KIRJAT. ISBN 951-835-057-4.
- Roadnight, Andrew (2002). United States Policy towards Indonesia in the Truman and Eisenhower Years. New York: Palgrave Macmillan. ISBN 978-0-333-79315-2.
- Roberts, Geoffrey (2006). Stalin's Wars: From World War to Cold War, 1939–1953. Yale University Press. ISBN 978-0-300-11204-7.
- Robinson, Geoffrey B. (2018). The Killing Season: A History of the Indonesian Massacres, 1965–66. Princeton University Press. ISBN 978-1-4008-8886-3. Archived from the original on 19 April 2019.
- Roht-Arriaza, Naomi (1995). Impunity and human rights in international law and practice. Oxford University Press. ISBN 0-19-508136-6.
- Rose, Euclid A. (2002). Dependency and Socialism in the Modern Caribbean: Superpower Intervention in Guyana, Jamaica, and Grenada, 1970–1985. Lexington Books. ISBN 978-0-7391-0448-4.
- Rothschild, Donald (1997). Managing Ethnic Conflict in Africa: Pressures and Incentives for Cooperation. Washington: The Brookings Institution. ISBN 978-0-8157-7593-5.
- Ryavec, Karl W. (2003). Russian Bureaucracy: Power and Pathology. Rowman & Littlefield. ISBN 0-8476-9503-4.
- Schmitz, David F. (1999). "Cold War (1945–91): Causes [entire chapter]". In Whiteclay Chambers, John (ed.). The Oxford Companion to American Military History. Oxford University Press. ISBN 978-0-19-507198-6.
- Schoultz, Lars (2009). "State Sponsored Terrorism". That infernal little Cuban republic: the United States and the Cuban Revolution. Chapel Hill: University of North Carolina Press. ISBN 978-0-8078-8860-5.
- Schraeder, Peter J. (1994). United States Foreign Policy Toward Africa: Incrementalism, Crisis, and Change. Cambridge: Cambridge University Press. ISBN 978-0-521-46677-6. Archived from the original on 11 May 2011.
- Schudson, Michael (2015). The Rise of the Right to Know: Politics and the Culture of Transparency, 1945–1975. Harvard University Press. ISBN 978-0-674-91580-0. Archived from the original on 29 July 2020.
- Sebestyen, Victor (2014). 1946: The Making of the Modern World. Pan Macmillan. ISBN 978-0-230-75800-1.
- Sempa, Francis (12 July 2017). Geopolitics: From the Cold War to the 21st Century. Routledge. ISBN 978-1-351-51768-3.
- Senior, Michael (2016). Victory on the Western Front: The Development of the British Army 1914-1918. Pen and Sword. ISBN 978-1-5267-0957-8. Archived from the original on 29 July 2020.
- Senn, Alfred Erich (2007). Lithuania 1940: Revolution from Above. Rodopi. ISBN 978-90-420-2225-6.
- Service, Robert (2015). The End of the Cold War: 1985–1991. Macmillan. ISBN 978-1-4472-8728-5.
- Shaw, Martin (2000). Theory of the Global State: Globality as an Unfinished Revolution. Cambridge University Press. pp. 141–. ISBN 978-0-521-59730-2. Archived from the original on 29 July 2020.
- Shaw, Tony; Youngblood, Denise Jeanne (2010). Cinematic Cold War: The American and Soviet Struggle for Hearts and Minds. University Press of Kansas. ISBN 978-0-7006-1743-2.
- Shearman, Peter (1995). Russian foreign policy since 1990. Westview Press. ISBN 978-0-8133-2633-7.
- Sihanouk, Norodom (1973). My War with the CIA. Random House.
- Simpson, Bradley (2010). Economists with Guns: Authoritarian Development and U.S.–Indonesian Relations, 1960–1968. Stanford University Press. ISBN 978-0-8047-7182-5. Archived from the original on 25 June 2018.
- Smith, Joseph (1998). The Cold War 1945–1991. Oxford: Blackwell. ISBN 978-0-631-19138-4. Archived from the original on 6 September 2015.
- Smith, Jean Edward (2007). FDR. Random House. ISBN 978-1-4000-6121-1.
- Starr, S. Frederick (2004). Xinjiang: China's Muslim Borderland. M E Sharpe Inc. ISBN 978-0-7656-1318-9.
- Stockwell, John (1979) [1978]. In search of enemies. London: Futura Publications Limited. ISBN 978-0-393-00926-2.
- Stone, Norman (2010). The Atlantic and Its Enemies: A History of the Cold War. Basic Books Press. ISBN 978-0-465-02043-0.
- Stueck, William (25 April 2013). Rethinking the Korean War: A New Diplomatic and Strategic History. Princeton University Press. ISBN 978-1-4008-4761-7. Archived from the original on 29 July 2020.
- Suh, Jae-Jung (2013). Truth and Reconciliation in South Korea: Between the Present and Future of the Korean Wars. Routledge. ISBN 978-1-135-73820-4.
- Talbott, Strobe (2009). The Great Experiment: The Story of Ancient Empires, Modern States, and the Quest for a Global Nation.
- Taubman, William (2004). Khrushchev: The Man and His Era. W.W. Norton & Company. ISBN 978-0-393-32484-6.
- Todd, Allan (2016). History for the IB Diploma Paper 3 The Soviet Union and Post-Soviet Russia (1924–2000). Cambridge University Press. ISBN 978-1-316-50369-0. Archived from the original on 2 April 2020.
- Tompson, William (1997). Khrushchev: a Political Life. Palgrave Macmillan. ISBN 978-0-312-16360-0.
- Toohey, Kristine (8 November 2007). The Olympic Games: A Social Science Perspective. CABI. ISBN 978-1-84593-355-5. Archived from the original on 29 December 2021.
- Towle, Philip (2000). "Cold War". In Charles Townshend (ed.). The Oxford History of Modern War. New York: Oxford University Press. p. 160. ISBN 978-0-19-285373-8.
- Tripp, Charles R.H. (2002). A History of Iraq. Cambridge University Press. pp. xii, 211–214. ISBN 978-0-521-87823-4.
- Tucker, Spencer C (2010). The Encyclopedia of Middle East Wars: The United States in the Persian Gulf, Afghanistan, and Iraq Conflicts, Volume 1. Santa Barbara, California: ABC-CLIO. ISBN 978-1-8510-9947-4.
- Tucker, Spencer C. (2011). The Encyclopedia of the Vietnam War: A Political, Social, and Military History. ABC-CLIO. ISBN 978-1-85109-960-3. Archived from the original on 18 May 2020.
- Tucker, Spencer C. (2016). World War II: The Definitive Encyclopedia and Document Collection. Santa Barbara, CA: ABC-CLIO. ISBN 978-1-85109-969-6.
- Turner, Henry Ashby (1987). The Two Germanies Since 1945: East and West. Yale University Press. ISBN 0-300-03865-8.
- Turner, Robert F. (1975). Vietnamese Communism: Its Origins and Development. Stanford: Hoover Institution Publications. ISBN 978-0-8179-1431-8.
- Vanneman, Peter (1990). Soviet Strategy in Southern Africa: Gorbachev's Pragmatic Approach. Stanford: Hoover Institution Press. ISBN 978-0-8179-8902-6.
- van Dijk, Ruud (2008). Encyclopedia of the Cold War. Vol. 1. Routledge. ISBN 978-0-415-97515-5.
- van Dijk, Ruud (2013). Encyclopedia of the Cold War. Routledge. pp. 860–861. ISBN 978-1135923112.
- Warren, Aiden; Siracusa, Joseph M. (2021). "Kennedy's Nuclear Dilemma". US Presidents and Cold War Nuclear Diplomacy. Cham, Switzerland: Springer Nature / Palgrave Macmillan. pp. 95–124. doi:10.1007/978-3-030-61954-1. ISBN 978-3-030-61954-1. S2CID 234294333.
- Watson, Cynthia A. (2002). U.S. National Security: A Reference Handbook. Santa Barbara, California: ABL-CLIO. ISBN 978-1-57607-598-2. Archived from the original on 6 September 2015.
- Weigert, Stephen (2011). Angola: A Modern Military History. Basingstoke: Palgrave-Macmillan. ISBN 978-0-230-11777-8.
- Westad, Odd Arne (2012). Restless Empire: China and the World Since 1750. Basic Books. ISBN 978-0-465-02936-5.
- Wettig, Gerhard (2008). Stalin and the Cold War in Europe. Rowman & Littlefield. ISBN 978-0-7425-5542-6.
- Wood, Alan (2005). Stalin and Stalinism. Psychology Press. ISBN 978-0-415-30731-4. Archived from the original on 29 July 2020.
- Wood, James (1992). History of International Broadcasting. IET. ISBN 978-0-86341-302-5. Archived from the original on 29 July 2020.
- Wyszyński, Andrzej (1949). Teoria dowodów sądowych w prawie radzieckim (PDF). Biblioteka Zrzeszenia Prawników Demokratów. Archived from the original (PDF) on 29 July 2018.
- Yergin, Daniel (5 April 2011). The Prize: The Epic Quest for Oil, Money & Power. Simon and Schuster. ISBN 978-1-4391-3483-2.
- Zubok, Vladislav M. (2021). "Revolutions". Collapse: The Fall of the Soviet Union. Yale University Press. ISBN 978-0-300-26244-5.
- Zubok, Vladislav M. (1994). "Unwrapping the Enigma: What was Behind the Soviet Challenge in the 1960s?". In Kunz, Diane B. (ed.). The Diplomacy of the Crucial Decade: American Foreign Relations During the 1960s. Columbia University Press. ISBN 978-0-231-08177-1. Archived from the original on 6 September 2015.
- Zubok, Vladislav M. (2009). A Failed Empire: The Soviet Union in the Cold War from Stalin to Gorbachev. Univ of North Carolina Press. ISBN 978-0-8078-9905-2. Archived from the original on 9 March 2017.
- Zubok, Vladislav; Pleshakov, Constantine (1996). Inside the Kremlin's Cold War: From Stalin to Khrushchev. Harvard University Press. ISBN 978-0-674-45531-3.

=== Reports ===
- Marshall, Monty G.; Gurr, Ted (2006). Peace and Conflict 2005 (PDF) (Report). Center for Systemic Peace. Archived from the original (PDF) on 24 June 2008.
- Pomeranz, William E. (4 February 2010). The Legacy and Consequences of Jackson-Vanik: Reassessing Human Rights in 21st Century Russia (Report). Woodrow Wilson International Center for Scholars. Archived from the original on 29 March 2023.
- Prados, John; Jimenez-Bacardi, Arturo, eds. (3 October 2019). Kennedy and Cuba: Operation Mongoose. National Security Archive (Report). Washington, D.C.: The George Washington University. Archived from the original on 2 November 2019.
- Smith, Walter B. (20 March 1953). "First Progress Report on Paragraph 5-1 of NSC 136/1, 'U.S. Policy Regarding the Current Situation in Iran'" (PDF) (Memo). Archived (PDF) from the original on 16 January 2015 – via George Washington University.
  - Measures which the United States Government Might Take in Support of a Successor Government to Mosaddegh (PDF) (Report). 11 March 1953. Archived (PDF) from the original on 17 June 2014 – via George Washington University.
- van Dijk, Ruud (May 1996). The 1952 Stalin Note Debate: Myth Or Missed Opportunity for German Unification? (Report). Cold War International History Project: Working Paper No. 14. Woodrow Wilson International Center for Scholars. Archived from the original on 27 December 2024.
- Weathersby, Kathryn (November 1993). Soviet Aims in Korea and the Origins of the Korean War, 1945–50: New Evidence From the Russian Archives (Report). Cold War International History Project: Working Paper No. 8. Woodrow Wilson International Center for Scholars. Archived from the original on 25 May 2017.

=== Journal articles ===
- Aftergood, S. (2017). "Cybersecurity: The Cold Waronline". Nature. 547 (7661): 30–31. Bibcode:2017Natur.547...30A. doi:10.1038/547030a.
- Allen, Robert C. (November 2001). "The rise and decline of the Soviet economy". Canadian Journal of Economics. 34 (4): 859–881. doi:10.1111/0008-4085.00103. ISSN 0008-4085.
- Bailes, Kendall E. (1981). "The American Connection: Ideology and the Transfer of American Technology to the Soviet Union, 1917–1941". Comparative Studies in Society and History. 23 (3): 421–448. doi:10.1017/S0010417500013438.
- Bungert, Heike (July 1994). "A New Perspective on French-American Relations during the Occupation of Germany, 1945? 1948: Behind-the-Scenes Diplomatic Bargaining and the Zonal Merger". Diplomatic History. 18 (3): 333–352. doi:10.1111/j.1467-7709.1994.tb00217.x.
- Crespino, Joseph (March 2020). "A Nation Ruled by Its Fears". Reviews in American History. 48 (1): 119–123. doi:10.1353/rah.2020.0016.
- Cseresnyés, Ferenc (Summer 1999). "The '56 Exodus to Austria". The Hungarian Quarterly. XL (154): 86–101. Archived from the original on 27 November 2004.
- Dalrymple, Dana G. (1964). "The American tractor comes to Soviet agriculture: The transfer of a technology". Technology and Culture. 5 (2): 191–214. doi:10.2307/3101161. JSTOR 3101161.
- Eaton, Joseph (November 2016). "Reconsidering the 1980 Moscow Olympic Boycott: American Sports Diplomacy in East Asian Perspective". Diplomatic History. 40 (5): 845–864. doi:10.1093/dh/dhw026. JSTOR 26376807.
- Edmondson, Charles M. (1981). "An Inquiry into the Termination of Soviet Famine Relief Programmes and the Renewal of Grain Export, 1922–23". Soviet Studies. 33 (3): 370–385. doi:10.1080/09668138108411366. JSTOR 151078. PMID 11633260.
- Ekholm, Kai (2001). "Political Censorship in Finnish Libraries in 1944–1946". Libraries & Culture. 36 (1): 51–57. doi:10.1353/lac.2001.0008. S2CID 152952804.
- Esno, Tyler (April 2018). "Reagan's Economic War on the Soviet Union". Diplomatic History. 42 (2): 281–304. doi:10.1093/dh/dhx061. ISSN 0145-2096.
- Farid, Hilmar (2005). "Indonesia's original sin: mass killings and capitalist expansion, 1965–66". Inter-Asia Cultural Studies. 6 (1): 3–16. doi:10.1080/1462394042000326879. S2CID 145130614.
- Garthoff, Raymond L. (2004). "Foreign intelligence and the historiography of the Cold War". Journal of Cold War Studies. 6 (2): 21–56. doi:10.1162/152039704773254759. S2CID 57563600.
- Glennon, Michael J. (May–June 2003). "Why the Security Council Failed". Foreign Affairs. 82 (3): 16–35. doi:10.2307/20033576. JSTOR 20033576. Archived from the original on 28 July 2020.
- Haro, Lea (2011). "Entering a Theoretical Void: The Theory of Social Fascism and Stalinism in the German Communist Party". Critique: Journal of Socialist Theory. 39 (4): 563–582. doi:10.1080/03017605.2011.621248. ISSN 0301-7605. S2CID 146848013.
- Hershberg, James G. (1992). "Explosion in the Offing: German Rearmament and American Diplomacy, 1953–1955". Diplomatic History. 16 (4): 511–550. doi:10.1111/j.1467-7709.1992.tb00630.x.
- Hopkins, Michael F. (2007). "Continuing debate and new approaches in Cold War history". Historical Journal. 50 (4): 913–934. doi:10.1017/S0018246X07006437.
- Iatrides, John O. (1 October 1996). "The British Labour Government and the Greek Civil War: The Imperialism of 'Non-Intervention' (review)". Journal of Modern Greek Studies. 14 (2): 373–376. doi:10.1353/mgs.1996.0020. ISSN 1086-3265. S2CID 142792238.
- Little, Douglas (1983). "Anti-Bolshevism and American Foreign Policy, 1919–1939". American Quarterly. 35 (4): 376–390. doi:10.2307/2712876. JSTOR 2712876.
- Locard, Henri (1 March 2005). "State Violence in Democratic Kampuchea (1975–1979) and Retribution (1979–2004)". European Review of History: Revue européenne d'histoire. 12 (1): 121–143. doi:10.1080/13507480500047811. ISSN 1350-7486. S2CID 144712717.
- Matray, James I (September 1979). "Truman's Plan for Victory: National Self-Determination and the Thirty-Eighth Parallel Decision in Korea". Journal of American History. 66 (2). JStor: 314–333. doi:10.2307/1900879. JSTOR 1900879.
- Milanović, Branko (2015). "After the Wall Fell: The Poor Balance Sheet of the Transition to Capitalism". Challenge. 58 (2): 135–138. doi:10.1080/05775132.2015.1012402. S2CID 153398717.
- Naftali, Timothy (Fall 2012). "The Malin Notes: Glimpses Inside the Kremlin during the Cuban Missile Crisis" (PDF). Cold War International History Project Bulletin (17/18). Woodrow Wilson International Center for Scholars. Archived (PDF) from the original on 27 March 2023.
- Nash, Philip (1 December 1993). "Nuclear Weapons in Kennedy's Foreign Policy". The Historian. 56 (2): 285–300. doi:10.1111/j.1540-6563.1994.tb01309.x. S2CID 145808004.
- Painter, D. S. (2014). "Oil and geopolitics: the oil crises of the 1970s and the Cold War". Historical Social Research. 39 (4): 186–208. doi:10.12759/hsr.39.2014.4.186-208.
- Patenaude, Bertrand M. (Spring 2020). "A Race against Anarchy". Hoover Digest. 2: 183–200. Archived from the original on 5 March 2023.
- Roberts, Geoffrey (2011). "Moscow's Cold War on the Periphery: Soviet Policy in Greece, Iran, and Turkey, 1943–8". Journal of Contemporary History. 46 (1): 58–81. doi:10.1177/0022009410383292. hdl:20.500.12323/1406. ISSN 0022-0094. JSTOR 25764609. S2CID 161542583.
- Ruzicic-Kessler, Karlo (2014). "Togliatti, Tito and the Shadow of Moscow 1944/45–1948: Post-War Territorial Disputes and the Communist World". Journal of European Integration History. 2:.
- Schwartz, Thomas A. (2011). "Henry Kissinger: Realism, Domestic Politics, and the Struggle Against Exceptionalism in American Foreign Policy". Diplomacy & Statecraft. 22 (1): 121–141. doi:10.1080/09592296.2011.549746.
- Shifrinson, J. R. I. (2016). "Deal or No Deal? The End of the Cold War and the U.S. Offer to Limit NATO Expansion". International Security. 40 (4): 7–44. doi:10.1162/ISEC_a_00236.
- Slocomb, Margaret (2001). "The K5 Gamble: National Defence and Nation Building under the People's Republic of Kampuchea". Journal of Southeast Asian Studies. 32 (2): 195–210. doi:10.1017/S0022463401000091. ISSN 1474-0680. S2CID 162956030.
- Singh, Bilveer (2005), "Chapter 11: Jemaah Islamiyah", in Swati, Parashar; Wilson, John (eds.), Terrorism in Southeast Asia: Implications for South Asia, Delhi, India: Pearson Education India, ISBN 978-81-297-0998-1
- Snyder, David R. (April 2002). "Arming the "Bundesmarine": The United States and the Build-Up of the German Federal Navy, 1950–1960". The Journal of Military History. 66 (2): 477–500. doi:10.2307/3093068. JSTOR 3093068.
- Stefancic, David (Winter 1987). "The Rapacki Plan: A Case Study of European Diplomacy". East European Quarterly. 21 (4): 401–412. ProQuest 1297275220
- Thomas, Daniel C. (2005). "Human Rights Ideas, the Demise of Communism, and the End of the Cold War". Journal of Cold War Studies. 7 (2): 110–141. doi:10.1162/1520397053630600. S2CID 57570614. Archived from the original on 4 March 2016.
- Tobin, Conor (April 2020). "The Myth of the "Afghan Trap": Zbigniew Brzezinski and Afghanistan, 1978–1979". Diplomatic History. 44 (2). Oxford University Press: 237–264. doi:10.1093/dh/dhz065.
- Treadaway, Dan (5 August 1996). "Carter stresses role of Olympics in promoting global harmony". Emory Report. 48 (37). Archived from the original on 22 June 2023.
- West, Nigel (1 March 2002). "'Venona': the British dimension". Intelligence and National Security. 17 (1): 117–134. doi:10.1080/02684520412331306440. ISSN 0268-4527. S2CID 145696471.

=== Magazine articles ===
- Das, Saswato R. (16 July 2009). "The Moon Landing through Soviet Eyes: A Q&A with Sergei Khrushchev, son of former premier Nikita Khrushchev". Scientific American. Archived from the original on 25 February 2021.
- Klesius, Mike (19 December 2008). "To Boldly Go". Smithsonian Magazine. Archived from the original on 5 November 2022.
- Lowry, Brian (26 February 2015). "The Americans". Variety. Archived from the original on 26 February 2015.
- Matray, James I. (Summer 2002). "Revisiting Korea: Exposing Myths of the Forgotten War". Prologue Magazine. Vol. 34, no. 2. National Archives. Archived from the original on 21 June 2019.

=== News articles ===
- Ash, Lucy (1 May 2016). "The rape of Berlin". BBC News. Archived from the original on 25 March 2021.
- Bamford, James (4 July 2003). "Books of The Times; The Labyrinthine Morass of Spying in the Cold War". New York Times. Archived from the original on 9 November 2017.
- Bevins, Vincent (20 October 2017). "What the United States Did in Indonesia". The Atlantic. Archived from the original on 1 February 2020.
- Bradner, Eric (2015). "Newly released documents reveal U.S. Cold War nuclear target list". CNN Politics. Archived from the original on 22 October 2019.
- Feeney, Mark (29 March 2006). "Caspar W. Weinberger, 88; Architect of Massive Pentagon Buildup". The Boston Globe. Archived from the original on 29 May 2014.
- Glass, Andrew (16 April 2016). "Bernard Baruch coins term 'Cold War,' April 16, 1947". Politico. Archived from the original on 13 November 2022.
- Glass, Andrew (14 October 2017). "McNamara becomes Vietnam War skeptic, Oct. 14, 1966". Politico. Archived from the original on 9 May 2019.
- Hoffman, David (10 February 1999). "I Had A Funny Feeling in My Gut". The Washington Post. Archived from the original on 30 November 2011.
- Keller, Bill (26 October 1989). "Gorbachev, in Finland, Disavows Any Right of Regional Intervention". The New York Times. ISSN 0362-4331. Archived from the original on 22 August 2019.
- Khotin, Rostyslav (27 November 2009). "Ukraine tears down controversial statue". BBC News. Archived from the original on 19 October 2017.
- Lebow, Richard Ned; Stein, Janice Gross (February 1994). "Reagan and the Russians". The Atlantic. Archived from the original on 31 December 2016.
- Lehto, Mika (19 September 2018). "Näin Neuvostoliitto vakoili Suomessa – Supo seurasi "Jakkea", joka johdatti uusille jäljille" [This is how the Soviet Union spied in Finland – Supo followed "Jakke", who led to new tracks]. Ilta-Sanomat (in Finnish). Archived from the original on 11 August 2020.
- McCormick, Lynde (3 July 1980). "Deal-maker Armand Hammer Moscow's capitalist comrade". Christian Science Monitor. ISSN 0882-7729. Archived from the original on 19 January 2021.
- Nzongola-Ntalaja, Georges (17 January 2011). "Patrice Lumumba: the most important assassination of the 20th century". The Guardian. Archived from the original on 23 October 2019.
- Orwell, George (19 October 1945). "You and the Atomic Bomb". Tribune.
- Orwell, George (10 March 1946). "Russia began to make a 'cold war' on Britain and the British Empire". The Observer.
- Perry, Juliet (21 July 2016). "Tribunal finds Indonesia guilty of 1965 genocide; US, UK complicit". CNN. Archived from the original on 8 June 2019.
- Rosenberg, Steve (19 August 2016). "The Russians with fond memories of the USSR". BBC News. Archived from the original on 21 August 2016.
- Roth, Andrew (23 August 2019). "Molotov-Ribbentrop: why is Moscow trying to justify Nazi pact?". The Guardian.
- Safire, William (1 October 2006). "Language: Islamofascism, anyone? – Editorials & Commentary – International Herald Tribune". Opinion. The New York Times. Archived from the original on 17 January 2012.
- Scott, Margaret (26 October 2017). "Uncovering Indonesia's Act of Killing". The New York Review of Books. Archived from the original on 25 June 2018.
- Shevchenko, Vitaly (14 April 2015). "Goodbye, Lenin: Ukraine moves to ban communist symbols". BBC News. Archived from the original on 17 April 2015.
- Talbott, Strobe; Hannifin, Jerry; Magnuson, Ed; Doerner, William R.; Kane, Joseph J. (12 September 1983). "Atrocity in the skies". Time. Archived from the original on 12 June 2008.
- Taylor, Adam (26 November 2016). "Before 'fake news,' there was Soviet 'disinformation'". Washington Post. ISSN 0190-8286. Archived from the original on 14 May 2019.
- Thaler, Kai (2 December 2015). "50 years ago today, American diplomats endorsed mass killings in Indonesia. Here's what that means for today". The Washington Post. Archived from the original on 5 June 2019.

=== Web ===
- Allen, Richard V. (30 January 2000). "The Man Who Won the Cold War". Hoover Institution. Archived from the original on 13 July 2026.
- Čulík, Jan (21 August 1998). "Den, kdy tanky zlikvidovaly české sny Pražského jara". Britské Listy. Archived from the original on 28 September 2007.
- Dietz, Jason (8 December 2013). "2013 Film Critic Top Ten Lists". Metacritic. Archived from the original on 11 December 2013.
- Harriman, Pamela C. (Winter 1987–1988). "Churchill and ... Politics: The True Meaning of the Iron Curtain Speech". Winston Churchill Centre. Archived from the original on 15 October 2007.
- Kalb, Marvin (22 January 2013). "It's Called the Vietnam Syndrome, and It's Back". Brookings Institution. Archived from the original on 13 June 2015.
- Von Geldern, James; Siegelbaum, Lewis. "The Soviet-led Intervention in Czechoslovakia". Soviethistory.org. Archived from the original on 17 August 2009.
- "Address given by Mikhail Gorbachev to the Council of Europe". Centre Virtuel de la Connaissance sur l'Europe. 6 July 1989. Archived from the original on 27 September 2007.
- "Milestones: 1945–1952 – Office of the Historian". history.state.gov. Archived from the original on 18 January 2020.
- "Milestones: 1969–1976 – Office of the Historian". history.state.gov. Archived from the original on 11 June 2019.
- "Report by Soviet Deputy Interior Minister M.N. Holodkov to Interior Minister N. P. Dudorov (15 November 1956)" (PDF). The 1956 Hungarian Revolution, A History in Documents. George Washington University: The National Security Archive. 4 November 2002. Archived (PDF) from the original on 8 September 2006.
- "Cambodia: U.S. bombing, civil war, & Khmer Rouge". World Peace Foundation. 7 August 2015. Archived from the original on 14 July 2019.
