= Final Report of the Task Force on Combating Terrorist and Foreign Fighter Travel =

2015 report

- Book cover
- Author: United States House Committee on Homeland Security; Malcolm Nance (foreword)
- Language: English
- Subject: Counterterrorism
- Genre: Warfare
- Publisher: United States Government Publishing Office
- Publication date: 2015
- Publication place: United States
- Media type: Paperback, Ebook
- Pages: 96
- ISBN: 978-1-5107-1238-6 (Skyhorse paperback edition)
- OCLC: 965469828

Final Report of the Task Force on Combating Terrorist and Foreign Fighter Travel is a report about counterterrorism and foreign fighters in the Syrian and Iraqi Civil Wars by a bipartisan task force of the United States House Committee on Homeland Security, with a foreword by cryptology analyst and author Malcolm Nance. The work was released by the United States Government Publishing Office in 2015 as an unillustrated committee print, by the United States House Committee on Homeland Security in September 2015 in an illustrated edition, and as a paperback book in 2016 by Skyhorse Publishing. The report discusses United States citizens leaving their country to gain fighting experience in Iraq and Syria on the battlefield. It notes some linked up with the Syrian Civil War in order to attempt to remove Syrian leader Bashar al-Assad from power, later joining ISIS. According to the work, approximately 4,500 from the Western world left their countries to join ISIS, including over 250 American citizens. The report gives thirty-two recommendations to address the problem, including tactics to stop travels of battlefield soldiers to and from their countries of origin, ways to change executive branch policies, and methods to determine which individuals are planning terrorist activities.

U.S. Homeland Security Secretary Jeh Johnson spoke highly of the report and thanked the Committee for their efforts. Interpol leader Jürgen Stock said the recommendations emphasized the need for sovereign states to give materials to each other in collaborative counterterrorism efforts. Anthony D'Amato wrote for the Georgetown Security Studies Review that the report's recommendations were a way to address the "critical process" and "formulate a strategy on disrupting foreign fighter travel in the 21st century." The Brookings Institution cited the report for information on terrorist recruitment tactics.

The report significantly affected on the U.S. legislative process related to counterterrorism objectives. Representative Martha McSally spoke out on the floor of the United States House of Representatives in favor the Tracking Foreign Fighters in Terrorist Safe Havens Act, House Resolution 4239. Another bill based on the report, Counterterrorism Screening and Assistance Act of 2016, House Resolution 4314, passed the U.S. House of Representatives in 2016. Yet another bill in the U.S. House of Representatives, the Terrorist and Foreign Fighter Travel Exercise Act of 2016, House Resolution 4404, was proposed based upon research from the report. The bill was successfully reported to the full U.S. House of Representatives out of committee, as the Terrorist and Foreign Fighter Travel Exercise Act of 2017, H. Rept. 115-40. It unanimously passed the full U.S. House of Representatives in 2017, as Terrorist and Foreign Fighter Travel Exercise Act, H.R. 1302.

== Background ==
Combating Terrorist and Foreign Fighter Travel was a bipartisan task force made up of members from the United States House Committee on Homeland Security, begun in 2015. Its leadership included chairman Congressman Michael McCaul and ranking member Congressman Bennie Thompson, and lead members John Katko and Loretta Sanchez. Additional membership included United States Representatives Barry Loudermilk, Filemon Vela Jr., John Ratcliffe, Donald Payne Jr., Will Hurd, and Martha McSally. The writer of the book's foreword, Malcolm Nance, is a retired U.S. Navy Senior Chief Petty Officer in naval cryptology, who served in the U.S. Navy from 1981-2001. His books on the subject matter of the report include: The Terrorists of Iraq, An End to al-Qaeda, Terrorist Recognition Handbook, Defeating ISIS, and Hacking ISIS.

The need for the report was emphasized prior to its executive summary with quotations from President of the United States Barack Obama, FBI director James Comey and former United States Attorney General Eric Holder. Obama warned that with globalization came an increased risk of terrorists passing through the borders of the United States in order to cause harm to U.S. citizens. Comey wrote that terrorists who had garnered battlefield experience in Iraq and Syria posed a threat if they were able to travel to the U.S. Holder said the Syrian Civil War created a fertile bed for Islamic extremism and the U.S. needed to be alert to prevent U.S. citizens from traveling there and returning to their country of origin to commit attacks. During the course of their research for the report, members of the bipartisan task force traveled to foreign countries in order to speak with government workers and intelligence community leaders about the subject matter to gain more expertise in the area. Work for the report's publication was completed in 2015. The book was first published in paperback format by Skyhorse Publishing in 2016. An e-book edition was released the same year.

== Contents summary ==
The report discusses the significant problem of United States citizens leaving their country of origin in order to gain fighting experience in Iraq and Syria on the battlefield. The report documents that the amount of U.S. citizens who have tried to gain access to battlefield areas in order to fight alongside foreign terrorists numbers in the hundreds. The report faults the Obama Administration for failing to take enough action on the matter, writing, "The U.S. government lacks a national strategy for combating terrorist travel and has not produced one in nearly a decade."

The report notes that subsequent to 2011 citizens from 100 different sovereign states have left their countries of origin in order to join the battlefields in Iraq and Syria. The first waves of individuals joined the Syrian Civil War in order to attempt to remove Syrian leader Bashar al-Assad from power. The majority of these individuals then afterwards joined up with the Islamic State of Iraq and the Levant (ISIS) in an attempt to grow the global expansion of the terrorist group. According to the work, approximately 25,000 individuals left their home countries to join ISIS and related terrorist initiatives; this figure includes about 4,500 from the Western world and more specifically over 250 American citizens.

The authors of the report back up their conclusions with multiple primary source documents including travel to the areas in question, interviews with subjects, examination of key records, and prior briefings to the United States House Committee on Homeland Security. The report recommends thirty-two main objectives to the United States Executive Branch, including tactics to stop travels of battlefield soldiers to and from their countries of origin, ways to change executive branch policies, and methods to determine which individuals are planning terrorist activities.

Significant conclusions of the report include the main objective, that American foreign policy and homeland security policies must adapt to better stem the tide of U.S. citizens traveling to and from distant battlefields. The report identifies police officials from the non-federal level who have cited their own personal worries about lack of resources in the form of security clearances in order to help the federal government deal with counterterrorism. The report identifies weak spots along the chain of foreign travel where terrorists are able to slip out of counterterrorism oversight capabilities. The authors of the work describe holes in law enforcement checkpoints both within the United States and more significantly in European countries where it is increasingly not difficult for terrorists to travel back and forth to the Western world.

The Skyhorse paperback edition includes a foreword by Malcolm Nance that gives background on the conclusions of the report. Nance emphasizes the significant necessity of a coherent plan to stem American terrorists from exiting the country and then returning again from war-torn zones in order to commit criminal acts back in their home country. Nance concludes his foreword writing, "This Final Report of the Task Force on Combating Terrorist and Foreign Fighter Travel is a keystone study of ISIS's ability to recruit terrorists from or in their home nations to abandon all they have ever known and launch themselves as a virtually programmed corps of human guided weapons globally."

== Reception ==
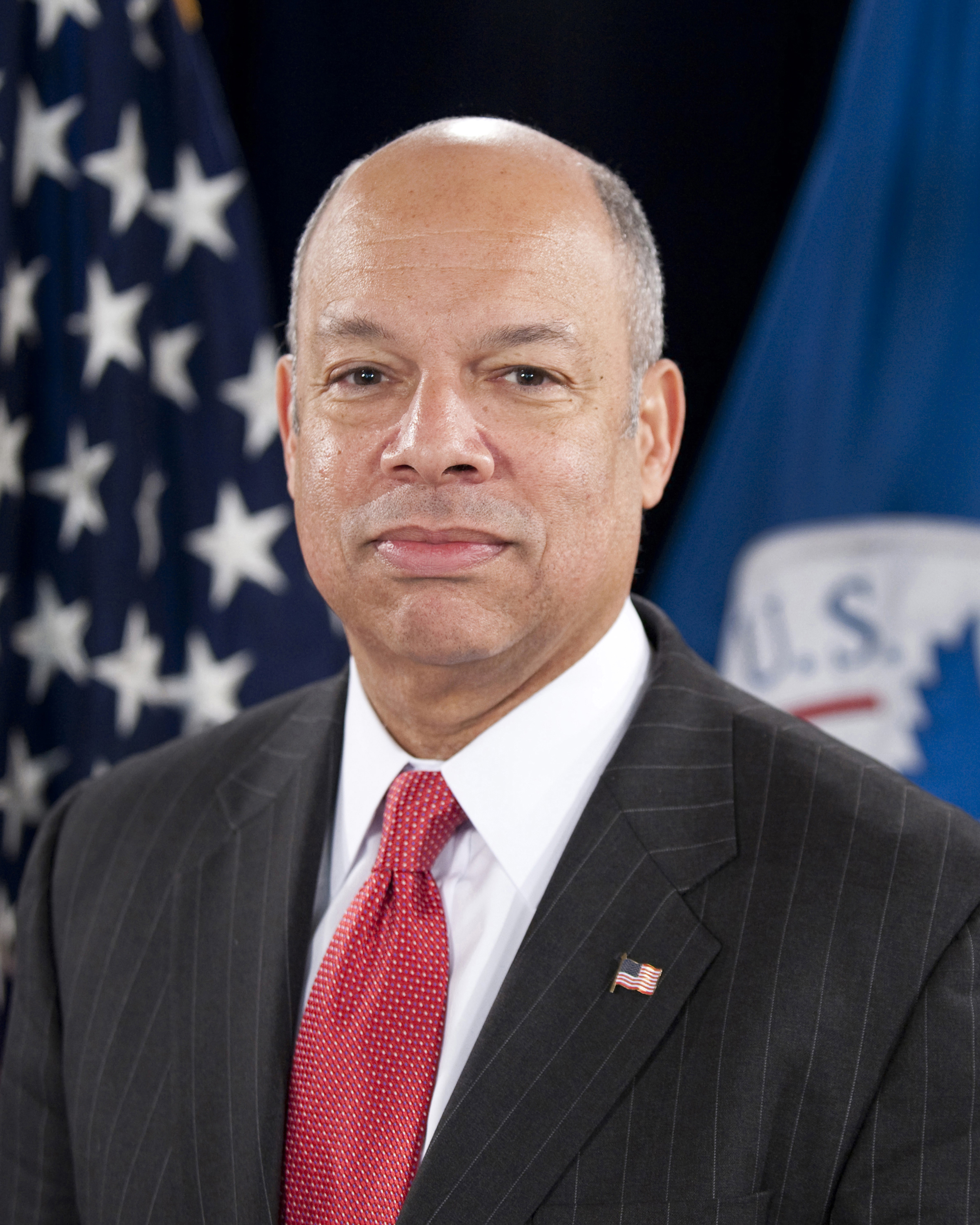
U.S. Homeland Security Secretary Jeh Johnson spoke highly of the report and thanked the Committee.

United States Secretary of Homeland Security Jeh Johnson wrote positively of the report, saying, "I thank the House Homeland Security Committee, in particular Chairman McCaul and Ranking Member Thompson, for their work examining the critical issue of foreign terrorist fighters traveling to Syria and Iraq. The report published by the Committee’s bipartisan task force is an important assessment of how we in the U.S. government can enhance our efforts to counter the foreign terrorist fighter threat." Johnson concluded, "The threat of foreign terrorist fighters requires the comprehensive efforts of all our partner agencies and allied nations. We will continue to adapt to this evolving threat and take necessary action to protect the American public. As we move forward, my Department will maintain a close working relationship with Congress on this issue."

Interpol praised the recommendations in the document, with the United States Department of Justice reporting about its leader Jürgen Stock, "Welcoming the report, Interpol Secretary General Jürgen Stock said its findings once again underlined the absolute necessity for countries to share information on foreign terrorist fighters."

Anthony D'Amato wrote for the Georgetown Security Studies Review that, "In the age of unprecedented global connectedness and mass communication, we have to formulate a strategy on disrupting foreign fighter travel in the 21st century. Policymakers can start this critical process by examining the findings of the Homeland Security Committee Task Force’s Final Report on Combating Foreign Fighter Travel." D'Amato concluded, "While the Homeland Security Committee report does not offer any lasting solutions to the crisis we are in, one thing is certain: if we keep doing what we are doing, we will most certainly be further away from that vision of a world without terrorist organizations than we were a few years ago." The report became a resource cited by the Brookings Institution which noted terrorist entities use tools online in order to promote violent extremism via the Web to their followers and for recruitment purposes.

== Impact ==
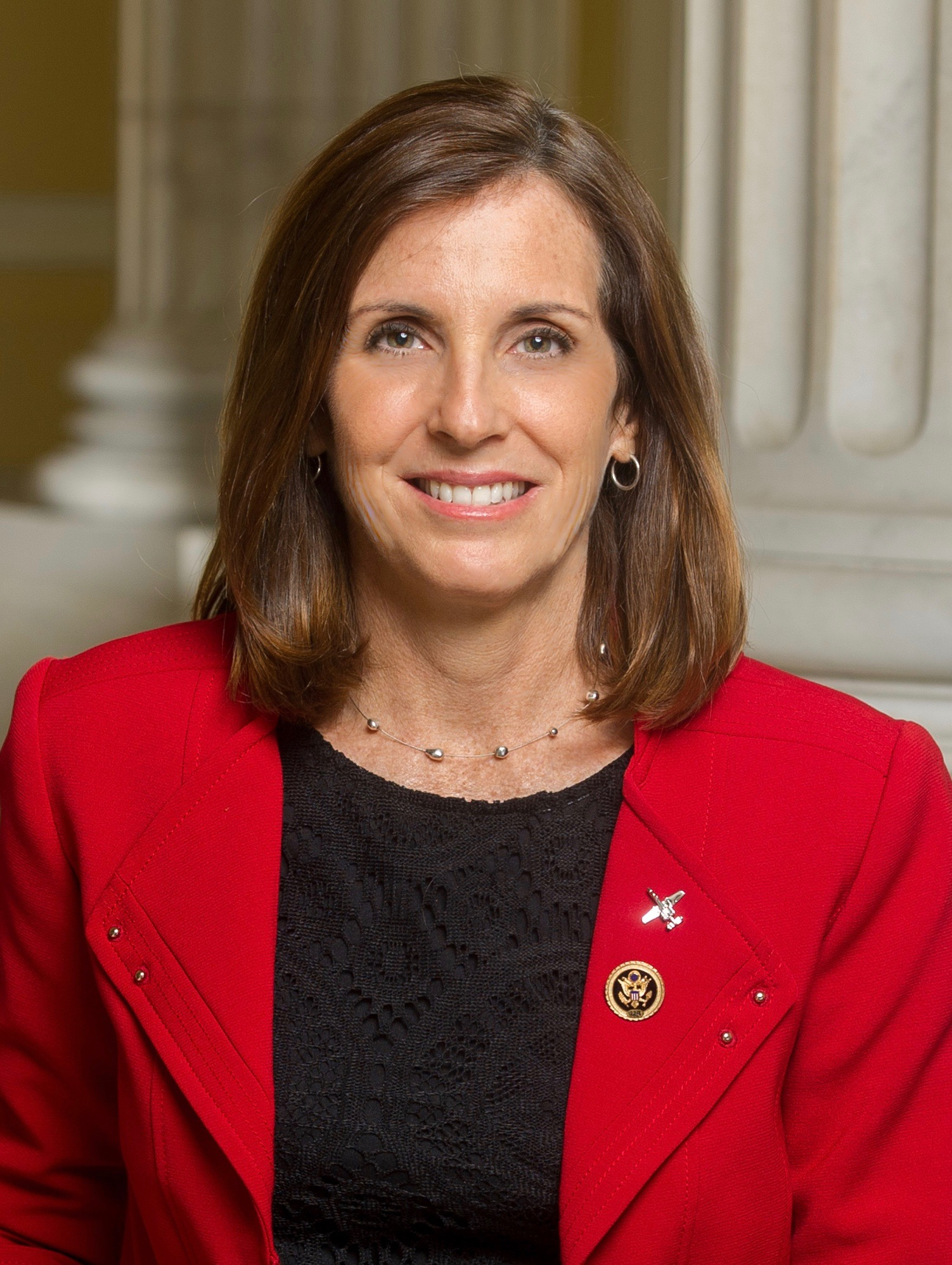
Representative Martha McSally sponsored legislation based on the report, which unanimously passed the full U.S. House of Representatives in 2017.

Final Report of the Task Force on Combating Terrorist and Foreign Fighter Travel influenced subsequent legislation in the United States Congress about counterterrorism prevention and response. Representative Martha McSally spoke out on the floor of the United States House of Representatives in favor the Tracking Foreign Fighters in Terrorist Safe Havens Act, House Resolution 4239. Representative McSally cited her experiences and work on the task force a part of her rationale for supporting the resolution, which she called "important legislation". McSally noted the suggestions to the Executive Branch of the United States made in the report, and noted the bill, is "the direct result of one of these recommendations."

Another bill based on the report, Counterterrorism Screening and Assistance Act of 2016, House Resolution 4314, passed the U.S. House of Representatives in 2016. Homeland Security Committee Chairman Michael McCaul said of the bill's passage in the U.S. House, "Nearly 40,000 jihadists from around the world have gone to fight in Syria and Iraq with groups like ISIS. Today the House acted decisively to shut down the jihadist superhighway that allows extremists to get to their safe havens—and return to the West, prepared to strike America and our allies. This legislation will streamline and elevate U.S. efforts to combat terrorist travel and make sure we are focusing our attention where it is needed most."

Yet another bill in the U.S. House of Representatives, the Terrorist and Foreign Fighter Travel Exercise Act of 2016, House Resolution 4404, was proposed based upon research from the report. Sponsored by Martha McSally, the bill would require "the Department of Homeland Security (DHS) to develop and conduct an exercise to evaluate the nation’s preparedness against the threat of foreign fighters and terrorists." H.R. 4404 would necessitate the Department of Homeland Security to carry out a practice "scenario involving persons traveling from the United States to join or provide material support resources to a terrorist organization abroad and terrorist infiltration into the United States". The bill was successfully reported to the full U.S. House of Representatives out of committee, as the Terrorist and Foreign Fighter Travel Exercise Act of 2017, H. Rept. 115-40. The bill passed the full U.S. House of Representatives in 2017. It was passed unanimously in the U.S. House as Terrorist and Foreign Fighter Travel Exercise Act, H.R. 1302.

== See also ==
- List of books about al-Qaeda
- Arab Spring
- Iraq War
- Islam and violence
- Islamic extremism
- Islamic fundamentalism
- Islamic terrorism
- Muslim attitudes toward terrorism
- Syrian Civil War
- War in Afghanistan (2001–present)
