= Defeating ISIS =

2016 book by Malcolm Nance

- Defeating ISIS
- Author: Malcolm Nance; Richard Engel (foreword)
- Language: English
- Subject: Islamic State of Iraq and the Levant (ISIS)
- Genre: Counterterrorism
- Publisher: Skyhorse Publishing
- Publication date: 2016
- Publication place: United States
- Media type: Hardcover
- Pages: 544
- ISBN: 978-1510711846
- OCLC: 980515128
- Preceded by: The Terrorists of Iraq
- Followed by: The Plot to Hack America
- Website: Official website

Defeating ISIS: Who They Are, How They Fight, What They Believe is a non-fiction book about counterterrorism against ISIS. It was written by Malcolm Nance, a former cryptology analyst, with a foreword by Richard Engel. Its thesis is that ISIS is not part of Islam, instead, it functions as a separate destructive extremist group. He emphasizes the fact that the majority of those who have been harmed by ISIS are themselves Muslim. The book traces the history of the movement back to the history of Al-Qaeda in Iraq, and it also discusses ISIS's combat style and recruiting tactics. Nance offers a four-point plan to defeat ISIS, including airpower and special forces, Internet tactics, strengthening the Syrian military, and engaging Arab world states.

== Synopsis ==
Defeating ISIS argues that the group ISIS does not belong to the faith of Islam, and should instead be thought of as a separate destructive extremist group. The work is organized into four sections. The author provides historical context for the evolution of ISIS over time. The book emphasizes that the majority of ISIS's victims are Muslim. He argues that ISIS is attempting to annihilate Islam itself, and instead replace it with its own more inhumane practices.

Nance ties the history of ISIS back to changing developments within Al-Qaeda. Nance ascribes growth of influence by ISIS directly to problems within U.S. leadership related to combating Al-Qaeda in Iraq. He provides an overview of ISIS management, soldiers, and command format. Defeating ISIS provides geographic descriptions of ISIS centers of influence globally, including Mali, Algeria, Tunisia, Egypt, Libya, Lebanon, and Jordan. Nance discusses cultural differences within each locality. He details the practices of Boko Haram. He describes the Western influence of ISIS into countries including France, the U.S., Australia, and Turkey. He recounts the November 2015 Paris attacks and response to the incident. He provides the reader with a basis of ISIS operations within countries in Asia, states in the region of the Arabian Peninsula, Afghanistan, and Arab states of the Persian Gulf.

The book describes the terrorist group's attempts to remake the world through jihad. Nance grounds the reader within the context of Islamic history, including the Battle of Nahrawan, controversy regarding Shia–Sunni relations, evolution of the Qarmatians, and the Mahdist War. Defeating ISIS details tactics of ISIS manipulation including psychological manipulation, behavior modification, and brainwashing. Nance writes that these strategies lead to gross violations of human rights, including sexual assault and child soldiers. Defeating ISIS describes ISIS combat tactics, with analysis of their armaments. Nance writes that ISIS usually engages in the military tactics of mountain warfare and frontal assault, later encouraging each other through social media discussing their combat operations.

Defeating ISIS concludes with a strategy proposed by the author to weaken the organization both their combat operations and their ability to garner new followers. Nance lays forth a four-point plan, including: combat strategy with increased incorporation of airpower and special forces units, tactics to combat ISIS over the Internet, revitalization of the Syrian Armed Forces, and enlisting increased support from Arab world countries.

== Research and writing ==
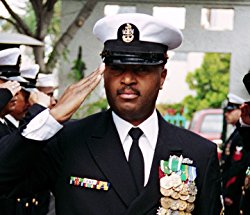
Malcolm Nance, author of Defeating ISIS

Malcolm Nance is a retired cryptology analyst. He garnered expertise within the field of intelligence analysis. Nance served in the U.S. Navy for 20 years, from 1981 to 2001. He devoted years researching Middle East terrorism. Nance founded a company providing advice to U.S. Special Operations, and created a survival tactics training center. He manages a think tank consisting of CIA and counterterrorism officers. His books on intelligence include An End to al-Qaeda, Terrorist Recognition Handbook, The Terrorists of Iraq, The Plot to Hack America, and Hacking ISIS.

Prior to his work on Defeating ISIS, Nance had already extensively researched the topic, while writing a treatise specifically geared for the intelligence community to educate them in textbook format on the growth over time of Al-Qaeda in Iraq. Defeating ISIS was contracted for publication with Skyhorse Publishing in November 2015, originally slated for a January 2017 release date.

== Publication ==
Defeating ISIS was published in 2016 by Skyhorse Publishing in print format. An e-book was published the same year. It went through two more editions in 2016. W. W. Norton & Company published another edition in 2017.

Defeating ISIS made The New York Times Best Seller list at number nine for the week of July 3, 2016, in the section for "E-Book Nonfiction". U.S. President Donald Trump told Time magazine he read Defeating ISIS while he was a candidate for president in July 2016.

== Reception ==
U.S. Air Force Office of Special Investigations retired Colonel Millard E. Moon reviewed the book for Journal of Strategic Security, and wrote, "Nance offers a compelling argument to support the concept of the Islamic State of Iraq and Syria (ISIS) as a cult set apart from the Islamic religion." Moon said that, "Nance has done a really good job of providing detailed information about the growth and activities of ISIS components". He praised the author's ability to structure the book as a reference resource, writing, "there is a wealth of factual information on ISIS". As for the religious nature of the organization, Moon acknowledged, "Malcolm Nance does an excellent job of outlining what ISIS believes". Moon concluded, "This book is a good reference source for anyone in the professional field and for individuals seeking to understand the enemy and what we and our allies face."

Current Affairs journalist Adam Patterson called the book "One of the more intelligent, incisive mass-market books on ISIS." Patterson emphasized, "The central value of Nance's work is ultimately written into its title. Defeating ISIS outlines that the jihadi group can, with intelligent application of diplomatic and counterinsurgency methods, be eventually defeated." Rachel Maddow referenced this book as a source she used to educate herself about ISIS. The book received a negative review by Paul Monk in The Australian. Monk criticized the writing style, and disputed Nance's view that ISIS wished "to destroy Islam". The Guardian national security reporter Spencer Ackerman praised the author's expertise, citing the caliber of his works The Terrorists of Iraq and Defeating ISIS.

== See also ==
- Refuting ISIS
- List of books about al-Qaeda
- 2016 Brussels bombings
- Arab Spring
- Iraq War
- Islam and violence
- Islamic extremism
- Islamic fundamentalism
- Islamic terrorism
- Muslim attitudes toward terrorism
- Syrian Civil War
- War in Afghanistan (2001–present)
