= Malcolm Nance =

American author and Navy officer (born 1961)

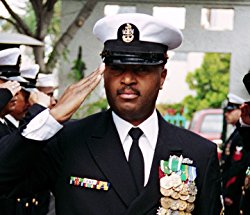
- Born: Malcolm Wrightson Nance; 1961 (age 64–65); Philadelphia, Pennsylvania, U.S.
- Education: Excelsior University (BA)
- Occupations: Author; counterterrorism and intelligence commentator
- Years active: 1981–present
- Known for: National security; Counterterrorism intelligence; Islamic extremism; SERE
- Notable work: Terrorist Recognition Handbook; An End to al-Qaeda; The Terrorists of Iraq; Defeating ISIS; The Plot to Hack America
- Title: Executive Director, Terror Asymmetrics Project on Strategy, Tactics and Radical Ideologies (TAPSTRI)
- Military career
- Allegiance: United States; Ukraine
- Branch: United States Navy; Territorial Defense Forces
- Service years: 1981–2001 (United States); 2022–present (Ukraine)
- Rank: Senior chief petty officer (United States)
- Unit: International Legion (Ukraine)
- Conflicts: Iran–Iraq War; Lebanese Civil War; 1983 Beirut barracks bombings; Operation Praying Mantis; Bosnian War; Operation Deliberate Force; Russo-Ukrainian War
- Website: tapstri.org

Malcolm Wrightson Nance (born 1961) is an American author and media pundit. He is a former United States Navy Senior Chief Petty Officer specializing in naval cryptology.

Nance is an intelligence and foreign policy analyst who frequently discusses the history, personalities, and organization of jihadi radicalization and al-Qaeda and the Islamic State of Iraq and Levant (ISIS), Southwest Asian and African terror groups, as well as counterinsurgency and asymmetric warfare. He has learned Arabic and is active in the field of national security policy particularly, in anti- and counter-terrorism intelligence, terrorist strategy and tactics, torture and counter-ideology in combating Islamic extremism. In 2016, he published the book, Defeating ISIS: Who They Are, How They Fight, What They Believe, and published The Plot to Hack America the same year.

In 2014, he founded and became the executive director of the Terror Asymmetrics Project on Strategy, Tactics and Radical Ideologies (TAPSTRI), a Hudson, New York–based think tank.

== Early life and education ==
Nance was born to African-American parents in Philadelphia in 1961. He attended the city's West Catholic Boys High School. He studied Spanish, French, and Latin, and took advantage of free classes in Russian and Chinese offered at South Philadelphia High School on Saturdays. In 2011, he received a Bachelor of Arts degree from New York's Excelsior University.

== Military career ==
Nance served in the United States Navy from 1981 to 2001. As a U.S. Navy specialist in Naval Cryptology, Nance was involved in numerous counter-terrorism, intelligence, and combat operations. He garnered expertise within the fields of intelligence and counterterrorism.

He was an instructor in wartime and peacetime Survival, Evasion, Resistance, and Escape (SERE), training Navy and Marine Corps pilots and aircrew how to survive as prisoners of war. There, Nance helped to initiate the Advanced Terrorism, Abduction and Hostage Survival course of instruction.

Nance took part in combat operations that occurred after the 1983 Beirut barracks bombings, was peripherally involved with the 1986 United States bombing of Libya, served on USS Wainwright during Operation Praying Mantis and was aboard during the sinking of the Iranian missile boat Joshan, served on USS Tripoli during the Gulf War, and assisted during a Banja Luka, Bosnia air strike.

== Post-military career ==
=== Intelligence and counterterrorism expertise ===
In 2001, Nance founded Special Readiness Services International (SRSI), an intelligence support company. On the morning of 9/11, driving to Arlington he witnessed the crash of American Airlines Flight 77 into the Pentagon. He acted as a first responder at the helipad crash site where he helped organize the rescue and recovery of victims. Subsequently, Nance served as an intelligence and security contractor in Iraq, Afghanistan, the United Arab Emirates and North Africa.

Between 2005 and 2007 Nance was a visiting lecturer on counterterrorism in Sydney, Australia at Macquarie University's Centre on Policing, Intelligence, and Counter-terrorism (PICT) and at Victoria University of Wellington in Wellington, New Zealand.

Nance now directs a think tank that he founded, the "Terror Asymmetrics Project on Strategy, Tactics and Radical Ideologies", which analyzes counterterrorism. Nance is also a member of the advisory board of directors for the International Spy Museum in Washington, D.C.

Nance's books on counterterrorism and intelligence include: An End to al-Qaeda, Terrorist Recognition Handbook, The Terrorists of Iraq, Defeating ISIS, The Plot to Hack America, and Hacking ISIS. In 2018, he published The Plot to Destroy Democracy: How Putin and His Spies Are Undermining America and Dismantling the West. In 2019, he published The Plot to Betray America: How Team Trump Embraced Our Enemies, Compromised Our Security, and How We Can Fix It.

=== Opposition to waterboarding ===
In 2007, Nance wrote an article criticizing waterboarding for the counterinsurgency blog Small Wars Journal titled "Waterboarding is Torture... period." Nance wrote: "I know waterboarding is torture—because I did it myself." Nance said he witnessed and supervised waterboarding of hundreds of people.

Republished in the Pentagon Early Bird, it set off a firestorm as the first credible description of the torture technique as used in SERE. The article strongly swayed the Pentagon against the use of the waterboard because its misuse would damage America's reputation worldwide. Nance argued that using the torture techniques of America's former enemies dishonors the memory of U.S. service members who died in captivity through torture, and that torture does not produce credible intelligence.

Nance was called to testify before the U.S. Congress about the use of "enhanced interrogation techniques". He told the House Judiciary Committee that: "Waterboarding is torture, period... I believe that we must reject the use of the waterboard for prisoners and captives and cleanse this stain from our national honor...water overpowering your gag reflex, and then feel(ing) your throat open and allow pint after pint of water to involuntarily fill your lungs."

=== Criticism of Donald Trump ===
Nance has suggested that Donald Trump was under surveillance by Russian intelligence as early as 1977. Nance elaborated, "First, you start off as a useful idiot, right? Next is unwitting assets... a person who doesn’t know that there was an intelligence operation around him. The next progression is a witting asset. I have never said the next step. I have never said Donald Trump was an agent of Russia."

On March 22, 2019, hours before Attorney General William Barr's controversial letter about the Mueller Report on the 2016 Trump campaign and its connections to Russia was released, Nance said the report could reveal treason exceeding that of Benedict Arnold.

=== Joins Ukrainian Foreign Legion following Russian invasion ===
On April 18, 2022, Nance revealed that he had joined the Ukrainian Foreign Legion in March 2022. In an interview with Michael Harriot of The Guardian, Nance likened African-American military aviator Eugene Bullard's service in the French Foreign Legion to his own service in Ukraine, hoping to inspire "African Americans and young Americans who have been in the military", and describing the International Legion as "the pantheon of the defense of democracy in the defense of Ukraine".

== Personal life ==
Nance was married to Maryse Beliveau-Nance, who died from ovarian cancer in 2019.

In the 2024 United States presidential election, Nance endorsed Kamala Harris.

== Filmography ==
- Torturing Democracy, 2008 (panel commentator).
- Dirty Wars, 2013 (interviewee).
- Trump: The Kremlin Candidate?, 2017 (interviewee).
- Unfit: The Psychology of Donald Trump, 2020 (interviewee).

== Bibliography ==
- An End to al-Qaeda: Destroying Bin Laden's Jihad and Restoring America's Honor. St. Martin's. 2010. ISBN 978-0312592493.
- Terrorist Recognition Handbook: A Practitioner's Manual for Predicting and Identifying Terrorist Activity. CRC Press. 2013. ISBN 978-1466554573.
- The Terrorists of Iraq: Inside the Strategy and Tactics of the Iraq Insurgency 2003–2014. CRC Press. 2014. ISBN 978-1498706896.
- The Plot to Hack America: How Putin's Cyberspies and WikiLeaks Tried to Steal the 2016 Election. Skyhorse Publishing. 2016.
- Defeating ISIS: Who They Are, How They Fight, What They Believe. Skyhorse Publishing. 2016. ISBN 978-1510711846..
- Combating Terrorist and Foreign Fighter Travel task force of the U.S. House Homeland Security Committee; Nance, Malcolm (foreword) (2016), Final Report of the Task Force on Combating Terrorist and Foreign Fighter Travel, Skyhorse Publishing, ISBN 978-1510712386
- Hacking ISIS: How to Destroy the Cyber Jihad. Skyhorse Publishing. 2017. ISBN 978-1510718920.
- The Plot to Destroy Democracy: How Putin and His Spies Are Undermining America and Dismantling the West. Hachette. 2018. ISBN 978-0316484817.
- The Plot to Betray America: How Team Trump Embraced Our Enemies, Compromised Our Security, and How We Can Fix It. Hachette. 2019. ISBN 978-0316535762.
- They Want to Kill Americans: The Militias, Terrorists, and Deranged Ideology of the Trump Insurgency. St. Martin's Press. 2022. ISBN 9781250279002.
