= The Terrorists of Iraq =

2014 book by Malcolm Nance

- The Terrorists of Iraq
- Author: Malcolm Nance
- Language: English
- Subject: Terrorism
- Genre: Warfare
- Publisher: CRC Press
- Publication date: 2014
- Publication place: United States
- Media type: Paperback
- Pages: 404
- ISBN: 978-1498706896
- OCLC: 935554212
- Preceded by: An End to al-Qaeda
- Followed by: Defeating ISIS
- Website: Official website

The Terrorists of Iraq: Inside the Strategy and Tactics of the Iraq Insurgency 2003–2014 is a nonfiction book about the Iraqi insurgency, written by U.S. Navy retired cryptology analyst Malcolm Nance. It was published by CRC Press in 2014. The book discusses the terrorist evolution of the Iraqi insurgency which led to the formation of Islamic State of Iraq and the Levant (ISIS). Nance cites the 2003 Iraq war by the Bush administration for causing regional instability. He criticizes Coalition Provisional Authority leader Paul Bremer. The book emphasizes lessons the U.S. neglected to learn from the Vietnam War, the Iraqi revolt against the British, and the South Lebanon conflict. Nance writes in favor of the Iran nuclear deal framework by the Obama administration, saying it is in the interests of all parties involved.

A review of the book in the journal Behavioral Sciences of Terrorism and Political Aggression recommended the work, writing The Terrorists of Iraq, "offers enormous precious experience and empirical data which make it attractive to policy-makers". The Times of Israel published a book review which was praiseworthy of the author's expertise, writing, "For those that want to truly understand the Iraq conflict and its surrounding issues, Nance is eminently qualified and this book is uniquely superb."

Christopher Hitchens wrote for Vanity Fair, "The Terrorists of Iraq, is a highly potent analysis...of the jihadist threat". Ben Rothke placed the book among "The Best Information Security Books of 2015", in a post for The Security Reading Room. Spencer Ackerman said Nance's books The Terrorists of Iraq and Defeating ISIS reflected the caliber of his expertise in the subject matter.

== Background ==
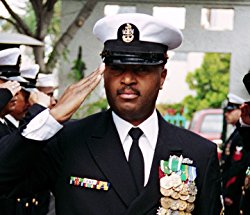
Malcolm Nance, author of The Terrorists of Iraq

Malcolm Nance is a retired U.S. Navy Senior Chief Petty Officer in naval cryptology. He garnered expertise within the fields of intelligence and counterterrorism. He served in the U.S. Navy for 20 years, from 1981 to 2001. Nance was an interpreter for Russian, and began working in the intelligence field through research into the history of the Soviet Union and its spying agency the KGB. He devoted years of research to analyzing Middle East terrorism and sovereign nations with ties to Russia. He graduated from New York's Excelsior College with a degree in Arabic. Nance took part in combat operations which occurred after the 1983 Beirut barracks bombings, was involved with the 1986 United States bombing of Libya, served on the USS Wainwright during Operation Praying Mantis and participated in the sinking of Iranian missile boat Joshan, served on the USS Tripoli during the Gulf War, and assisted during a Banja Luka, Bosnia air strike.

After retiring from military service, Nance founded a consulting company based in Georgetown, Washington, D.C. where he provided advising services to United States Special Operations Command. During the September 11 attacks, Nance personally witnessed American Airlines Flight 77 crash into The Pentagon and he assisted in rescue operations at the impact site. He created a training center called the Advanced Terrorism, Abduction and Hostage Survival School. Nance manages a think tank analyzing counterterrorism called "Terror Asymmetrics Project on Strategy, Tactics and Radical Ideologies", consisting of Central Intelligence Agency and military intelligence officers with direct prior field experience. Nance is a member of the board of directors for the International Spy Museum in Washington, D.C. Nance's books on counter-terrorism include: An End to al-Qaeda, Terrorist Recognition Handbook, The Plot to Hack America, Defeating ISIS, and Hacking ISIS.

== Summary ==
The Terrorists of Iraq traces terrorist roots of the insurgency within Iraq which yielded the development of the later terrorist group known as Islamic State of Iraq and the Levant (ISIS). Although the book was written before the New York Times 2014 front-page story detailing the actual existence of WMD in Iraq, Nance faults the decision to begin the 2003 Iraq war by the Bush administration as the impetus for subsequent chaos within the region. He notes the Iraq war was supported by a false premise, and asserts that subsequent chaos in the country was exacerbated by mismanagement from individuals including Paul Bremer, provisional leader of the country while the war was still ongoing.

Nance asserts that the United States did not adequately learn from the past mistakes of the Vietnam War and the 1920 uprising by the people of Iraq against the United Kingdom forces. He notes these events could have imparted valuable pointers to the Bush administration such as the notion that terrorism tactics used by insurgency operations including guerrilla warfare were difficult to defeat effectively, even in the face of overwhelming U.S. military forces. Nance recounts lessons learned from the Lebanon war with Israel in 1992, particularly how the subsequent occupation of Lebanon by Israel could have provided the U.S. with significant ways to improve their strategy in the Iraqi invasion in 2003. Nance compares the two occupation force strategies, and argues each left their occupiers with many deaths and few tangible results.

The book discusses the Obama administration Iranian nuclear development limitations agreement. Nance argues that it is a promising endeavor and in the best interests of Iran, as it opens the door for them to acquire the Western products they desire. Nance analyzes the diplomatic and military strategies available to the U.S. to deal with the Iran nuclear situation. He warns that war with Iran in order to potentially limit their nuclear capabilities would lead to financial ruin in America, retaliatory strikes against Israel, increased oil prices, conflict by Iran with the Arab states of the Persian Gulf, and closure of shipping lanes for oil. Nance acknowledges Iran's significant contributions to terrorism around the world, but argues that a peaceful resolution to the nuclear issue is a worthwhile endeavor.

== Release and reception ==
The book was published in 2014 by CRC Press, in a revised edition in hardcover format. CRC Press published an e-book edition the same year. The book was published in 2007 by BookSurge Publishing in a paperback format under the slightly revised title, The Terrorists of Iraq: Inside the Strategy and Tactics of the Iraq Insurgency. CRC Press released another edition in print and e-book format in 2015. Another print edition was published in 2015 by Taylor & Francis.

The book was required reading by Tufts University in a 2015 college-level course, "Iraq: A State in Flux". Christopher Hitchens wrote in an article for Vanity Fair, "The Terrorists of Iraq, is a highly potent analysis both of the jihadist threat in Mesopotamia and of the ways in which we have made its life easier." The Guardian national security reporter Spencer Ackerman said, "If you've read books like The Terrorists of Iraq and Defeating ISIS, you know Malcolm's expertise." ShadowProof journalist Matt Duss called The Terrorists of Iraq, "a detailed description of the various factions and movements ... fighting U.S. forces in Iraq."

A review of the book in the academic journal Behavioral Sciences of Terrorism and Political Aggression by Chi Zang, recommended the work as a resource for those researching the subject matter including individuals drafting legislation to address the issues involved and academics. The review in Behavioral Sciences of Terrorism and Political Aggression concluded, "This book is easy to read, vivid, and offers enormous precious experience and empirical data which make it attractive to policy-makers, scholars, and students."

The Times of Israel published a book review of The Terrorists of Iraq, by contributor Ben Rothke. Rothke wrote that The Terrorists of Iraq, "provides a deep understanding of the subject." The reviewer highly recommended the book, and wrote highly of the author's expertise in the subject matter, "For those that want to truly understand the Iraq conflict and its surrounding issues, Nance is eminently qualified and this book is uniquely superb." Rothke concluded, "There is no better book than The Terrorists of Iraq: Inside the Strategy and Tactics of the Iraq Insurgency 2003–2014 on the subject." Rothke placed the book among "The Best Information Security Books of 2015", in a post for The Security Reading Room. Rothke also wrote a favorable review of the book on the site.

== See also ==
- List of books about al-Qaeda
- Iraq War
- Islam and violence
- Islamic extremism
- Islamic fundamentalism
- Islamic terrorism
- Muslim attitudes toward terrorism
