= Reign of Terror (disambiguation) =

The Reign of Terror is a historical period during the early part of the French Revolution.

Reign of Terror may also refer to:

== Music ==
- Reign of Terror (demo), a 1984 demo album by Death
- Reign of Terror, a 2005 song by Sabaton
- Reign of Terror (Sleigh Bells album) (2012)
- Reign of Terror (Capture the Crown album) (2014)
- Reign of Terror, a 2015 EP by Terror Universal

== Other uses ==
- 1981–1982 Iran massacres, the "Reign of Terror" perpetrated by Islamists after the Iranian Revolution
- Reign of Terror (Osage) or Osage Indian murders, a series of murders in Osage County, Oklahoma from 1921 to 1925
- Reign of Terror (book)
- Reign of Terror (film), a 1949 film about the historical period
- The Reign of Terror (Doctor Who), a 1964 Doctor Who serial, which takes place during the titual event.
- Reign of Terror, an episode of the 1976 television drama I, Claudius
- Revolutionary terror, the institutionalized application of force to counterrevolutionaries
- Rains of Terror, referring to exoplanet HD 189733 b's harsh weather conditions

== See also ==
- Great Terror (disambiguation)
- Terror (disambiguation)
