= The Plot to Hack America =

Non-fiction book by Malcolm Nance

- The Plot to Hack America
- Author: Malcolm Nance; Spencer Ackerman (foreword)
- Audio read by: Gregory Itzin
- Original title: The Plot to Hack America: How Putin's Cyberspies and WikiLeaks Tried to Steal the 2016 Election
- Cover artist: Brian Peterson
- Language: English
- Subject: Russian interference in the 2016 U.S. elections
- Publisher: Skyhorse Publishing
- Publication date: October 10, 2016
- Publication place: United States
- Media type: Print
- Pages: 216
- ISBN: 978-1-5107-3468-5 (Hardcover)
- OCLC: 987592653
- Preceded by: Defeating ISIS
- Followed by: Hacking ISIS
- Website: Official website

The Plot to Hack America: How Putin's Cyberspies and WikiLeaks Tried to Steal the 2016 Election is a non-fiction book by Malcolm Nance about the Russian interference in the 2016 United States elections. It was published in paperback, audiobook, and e-book formats in 2016 by Skyhorse Publishing. A second edition was also published the same year, and a third edition in 2017. Nance researched Russian intelligence, working as a Russian interpreter and studying KGB history.

Nance described the black propaganda warfare known as active measures by RT (Russia Today) and Sputnik News. He recounts Vladimir Putin's KGB rise, and details the myriad links between Trump associates and Russian officials. Nance concludes that Putin managed the cyberattack by hacker groups Cozy Bear and Fancy Bear.

The Wall Street Journal placed the book in its list of "Best-Selling Books" for the week of February 19, 2017, at seventh place in the category "Nonfiction E-Books". New York Journal of Books called it "an essential primer for anyone wanting to be fully informed about the unprecedented events surrounding the 2016 U.S. presidential election." Napa Valley Register described Nance's work as "the best book on the subject". The Huffington Post remarked Putin had played a Game of Thrones with the election. Newsweek wrote that the problem with disinformation tactics is that by the time they are debunked, the public has already consumed the falsehoods.

== Summary ==
The book is dedicated to U.S. Army officer Humayun Khan and begins with a foreword by Spencer Ackerman. Nance details Russian interference in the 2016 U.S. elections and describes how, in March 2016, Democratic National Committee (DNC) servers were hacked by someone seeking opposition research on Donald Trump. Nance learnt of a hacker, Guccifer 2.0, who would release hacked DNC materials. Nance gives context including Trump's motivations to run for president after being made fun of at the 2011 White House Correspondents' Association Dinner, his criticism of Barack Obama, and his entry into the 2016 race for the White House.

Nance discusses black propaganda techniques used by the Russian Federation, and characterizes RT (formerly Russia Today) and Sputnik News as agencies of disinformation. He asserts that President Vladimir Putin was intimately involved in the Russian intelligence operation to elect Trump, directing the entire covert operation himself.

In "Trump's Agents, Putin's Assets", Nance delves further into links between Trump associates and Russian officials, asserting that multiple agents of Trump were assets for Putin, providing access to Trump. Nance identifies Putin's strategy for electing Trump as American president, referred to as "Operation Lucky-7: The Kremlin Plan to Elect a President", and describes this as a multitask effort involving hacking into the DNC to acquire the personal information of their members, as well as to seek out compromising material known as kompromat.

"Battles of the CYBER BEARS" describes the two hacker entities tied to Russian intelligence: Cozy Bear and Fancy Bear. Cozy Bear is believed to be linked to the Russian Federal Security Service (FSB) or Foreign Intelligence Service (SVR), while Fancy Bear is associated with Russian military intelligence agency GRU. Nance describes how Russian intelligence attempted to make their releases of leaked DNC emails appear deniable. In "WikiLeaks: Russia's Intelligence Laundromat", he likens use of the whistleblower website WikiLeaks to money laundering. Nance asserts WikiLeaks willingly collaborated in the operation. "When CYBER BEARS Attack" describes the impact of Podesta emails and DNC email leaks on the 2016 Clinton campaign.

Finally, in "Cyberwar to Defend Democracy", Nance reiterates that the U.S. was the target of cyberwarfare by Russian intelligence agencies GRU and FSB, as directly ordered by Putin. Nance writes that Russia succeeded in casting doubt of citizens in the strength of U.S. democracy. He posits that, were the U.S. populace at large to internalize future acts of cyberwarfare as dangerous attempts to subvert daily life, they could lead to actual war itself.

== Composition and publication ==
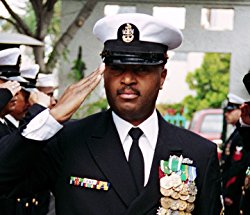
Malcolm Nance, author of The Plot to Hack America

Before beginning research for The Plot to Hack America, Nance gained counter-intelligence experience as a U.S. Navy Senior Chief Petty Officer in naval cryptology, where he served from 1981 to 2001. He garnered expertise within the fields of intelligence and counterterrorism. The author learned about Russian history as an interpreter for Russian, and began working in the intelligence field through research into the history of the Soviet Union and its spying agency the KGB. He devoted years of research to analyzing foreign relations of Russia.

Prior to analyzing the Russian interference in the 2016 U.S. elections, Nance's background in counter-intelligence analysis included management of a think tank called Terror Asymmetrics Project on Strategy, Tactics and Radical Ideologies, consisting of Central Intelligence Agency and military intelligence officers with direct prior field experience. Nance's books on counter-terrorism include An End to al-Qaeda, Terrorist Recognition Handbook, The Terrorists of Iraq, Defeating ISIS, and Hacking ISIS.

Nance began work on The Plot to Hack America incidentally, while already engaged in writing Hacking ISIS. During the course of research for Hacking ISIS, he discovered computer hacking of Germany's legislative body, the Bundestag, and French television station TV5Monde. At the time, the hacks were thought to be caused by ISIS, but instead they were traced back to Russian hacking group, the Cyber Bears. Nance knew this was a Russian intelligence GRU operated group, and realized the attribution to ISIS was a false flag operation to throw investigators off the trail. This gave Nance prior knowledge of Russian intelligence tactics, through the Cyber Bears, to infiltrate servers for purposes of disrupting government in the case of Germany, and injecting propaganda in the case of France. After the 2016 hack on the DNC, it was apparent to Nance that the identical foreign agency had carried out the attack, GRU. Nance's suspicions were borne out as accurate when security firm CrowdStrike determined Cozy Bear and Fancy Bear were behind the attack. Nance saw this as akin to the Watergate scandal, albeit a virtual attack instead of a physical break-in to Democratic facilities.

Nance told C-SPAN that for the majority of his working life he has identified as a member of the U.S. Republican Party, describing himself as being from the "Colin Powell School of Republicanism", and The Plot to Hack America was written out of a desire as an intelligence expert to document the background behind the attack by a foreign power on U.S. democratic institutions. Nance realized the gravity of the attack because he considered that such an operation must have been sanctioned and managed by former KGB officer Vladimir Putin himself. Nance is a member of the board of directors for the International Spy Museum in Washington, D.C. Through this work at the museum, Nance befriended former KGB general Oleg Kalugin, who advised him "once KGB always KGB". Nance considered that Putin's objectives would not have been simply to harm Hillary Clinton but actually to attempt to achieve the ascendancy of Donald Trump to U.S. president.

The Plot to Hack America was first published in an online format on September 23, 2016, the same day United States Intelligence Community assessments about Russian interference in the 2016 United States elections were delivered to President Barack Obama. The appendix to the book notes this timing, and points out, "Many of the conclusions that were included in the consensus opinion of the principal three intelligence agencies, the NSA, the CIA, and the FBI, are identical to The Plot to Hack America". Its first paperback format was published on October 10, 2016. A second edition was released the same year, in addition to an eBook format. Another edition was published in 2017, along with an audiobook narrated by Gregory Itzin. The author was the subject of hecklers when he appeared at an event to discuss his work at Books & Books in Miami, Florida in 2017.

== Reception ==
The book was a commercial success, and The Wall Street Journal placed The Plot to Hack America in its list of "Best-Selling Books" for the week of February 19, 2017, at 7th place in the category "NonFiction E-Books". The book was included for reading in a course on political science at Pasadena City College. In a review for the New York Journal of Books, Michael Lipkin was effusive, writing: "Malcolm Nance's The Plot to Hack America is an essential primer for anyone wanting to be fully informed about the unprecedented events surrounding the 2016 U.S. presidential election." Lipkin wrote of the author's expertise on the subject matter: "He is a patriot and a highly experienced and respected intelligence expert bringing to bear his own deep and extensive knowledge and conclusions in perhaps one of the most important developments in American history." Lawrence Swaim gave Nance's work a favorable reception, in a book review for the Napa Valley Register. He wrote, "It's a quick read, and at present easily the best book on the subject." Swaim recommended resources at the back of the book, writing, "But what's really killer about the Nance book is the appendix, which contains extremely revealing assessments made by American intelligence agencies, all presented in an unclassified format."

Kenneth J. Bernstein wrote for Daily Kos "to convince you to read this important book", he echoed the warning in its conclusion about the dangers posed by cyberwarfare. Bernstein wrote that the book's argumentation was strengthened because, "Every single assertion Nance offers is backed by material ... clearly documented in end notes". Bernstein wrote favorably in addition of the book's foreword by The Guardian editor for national security, Spencer Ackerman. Italian language newspaper La Stampa called the book "molto bello". Writing for The Independent, Andy Martin, commented, "I suppose the only weak spot in the subtitle is the word 'tried'. Surely they did more than 'try'?"

Maclean's wrote that The Plot to Hack America, "was prescient about Russia's meddling in the 2016 U.S. election." Brian Lamb, founder and retired CEO of C-SPAN, commented that the book's titled choice seemed political in nature. Strategic Finance noted "Nance focuses on a new hybrid cyber warfare, Kompromat, which uses cyber assets", as a way to attack political enemies. TechGenix journalist Michael Adams wrote that Nance provides an in-depth analysis of an issue characterized by multiple commentators as a national controversy rivalling the Watergate scandal. Adams called the book an engaging tale of espionage including context on Russian intelligence and the background of Vladimir Putin in the KGB. Voice of America commented that Nance capably "outlined his evidence" in the book about his fears of Russian foreign manipulation in the 2016 election. Bob Burnett wrote for The Huffington Post that Nance described a Game of Thrones stratagem by Vladimir Putin, using Donald Trump as a tool to embarrass Hillary Clinton and Barack Obama. Burnett observed Nance posited Trump was won over by Putin through a play to Trump's avarice and narcissism. Jeff Stein Newsweek wrote of the power of the disinformation tactics described in Nance's book: "The genius of the technique is that the correction takes days, or weeks, to catch up to the fiction. By then, gullible masses have digested the fabrications as truth."

== Aftermath ==
ODNI declassified assessment of "Russian activities and intentions in recent U.S. elections"

After The Plot to Hack America was published in October 2016, Nance was interviewed in April 2017 on C-SPAN about his book, and the impact of media operations on American society. He argued that Russia Today's actions back up the notion that black propaganda operations are effective, referencing their impact on disinformation operations. Nance cited research by the Senate Intelligence Committee, House Intelligence Committee, and Director of National Intelligence on Russia Today's methods of publishing propaganda by propagating fake news. He traced a larger problem of echo chambers, wherein a false invented story by Sputnik News traveled through bloggers to Breitbart News, became believed as factual by Trump Administration officials, and then were eventually re-reported on again by Russia Today, falsely stating they were simply reporting events created by the White House itself.

The author recalled to C-SPAN the days of the Soviet Union where the Soviet intelligence operation practice was to infiltrate and manage reporting agencies of the Communist Party in addition to political figures from both the right and left perspectives, in order to denigrate U.S. democratic interests. Nance warned that Russia under control of Vladimir Putin was motivated by the identical initiative, armed with greater tools and funding than the Soviet Union of the past. He lamented that prior to Putin's appointment as Prime Minister of Russia by Boris Yeltsin, the country was taking steps towards democracy. Nance traced Putin's rise with the descent of democracy in Russia in favor of an oligarchy ruling class of wealthy individuals managing an autocratic society. Nance said U.S. citizens become agents of Russia through employ of Russia Today due to naïveté about the nature of Russian propaganda operations geared to harm U.S. values of civil liberties.

Nance placed utilization of propaganda by Russian intelligence agencies through Russia Today and other outlets including social media as part of a larger effort at global cyberwarfare. He characterized this a form of hybrid warfare blending traditional propaganda with computer tools and subversion of media organizations. As a case study he cited Aleksandr Dugin, a Russian neofascist political activist with views favored by Putin, whose tweets expound perspectives that U.S. democratic institutions were not successful.

== See also ==
- The Case for Impeachment
- Dezinformatsia: Active Measures in Soviet Strategy
- Disinformation
- Steele dossier
- The KGB and Soviet Disinformation
- Timeline of Russian interference in the 2016 United States elections and Timeline of Russian interference in the 2016 United States elections (July 2016–election day)
- Trump: The Kremlin Candidate?
