= An End to al-Qaeda =

Book by Malcolm Nance

An to al-Qaeda
- An End to al-Qaeda
- Author: Malcolm Nance
- Audio read by: Arthur Morey
- Original title: An End to al-Qaeda: Destroying Bin Laden's Jihad and Restoring America's Honor
- Language: English
- Subject: Al-Qaeda
- Genre: Counterterrorism
- Publisher: St. Martin's Press
- Publication date: February 16, 2010
- Publication place: United States
- Media type: Hardcover
- Pages: 304
- ISBN: 978-0312592493
- OCLC: 428027220
- Preceded by: The Terrorists of Iraq
- Followed by: Defeating ISIS
- Website: Official website

An End to al-Qaeda: Destroying Bin Laden's Jihad and Restoring America's Honor is a non-fiction book about counterterrorism strategies towards al-Qaeda, written by U.S. Navy retired cryptology analyst Malcolm Nance. The book describes how the September 11 attacks changed the traditional Muslim community around the globe. Nance criticizes the approach of the George W. Bush administration, including the verbiage and public presentations used in the war on terror. The author argues al-Qaeda is not part of Islam but is instead a dangerous religious cult. Nance writes the United States should commit to better education with a public relations campaign to encourage traditional believers in Islam around the world to denounce al-Qaeda.

Nance's work received a favorable book review from Journal of Strategic Security, which recommended it for new counterterrorism analysts, including those "developing their understanding of information operations and understanding the role of religion in the battle". ShadowProof praised the author's expertise in the subject matter of counterterrorism, observing Nance sharply criticized the manner in which the United States was losing the psychological warfare battle against al-Qaeda. The work received a critical book review from Publishers Weekly, which called it a "polemic". Additionally, a book review by Kirkus Reviews criticized it for "repetition and vitriol".

== Background ==
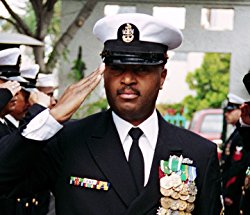
Malcolm Nance, author of An End to al-Qaeda

Malcolm Nance is a retired U.S. Navy Senior Chief Petty Officer in naval cryptology. He garnered expertise within the fields of intelligence and counterterrorism. He served in the U.S. Navy for 20 years, from 1981 to 2001. Nance was an interpreter for Russian, and began working in the intelligence field through research into the history of the Soviet Union and its spying agency, the KGB. He devoted years of research to analyzing Middle East terrorism and sovereign nations with ties to Russia. He graduated from New York's Excelsior College with a degree in Arabic. Nance took part in combat operations which occurred after the 1983 Beirut barracks bombings, was involved with the 1986 United States bombing of Libya, served on the USS Wainwright during Operation Praying Mantis and participated in the sinking of Iranian missile boat Joshan, served on the USS Tripoli during the Gulf War, and assisted during a Banja Luka, Bosnia air strike.

After retiring from military service, Nance founded a consulting company based in Georgetown, Washington, D.C. where he provided advising services to United States Special Operations Command. During the September 11 attacks, Nance personally witnessed American Airlines Flight 77 crash into The Pentagon and he assisted in rescue operations at the impact site. He created a training center called the Advanced Terrorism, Abduction and Hostage Survival School. Nance manages a think tank analyzing counterterrorism called "Terror Asymmetrics Project on Strategy, Tactics and Radical Ideologies", consisting of Central Intelligence Agency and military intelligence officers with direct prior field experience. Nance is a member of the board of directors for the International Spy Museum in Washington, D.C. Nance's books on counter-terrorism include: The Terrorists of Iraq, Terrorist Recognition Handbook, The Plot to Hack America, Defeating ISIS, and Hacking ISIS.

== Summary ==
An End to al-Qaeda describes how Nance believes al-Qaeda and Osama bin Laden can be defeated. Nance argues that al-Qaeda's true objective is to conquer Muslims and bring them to their extremist ideology, and that al-Qaeda wishes to bring Muslims into an extremist global kingdom not seen since before the time of Kemal Atatürk of Turkey. According to Nance, al-Qaeda wishes to revert Muslim society further back in time than Atatürk, to a version of culture at a time before 12-century Muslim history; the group believes Islam was perverted subsequent to interactions with the Mongol Empire and the Crusades.

The author asserts the United States government must attempt to break the ties between the traditional Islamic population and the extremism offered by al-Qaeda, so that al-Qaeda's source of human resources and influence will be removed. According to Nance, al-Qaeda is attempting to capitalize on decreasing United States influence within the region, and utilize information technology to spread its message.

An End to al-Qaeda grounds the reader within a background of how the Muslim people globally have greatly changed subsequent to the September 11 attacks. Nance is critical of the public presentation of the war on terror declared by the George W. Bush administration. He asserts the Muslim people have a wide range of spiritual practices, and it should be the goal of the United States to appeal to their humanistic values. Nance describes al-Qaeda's psychological warfare towards the United States as only enhanced if the U.S. continues to frame the battle as a war against Islam.

The book characterizes al-Qaeda not as an offshoot of Islam but as a destructive religious cult. Nance suggests American federal officials create a position to coordinate actions against al-Qaeda, put together academic gatherings to discuss the matter, and use public relations to counter extremist ideology. Nance praises Barack Obama's oratorical skills, and characterizes the president as a formidable public relations tool to use in achieving these objectives. He emphasizes traditional Muslim people share the same goals and aspirations for their families as U.S. citizens.

Nance puts forth specific suggestions on how to turn the tide against al-Qaeda's psychological warfare strategies. He backs up his thesis with case studies from his past expertise garnered as an intelligence officer fluent in the Arabic language. There is great emphasis on how much difference can be made by taking great care to use specific verbiage in communication with the Muslim community. Nance calls for a cultural widespread climate of denouncement of al-Qaeda by the Muslim community, through educating believers in Islam about the harms of al-Qaeda's goals to create an extremist Islamic empire.

== Release and reception ==
The book was first published in hardcover format in 2010 by St. Martin's Press. Its first printing was for 100,000 copies. The work was released in audiobook format in 2010 and 2015. St. Martin's Press released an e-book edition in 2013.

Journal of Strategic Security published a book review of Nance's work written by Keely M. Fahoum of Henley-Putnam University. Fahoum wrote, "An End to Al-Qaeda presents a thought-provoking discussion about Al-Qaeda (AQ), its leadership, intentions, and attempts to recruit members in the ideological battlefield." The review noted Nance's expertise in the subject matter, "The book draws on the author's expertise as a counterterrorism (CT) officer and Arabic linguist, and his experience studying AQ in the field, including in combat." Fahoum concluded, "An End to Al-Qaeda is a good read for those analysts in the CT community still developing their understanding of information operations and understanding the role of religion in the battle between AQ and the rest of the world's Muslims".

ShadowProof journalist Matt Duss pointed out Nance's expertise in the subject matter, "Few Americans can claim the knowledge of radical terrorist ideologies that Malcolm Nance can." He wrote that An End to al-Qaeda, "describes the nature and extent of the Al Qaeda threat, and suggests that the key to ending Al Qaeda is to vigorously challenge them in the realm of ideology." Duss observed, "Nance goes ... hard at the incompetence with which the U.S. has thus far waged the ideological battle against Al Qaeda."

Publishers Weekly gave the work a negative review, writing: "Intelligence veteran Nance offers a problematic prescription for defeating al-Qaeda in this disappointing polemic." The review criticized the writing style, calling it, "melodramatic", "preachy", and "pedantic". Kirkus Reviews was critical of the way Nance presented his arguments in the book, concluding, "An often cogent argument weakened by unnecessary repetition and vitriol—reads like a hybrid of a counterinsurgency manual and a consultant's business plan."

== See also ==
- Iraq War
- Islamic extremism
- Islamic fundamentalism
- Islamic terrorism
- War in Afghanistan (2001–present)
