= Terrorist Recognition Handbook =

Book by Malcolm Nance

- First edition
- Author: Malcolm Nance
- Original title: Terrorist Recognition Handbook: A Practitioner's Manual for Predicting and Identifying Terrorist Activities
- Language: English
- Subject: Counterterrorism
- Genre: Warfare
- Publisher: The Lyons Press
- Publication date: 2003
- Publication place: United States
- Media type: Paperback
- Pages: 439
- ISBN: 978-1466554573
- OCLC: 777603223
- Preceded by: An End to al-Qaeda
- Followed by: The Terrorists of Iraq
- Website: Official website

Terrorist Recognition Handbook: A Practitioner's Manual for Predicting and Identifying Terrorist Activities is a non-fiction book about counterterrorism strategies, written by U.S. Navy retired cryptology analyst Malcolm Nance. The book is intended to help law enforcement and intelligence officials with the professional practice of behavior analysis and criminal psychology of anticipating potential terrorists before they commit criminal acts. Nance draws from the field of traditional criminal analysis to posit that detecting domestic criminals is similar to determining which individuals are likely to commit acts of terrorism. The book provides resources for the law enforcement official including descriptions of devices used for possible bombs, a database of terrorist networks, and a list of references used. Nance gives the reader background on Al-Qaeda tactics, clandestine cell systems and sleeper agents, and terrorist communication methods.

Terrorist Recognition Handbook received two separate book reviews in the academic journal Perspectives on Terrorism. The journal placed the book on its "Top 150 Books on Terrorism and Counterterrorism". Its second review of the book wrote that the Terrorist Recognition Handbook "provides a comprehensive and detailed treatment of terrorism and counter-terrorism." A review published by RSA Conference called it "required reading", and "a must-read for anyone tasked with or interested in anti-terrorism activities." Midwest Book Review rated it "highly recommended for those in charge of security and community library military collections."

== Background ==
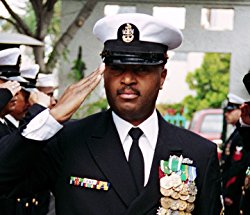
Malcolm Nance, author of Terrorist Recognition Handbook

Malcolm Nance is a retired U.S. Navy Senior Chief Petty Officer in naval cryptology. He garnered expertise within the fields of intelligence and counterterrorism. He served in the U.S. Navy for 20 years, from 1981 to 2001. Nance was an interpreter for Russian, and began working in the intelligence field through research into the history of the Soviet Union and its spying agency the KGB. He devoted years of research to analyzing Middle East terrorism and sovereign nations with ties to Russia. He graduated from New York's Excelsior College with a degree in Arabic. Nance took part in combat operations which occurred after the 1983 Beirut barracks bombings, was involved with the 1986 United States bombing of Libya, served on USS Wainwright during Operation Praying Mantis and participated in the sinking of Iranian missile boat Joshan, served on USS Tripoli during the Gulf War, and assisted during a Banja Luka, Bosnia air strike.

After retiring from military service, Nance founded a consulting company based in Georgetown, Washington, D.C. where he provided advising services to United States Special Operations Command. During the September 11 attacks, Nance personally witnessed American Airlines Flight 77 crash into The Pentagon and he assisted in rescue operations at the impact site. He created a training center called the Advanced Terrorism, Abduction and Hostage Survival School. Nance manages a think tank analyzing counterterrorism called "Terror Asymmetrics Project on Strategy, Tactics and Radical Ideologies", consisting of Central Intelligence Agency and military intelligence officers with direct prior field experience. Nance is a member of the board of directors for the International Spy Museum in Washington, D.C. Nance's books on counter-terrorism include: The Terrorists of Iraq, An End to al-Qaeda, The Plot to Hack America, Defeating ISIS, and Hacking ISIS.

== Summary ==
The book serves as a manual for counter-terrorism and law enforcement officials to prevent terrorist attacks. It is organized into six sections, covering topics including the motivations and methods of terrorists, warning signs of terrorism, intelligence collection management strategies, post-attack mitigation measures, and weapons used by terrorists, including weapons of mass destruction. Appendix resources include indexes of explosive materials and terrorist groups.

Nance discusses suicide bombers, noting that it is crucial to understand their extremist religious views in order to anticipate their attacks. Nance also covers the modus operandi of terrorist cells which are a key component of terror operations. His analysis includes the different types of cells, as well as their common tactics, communication and recruitment methods.

The book provides background on worldwide extremism ideologies and the operations of al-Qaeda across the world. It explains how al-Qaeda categorizes their targets as "Near Enemies" or "Far Enemies". The former group includes federal bureaucracies in India, Bangladesh, Egypt, and Saudi Arabia. The latter includes Israel, Europe, Australia, and the United States.

Nance emphasizes the splintered nature of al-Qaeda, which operates as a collective of smaller groups inspired by Osama bin Laden, with the Internet serving as a central organizing hub. He observes that where al-Qaeda had previously functioned as a set of terrorist entities, it shaped its operations to become more business-like, serving to disseminate information, motivate members, and provide economic funding for terrorist operations.

== Release and reception ==
The book was first published in 2003. Its third edition was published in 2013 by CRC Press. An e-book edition was released the same year. CRC Press published another release of the third edition of the book, both in print and e-book formats.

Nance's work received a book review from Midwest Book Review, which wrote: "Terrorist Recognition Handbook offers an examination of common and uncommon terrorist tactics – and how to identify an attack before it happens." The review concluded, "Terrorist Recognition Handbook: A Practitioner's Manual for Predicting and Identifying Terrorist Activities is highly recommended for those in charge of security and community library military collections."

Terrorist Recognition Handbook received two separate book reviews in the academic journal Perspectives on Terrorism. The journal placed the book on its "Top 150 Books on Terrorism and Counterterrorism". Joshua Sinai wrote for Perspectives on Terrorism, "Written by a 20-year veteran of the U.S. intelligence community, this book provides an assessment of terrorists' motivations and methods, including a listing of pre-incident indicators of potential terrorist activity, and the methodologies required to organize such information into actionable intelligence for effective response measures." Sinai wrote of the resources contained within the monograph, "The information is explained through numerous illustrations, including explanations of the types of conventional weapons and weapons of mass destruction that might be used by terrorists." In his second review of the book for Perspectives on Terrorism, Sinai wrote that the book, "provides a comprehensive and detailed treatment of terrorism and counter-terrorism."

Ben Rothke reviewed the book for RSA Conference, and called it "required reading". Rothke praised the author's expertise and writing style, "Terrorist Recognition Handbook: A Practitioner's Manual for Predicting and Identifying Terrorist Activities, is unique in that author Malcolm Nance is a 20-year veteran of the U.S. intelligence community and writes from a first hand-perspective, but with the organization and methodology of writers such as Pipes and Emerson. Those combined traits make the book extraordinarily valuable and perhaps the definitive text on terrorist recognition." Rothke's review concluded, "The Terrorist Recognition Handbook is a must-read for anyone tasked with or interested in anti-terrorism activities. One would hope that every TSA and Homeland Security manager and employee get a copy of this monumental reference."

== See also ==
- List of books about al-Qaeda
- Islamic extremism
- Islamic fundamentalism
- Islamic terrorism
- Muslim attitudes toward terrorism
