= National American University =

Private for-profit online university

- Motto: Quality higher education in a caring and supportive environment.
- Type: Private for-profit online university
- Established: 1941; 85 years ago
- President: Cindy Mathena
- Location: Rapid City, South Dakota, United States
- Colors: Navy and Red
- Website: www.national.edu

National American University (NAU) is a private for-profit online university headquartered in Rapid City, South Dakota. It is owned by National American University Holdings, Inc. (NAUH). In 2018, NAU acquired the assets of Henley-Putnam University and now offers strategic security programs. Most of NAU's academic programs are on the 11-week quarter system and have monthly starts. The university is accredited by the Higher Learning Commission.

== History ==
Founded in 1941 as "National School of Business" by Clarence and Katherine Jacobson, the school began as a one-year secretarial school. In 1962, Harold D. Buckingham acquired the school and soon after changed the name to National College of Business. The school would change names again to National College of Business (NCB) as they expanded course offerings beyond business programs. Soon after NCB would gain accreditation from the Accrediting Commission of Association of Independent Colleges first as a junior college in 1966 and then as a senior college in 1970 offering both associate and bachelor’s degree programs.

Throughout the next decade, NCB would open several campuses through the Midwest and Rocky Mountain regions.

In 1980, NCB again expanded its course offerings – this time beyond business programs – which led to another name change: National College. As part of the name change, the school also began the accreditation process with the Higher Learning Commission. National College earned full accreditation in 1985 and continues to maintain their accreditation with their most recent reaffirmation of accreditation occurring during the 2024-2025 school year. The most recent accreditation is under their current name: National American University, which the school adopted in 1997.

In 1998 National American University began offering online courses and degree options for students across the United States and internationally. Online programs include associate's, bachelor's, master's and doctoral degrees in areas such as accounting, business, information technology, strategic security, and health care. Students are also provided access to classes and extensive campus resources including learning resource center services, tutoring services, counseling services, and computer support through a student portal.

In the early 2000's, NAU introduced the "One" program, where students could register with full-time status while only taking classes one day or night weekly.

In 2012, 53% of NAU's students were studying online, with an additional 17% taking some classes online. In 2018, 77% of NAU's students were studying online, with an additional 12% taking some classes online.

=== Financial issues and retrenchment ===
In 2018, NAUH mortgaged real property to secure an $8 million loan which was subsequently paid in full. Campus closings were planned as NAU transitioned to an online university and the NAUH agreed to voluntarily delist from the NASDAQ.

The following year, NAUH announced that "the Company had $0.5 million of unrestricted cash and cash equivalents and a working capital deficiency of $8.7 million. These factors, among others, raise substantial doubt regarding the Company’s ability to continue as a going concern." On February 15, 2019, NAUH announced Thomas Bickart as their new chief financial officer. Bickart was CFO at TCI College of Technology from 2013 to 2016 and later worked at EdisonLearning, Inc. to restructure its operations. In March, the university announced that most of its 24 ground campuses would be closed, except for Ellsworth Air Force Base and King's Bay Naval Submarine Base.

On April 15, 2019, National American University reported that they must post a letter of credit for either 50% ($36.7 million) or 15% ($11 million) of its Title IV awards to continue participating in the program. It faced further pressure with an $800,000 debt payment due the following month and an ongoing federal False Claims lawsuit. The school has since resolved its debts and the letter of credit has been significantly reduced.

NAU's students were surprised that the campuses were closing.

National American University received $1,453,446 under the first round of the 2020 CARES Act, $390,269 under the second round of the Covid Relief Bill, and $207,146 under the 2021 American Rescue Plan.

In October 2021, Minnesota Office Plaza filed a lawsuit against NAUH, claiming that NAUH hid assets to avoid paying $2.3 million in back and future rent. The lawsuit was resolved and a Judgement of Dismissal was filed in September 2023.

In January 2022, NAUH reported $8.2 million in assets, $15.9 million in liabilities, and less than $400,000 in cash. In April 2022, NAUH reported less than $50,000 in cash.

In October 2023, NAUH reported no available cash. NAUH reported cash on hand in their Quarterly Report for quarter ending August 31, 2025. The school is currently on Heightened Cash Monitoring by the US Department of Education.

== Academics ==
=== Programs ===
National American University is organized into four academic divisions:

- College of Undergraduate Studies
- Henley-Putnam School of Strategic Security
- Harold D. Buckingham Graduate School
- College of Legal Studies

The university offers certificates, associate, bachelor's, master's, and doctoral degrees in fields including business administration, management, accounting, information technology, construction management, aviation management, healthcare management, criminal justice, strategic security, intelligence management, and legal studies. Academic programs are offered primarily online.

In addition to its degree programs, the university offers non-credit, self-paced professional training and certificate programs through its Upskill Academy, covering fields such as information technology, healthcare, business, and skilled trades.

In August 2008, the university's graduate studies division was renamed the Harold D. Buckingham Graduate School in honor of the institution's late owner. Graduate programs include the Master of Business Administration (MBA), Master of Management (MM), and Doctor of Education (EdD). The Henley-Putnam School of Strategic Security offers undergraduate and graduate programs in criminal justice, intelligence management, strategic security and protection management, and terrorism and counterterrorism studies, including the Doctor of Strategic Security (DSS).

In 2024, the university introduced Credentials of Graduate Studies (COGS) within its MBA and Master of Management programs. The credentials are awarded upon completion of designated groups of graduate courses, allowing students to earn intermediate academic credentials while progressing toward their master's degrees.

In 2025, the Higher Learning Commission approved the university's Bachelor of Science in Information Technology – FOCUSED, a reduced-credit bachelor's degree requiring 135 quarter credits rather than the traditional 180 quarter credits.

In August 2026, the Higher Learning Commission approved three additional reduced-credit bachelor's degree programs: the Bachelor of Science in Management – FOCUSED, offered through the College of Undergraduate Studies, and the Bachelor of Science in Criminal Justice – FOCUSED and Bachelor of Science in Strategic Security and Protection Management – FOCUSED, offered through the Henley-Putnam School of Strategic Security. Each program requires 135 quarter credits, equivalent to approximately 30 courses, and is designed for completion in approximately three years of full-time study.

In 2026, the university also revised its Doctor of Education program following approval from the Higher Learning Commission. The redesign converted the program from semester credits to quarter credits, established a 90-quarter-credit curriculum, and introduced an alternative to the traditional dissertation through an applied Problem of Practice culminating in a Practice Educator Portfolio.

=== Faculty ===
According to the College Navigator, National American University has 2 full-time instructors and 134 part-time instructors, and the student-to-faculty ratio is 6 to 1.

=== Enrollment ===
Total student enrollment has declined from 9,519 students in 2015 to 3,398 students in February 2019. In March 2019, National American University announced that it was closing most of its remaining 24 physical locations, including campuses in Rapid City and Sioux Falls. and is now an online university. The College Navigator reports NAU's total enrollment at 1,610 students.

=== Student outcomes ===
In 2026, the U.S. Department of Education data on graduation rates that described first-time, full-time students showed that NAU enrolled almost exclusively part-time students who previously attended college and therefore college graduation rates were reported as 0% for the cohort beginning in the fall of 2018; this indicated that there were no first-time, full-time students enrolled who progressed to graduation. Salary after completing averaged $53,841. Two years after completion, student loan debt borrowers were 31% in forbearance, 26% not making progress, 17% defaulted, 9% in deferment, 8% delinquent, 5% making progress, 2% discharged, and 1% paid in full.

=== Accreditation ===
NAU is accredited by the Higher Learning Commission. Several NAU programs are separately accredited or approved by multiple national, educational and professional associations, including:

- International Accreditation Council for Business Education (IACBE)
- American Bar Association (ABA)

== Locations ==
=== Remaining locations ===
- Online (1,151 students)

=== Closed campuses ===
Colorado

- Centennial (Denver Metro)
- Colorado Springs (North)
- Colorado Springs (South)

Indiana

- Indianapolis

Kansas

- Garden City
- Overland Park
- Wichita (East)
- Wichita (West)

Minnesota

- Bloomington
- Brooklyn Center
- Burnsville
- Rochester
- Roseville

Missouri

- Independence
- Lee's Summit
- Zona Rosa (Kansas City)

Nebraska

- Bellevue

New Mexico

- Albuquerque (East)
- Albuquerque (West)

Oklahoma

- Tulsa

South Carolina

- Charleston (Joint Base Charleston)

South Dakota

- Ellsworth Air Force Base
- Rapid City
- Sioux Falls
- Watertown

Texas

- Austin
- Georgetown
- Houston
- Killeen
- Lewisville
- Mesquite
- Richardson

== National American University Holdings, Inc. ==
National American University Holdings, Inc., was a publicly traded corporation (NASDAQ: NAUH) holding company for NAU and other assets. The corporation is located in Rapid City, South Dakota. National American University Holdings, Inc. is now an "Over The Counter" traded company listed on the OTCQB since January 2019.
