= And Then All Hell Broke Loose =

2016 non-fiction work by Richard Engel

And Then All Hell Broke Loose: Two Decades in the Middle East
- First edition
- Author: Richard Engel
- Subject: War on terror
- Genre: non-fiction
- Publisher: Simon & Schuster
- Publication date: 2016
- Pages: 241 pages
- ISBN: 978-1-4516-3511-9
- OCLC: 918762663
- LC Class: DS39.3 .E54 2016

And Then All Hell Broke Loose: Two Decades in the Middle East is a book written by Richard Engel about his journey in the Middle East as a freelance reporter. The book gives account of the terrorist activities and numerous wars in the region. His journey includes reporting in Egypt, Iraq, and Lebanon.

== About the author ==
Richard Engel is an American journalist who was born in New York. He grew up in Manhattan, where he attended Riverdale Country School. After graduating, he went on to attend Stanford University and earned a B.A. in foreign relations. He knew he wanted to be a journalist and decided to move to the middle east, because he knew that's where the next big story would be. He began as a freelance reporter working for many news agencies such as ABC, USA Today, and BBC World Service. He lived in Egypt, Iraq, and Syria so he could get the first hand accounts of any news or events. He is one of very few reporters and the only American television correspondent to cover the entire war in Iraq. He also covered the war in Afghanistan, and the revolution in Libya. He can speak many dialects of Arabic and also Spanish and Italian. Over his long career, he has survived IED attacks, kidnappings, and ambushes, He was named chief foreign correspondent for NBC news in 2008 and has won seven news and documentary Emmys. He is now the author of three books.

== Synopsis ==
Richard Engel begins talking about graduating from Stanford and wanting to become a reporter but not your typical reporter, he wanted to focus on something more than the stock market so he moved to the middle east in 1996, when people like Saddam Hussein, Gadhafi, and Mubarak were the big leaders. At this time under the big men the middle east was angry, oppressed and rotten to the core. He lived in Cairo where he talks about how different it is from the US such as having no privacy and not speaking to a woman for two years. Engel talks about how everything in the media was heavily censored when he worked for the Middle East Times. The first attack he saw was a bus shooting and burning in Tahrir Square one of the busiest parts of downtown Cairo, he saw people shot and melted into their bus seats. He counts this and the attack in Luxor the first Al-Qaeda-style attacks. He talks about Islam and its origins- Islam's message- all men are equal in prayer, humbled together in communal submission, rich and poor side by side. Mohammad asked for 5 daily prayers, a weekly gathering with a short sermon, partial fasting for a month each year, and a once-in-a-lifetime pilgrimage to Mecca, called the hajj, for those who could afford it. After World War I and the treaties and promises made by Europeans it left the middle east hopelessly divided. After World War II the US pretty much was the Middle East's guardian of stability. After 9/11 when Bush said he was launching a crusade many Muslims took that at face value. Engel started freelancing in 1998 for ABC, The World, and other news organizations. The hardcore Egyptian jihadists joined the holy wars in Afghanistan against the soviets then would return and get put in jail and murdered so they ran to the mountains where they would live and later form standing armies one of which is AL-Qaeda.

Richard Engel started his foreign corresponding in Egypt, which he describes in the first chapter. Starting in the second chapter, Engel realizes that the good reporting will be moving around the middle east, with the next stop being Israel. Engel lived in Jerusalem and started to make a name for himself with his big international stories. These stories were mostly based on the relations between the Israelis and Palestinians, which were governed by the Oslo II Accord, splitting the Palestinian land into three areas with different governing power given to the Israelis. The Palestinians predilection towards violence and suicide bombings led to the second intifada. The conflict ended when the leader of the Palestinians, Yasser Arafat, was captured, and Israel went into the Palestine area with Operation Defensive Shield and captured almost all the cities. Soon after, the events on September 11, 2001, made it clear to Engel that the best reporting would now be in Iraq. Engel covered Iraq for 3 years, slowly gaining friends on the inside that could help him and enemies that would come after all reporters. The conflict here was between Sunni and Shiite Muslims. Saddam Hussein was the leader of the Sunnis and the leader of Iraq, and Engel had to endure countless sleepless nights because of the bombs that went off everywhere around the country. The Sunnis were the majority, but the US backed the Shiites and pushed for democracy after they took down Saddam Hussein. But, after Hussein was taken, it brought out the rotten core and extremists of the Sunnis, including Abu Musab al-Zarqawi. Engel credits him to the start of ISIS, including the first beheading video of Nick Berg, an American freelance construction contractor. After many attacks by Zarqawi and his group, who strived to be like Osama bin Laden and al-Qaeda, Zarqawi was killed by US special forces. Engel's next home would be Iran.
