= Richard Engel =

American journalist and author

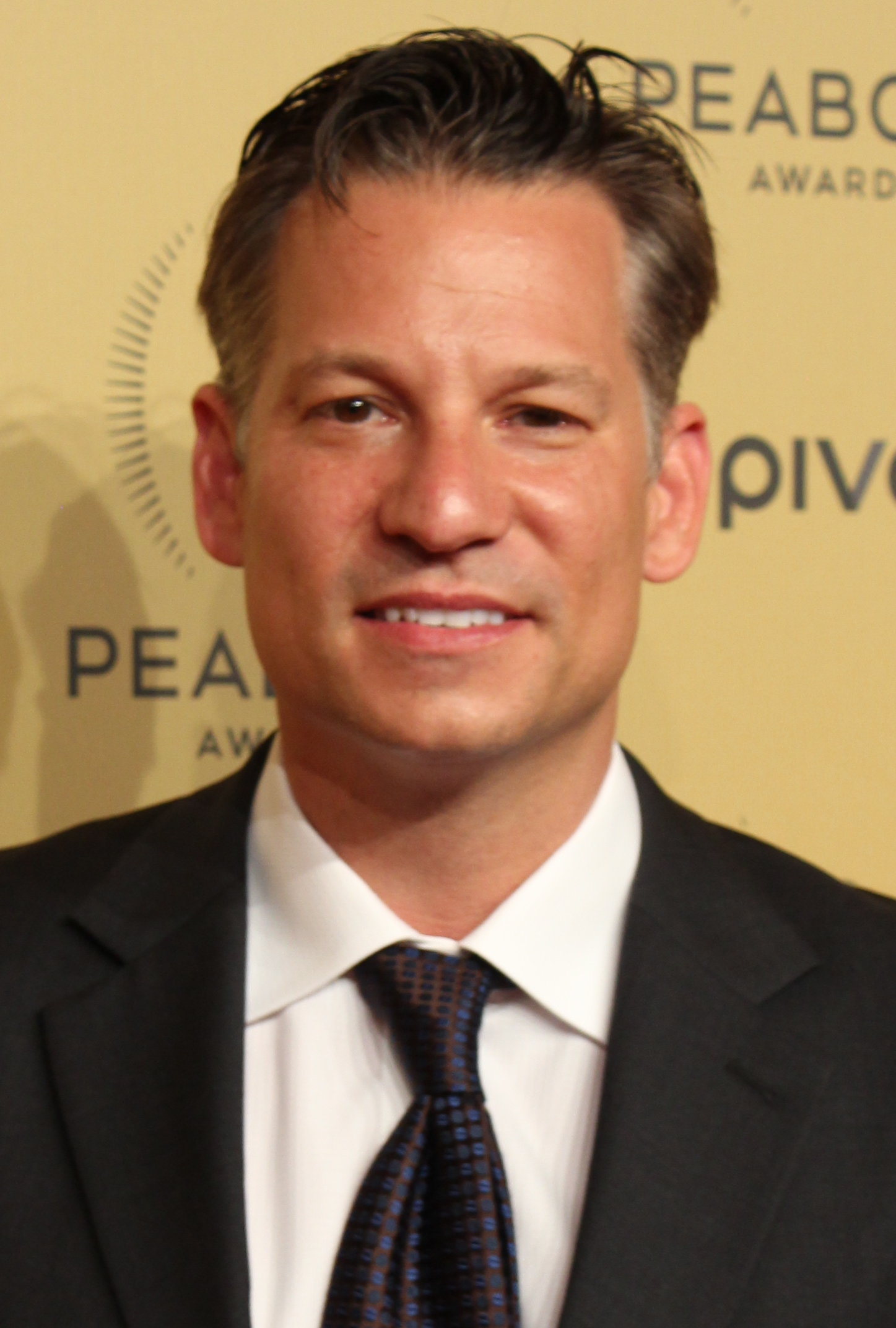
- At the 2015 Peabody Awards ceremony
- Born: New York City, U.S.
- Education: Stanford University (BA)
- Occupation: Television journalist
- Title: Chief foreign correspondent for NBC News (2008–present)
- Spouse: Mary Forrest (m. 2015)
- Children: 2 (1 deceased)

Richard Engel is an American journalist and author who is the chief foreign correspondent for NBC News. He was assigned to that position on April 18, 2008, after serving as the network's Middle East correspondent and Beirut bureau chief. Before joining NBC in May 2003, Engel reported on the start of the 2003 war in Iraq for ABC News as a freelance journalist in Baghdad.

Engel is known for having covered the Iraq War, the Arab Spring and the Syrian Civil War. He speaks and reads Arabic fluently and is fluent in Italian and Spanish. Engel received the Medill Medal for Courage in Journalism for his report "War Zone Diary".

Engel wrote A Fist in the Hornet's Nest, published in 2004, about his experience covering the Iraq War from Baghdad. His most recent book, And Then All Hell Broke Loose, published in 2016, is about his two-decade career in the Middle East as a freelance reporter.

== Early years ==
Engel grew up on the Upper East Side of Manhattan, New York City. His older brother, David, is a cardiologist at New York–Presbyterian Hospital. His father Peter, a former Goldman Sachs financier, and mother Nina, who ran an antiques store, feared for their son's future prospects because of his dyslexia. His father is Jewish, and his mother is Swedish.

Engel attended the Riverdale Country School, a highly competitive college-prep school in New York City, where at first he struggled with his schoolwork and progress. At age 13, he joined a wilderness survival camp where he learned about leadership and how to be more independent. His schoolwork began to improve and he started to gain popularity with his peers. He then spent his junior year of high school in Italy and became fluent in Italian. Engel began to appreciate the difference in cultures and countries that influenced his future career choices.

He later went to Stanford University, where he occasionally wrote for The Stanford Daily. Engel spent one summer as an unpaid intern at CNN Business News in New York City. He graduated from Stanford in 1996 with a B.A. in international relations.

== Broadcasting career ==
After graduating from Stanford, Engel left for Cairo, feeling the region was where the next big story would erupt. He attributed his attraction to journalism as "the prospect of learning about new subjects and having the privilege of riding the train of history rather than watching it pass". He first lived in a ramshackle seven-story walk-up, learned Egyptian Arabic and worked as a freelance reporter in Cairo for four years.

Engel worked as the Middle East correspondent for The World, a joint production of BBC World Service, Public Radio International (PRI) and WGBH from 2001 to 2003. He also reported for USA Today, Reuters, AFP and Jane's Defence Weekly. Engel worked for ABC News as a freelance journalist during the initial invasion of Iraq by U.S. forces. Engel continued his coverage of the Iraq war in Baghdad as NBC's primary Iraq correspondent.

In May 2006, he assumed his role as senior Middle East correspondent and Beirut bureau chief. During this time he covered the war between Israel and Hezbollah in Lebanon. He filed a number of reports from Lebanon during the 2006 Lebanon War.

In April 2008, Engel became Chief Foreign Correspondent of NBC News. In May 2008, he interviewed U.S. President George W. Bush, largely about his speech to the Israeli Knesset. The interview also focused on Iran's empowerment as a result of the war in Iraq and how to counteract Iran's influence in the region.

In 2009, Engel was stationed in Kabul, Afghanistan, covering the country's August presidential election.

In 2011, Engel reported, at times through tear gas, on the Egyptian revolution. He also covered the Libyan Civil War, where he was nearly shot in Benghazi. The same year he toured and reported on the city of Mogadishu, Somalia, for a segment titled "The World's Most Dangerous City", for which he would receive a News and Documentary Emmy Award nomination.

Engel reported on the Israel-Gaza conflict of 2012, the continued violence stemming from the revolution in Syria and its consequent civil war, and the political transition of Egypt following the election of President Mohamed Morsi in June 2012.

Engel is the host of the MSNBC special series On Assignment with Richard Engel, which won a 2019 Peabody Award. Engel's latest documentary, Ukraine: Freedom or Death aired on April 22, 2022, and covered the first two months of the 2022 Russian invasion of Ukraine.

=== Iraq War ===
While many media outlets pulled their journalists out of Iraq shortly after shelling began in March 2003, Engel stayed, and was subsequently one of the only Western journalists in the country. He was the only American television correspondent to remain in Baghdad for the entire war. Engel covered all major milestones of the war, including the first free Iraqi election and the capture, trial, and execution of Saddam Hussein. Engel reported on events from different perspectives by gaining and maintaining frequent access to U.S. military commanders, Sunni insurgents, Shiite militias, and Iraqi families. He frequently traveled outside Iraq's Green Zone, the fortified international zone in central Baghdad, to report on the genuine state of Iraqi life.

At times, Engel said he found himself "dressed as a blue target" as a foreign journalist in Iraq. He survived kidnapping attempts, bombings, IED attacks, and ambushes. He spent years covering what he often describes as one of the most important stories of his generation, the Iraq War. He explains the conflict as occurring in six stages, or as six separate wars:

1. Shock and Awe, the U.S. invasion of Iraq
2. Nation-building
3. Insurgency
4. Civil war
5. U.S. troop surge, the influx of 30,000 troops in 2007
6. Iraq exit strategy

Engel received a request from the Bush administration to meet with President George W. Bush at the White House to discuss Iraq and Mideast policy. Engel and Bush met privately in February 2007. In 2008, Engel interviewed U.S. Army General David Petraeus on the progress of the Iraq War and discussed the policies the general attributed to the recent successes in Iraq. Engel's award-winning documentary, War Zone Diary, chronicled the everyday realities of covering the war in Iraq.

=== War in Afghanistan ===
Engel frequently traveled to Afghanistan to report on the situation between U.S. forces, the Afghan people, and the Taliban. He often traveled to the Korengal Valley, otherwise known as the "valley of death", one of the most dangerous outposts in Afghanistan.

Engel reported on Firebase Restrepo and the soldiers of Viper Company stationed in the Korengal where he showed the fierce firefights taking place between U.S. soldiers and Taliban forces. Engel produced "Tip of the Spear", a series of NBC reports on the hardships and dangers faced by American soldiers, for which he won a 2008 George Foster Peabody Award. His coverage focused on the challenges of free elections in Afghanistan and the disruptions to democracy in the country.

=== Arab Spring ===
Engel reported extensively on the Arab Spring movement. He followed the uprisings in Egypt, Syria, Libya, Tunisia, Bahrain, and Yemen. In 2012, he was awarded the Alfred I. du-Pont-Columbia Award for his outstanding breaking news coverage of the uprisings.

In Egypt, Engel often reported from Tahrir Square, interviewing protestors in Tahrir Square as President Hosni Mubarak surrendered power to the Egyptian military. His reporting helped expose the role Egyptian labor strikes and worker protests played in the coup against Mubarak.

Engel reported on the revolution in Libya from the front lines, spending months traveling from rebel commanded areas in Benghazi to other rebel strongholds. In March 2011, Engel was caught in an artillery strike while interviewing fighters during a rebel advancement towards former Libyan leader Muammar Gaddafi's forces outside the city of Ajdabiya.

Engel traveled into Syria repeatedly with rebel militias and the Free Syrian Army. He reported on the advances made by rebel fighters within the country as well as the mass defections from Syrian President Bashar al-Assad's government army.

=== Kidnapping in Syria ===
On December 13, 2012, Engel and his five crew members, Aziz Akyavaş, Ghazi Balkiz, John Kooistra, Ian Rivers, and Ammar Cheikh Omar, were abducted in Syria. Having escaped after five days in captivity, Engel said he believed that a Shabiha group loyal to al-Assad was behind the abduction, and that the crew was freed by the Ahrar al-Sham group five days later. In April 2013, Engel recounted his experience in a Vanity Fair editorial, titled "The Hostage".

Engel's account was however challenged from early on, with Jamie Dettmer of The Daily Beast citing unnamed sources, who believed Engel and his team had been kidnapped by rogue rebel groups opposed to Assad. In April 2015, NBC had to revise the kidnapping account, following further investigations by The New York Times, which had conducted several dozen interviews, suggesting that the NBC team "was almost certainly taken by a Sunni criminal element affiliated with the Free Syrian Army," rather than by a loyalist Shia group.

== Awards ==
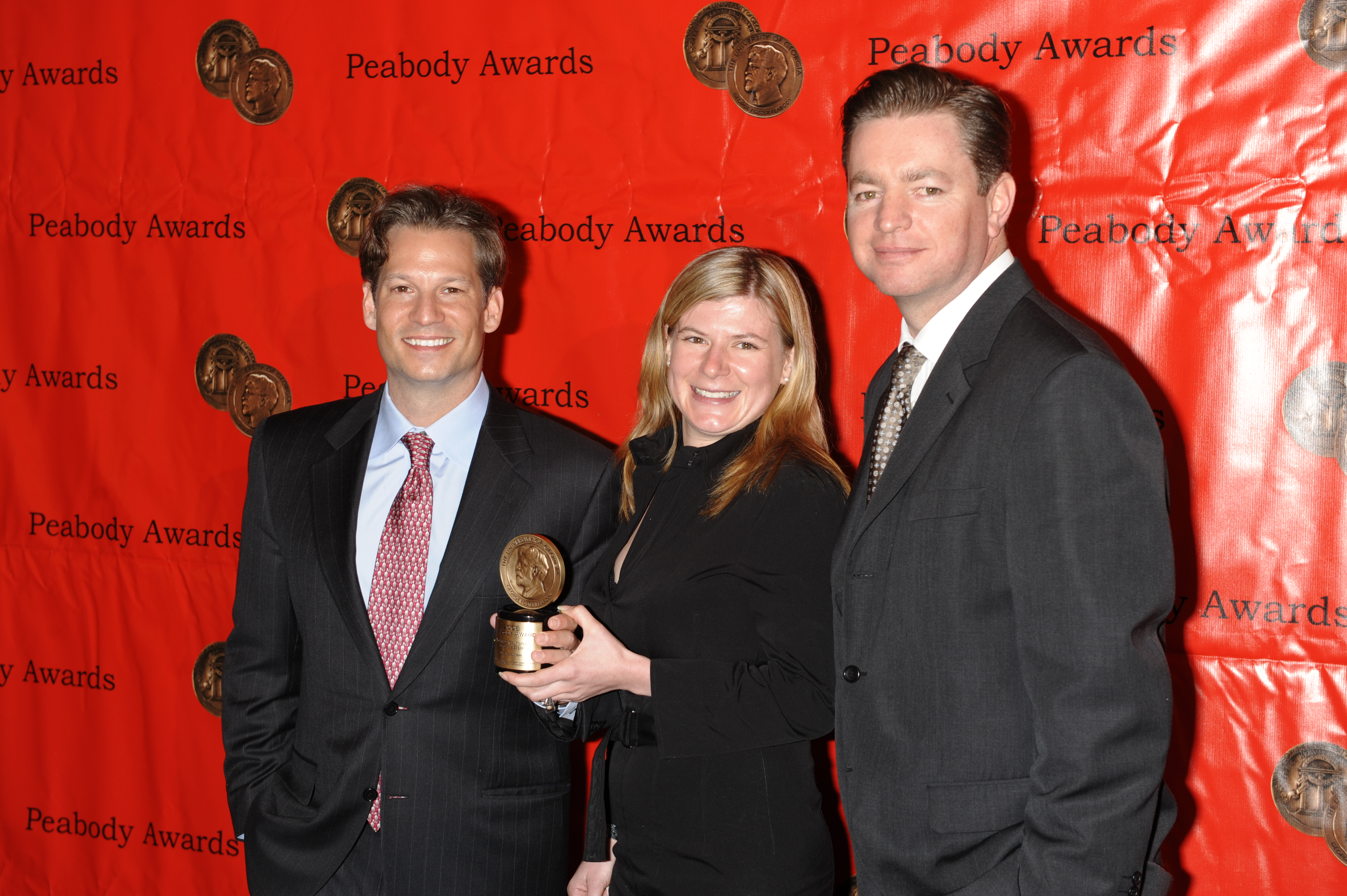
With Madeleine Haeringer and Bredun Edwards for Tip of the Spear at the 68th Annual Peabody Awards

- 2006, RTNDA Edward R. Murrow Award
- 2006, News & Documentary Emmy Award, Outstanding Coverage of a Breaking News Story in a Regularly Scheduled Newscast
- 2007, Medill Medal for Courage in Journalism
- 2008, Peabody Award, for his coverage of the Viper Company, a remote U.S. Army unit in Afghanistan
- 2008, Alfred I. duPont-Columbia University Award
- 2008, News & Documentary Emmy Award, Outstanding Continuing Coverage of a News Story in a Regularly Scheduled Newscast
- 2008, News & Documentary Emmy Award, Outstanding Live Coverage of a Breaking News Story – Long Form
- 2008, News & Documentary Emmy Award, Best Story in a Regularly Scheduled Newscast
- 2009, George Foster Peabody Award
- 2009, Edward R. Murrow Award
- 2009, Society of Professional Journalism Award
- 2009, News & Documentary Emmy Award, Outstanding Continuing Coverage of a News Story in a Regularly Scheduled Newscast
- 2010, News & Documentary Emmy Award, Best Story in a Regularly Scheduled Newscast
- 2010, News & Documentary Emmy Award, Outstanding News Discussion & Analysis
- 2010, Gracie Award
- 2010, OPC David Kaplan Award for spot news reporting for a series of three reports from Afghanistan
- 2011, David Bloom Award, Radio and Television Correspondents' Association, for Excellence in Enterprise Reporting
- 2011, Daniel Pearl Award
- 2011, Overseas Press Club Award
- 2012, Alfred I. duPont-Columbia University Award
- 2013, "Tex McCrary Award for Journalism Excellence, Congressional Medal of Honor Society"
- 2013, John Chancellor Award
- 2014, Peabody Award for his comprehensive look at the rise of ISIS
- 2015, Outstanding Coverage of a Breaking News Story in a Regularly Scheduled Newscast
- 2015, Outstanding Hard News Report in a Regularly Scheduled Newscast
- 2015, Fred Friendly First Amendment Award
- 2016, National Edward R. Murrow Award, NBC Nightly News with Lester Holt Newscast, November 19, 2015, "Terror in Paris" Correspondent - Richard Engel
- 2017, New York Press Club, Feature Reporting, On Assignment with Richard Engel - "A Matter of Trust"
- 2019, Scripps Howard Award - National, International Coverage
- 2019, Edward R Murrow Award for Continuing Coverage, Network News.
- 2019, Sigma Delta Chi Award
- 2020, National Headliner Award
- 2020, George Foster Peabody Award
- 2020, National Press Club Edwin M. Hood award for Diplomatic correspondence.
- 2020, New York Press Club Award.
- 2020, SPJ Sigma Delta Chi Award.
- 2021, Edward R. Murrow Award.
- 2022, NY Press Club Awards, Documentary National TV & Feature Reporting National TV.
- 2022, Deadline Club National TV Spot News Reporting.
- 2022, Telly Award Winner - Gold - On Assignment with Richard Engel, "Afghanistan: Graveyard of the Empires"

== Personal life ==
Engel was married to a fellow Stanford student; the couple divorced in 2005.

In May 2015, Engel married producer Mary Forrest. They have had two sons. Their firstborn son, Henry, was born in September 2015. Henry was born with Rett syndrome, a genetic disorder that is extremely rare in males; he died in August 2022 at age 6. Theodore, born in August 2019.

== Selected bibliography ==
- Nance, Malcolm; Engel, Richard (foreword) (2016). Defeating ISIS: Who They Are, How They Fight, What They Believe. Skyhorse Publishing. ISBN 978-1-510-71184-6.
- Engel, Richard (2016). And Then All Hell Broke Loose: Two Decades in the Middle East. Simon & Schuster. ISBN 978-1-451-63511-9.
