= Trump: The Kremlin Candidate? =

- Title card image
- Directed by: Matthew Hill; Tomiko Newson; Nick Sturdee
- Presented by: John Sweeney
- Narrated by: John Sweeney
- Country of origin: United Kingdom
- Original language: English

Production
- Producers: Andy Blackman; Matthew Hill; Tomiko Newson; Nick Sturdee
- Editors: Rachel Jupp; Joe Marcus
- Running time: 30 minutes
- Production company: Panorama

Original release
- Network: BBC One
- Release: 16 January 2017

Trump: The Kremlin Candidate? is a documentary film first broadcast by the programme Panorama on BBC One, and first aired in the United Kingdom on 16 January 2017, four days before the first inauguration of Donald Trump. It examined links between Trump associates and Russian officials and the relationship between Vladimir Putin and Donald Trump. It features investigative journalist John Sweeney, who journeyed to Russia, Ukraine, Lithuania, and the United States during the course of his research. Sweeney had prior experience on the subject matter, having interviewed Trump in 2013, and Putin in 2014. The film was directed by Matthew Hill, Tomiko Newson, and Nick Sturdee.

Throughout the documentary, Sweeney interviews intelligence and security analysts including John E. McLaughlin and Malcolm Nance, individuals with prior ties to Putin such as Aleksandr Dugin, Trump adviser Roger Stone and Russian politician Konstantin Kosachev. The documentary analyzes potential damaging information about Trump from the Steele dossier, and assesses whether Russian intelligence has blackmail in the form of kompromat which they could use to manipulate him. The film describes Russian interference in the 2016 United States elections and discusses whether Russian cyberwarfare impacted the elections. Finally, the documentary posits how a potential fallout between Trump and Putin could impact worldwide national security.

After the film's initial release, it was featured at the International Journalism Festival in Perugia, Italy, in April 2017. The Guardian selected the documentary among "Monday's best TV", and The National featured it as "TV Pick of the Day". The Times Union called the film's revelations, "shocking and alarming". The documentary garnered an official response in the form of a critical statement from the Russian Embassy in London.

== Contents summary ==
Investigative journalist John Sweeney delves into links between Trump associates and Russian officials. The documentary moves to different relevant locations including the United States, Russia, Lithuania, and armed conflict zones in Ukraine. Sweeney investigates the potential relationship between Donald Trump and Vladimir Putin. The documentary looks into the likelihood that cyberwarfare through Russian interference in the 2016 United States elections helped elect Trump as President of the United States.

Intelligence commentators interviewed in the film include: CrowdStrike chief technology officer Dmitri Alperovitch, former acting CIA Director John E. McLaughlin, and The Plot to Hack America author Malcolm Nance.

Those interviewed for historical context are Between East and West author Anne Applebaum, and Never Enough: Donald Trump and the Pursuit of Success author Michael D'Antonio. Politicians and advisers interviewed include: Tsargrad TV editor-in-chief Aleksandr Dugin, UK Independence Party member Nigel Farage, former Prime Minister of Russia Mikhail Kasyanov, Russian politician Konstantin Kosachev, and Trump political adviser Roger Stone. People appearing in archive footage include: Steve Bannon, Michael Flynn, Vladimir Putin, Rex Tillerson, and Donald Trump.

Sweeney interviews Putin political adviser Aleksandr Dugin in Moscow and debates with him about Russian government respect for civil liberties. Author Michael D'Antonio provides background on his assessment of Trump's character, telling Sweeney Trump views himself as a superhero in a comic book.

The film attempts to conclude if Trump may be able to be manipulated by Putin due to the possibility that Russian intelligence may possess secretly filmed evidence of what Michael Cohen referred to as the "infamous pee tape", an unproven incident mentioned in the Steele dossier. Sweeney examines what may befall Putin and Trump's nations were their warm ties to diminish over time. The documentary attempts to examine how the relationship between Trump and Putin could impact national security in Europe and globally.

== Production ==
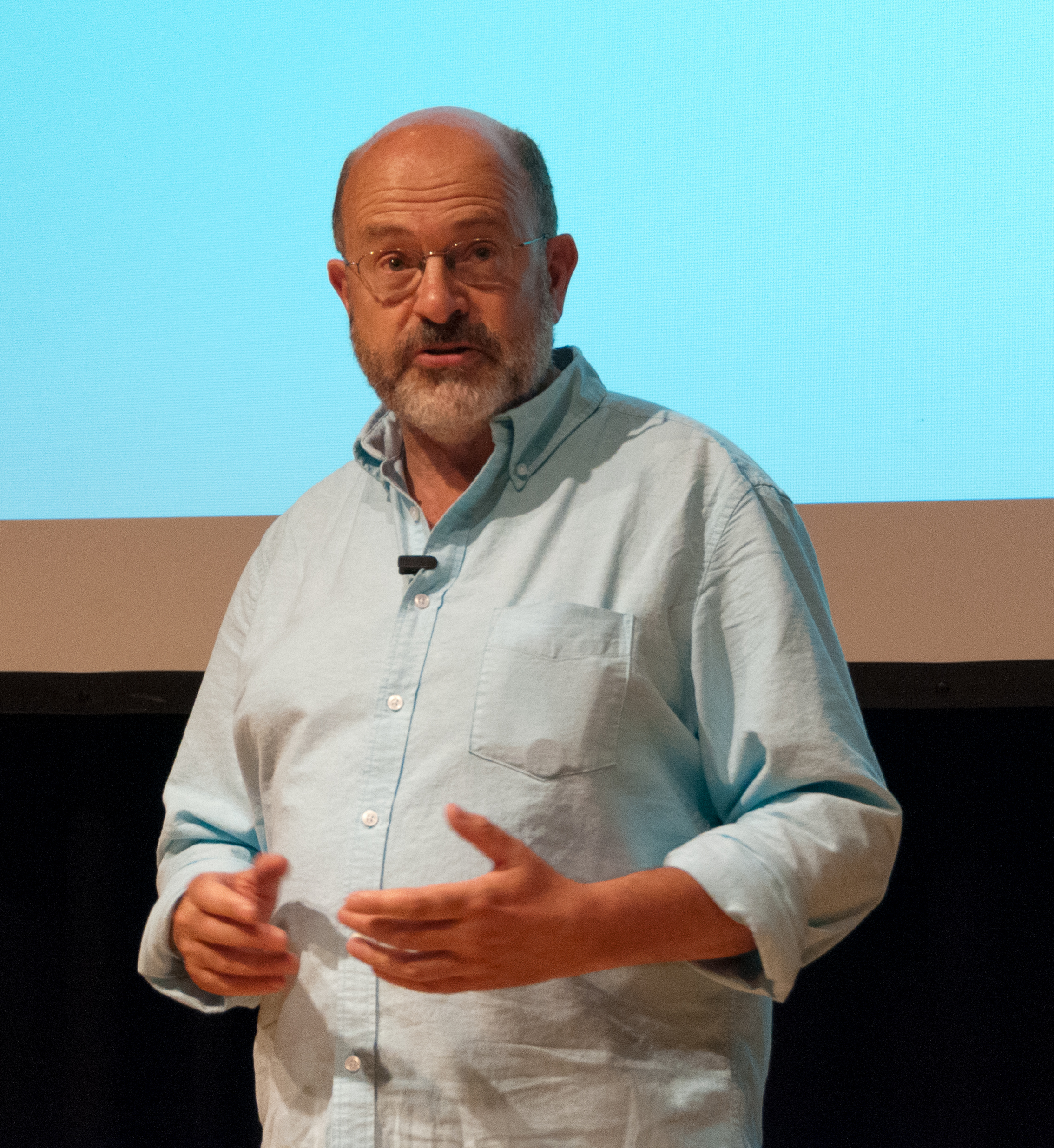
Investigative journalist and presenter of the documentary, John Sweeney

Prior to his work on the documentary, Sweeney had previously interviewed both Donald Trump and Vladimir Putin. He was invited by Trump to meet with him in 2013 at Trump National Golf Club in Bedminster, New Jersey. During an interview the same week at Trump Tower, Sweeney asked Trump about his friendship with Russian-born organized crime-connected individual Felix Sater; Trump responded by calling Sweeney "thick" and abruptly leaving the interview. Sweeney had interviewed Putin in 2014 in Siberia, and asked him about the downing of Malaysia Airlines Flight 17. Putin placed onus on Ukraine for the casualties, and Sweeney was blocked by Russian security from asking another question.

During the course of production for the documentary, investigative journalist John Sweeney journeyed from the UK to the United States, Ukraine, Lithuania, and Russia.

During Sweeney's interview with Putin political adviser Aleksandr Dugin in Moscow, he queried Dugin on the views of Vladimir Putin with regards to democratic ideals. Dugin criticized Sweeney's question, asserting the Western world had attempted to force democracy on other countries. Sweeney brought up Boris Nemtsov, a critic of Putin who was shot and killed immediately exterior to the Moscow Kremlin, and asked Dugin how the killing of Nemtsov reflected on the democratic values of Russia. Dugin countered, "If you are engaged in Wikileaks you can be murdered." When Sweeney queried Dugin to name U.S. reporters who had perished at the hands of the Obama administration, Dugin said it was a "completely stupid kind of conversation", ended the interview, and left the area.

== Release and reception ==
The documentary first aired on the programme Panorama on BBC One in the United Kingdom on 16 January 2017, four days before the Inauguration of Donald Trump. The program was made available on BBC iPlayer the same month. It was screened in Perugia, Italy on 6 April 2017 at the International Journalism Festival. Investigative journalists John Sweeney of the UK and Andrei Soldatov of Russia were in attendance at the screening.

The Guardian reviewer Ali Catterall wrote that the program was among "Monday's best TV". Catterall wrote, "John Sweeney travels to Russia, Ukraine and the US to investigate the most laughably open secret of recent times – the Kremlin's marionette-like manipulation of American politics – and ponders that the only thing scarier than Trump and Putin's friendship will be their falling out." Radio Times reporter Jack Seale reviewed the documentary, writing, "Ahead of Friday's inauguration, John Sweeney's Panorama report focuses on Trump's admiration for Vladimir Putin, a trait that sailed close to treason over the festive period when the President-elect sided with Russia in a diplomatic row with the US." Seale pointed out the question posed by the documentary about the potential relationship between Trump and Putin, "What, Sweeney wonders, will happen when these two eerily similar hotheads inevitably fall out?"

The National journalist Julie McDowall selected the documentary as "TV Pick of the Day". McDowall commented, "maybe we are about to see a US president, the most powerful man in the world, who could be cowed and ordered about by an aggressive Russia just because it apparently has a sex tape on him." Regarding the quality of Trump-Putin interactions, McDowall wrote, that the documentary "examines the relationship and asks if it is better for all if the two are buddies. If they fall out it could produce fall-out." Times Union contributor Lawrence White wrote, "John Sweeney investigates the Trump-Putin connection and what it may mean for the world's collective well being." White commented, "The details in the investigative report are shocking and alarming."

On 17 January 2017, the Russian Embassy in London issued a statement critical of the documentary, where they called it, "another low in outright post-truth propaganda in the defense of the unsustainable status quo in Britain, US and worldwide."

== See also ==
- Business projects of Donald Trump in Russia
- Donald Trump's disclosure of classified information to Russia
- Efforts to impeach Donald Trump
- Timeline of Russian interference in the 2016 United States elections
