= The Early Bird (newsletter) =

Government news clipping service

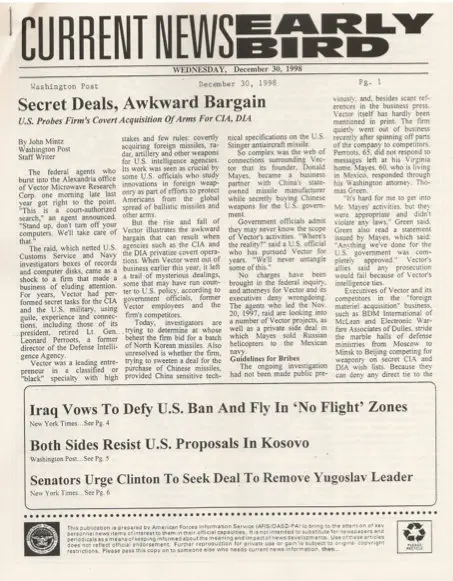
The Early Bird, December 30, 1998

The Early Bird was a newsletter collated daily by public affairs officials from the United States Department of Defense and released early every morning from 1963 until 2013. It contained approximately three dozen stories taken from publications ranging from major newspapers to niche defence journals.

The service originated in 1963 when the branches of the military's own clipping services were consolidated with the Pentagon's into a single entity named the News Clipping and Analysis Service. Originally known as the Yellow Bird due to the canary yellow top page, designed to stand out on desks piled with papers, as the US' involvement in the Vietnam War progressed, the service started to issue multiple clippings daily, with the first version of the day taking on the Early Bird name. It became an official publication of the Defense Department's public affairs office in 1989.

Initially delivered internally in print throughout the Pentagon and then morphing to a PDF in the early 1990s, by the time the service was closed down on October 1, 2013, it had a monthly readership of close to 1.5 million civilian and military staff through both email and through the Defence Department's intranet networks.

The service was suspended on October 1, 2013, by the 2013 United States federal government shutdown, but despite the shutdown ending on October 17, it failed to return to publication. On November 1, 2013, Colonel Steven Warren, director of defense press operations, confirmed that following a six-month review into The Early Bird, it would cease operations, instead being replaced by a new newsletter called the Morning News of Note, with a circulation list of only 300 people.

Multiple reasons were cited for the discontinuation of the service including unhappiness from publishers about copyright infringement, and the rise of personalized online news aggregation services, the main cause was the undue prominence it was believed to give to articles included in it, according to Col. Warren:

The Early Bird became the tail that wagged the dog. A small story that lands in the Bird can have a big impact, since we provided a vastly enlarged readership for some small, niche news outlets. And placement of stories by mainstream media seemed to drive the daily agenda in ways that never were intended.

== In popular culture ==
The Early Bird is frequently referenced in Tom Clancy's novels, with fictional CIA analyst and later President of the United States Jack Ryan a regular reader.
