= Reign of Terror (book) =

2021 book about the 9/11 era

Reign of Terror: How the 9/11 Era Destabilized America and Produced Trump
- Author: Spencer Ackerman
- Language: English
- Publisher: Viking Press
- Publication date: August 10, 2021
- Publication place: United States
- Pages: 448
- ISBN: 978-1-984879-77-6

Reign of Terror: How the 9/11 Era Destabilized America and Produced Trump is a 2021 book by Spencer Ackerman. The book discusses how the September 11 attacks and subsequent war on terrorism created the political environment in the United States that resulted in the election of Donald Trump in the 2016 United States presidential election.
