= Non-communications signals =

In signals intelligence (SIGINT), non-communications signals are any signals sent out for a purpose other than communicating information. This includes radar emissions and emissions from instrumentation (which provide information, but are not sent out for the purpose of providing information to others).

Electronic signals intelligence (ELINT), which came to be studied in great detail after World War II, attempts to detect and analyze enemy non-communications signals. Foreign instrumentation signals intelligence (FISINT) focuses specifically on non-communications signals emitted by instrumentation, including telemetry signals sent between components of a system.
