= Great Terror (disambiguation) =

The Great Terror may refer to:

- The Reign of Terror (1793–1794), a period of extreme violence during the French Revolution, the last weeks of which are sometimes referred to as the Red Terror or Great Terror
- The Great Purge (1936–1938), a campaign of intense political repression in the Soviet Union
  - The Great Terror (book), a 1968 book about the Great Purge
