= Henley-Putnam School of Strategic Security =

American for-profit online university

Henley-Putnam School of Strategic Security National American University
- Motto: Advanced Training for Tomorrow’s Security Leaders
- Type: Private for-profit online school
- Established: 2001; 25 years ago
- Parent institution: National American University
- President: Dr. Cindy Mathena
- Location: Rapid City, South Dakota, United States; 37.36957°N 121.91635°W
- Campus: Online
- Colors: Black, White, and Red

The Henley-Putnam School of Strategic Security, previously Henley-Putnam University, is a school of National American University, a private for-profit online university. It focuses on intelligence management, terrorism and counterterrorism studies, strategic security and protection management. Henley-Putnam offers over 150 courses and 10 degree programs. Faculty members tend to have real-world knowledge from working in the intelligence/defense industry.

== History ==
The original university was conceived and founded by Nirmalya Bhowmick, with co-founders Michael Corcoran and Sheldon Greaves.

The school was named to honor American Revolutionary War intelligence officers Colonel David Henley and General Israel Putnam, each of whom personified a different approach to the practice of espionage. Henley, contemplative and precise, specialized in organizing streams of raw data and extrapolating from it an enemy’s strengths and weaknesses. Putnam focused on acquiring intelligence through the active use of agents, debriefing deserters, and interrogating prisoners.

In July 2006, Liberty Capital Partners, a private equity firm, acquired Henley-Putnam.

Henley-Putnam's enrollment grew from 125 students in 2008 to 515 students by the summer of 2010.

=== Acquisition by National American University Holdings ===
National American University purchased Henley-Putnam University on July 21, 2017.

== Academics ==
The school has a curriculum of more than 150 courses, with ten bachelor's, master's and a doctorate program. Its faculty comes from the military, law enforcement, and the counterterrorism and intelligence communities, with an emphasis on "real world experience"..

In 2026, the Higher Learning Commission approved three new reduced-credit bachelor's degree programs at National American University, including two offered through the Henley-Putnam School of Strategic Security: The BS Criminal Justice – FOCUSED and the BS Strategic Security and Protection Management – FOCUSED. The programs require 135 quarter credits rather than the traditional 180 quarter credits and are designed for completion in approximately three years of full-time study.

== Alumni ==
- Nick Freitas – Virginia state lawmaker
