= Spencer Ackerman =

American journalist and writer

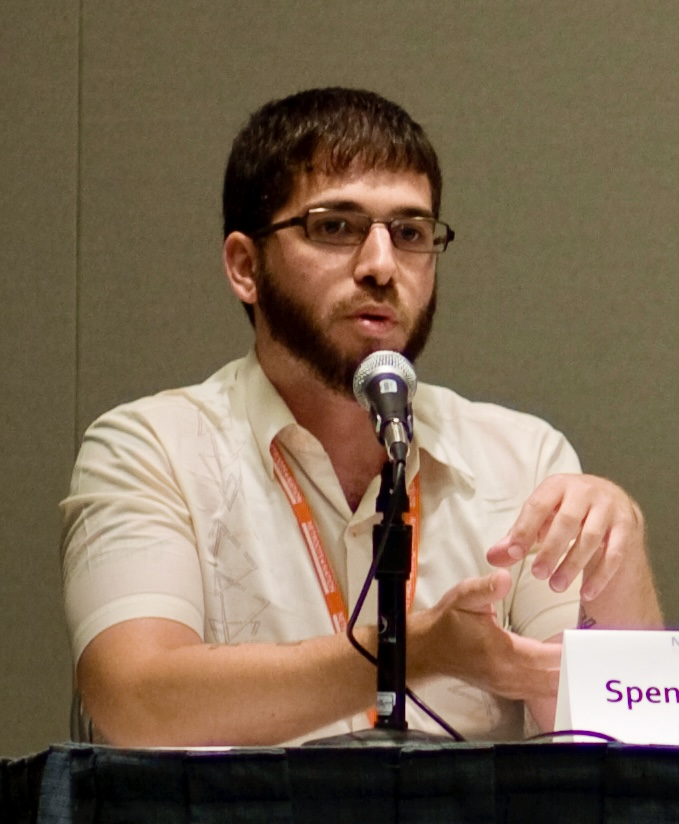
- Ackerman at Netroots Nation in July 2008
- Born: June 1, 1980 (age 46); New York City, U.S.
- Education: Rutgers University (BA)
- Occupation: Journalist
- Years active: 2002–present
- Known for: National security journalism
- Notable work: Reign of Terror
- Awards: 2012 National Magazine Award for Digital Media; 2014 Pulitzer Prize for Public Service
- Website: forever-wars.com

Spencer Ackerman (born June 1, 1980) is an American journalist and writer. Focusing primarily on national security, he began his career at The New Republic in 2002 before writing for Wired, The Guardian, and The Daily Beast.

He won a 2012 National Magazine Award for reporting on biased FBI training materials and shared in a 2014 Pulitzer Prize for his coverage of the 2013 global surveillance disclosures. His book Reign of Terror: How the 9/11 Era Destabilized America and Produced Trump was named a best nonfiction book of 2021 by The New York Times, The Washington Post and Foreign Policy.

== Early life and education ==
Born to a Jewish family on June 1, 1980, Ackerman grew up in a politically active household and started attending protests at age ten. He graduated from the Bronx High School of Science in 1998 and Rutgers University in New Brunswick, New Jersey in 2002 with a Bachelor of Arts in philosophy.

While writing for Rutgers' student newspaper, The Daily Targum, he earned a Certificate of Merit from the Columbia Scholastic Press Association in news writing for his coverage of the recount in Florida following the 2000 U.S. presidential election. He also worked for the New York Press, a free alternative weekly.

== Career ==
After graduating from Rutgers, Ackerman moved to Washington, D.C. to join The New Republic where he covered national security. In an interview with Columbia Journalism Review, Ackerman said witnessing the September 11 attacks influenced his decision to cover national security, which he viewed as the most important issue facing the nation at the time. With colleague John Judis, he cowrote an article that led to the Plame affair.

Initially a supporter of the invasion of Iraq, Ackerman became disillusioned and, beginning in January 2004, expressed opposition to the conflict in Iraq'd, a blog dedicated to covering post invasion developments in the country. He worked at The New Republic (TNR) until 2006, when he started a blog titled Too Hot for TNR and was fired over what he described as irreconcilable ideological differences. Editor Franklin Foer said he fired Ackerman for insubordination and disparaging the magazine on his blog.

Ackerman next began writing for The American Prospect as well as Talking Points Memo. In a column for The Wall Street Journal, Marie Beaudette named Ackerman as part of a "blogging elite" in Washington, D.C. Ackerman also contributed to the Washington Monthly on national security.

=== The Washington Independent and Attackerman ===
In December 2007, Ackerman joined The Washington Independent as a senior fellow covering national security and foreign policy. After ending publication of Too Hot for TNR in April 2008, he started a second national security blog, called Attackerman, at ThinkProgress. In June 2008, Ackerman moved the blog to Firedoglake.

In August 2009, Politico reported that Ackerman was one of numerous reporters profiled by the Rendon Group, a public relations firm hired by the Pentagon to vet journalists requesting embeds with U.S. forces in Iraq. The requests were granted based on whether their coverage of the conflict portrayed the U.S. military in a positive light. The revelations prompted the military to end their contract with the firm.

=== Wired ===
Ackerman joined Wired magazine's Danger Room in June 2010, a national security blog.

In July 2010, The Daily Caller reported on Ackerman's membership in JournoList, a private Google Groups forum for discussing politics and the news media created by Ezra Klein in February 2007. Responding to the Jeremiah Wright controversy surrounding Barack Obama's presidential campaign, Ackerman said, "If the right forces us all to either defend Wright or tear him down, no matter what we choose, we lose the game they've put upon us. Instead, take one of them–Fred Barnes, Karl Rove, who cares–and call them racists". Ackerman was also quoted as saying, "find a right winger's [sic] and smash it through a plate-glass window. Take a snapshot of the bleeding mess and send it out in a Christmas card to let the right know that it needs to live in a state of constant fear. Obviously, I mean this rhetorically."

Ackerman's comments were made while writing for The Washington Independent. In a column for The Wall Street Journal, James Taranto criticized Ackerman for "privately strategizing about how to suppress the news." Ackerman faced additional criticism from conservatives like Ed Morrissey, Daniel Foster, Matt Welch, and Andrew Sullivan. Steve Krakauer of Mediaite and Jonathan Chait of The New Republic, however, questioned whether the forum represented a controversy and Chait noted that conservative bloggers participate in similar forums. A spokesperson for Wired defended Ackerman saying that the publication was aware of his political views.

Due to his blog's affiliation with Firedoglake, Ackerman experienced difficulties obtaining permanent press credentials from the Congressional Press Gallery. He left Firedoglake in December 2010 to host the Attackerman blog independently. In 2011, he won the National Magazine Award for Digital Media for his series on exposing the use of Islamophobic material to train recruits in counterterrorism at the FBI Academy in Quantico, Virginia. After the revelations, at the mandate of the Obama administration, the FBI launched an investigation and turned to the U.S. Army's Combating Terrorism Center at West Point before eventually purging the materials.

In a January 2012 column for Tablet magazine, Ackerman expressed disagreement with the use of the term "Israel Firster", writing, "if you can’t do it without sounding like Pat Buchanan, who has nothing but antipathy and contempt for Jews, then you’ve lost the debate." Identifying himself as being part of the Jewish left, Ackerman noted the term was first used by far-right activist Willis Carto and neo-Nazi David Duke. The Jerusalem Post editorial board and Commentary's then assistant editor, Alana Goodman came to Ackerman's defense.

=== The Guardian ===
In 2007, Ackerman wrote a freelance opinion piece in the Comment is free column for British newspaper The Guardian, wherein he compared then U.S. president George W. Bush to the satirical character of Alan Patridge, played by British comedian Steve Coogan. The article garnered the attention of British comedian and satirist Armando Iannucci, co-creator of the Alan Partridge character, who contacted Ackerman to work as a political consultant on his film In the Loop, which lampoons the British-U.S. special relationship during the Iraq War.

In June 2013, Ackerman joined The Guardian as a national security editor, initially at their Washington bureau before relocating back to New York. During his onboarding process, Ackerman's job orientation functioned as cover for a briefing on the 2013 global surveillance disclosures, which the publication had just received from Edward Snowden. He contributed to several stories on the NSA’s surveillance programs based on these leaks, leading to The Guardian winning the 2014 Pulitzer Prize for Public Service. Ackerman and colleagues also shared the Investigative Reporters and Editors medal for investigative journalisml and the 2014 Scripps Howard Foundation Roy W. Howard Award for Public Service Reporting.

Alongside his colleague Zach Stafford, Ackerman was a 2016 finalist for the Online News Association's Online Journalism Awards for their reporting on a previously little-known detention facility run by the Chicago Police known as Homan Square. The investigation began when Ackerman profiled the U.S. military's employment of Richard Zuley, a Chicago Police investigator, to develop interrogation techniques on detainees at the Guantanamo Bay detention camp. A source said that the Chicago Police operated a facility resembling a black site. Ackerman uncovered the facility and revealed that interrogators engaged in beating, rape, excessive shackling, deprived arrestees access to counsel for extended periods, and turned attorneys away from the facility.

=== The Daily Beast ===
Ackerman joined The Daily Beast as a senior national security correspondent in May 2017, reuniting with his former editor from Wired, Noah Shachtman.

=== Forever Wars ===
In 2021, Ackerman stepped down at The Daily Beast and launched Forever Wars, a newsletter focused on international politics through a socialist lens, critiquing American militarism and exceptionalism.

=== Reign of Terror ===
Ackerman's book Reign of Terror, a history and critique of the war on terror was published in August 2021. It was named a best nonfiction book of 2021 by The New York Times, The Washington Post, and Foreign Policy.

=== Podcasts ===
In 2019, Ackerman co-hosted with Laura Hudson, the Citadel Dropouts, a Wired podcast about the final season of Game of Thrones.

=== Comics ===
In 2023, Ackerman co-wrote with Evan Narcisse the DC Comics mini-series, Waller vs. Wildstorm, under the DC Black Label imprint. In October 2024, he began writing the new volume of Iron Man for Marvel Comics.

== Awards ==
The Guardian

- 2014 Pulitzer Prize for Public Service (with Glenn Greenwald, Ewen MacAskill, Laura Poitras, James Ball, Julian Borger, Dan Roberts, Dominic Rushe, and Paul Lewis)
- 2014 Investigative Reporters and Editors Medal (with Glenn Greenwald, Ewen MacAskill, Laura Poitras, James Ball, Julian Borger, and Dominic Rushe)
- 2013 Scripps Howard Foundation Roy W. Howard Award for Public Service Reporting (with Glenn Greenwald, Ewen MacAskill, Laura Poitras, and James Ball)

Wired

- 2012 National Magazine Award for Digital Media

The Daily Targum

- 2002 Columbia Scholastic Press Association Certificate of Merit for News Writing

== Works ==
- Ackerman, Spencer (August 10, 2021). Reign of Terror: How the 9/11 Era Destabilized America and Produced Trump. Viking. ISBN 9781984879776.
- Nance, Malcolm; Ackerman, Spencer (foreword) (October 10, 2016). The Plot to Hack America: How Putin's Cyberspies and WikiLeaks Tried to Steal the 2016 Election. Skyhorse Publishing. p. 216. ISBN 9781510723320.
