= Muslim attitudes toward terrorism =

Attitude of Islam's followers to terrorist actions

There is a wide range of Muslim attitudes towards terrorism.

The killing of innocent human beings (whether Muslim or non-Muslim) and unlawful confiscation of property are major sins in Islam and strictly forbidden by sharia.

== Condemnation and opposition ==
In the article "Why are there no condemnations from Muslim sources against terrorists?" Ontario Consultants on Religious Tolerance summarizes:

A common complaint among non-Muslims is that Muslim religious authorities do not condemn terrorist attacks. The complaints often surface in letters to the editors of newspapers, on phone-in radio shows, in Internet mailing lists, forums, etc. A leader of an evangelical Christian para-church group, broadcasting over Sirius Family Net radio, stated that he had done a thorough search on the Internet for a Muslim statement condemning terrorism, without finding a single item. Actually, there are lots of fatwas and other statements issued which condemn attacks on innocent civilians. Unfortunately, they are largely ignored by newspapers, television news, radio news and other media outlets.

Many Muslims have spoken out against 9/11.

A 2007 Pew Research Center study of several nations throughout the Muslim world showed that opposition to suicide bombing in the Muslim world is increasing, with a majority of Muslims surveyed in 10 out of the 16 of the countries responding that suicide bombings and other violence against civilians is "never" justified, though an average of 38% believe it is justified at least rarely. Opposition to Hamas was the majority opinion in only 4 out of the 16 countries surveyed, as was opposition to Hezbollah. The Pew Research Study did not include Iran, Iraq, Saudi Arabia, Syria, Afghanistan, Tunisia, Libya, and Algeria in the survey, although densely populated Muslim countries such as Pakistan, Egypt, Indonesia, and Bangladesh were included.

A YouGov survey for the Daily Telegraph, published two weeks after the July 2005 bombings in the London Underground, showed that 88% of British Muslims were opposed to the bombings, while 6% (about 100,000 individuals) fully supported them, and one British Muslim in four expressed some sympathy with the motives of the bombers. A 2007 poll found that one Muslim in four thought the Government had staged the bombings and framed the Muslims convicted. A 2011 study by Pew Research showed that 64% of Muslim Americans thought that there was not much or no support among them for extremism, while 6% thought there was a great deal, and 15% thought there was a fair amount. A 2015 survey showed that most people in many nations with significant Muslim populations view the Islamic State of Iraq and Syria unfavorably; these views were especially common in Jordan and Lebanon. However, in Pakistan, 62% of people polled offered no opinion, while 20% of Muslims in Nigeria and 12% of those in Malaysia had a favorable view of ISIS. The survey did not include Iran, Saudi Arabia, Algeria, Yemen, Syria, Iraq, Egypt, Afghanistan, Bangladesh, Sudan and Libya.

In 2010 Muhammad Tahir-ul-Qadri issued the Fatwa on Terrorism, endorsed by Al-Azhar University in Cairo, Egypt.

In 2008 the 9 killed Mumbai militants who perpetrated the 2008 Mumbai attacks were refused an Islamic burial by influential Muslim Jama Masjid Trust who stated 'People who committed this heinous crime cannot be called Muslim'.

=== Northwest Airlines Flight 253 ===
The bombing attempt on Northwest Airlines Flight 253 was condemned by Muslim groups. In Canada, a group of Canadian and U.S. Islamic leaders issued a fatwa, or religious edict, condemning any attacks by extremists or terrorists on the United States or Canada and declaring that an attack by extremists on the two countries would constitute an attack on Muslims living in North America. "In our view, these attacks are evil, and Islam requires Muslims to stand up against this evil," said the fatwa signed by the 20 imams associated with the Islamic Supreme Council of Canada. It concludes that Muslims "must expose any person, Muslim or non-Muslim, who would cause harm to fellow Canadians or Americans". One of the imams was reported saying: "it is religious obligation upon Muslims, based upon the Qur'anic teachings, that we have to be loyal to the country where we live". The fatwa also indicated that religious leaders have a duty to show others around the world that Muslims in Canada and the U.S. "have complete freedom to practice Islam" and that "any attack on Canada and the United States is an attack on the freedom of Canadian and American Muslims."

=== 2011 Alexandria bombing ===
As gesture of solidarity with the country's Coptic Christian minority, Egyptian Muslims showed up at churches on the eve of the Coptic Christmas on 6 January 2011 during mass service forming a "human shield" against any possible further attacks. In the days before the mass, Muslims and Copts joined together in a show of solidarity that included street protests, rallies, and widespread Facebook unity campaigns calling for an "Egypt for All". In Lebanon, separate condemnations came from the Sunni Mufti of the Republic Mohammad Qabbani and Deputy Head of the Shiite Supreme Council Abdul Amir Qabalan. Hamas has also condemned the bombing in Alexandria, assigning the blame to hidden hands that do not wish well for Egypt and its Muslim and Christian people and seek to inflame sectarian strife. Hamas in its statement sent condolences to Egypt and the victims' families, and hoped that facts would be disclosed the soonest and that those responsible would be brought to justice.

In response to the attacks, Amr Khaled, an influential Egyptian Muslim preacher, launched a campaign to fight sectarian incitement made on the internet, which he believed to be a cause of the violence witnessed on New Year's Eve.

=== Yemen ===
In November 2010, thousands of Yemeni tribesmen vowed to back the government's efforts in its battles against Al-Qaeda and promised to fight alongside the troops. Chieftain Naji bin Abdul-Aziz al-Shaif of the powerful, northern Bakeel tribe and the organizer of the rally stated: "We will fight against al-Qaida group as it harmed the reputation of the country, Yemeni tribes and Muslims...We expressed our sorrow to all countries and people who were harmed by al-Qaida and we demanded President Ali Abdullah Saleh to handle the situation and we will stand by him."

== Islamism ==
Iranian Ayatollah Ozma Seyyed Yousef Sanei issued a fatwa (ruling) that suicide attacks against civilians are legitimate only in the context of war.

Abdelrahman al-Rashid, a Muslim and the managing director of Arab news channel Al-Arabiya, stated that "It is a certain fact that not all Muslims are terrorists, but it is equally certain, and exceptionally painful, that almost all terrorists are Muslims" and blamed radical clerics for hijacking the peace-loving and tolerant religion of Islam. Statistics compiled by the United States government's Counterterrorism Center present a more complicated picture. 21% of fatalities of known and specified terrorist incidents in 2006 were attributed to Islamic extremists. A majority of over-all incidents were considered of either "unknown/unspecified" or a secular political nature. The vast majority of the "unknown/unspecified" terrorism fatalities did however happen in Islamic regions such as Iraq, Afghanistan and India.

According to the Country Reports on Terrorism 2011 published in 2012 by the U.S. National Counterterrorism Center (NCTC), "Sunni extremists accounted for the greatest number of terrorist attacks and fatalities for the third consecutive year. More than 5,700 incidents were attributed to Sunni extremists, accounting for nearly 56 percent of all attacks and about 70 percent of all fatalities." The report said that in 2011, a total of 10,283 terrorism attacks across the world killed 12,533 people. Terrorism was also blamed for 25,903 injuries and 5,554 kidnappings. According to the NCTC, of the 12,533 terrorism-related deaths worldwide, 8,886 were perpetrated by "Sunni extremists", 1,926 by "secular/political/anarchist" groups, 1,519 by "unknown" factions, and 170 by a category described as "other"

== Demonstrations in support ==
Upon Osama bin Laden's death, some Muslims in the UK came out on the streets in support of bin Laden, praising him as an Islamic hero and condemned the role of the US and the West in killing him. The protest was organised by the activist Anjem Choudary, who earlier praised both 7/7 and the September 11 attacks, and was later jailed for his support of ISIS.

== Polls ==
=== Gallup polls ===
A Gallup poll published in 2011, "suggests that one's religious identity and level of devotion have little to do with one's views about targeting civilians." The results of the survey suggested that "human development and governance - not piety or culture" were the strongest factors in explaining the public's view of violence toward civilians. In a Gallup World Poll in 2011, residents of the Organisation of Islamic Cooperation (OIC) member states were less likely to justify the targeting and killing of civilians than residents of non-OIC states:

- In Organisation of Islamic Cooperation (OIC) member states, 18% believe military attacks on civilians justified and 14% believe individual attacks on civilians justified.
- In non-OIC states, 24% believe military attacks on civilians justified and 17% believe individual attacks on civilians justified.

In a regional breakdown, Gallup found that North Americans were most likely to justify military attacks on civilians, while residents of the MENA (Middle East and North Africa) region were most likely to oppose them. When asked about whether it is justifiable for the military to target and kill civilians:

- In Asia, 58% said it is never justifiable, 12% said it is sometimes justifiable, and 15% said it depends.
- In the post-Soviet states, 56% said it is never justifiable, 8% said it is sometimes justifiable, and 20% said it depends.
- In the MENA (Middle East and North Africa) region, 85% said it is never justifiable, 9% said it is sometimes justifiable, and 4% said it depends.
- In Sub-Saharan Africa, 66% said it is never justifiable, 17% said it is sometimes justifiable, and 11% said it depends.
- In the United States and Canada, 50% said it is never justifiable, 47% said it is sometimes justifiable, and 2% said it depends.
- In Europe, 69% said it is never justifiable, 12% said it is sometimes justifiable, and 11% said it depends.

In another 2011 Gallup poll, they surveyed Americans, and found that Muslim Americans were less likely to justify the targeting and killing of civilians than other Americans.

John Esposito, using poll data from Gallup, wrote in 2008 that Muslims and Americans were equally likely to reject violence against civilians. He also found that those Muslims who support violence against civilians are no more religious than Muslims who do not. A later 2011 Gallup World Poll found that, in the MENA (Middle East and North Africa) region, "those who reject military and individual attacks on civilians are more likely to say religion is an important part of their daily lives."

=== Other polls ===
According to an ICM Research poll in 2006, 20% of British Muslims felt sympathy with the July 7 terrorist bombers' "feelings and motives", although 99% thought the bombers were wrong to carry out the attack. In another poll by NOP Research in 2006, almost one in four British Muslims believe that the 7/7 attacks on London were justified.

In a Pew Research study from 2006, at least 1 in 4 respondents in six Muslim-majority nations surveyed, except Turkey where it was 4%, had at least some confidence in Bin Laden. In Jordan, 24% expressed at least some confidence, in Pakistan, 38%, and in Nigeria, 61%. In the 4 European countries surveyed, it varied greatly. 5% of Muslim in France and 7% in Germany expressed at least some confidence, in United Kingdom and Spain however this number was 14 and 16% respectively.

Pew has shown a large drop in confidence in Bin Laden from 2003 to 2011 amongst nations it surveyed. Confidence in him decreased to 34% in 2011 in Palestine, from a high of 74% in 2003. The same trend was observed in other nations: 26% in Indonesia as compared to 59% in 2003, 13% in Jordan in 2011 as compared to 56% in 2003, 3% in Turkey in 2011 as compared to 15% in 2003. The lowest was in Lebanon where only 1% had any confidence in him, down from 19% in 2003. Change compared to 6 countries surveyed in 2010 was minimal. Egypt however showed a confidence of 22% as compared to 19% in 2010.

A 2010 Zogby poll reported that 69% of American Muslims supported stronger laws to fight terrorism.

A 2013 Pew Research Center poll asked Muslims around the world whether suicide bombings and other forms of violence against civilians are justified to defend Islam. Globally, 72% of Muslims said it is never justified (compared to 81% of those in the US, according to a 2011 survey). About 14% of Muslims in the nations surveyed (and 8% of Muslims in the US) said violence against civilians is "often" or "sometimes" justified. 46% of Muslims in Bangladesh believe attacks are either somewhat justified or often justified or rarely justified, 28% in Malaysia, 15% in Iraq, 44% in Jordan, 57% in Egypt, 57% in Afghanistan and 55% in the Palestinian territories. The survey did not include some Muslim nations, such as Iran, Saudi Arabia, Algeria, Yemen, Syria, and Libya, but did include densely populated Muslim countries such as Pakistan, Turkey, Egypt, Nigeria and Indonesia. According to a 2007 poll conducted by the PolicyExchange think tank in Britain, nearly 60% said they would prefer to live under British law, while 37% of 16- to 24-year-olds said they would prefer sharia law, against 17% of those over 55. Also 36% of 16- to 24-year-olds British Muslims believed that those converting to another religion should be executed. Less than a fifth of those over 55 think so.

In 2004, a year after the invasion of Iraq, Pew Research Center survey found that suicide bombings against Americans and other Westerners in Iraq were seen as "justifiable" by many Jordanians (70%), Pakistanis (46%), and Turks (31%). At the same time, the survey found that support for the U.S.-led war on terror had increased.

A 2005 Pew Research study, that involved 17,000 people in 17 countries showed support for terrorism was declining in the Muslim world along with a growing belief that Islamic extremism represents a threat to those countries. A 2005 Daily Telegraph survey showed that 88% of Muslims said the July 2005 bombings in the London Underground were unjustified, while 6% disagreed. However it also found that 24% of British Muslims showed some sympathy with the people who carried out the attacks.

Polls taken by Saudi owned Al Arabiya and Gallup suggested moderate support for the September 11 terrorist attacks within the Arab world, with 36% of Arabs polled by Al Arabiya saying the 9/11 attacks were morally justified, 38% disagreeing and 26% of those polled being unsure. A 2008 study, produced by Gallup, found similar results with 38.6% of Muslims questioned believing the 9/11 attacks were justified. Another poll conducted, in 2005 by the Fafo Foundation in the Palestinian Authority, found that 65% of respondents supported the September 11 attacks.

=== Suicide bombings ===
In a 2006 Pew poll in response to a question on whether suicide bombing and other forms of violence against civilian targets to defend Islam could be justified,

==== In Europe ====
- (35 vs 64) 64% of Muslims in France believed it could never be justified, 19% believed it could be justified rarely, 16% thought it could be justified often or sometimes.
- (24 vs 70) 70% of Muslims in the UK believed it could never be justified, 9% believed it could be justified rarely, 15% thought it could be justified often or sometimes.
- (13 vs 83) 83% of Muslims in Germany believed it could never be justified, 6% believed it could be justified rarely, 7% thought it could be justified often or sometimes.
- (25 vs 69) 69% of Muslims in Spain believed it could never be justified, 9% believed it could be justified rarely, 16% thought it could be justified often or sometimes.

==== In mainly Muslim countries ====
- (53 vs 45) 45% of Muslims in Egypt believed it could never be justified, 25% believed it could be justified rarely, 28% thought it could be justified often or sometimes.
- (26 vs 61) 61% of Muslims in Turkey believed it could never be justified, 9% believed it could be justified rarely, 17% thought it could be justified often or sometimes
- (57 vs 43) 43% of Muslims in Jordan believed it could never be justified, 28% believed it could be justified rarely, 29% thought it could be justified often or sometimes.
- (69 vs 28) 28% of Muslims in Nigeria believed it could never be justified, 23% believed it could be justified rarely, 46% thought it could be justified often or sometimes.
- (22 vs 69) 69% of Muslims in Pakistan believed it could never be justified, 8% believed it could be justified rarely, 14% thought it could be justified often or sometimes.
- (28 vs 71) 71% of Muslims in Indonesia believed it could never be justified, 18% believed it could be justified rarely, 10% thought it could be justified often or sometimes.

In 2007, 17% of Muslims in Palestinian territories believed it could rarely or never be justified, and 70% thought it could be justified sometimes or often. In comparison, 32% stated in 2014 it was never justified, while 13% said it was rarely justified, 46% said it is often or sometimes justified. A 2011 report by Pew Research stated that 81% of American Muslim thought it was never justified, 5% said rarely, 7% sometimes and 1% often.

In a 2013 poll, 91% of Muslims in Iraq said suicide bombings to defend Islam from enemies could never/rarely be justified while 7% said it was often/sometimes. In Bosnia and Herzegovina, 96% said it was never/rarely justified while 3% said often/sometimes. In Albania, 93% said it was never/rarely justified while 6% said often/sometimes. In Russia, 90% said never/rarely while 4% said often/sometimes. In Kosovo, 82% said it was never/rarely justified while 11% said often/sometimes. In Azerbaijan, 96% said it was never/rarely while 1% said often/sometimes. In Tajikistan, 85% said never/rarely while 3% said often/sometimes. In Kazakhstan, 95% said never/rarely while 2% said often/sometimes. In Kyrygztsan, 82% said never/rarely while 10% said often/sometimes. In Afghanistan, 58% said never/rarely and 39% often/sometimes. In Morocco, 74% said never/sometimes and 9% said often/sometimes.

A 2014 Pew poll showed that support for suicide bombings had fallen to a great degree in Muslim-majority nations over the last decade:

- (46 vs 45) In Lebanon, 45% it could never justified, 25% rarely and 29% said often/sometimes.
- (59 vs 38) In Egypt, 38% said it could never be justified, 35% rarely while 24% said often/sometimes.
- (29 vs 58) In Turkey, 58% said never, 11% rarely while 18% said often/sometimes.
- (44 vs 55) In Jordan, 55% said never, 29% rarely while 15% said often/sometimes.
- (8 vs 90) In Tunisia, 90% said never, 3% rarely while 5% said often/sometimes.
- (61 vs 33) In Bangladesh, 33% said never, 14% rarely and 47% said often/sometimes.
- (33 vs 60) In Malaysia, 60% said never, 15% rarely and 18% often/sometimes.
- (22 vs 76) In Indonesia, 76% said never, 13% rarely and 9% often/sometimes.
- (7 vs 83) In Pakistan, 83% said never, 4% rarely and 3% often/sometimes.
- (34 vs 60) In Nigeria, 60% said never, 15% rarely and 19% often/sometimes.
- (31 vs 56) In Senegal, 56% said never, 16% rarely and 15% often/sometimes.

In mostly non-Muslim nations:

- (45 vs 50) In Tanzania, 50% said never, 19% said rarely and 26% said often/sometimes.
- (46 vs 48) In Israel, 48% said never, 30% rarely and 16% said often/sometimes.

== Western perspectives ==
Michael Scott Doran wrote in the journal Foreign Affairs that Islam seemed to be polarised between pro-Western and pro-jihadi mentalities, enabling a clear divide between opponents and proponents of violent action. The International Crisis Group wrote in their 2005 report Understanding Islamism that Islamic ideological and political spectrums were far more diverse than this idea suggests. American policy is unpopular among some Muslims, the report argued, yet this hostility did not directly translate to support for or participation in global jihad, and for political Islamists who support non-violent measures it could not be assumed that they are in agreement with Western agendas. Researchers have studied the condemnation of terrorism by European Muslim representatives, committees, and umbrella organizations, but also the everyday resistance to violent extremism in various Muslim communities.

== See also ==
- Muslims Condemn, a project documenting instances of Muslims condemning terrorism
- Islamic terrorism
- Definition of terrorism
- Peace movement
- Fasad
- Political aspects of Islam
