= Cryptologic technician =

Job specialty in the US Navy

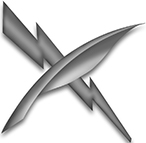
- Rating insignia
- Issued by: United States Navy
- Type: Enlisted rating
- Abbreviation: CT
- Specialty: Technical

Cryptologic technician (CT) is a United States Navy enlisted rating or job specialty. The CT community performs a wide range of tasks in support of the national intelligence-gathering effort, with an emphasis on cryptology and signal intelligence related products.

Most CT personnel are required to obtain and maintain security clearances. Due to the highly classified and secure work environment requiring very restricted access, it is not always possible to share resources with other commands. The majority of details within the CT work environment require dedicated technicians with appropriate security clearances (this accounts for the many branches of the CT rating, i.e. CTI, CTM, CTO, CTR, CTT, CWT). The contribution of an individual CT will depend upon the branch or career area.

Cryptologic technicians engage in wide ranges of career and training options, serving ashore, afloat, or in an airborne capacity. CT sailors may serve on overseas assignments of lengthy duration, or may never travel overseas.

== Ratings ==
- Interpretive (CTI) – Naval linguists, who specialize in analysis of adversary developments, radiotelephone communications, and preparation of statistical studies and technical reports requiring knowledge of a foreign language.
- Maintenance (CTM) – the installation, configuration, diagnosis, and repair of state-of-the-art electronic, computer, and network hardware and software systems.
- Collection (CTR) – perform a variety of duties worldwide at numerous overseas and stateside shore commands, aboard surface ships, aircraft, submarines, and Naval Special Warfare. Duties include performing collection, analysis, and reporting on communication signals using computers, specialized computer-assisted communications equipment, video display terminals, and electronic/magnetic tape recorders.
  - Synonymous with US Army job specialty 35S (signals collection analyst) and US Marine MOS 2621 (special communications signals collection operator)
- Technical (CTT) – perform a variety of specialized duties associated with the collection and processing of airborne, shipborne, and land-based radar signals. They operate electronic intelligence receiving and direction finding systems, digital recording devices, analysis terminals, and associated computer equipment. Systems they operate produce high-power jamming signals used to deceive electronic sensors and defeat radar guided weapons systems. Additionally, intelligence derived from collection and processing update national databases which are crucial to tactical and strategic units throughout the world. Non-communications signals intelligence (ELINT), electronic warfare support (ES), electronic attack (EA), electronic protect (EP), anti-ship missile defense (ASMD), while a portion perform servicing and maintenance of various related electronic countermeasures systems (i.e., AN/SLQ-32) They can hold Navy Enlisted Classification such as 1702, 1733, 1734, 1736, 1737 which are primarily for the AN/SLQ-32, 8201, 8295, 8296 which are for Naval Aircrewman, 9135 for Subsurface, 1781 advanced apps, and also the 9141,9102 NEC's.
- Cyber Warfare Technician (CTN 2004–2023) (CWT) – perform a variety of duties associated with computer network operations across global networks. A combination of technical and analytical computer network skills provides the situational awareness required to plan and execute information operations (IO) actions/ counteractions. Initially established as CTN, the rating was replaced by CWT (Cyber Warfare Technician) in 2023.

== Former ratings ==
- Administration (CTA) – Administrative and clerical duties that control access to classified material such as special security officer (SSO) or Defense Courier Service (DCS). (No longer active.)

== Rating changes ==
- 1942-43 specialists (Q) (CR) cryptographers, established 1942-1943, changed to CT in 1948
- 1948 Communications technician – Established 1948 from the ratings of specialist (Q) (cryptographers), specialist (Q) (radio intelligence), specialist (Q) (technicians), and radioman
- 26 March 1976, Communications technician renamed to cryptologic technician (name alignment w/officer community). Establishes CTT, CTR, CTO, CTI, CTA, CTM ratings.
- On October 1, 2003, Electronic warfare technicians (EW) were merged with CTT.
- On October 1, 2007, CTA merged with yeoman (YN), and legalman.
- Cryptologic Technician Communications (CTO) cross-rated to CTN and the legacy CTOs merged with information systems technician (IT).
- CTM were scheduled to be disestablished in 2008, with certain skill sets converting to electronics technician (ET) and information systems technician (IT) billets, but this has been set on hold for further planning.
- The CTN rating was disestablished in 2023, replaced by Cyber Warfare Technician (CWT).

== Notable cryptologic technicians ==
- CTICS Shannon M. Kent
- MCPO Tony Gonzales, U.S. Representative (2021-2026)

== See also ==
- Defense Language Aptitude Battery (The test taken to become a CTI)
- Defense Language Proficiency Tests (The tests taken to assess the skill level of CTIs)
- List of United States Navy ratings
