= List of books about al-Qaeda =

This is an incomplete list of books about al-Qaeda.

- Ahmed, Nafeez Mosaddeq (2005). The War on Truth: 9/11, Disinformation, and the Anatomy of Terrorism. Olive Branch Press. ISBN 1-56656-596-0.
- Alexander, Yonah; Swetnam, Michael S. (2001). Usama bin Laden's al-Qaida: Profile of a Terrorist Network. Transnational Publishers, Incorporated. ISBN 1-57105-219-4.
- Bell, J. Bowyer (2002). Murders on the Nile: The World Trade Center and Global Terror (1st ed.). Encounter Books. ISBN 1-893554-63-5.
- Bergen, Peter (2002). Holy War, Inc.: Inside the Secret World of Osama bin Laden. Free Press. ISBN 0743234952.
- Bergen, Peter (2006). The Osama bin Laden I Know: An Oral History of Al-Qaeda's Leader. Free Press. ISBN 0743278925.
- Bergen, Peter (2011). The Longest War: The Enduring Conflict between America and Al-Qaeda. Free Press. ISBN 978-0743278942.
- Bergen, Peter (2012). Manhunt: The Ten-Year Search for Bin Laden--from 9/11 to Abbottabad. Crown. ISBN 978-0307955579.
- Bodansky, Yossef (1999). Bin Laden: The Man Who Declared War on America. Random House. ISBN 0-7615-1968-8.
- Burke, Jason (2004). Al-Qaeda: Casting a Shadow of Terror. I. B. Tauris. ISBN 1-85043-396-8.
- Clark, Howard (2009). How You Can Kill Al Qaeda (In 3 Easy Steps). Light of New Orleans Publishing. ISBN 978-0-9714076-5-7.
- Coll, Steve (2004). Ghost Wars: The Secret History of the CIA, Afghanistan and Bin Laden, from the Soviet Invasion to September 10, 2001. Penguin Press. ISBN 978-1-594-20007-6.
- Cooley, John K. (1999). Unholy Wars: Afghanistan, America and International Terrorism. Pluto Press. ISBN 978-0-745-31917-9.
- Corbin, Jane (2003). Al-Qaeda: In Search of the Terror Network that Threatens the World. Nation Books. ISBN 1-56025-523-4.
- Curtis, Mark (2010). Secret Affairs: Britain's Collusion with Radical Islam. Serpent's Tail. ISBN 978-1846687631.
- Devji, Faisal (2005). Landscapes of the Jihad: Militancy, Morality, Modernity. Cornell University Press. ISBN 0-8014-4437-3.
- Dreyfuss, Robert (2006). Devil's Game: How the United States Helped Unleash Fundamentalist Islam. Dell Publishing. ISBN 0-8050-8137-2.
- Friedman, George (2005). America's Secret War: Inside the Hidden Worldwide Struggle Between the United States and Its Enemies (reprint ed.). Broadway. ISBN 0-7679-1785-5.
- Gerges, Fawaz A. (2005). The Far Enemy: Why Jihad Went Global. Cambridge University Press. ISBN 0-521-79140-5.
- Gerges, Fawaz A. (2006). Journey of the Jihadist: Inside Muslim Militancy. Harcourt. ISBN 0-15-101213-X.
- Gunaratna, Rohan (2003). Inside Al-Qaeda: Global Network of Terror. Berkeley Trade. ISBN 978-0-425-19114-9.
- Habeck, Mary (2006). Knowing the Enemy: Jihadist Ideology and the War on Terror. Yale University Press. ISBN 0-300-11306-4.
- Hamud, Randall B. (2005). Osama Bin Laden: America's Enemy in His Own Words (1st ed.). Nadeem Publishing. ISBN 0-9770935-0-6.
- Johnson, Ian (2010). A Mosque in Munich: Nazis, the CIA, and the Muslim Brotherhood in the West. Houghton Mifflin Harcourt. ISBN 978-0547488684.
- Keenan, Jeremy (2009). The Dark Sahara: America's War on Terror in Africa. Pluto Press. ISBN 0745324533.
- Kepel, Gilles (2004). Jihad: The Trail of Political Islam. I. B. Tauris. ISBN 1-85043-722-X.
- Labévière, Richard (1999). Dollars for Terror: The United States and Islam. Éditions Bernard Grasset. ISBN 1-892941-06-6.
- Lahoud, Nelly (2022). The Bin Laden Papers: How the Abbottabad Raid Revealed the Truth About al-Qaeda, Its Leader and His Family. New Haven, CT: Yale University Press. ISBN 978-0-300-26063-2. OCLC 1310854369.
- Lance, Peter (2004). 1000 Years for Revenge: International Terrorism and the FBI - The Untold Story. Regan. ISBN 978-0-0605-4354-9.
- Lance, Peter (2006). Triple Cross: How bin Laden’s Master Spy Penetrated the CIA, the Green Berets, and the FBI. Regan. ISBN 978-0-0608-8688-2.
- Maiya, Harish (2009). Developed Minds, Developing Minds and the Stupid Terrorists. BookSurge. ISBN 978-1-4392-6578-9.
- Malik, S. K. (1986). The Quranic Concept of War (PDF). Himalayan Books. ISBN 81-7002-020-4.
- Mamdani, Mahmood (2004). Good Muslim, Bad Muslim: America, the Cold War, and the Roots of Terror. Pantheon. ISBN 0-375-42285-4.
- Mura, Andrea (2015). The Symbolic Scenarios of Islamism: A Study in Islamic Political Thought. London: Routledge.
- Nance, Malcolm (2016). Defeating ISIS: Who They Are, How They Fight, What They Believe. Skyhorse Publishing. ISBN 978-1510711846.
- Nance, Malcolm (2014). The Terrorists of Iraq: Inside the Strategy and Tactics of the Iraq Insurgency 2003–2014. CRC Press. ISBN 978-1-498-70689-6.
- Nasiri, Omar (2008). Inside the Jihad: My Life with al Qaeda, a Spy's story. Basic Books. ISBN 978-0-465-02389-9.
- Ould Mohamedou, Mohamed Mahmoud (2007). Understanding Al Qaeda: The Transformation of War. Pluto Press. ISBN 978-0-7453-2592-7.
- Peters, Gretchen (2009). Seeds of Terror: How Heroin is Bankrolling the Taliban and Al Qaeda. Thomas Dunne Books.
- Phillips, Melanie (2006). Londonistan: How Britain is Creating a Terror State Within. Encounter books. ISBN 1-59403-144-4.
- Randal, Jonathan (2004). Osama: The Making of a Terrorist. Alfred A. Knopf. ISBN 978-0375708237.
- Reeve, Simon (1998). The New Jackals: Ramzi Yousef, Osama bin Laden and the Future of Terrorism. Andre Deutsch. ISBN 1-55553-509-7.
- Reynalds, Jermey (October 2007). War of the Web: Fighting the Online Jihad. World Ahead Publishing. ISBN 978-0-9746701-7-1.
- Roy, Olivier (2004). Globalized Islam: The Search for a New Ummah. Columbia University Press. ISBN 0-231-13498-3.
- Rubin, Barnett R.. The Fragmentation of Afghanistan: state formation and collapse in the international system. Pakistan, Yale University Press, 1995.
- Sageman, Marc (2004). Understanding Terror Networks. University of Pennsylvania Press. ISBN 0-8122-3808-7.
- Sasson, Jean (2009). Growing Up Bin Laden: Osama's Wife and Son Take Us Inside Their Secret World. St. Martin's Press. ISBN 978-0-312-56016-4.
- Scheuer, Michael (2006). Through Our Enemies' Eyes: Osama bin Laden, Radical Islam, and the Future of America (revised ed.). Potomac Books. ISBN 1-57488-967-2.
- Scott, Peter Dale (2008). The Road to 9/11: Wealth, Empire, and the Future of America. University of California Press. ISBN 978-0-520-25871-6.
- Smucker, Philip (2004). Al Qaeda's Great Escape: The Military and the Media on Terror's Trail. Potomac Books. ISBN 1-57488-628-2.
- Thompson, Paul (2004). The Terror Timeline: Year by Year, Day by Day, Minute by Minute: A Comprehensive Chronicle of the Road to 9/11 — and America's Response. ReganBooks. ISBN 978-0-060-78338-9.
- Trifkovic, Serge (2006). Defeating Jihad. Regina Orthodox Press, USA. ISBN 1-928653-26-X.
- Whelan, Richard (2005). Al-Qaedaism: The Threat to Islam, the Threat to the World (1st ed.). Ashfield Press. ISBN 1-901658-54-6.
- Williams, Paul L. (2002). Al Qaeda: Brotherhood of Terror (1st ed.). Alpha. ISBN 0-02-864352-6.
- Williams, Paul L. (2005). The Al Qaeda Connection: International Terrorism, Organized Crime, And the Coming Apocalypse. Prometheus Books. ISBN 1-59102-349-1.
- Wright, Lawrence (2006). The Looming Tower: Al-Qaeda and the Road to 9/11. Alfred A. Knopf. ISBN 978-0-375-41486-2.
