= Kathleen Christison =

American political analyst and author

- Occupations: Political analyst, author

Kathleen (McGrath) Christison (born 1941) is an American political analyst and author whose primary area of focus is the Israeli–Palestinian conflict.

For sixteen years, Christison worked as a political analyst for the Central Intelligence Agency (CIA). Between 1963 and 1972, her work concentrated on Vietnam. The last seven years before her resignation from the agency in 1979 saw her work there centered on the Middle East; and according to Robert Dreyfuss's 2005 book Devil's Game: How The United States Helped Unleash Fundamentalist Islam (p. 160), "Kathy Christison ... headed the CIA's Egypt desk from 1973 to 1977." Since leaving the CIA, Christison has worked as a free-lance author. She and her husband, Bill Christison, have gained recognition as vocal critics of Israel. Her articles have been published extensively by the Journal of Palestine Studies as well as in the Electronic Intifada and Adbusters. She is also the author of two books: Perceptions of Palestine: Their Influence on U.S. Middle East Policy (1999 & 2001) and The Wound of Dispossession: Telling the Palestinian Story (2002).

== Philosophical bases ==
Christison has described the ideological shift she made from "Reagan Republican" to foreign-policy critic as "a slow evolution" that was facilitated by the move she and her husband made away from Washington, D.C. to New Mexico.

In her book, Perceptions of Palestine, Christison examines how perceptions, attitudes, and policies of the United States government towards the Palestinians and Israel over the last century have contributed to the irresolution of the conflict. The United States' special relationship with Israel is said by Christison to have undermined Palestinian political claims and downplayed the seriousness of their tragedy. According to the Arab Studies Quarterly, the questioning of this lack of moral equality in American responses and treatments of both Arab and Jewish tragedies is a major theme of Christison's book.

== Statements on Israel and the "Israel Lobby" ==
At a panel discussion on the Palestine Papers, held in February 2011 at the University of London, Christison stated that: "I have nothing against Jews, but I want the dismantlement of Israel as a Jewish state. The only way to get there is to talk about it. Nobody imagined apartheid would end either. What happened in those instances should be a model for a Jewish exclusivist government."

At a conference entitled "I Am My Brother's Keeper: Confronting Islamophobia" held at St. Mark's Episcopal Cathedral, Seattle on May 6–7, 2011, Christison stated that "The discourse in this country at the moment is very Islamophobic" and that the "anti-Muslim discourse," is driven by "pressure from the pro-Israel lobby and Islamophobia lobby." She further stated that "Politicians are all afraid of opposing Israel publicly for fear of losing campaign funds." She also stated that "All of the major groups who are involved in promoting Islamophobia are interlinked in many cases; they are the same people in one group or another. They are Christian fundamentalists, Christian Zionists, Tea Partiers, Israeli supporters, and a lot of this Islamophobia comes from Israel but it also comes from Israeli supporters."

Regarding the relative calm in Israel during the previous few years, Christison stated that

The problem is that Israel has peace right now – there is very little terrorism and has been very little terrorism for several years ... What we need to fight for is justice, not peace ... Peace is a benefit to the powerful – it allows the powerful to continue to oppress the powerless ... Justice gives the powerless some kind of voice in resisting – hopefully not violently – the oppression under which they are."

== Works ==
=== Books ===
- Perceptions of Palestine: Their Influence on U.S. Middle East Policy (Hardcover 1999) University of California Press. ISBN 0-520-21717-9. Book review. (Updated softcover version released in 2001)
- The Wound of Dispossession: Telling the Palestinian Story (2002) Sunlit Hills Press. ISBN 0-9712548-0-X.

=== Articles in the Journal of Palestine Studies ===
- "The American Experience: Palestinians in the US" (1989)
- "Dilemmas of Arab Christianity" (1992)
- "Macro Microcosm" (1992)
- "The City and Its People" (1993)
- "Pax Americana" (1995)
- "A Frank Examination" (1995)
- "Uneven but Invaluable" (1996)
- "US Policy and the Palestinians: Bound by a Frame of Reference" (1997)
- "US Policy Realities" (1997)
- "A Morality Tale?" (1998)
- "Selective Memory?" (1999)
- "'All Those Old Issues': George W. Bush and the Palestinian-Israeli Conflict" (2004)
