= Hadith of Najd =

Hadith in Sahih Bukhari

The Hadith of Najd is a hadith in Sahih Bukhari with several chains of narration about three geographical locations, one of which is prophesied to be the source of calamities. Sunni Muslims accept the classification of this hadith as "sahih" (authentic).

== Text of the hadith ==
According to two narrations in Sahih Bukhari, the Islamic prophet Muhammad asks Allah to bless the areas of Bilad al-Sham (Syria) and Yemen. When his companions said "Our Najd as well," he replied: There will appear earthquakes and afflictions, and from there will come out the side of the head (i.e. horns) of Satan. In a similar narration, Muhammad again asked Allah to bless the areas Medina, Mecca, Shaam, and Yemen and, when asked specifically to bless Najd, repeated similar comments about there being earthquakes, trials, tribulations, and the horns of Satan.

"O Allah, bestow your blessings on our Shaam. O Allah, bestow your blessings on our Yemen." The people said, "O Messenger of Allah, and our Najd." I think the third time the Prophet, sallallaahu alayhi wa sallam, said, "There (in Najd) will occur earthquakes, trials and tribulations, and from there appears the Horn of Satan."

It has been asserted that this hadith is relating the coming events that shook the Muslim nation, these known as fitnah or 'trials'. There have also been various theories instigated against the people of the modern day region of Saudi Arabia known as 'Najd', however, linguistically and geographically this argument is disputed.

== Location of Najd ==
The Arabic word Najd generally means a highland. It can also refer, as a proper noun, to the region of Najd in Saudi Arabia. Some medieval Islamic scholars, who lived before the Wahhabi movement originating in the 18th century CE, wrote different interpretations of what this hadith could be referring to. Contemporarily, this hadith is widely understood to refer to the Wahhabi movement. Some scholars dispute this claim. Possible locations listed are the areas around Yemen, Iraq, and Saudi Arabia. Ibn Hajar al-Asqalani said after quoting the words of al-Khattabi explaining the meaning of Qarn (horn):

- "and others have said that the People of the East were disbelievers at that time and the Messenger of Allah, sallallaahu alayhi wa sallam, informed us that the trials and tribulations would arise from that direction and it was as he said. And the first of the trials that arose, arose from the direction of the east and they were the reason for the splitting of the Muslim ranks, and this is what Satan loves and delights in. Likewise, the innovations appeared from that direction."

Ibn Hajr quoted al-Khattabi as saying:

- "The najd is in the direction of the east, and for the one who is in Madinah then his Najd would be the desert of Iraq and its regions for this is to the east of the People of Madinah. The basic meaning of Najd is that which is raised/elevated from the earth in contravention to al-Gawr for that is what is lower than it. Tihamah [the coastal plain along the south-western and southern shores of the Arabian Peninsula] is entirely al-Gawr and Mecca is in Tihamah.'[...] by this [saying of al-Khattabi] the weakness of the saying of ad-Dawudi is understood that 'Najd is in the direction of Iraq' [min Nahiya al-Iraq] for he suggests that Najd is a specific place. This is not the case, rather everything that is elevated with respect to what adjoins it is called Najd and the lower area called Gawr."

The celebrated 12th-century historian Ali ibn al-Athir, who had frequently traveled to Iraq during the era of Saladin and had written his monumental work al-Kamil fi at-Tarikh (The Complete History), writes in his work 'al-Nihâyah':

- "Najd is the highland region. This name is given to area beyond the Hijâz towards Iraq".

It is also related that Imam Nawawi in his Sharh Saheeh Muslim 2/29 stated that this hadith had to do with the Dajjal or Antichrist coming from the East. This would show that these hadith were not understood as referring to Najd only, as Dajjal is said to come from Iran and Khorasan in hadiths.

=== Contemporary theories ===
Some Sunni Scholars view

A number of authors have said that the hadith refers to Muhammad ibn Abd al-Wahhab, the patronym of the Wahhabi movement. It is accounted that the origin of Muhammad ibn Abd al-Wahhab is from the modern day Najd region of Saudi Arabia which happens to be the only surviving region that carried on the title of 'Najd' after the geographical codification regardless that there were several distinct locations known previously as 'Najd'. This theory is generally accepted by scholars from the Sunni movement and reputed Al-Azhar University scholars, they identified Wahhabism as the predicted "Horn of the Devil", or the Islamic Dajjal.

Other evidence can be cited from a number of hadiths that identify the limits miqat for Hajj and Umrah pilgrims. In a hadith narrated in Al-Nasa'i (Manasik al-Hajj, 22), Aisyah narrates that the Messenger of Allah established miqat for pilgrims from Medina at Dzulhulaifah, for pilgrims from Syria and Egypt at Juhfah, for pilgrims from Iraq at Dzat Irq, pilgrims from Najd at Qarnul-Manazil, as well as pilgrims from Yemen in Yalamlam. Imam Muslim also narrated a similar history: "For the congregation from Medina in Dzulhulaifah – while from a different route it was in Juhfah – for the Iraqi congregation Dzat Irq, for the Najd congregation in Qarnul-Manazil, and the Yemeni congregation in Yalamlam." This text is proof that the Prophet differentiated between Najd and Iraq, so that he chose two different miqat locations for each population. Thus it can be explained that Najd is not included in Iraq.

It was narrated that 'Aishah said: "The Messenger of Allah designated Dhul-Hulaifah as the Miqat for the people of Al-Madinah, Al-Juhfah for the people Ash-sham and Egypt, Dhat 'Irq for the people Al-'Iraq, Qarn for the people of Najd and Yalamlam for the people of Yemen."

Ibn 'Abd al-Barr (368h-463h) was quoted as saying: "Allah knows best that the reason behind pointing of Prophet peace be upon him towards east regarding fitna is that the biggest fitna which was the key of troubles was the martyrdom of Uthman ibn Affan may Allah be pleased with him, and that was the reason behind the war of Jamal and Siffeen, these troubles started from the east. Then Khawarij emerged from the land of Najd, Iraq and its regions."

Musaylima was a self-proclaimed prophet from Najd and an opponent of Islam in 7th century Arabia who participated in the Ridda Wars against the caliph Abu Bakr. Most of the battles of the ridda wars occurred in Najd. Meanwhile, The Khawarij initially appeared from Southern Iraq and their movement was based there.

==== Wahhabi view ====
Contrary, advocates of Wahhabism consider the Banu Tamim tribe of Muhammad ibn Abd al-Wahhab, in the present-day Saudi Arabia, as the only one, who will resist the Dajjal, citing certain scholarly works, such as the Musnad of Ahmad ibn Hanbal: "Do not say of Banu Tamim anything but good, for indeed they are the severest of people in attacking the Dajjaal." Further, Ibn Hajar praises the Banu Tamim in his Tafsir of this hadith.

The Wahhabis also argue that quotes from the likes of Ibn 'Abd al-Barr and Imam Nawawi use the hadith to condemn other eastern regions like Iraq and mention the Khawarij emerging from there. The Dajjal is also said to emerge from the east. So it is clear that this hadith was not specifically used for the Najd region in modern day Saudi Arabia according to scholars.

== See also ==
- Invasion of Najd
- Memoirs of Mr. Hempher, The British Spy to the Middle East
- Fitnat al-Wahhabiyya
