= The Will of Peter the Great =

Political forgery

The Will of Peter the Great, a political forgery, purported to express the geopolitical testament of Emperor Peter I of Russia (r. 1682–1725), which allegedly contained a plan for the subjugation of Europe. For many years it influenced political attitudes in Great Britain and France towards the Russian Empire.

Forged at the beginning of 19th century, it resurfaced during the Crimean War of 1853–1856, during the Russo-Turkish War of 1877–1878, during World War I (1914–1918) and in the immediate post-World War II period.

== History ==
In 1744, Russian chancellor Alexey Bestuzhev-Ryumin called his foreign policy doctrine "The System of Peter the Great" (Sistema Petra Velikogo). To give it more weight and in the hope of gaining the support of Empress Elizabeth, Peter the Great's daughter, he gave it the name of the emperor who had died almost twenty years before. Bestuzhev-Ryumin considered the goal of Russian foreign policy to be dominance over Europe. To achieve this goal, he hoped to use the favorable international conjuncture of his time. In particular, he proposed to rely on an alliance with the "maritime" states, Britain and the Netherlands, to maintain friendly relations with Austria in opposition to Prussia and strengthen control over the Polish-Lithuanian Commonwealth.

In 1797, the Polish nobleman Michał Sokolnicki presented the French Directory with a document entitled "Aperçu sur la Russie". This became known as the so-called "Testament of Peter the Great", which Napoleon Bonaparte used for anti-Russian propaganda purposes in 1812, and has been widely publicised since, although scholars have since established that the document is a forgery.

In 1812, Charles-Louis Lesur wrote, under Napoleon's command, a memoir Des Progrès de la puissance russe depuis son origine jusqu'au commencement du XIXe siècle ("Progress of the Russian Power, from Its Origin to the Beginning of the Nineteenth Century"), in which a summary of the alleged Will was inserted. The memoir intended to justify Napoleon's war plans against Russia.

Walter K. Kelly in his History of Russia (1854) quotes The Will from Frederic Gaillardet's Mémoires du Chevalier d'Éon (1836). Gaillardet claimed that this document was stolen from Russia by d'Éon. While questioning its authenticity, Kelly comments that the document fairly reflects the politics of Russia in the past 100 years. The same was noted by Russian historian Sergey Shubinsky, who commented that the first 11 points of The Will is a fair recapitulation of Russian foreign policy since Peter's death (1725) until 1812.

Karl Marx, writing in David Urquhart's The Free Press in 1857 was also in agreement. Marx wrote that "Peter the Great is indeed the inventor of modern Russian policy, but he became so only by divesting the old Muscovite method... generalizing its purpose, and exalting its object from the overthrow of certain given limits of power to the aspiration of unlimited power." In a speech in 1867, Marx stated that "the policy of Russia is changeless... the polar star of its policy – world domination – is a fixed star." Marx continued, "Peter the Great touched this weak point when he wrote that in order to conquer the world, the Muscovites needed only souls."

In 1912, Polish historian Michel Sokolnicki (Michał Sokolnicki) found in archives of French Ministry of Foreign Affairs a 1797 memorandum "Aperçu sur la Russie of his ancestor, general Michał Sokolnicki and wrote a journal article "Le Testament de Pierre le Grand: Origines d'un prétendu document historique". General Sokolnicki claimed that he glimpsed a plan of Peter I to subjugate Europe in Russian archives and memorized major points. These points bear a remarkable similarity to those presented by Lesur, so it is quite possible that Lesur borrowed from Sokolnicky. Historian Sokolnicki also maintains that his ancestor did not invent The Will himself, but rather wrote down a long-existing Polish tradition.

== In fiction ==
From the speculative fiction novel The Third World War: The Untold Story by John Hackett:

Tsar Peter the Great in 1725, shortly after his annexation of five Persian provinces and the city of Baku, and just before he died, enjoined his successors thus: "I strongly believe that the State of Russia will be able to take the whole of Europe under its sovereignty… you must always expand towards the Baltic and the Black Sea.<...>" In 1985 Peter the Great, the mystical-absolutist, might have conceded, had he been aware of events, that the dialectical-materialist usurpers in the Kremlin were not doing so badly.

The purported testament is referenced in, and included as an appendix to, Constance (1982) by Lawrence Durrell, the third novel of The Avignon Quintet.

== See also ==
- Memoirs of Mr. Hempher, The British Spy to the Middle East
- War against Islam
- Fitnat al-Wahhabiyya
- Secret Affairs: Britain's Collusion with Radical Islam
