= Ahmad Zayni Dahlan =

Ottoman Grand Mufti of Mecca (1816–1886)

Ahmad Zayni Dahlan أحمد زَيْني دَحْلان
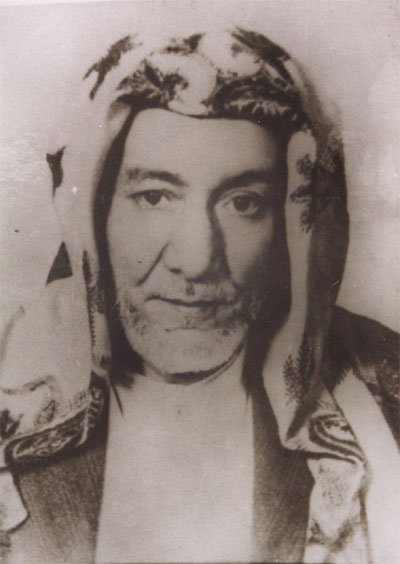
- Title: Shaykh al-Islam

Personal life
- Born: 1816 Mecca, Habesh Eyalet, Ottoman Empire
- Died: 1886 (aged 69–70) Medina, Hejaz Vilayet, Ottoman Empire
- Buried: Al-Baqi Cemetery
- Region: Hejaz
- Main interest(s): Sufism, History, Aqidah, Kalam (Islamic theology), Fiqh (Islamic jurisprudence), Usul al-Fiqh (principles of jurisprudence), Hadith, Tafsir, Tajwid, Syntax, Rhetoric, Algebra
- Notable work(s): Fitnat al-Wahhabiyyah, Al-Durar al-Saniyyah fi al-Radd 'ala al-Wahhabiyyah, Khulasat al-Kalam fi Bayan Umara' al-Balad al-Haram

Religious life
- Religion: Islam
- Denomination: Sunni
- Jurisprudence: Shafi'i
- Creed: Ash'ari

Muslim leader
- Influenced by: Al-Shafi'i Ahmad al-Marzuqi al-Maliki al-Makki
- Influenced: Khalil Ahmad Saharanpuri Hussein bin Ali, Sharif of Mecca Sheikh Mustafa Usman bin Yahya Arsyad Thawil al-Bantani Muhammad Amrullah Ahmed Raza Khan Barelvi

Ahmad Zayni Dahlan (Note: Arabic: أحمد زَيْني دَحْلان, romanized: ʾAḥmad Zaynī Daḥlān) (1816–1886) was an Islamic scholar who served as the Grand Mufti of Mecca between 1871 and his death. He also held the position of Shaykh al-Islam in the Hejaz and Imam of the Haramayn (imam of Mecca and Medina).

Theologically and juridically, he followed the Shafi'i school of jurisprudence and Ash'ari school of theology. He was known for his harsh criticism of Wahhabism, being one of their main adversaries, and his recognition of Sufi principles. A leader of the conservative faction among the Shafi'is, he was particularly important in Asia, where his influence grew with his many disciples.

He was the descendant of 'Abd al-Qadir al-Jilani. He authored, and personally published numerous works on history, fiqh, and the Islamic sciences in general. He taught to many Muslims scholars, including Hussein bin Ali, Sharif of Mecca and sometimes considered the last Caliph and many foreign Islamic scholars, like Arsyad Thawil al-Bantani and Khalil Ahmad Saharanpuri, a leading figure of the Deobandi movement, as well as Ahmad Raza Khan, the founder of the Barelvi movement.

He died in Medina in 1886.

== Biography ==
=== Birth and education ===
He was born in Mecca in 1816 or 1817. He was from a Sayyid family, and was a direct descendent of Muhammad in the 38th generation via Hasan ibn Ali. His father was called Zayni and his great-grandfather was Uthman Al-Dahlan Al-Jilani, hence his name. He is a descendant of 'Abd al-Qadir al-Jilani through his son Muhammad Al-Jalani (d. 1204).

He studied under Ahmad al-Marzuqi al-Maliki al-Makki (Arabic: أحمد المرزوقي المالكي المكي) and under Muhammad Sayyid Quds, the previous Shafi'i Mufti of Mecca, Abdullah Siraj al-Hanqi, Yusuf al-Sawy al-Masri al-Maliki, the Maliki Mufti of Mecca and Abd al-Rahman al-Jabarti.

After obtaining his degree in Islamic studies, he started to preach in Mecca.

== Lineage ==
His lineage is as follows;

Ahmad Zayni Dahlan, bin Zayni Al-Dahlan, bin Ahmad Al-Dahlan, bin Uthman Al-Dahlan Al-Jilani, bin Ni'matullah Al-Jilani, bin Abdul-Rahman Al-Jilani, bin Muhammad Al-Jilani, bin Abdullah Al-Jilani, bin Uthman Al-Jilani, bin Atiyyah Al-Jilani, bin Faris Al-Jilani, bin Mustafa Al-Jilani, bin Muhammad Al-Jilani, bin Ahmad Al-Jilani, bin Zayni Al-Jilani, bin Abdul-Qadir Al-Jilani, bin Abdul-Wahhab Al-Jilani, bin Muhammad Al-Jilani, bin Abdul-Razzaq Al-Jilani, bin Ali Al-Jilani, bin Ahmad Al-Jilani, bin Ahmad Al-Jilani, bin Muhammad Al-Jilani, bin Zakariyya Al-Jilani, bin Thaheer al-Din Yahya Al-Jilani, bin Muhammad Al-Jilani, bin 'Abd al-Qadir al-Jilani.

=== Subsequent life and teaching ===
Ahmad Zayni Dahlan is frequently considered as one of the most important religious figures of the Meccan landscape in the 19th century.

In 1848, he started to teach at the Masjid al-Haram. He was then named, in 1871, Sheikh al-Ulama, or Grand Mufti of Mecca.

He had many students. Among them were Hussein bin Ali, Sharif of Mecca who studied the Qur'an with him and completed its memorization, Ahmed Raza Khan Barelvi, Khalil Ahmad Saharanpuri, Sheikh Mustafa, Usman bin Yahya, Arsyad Thawil al-Bantani, Muhammad Amrullah, Sayyid Abi Bakr Syata, and Ahmad b. Hasan al-'Attas.

He also taught to Sayyid Fadl, while he was in Mecca before departing for Constantinople.

Dahlan issued numerous fatwas, including one approving the use of radiophonic devices for religious means or one approving the use of drums and music during religious days, which was an important concern for Muslims in Indonesia, considering that "it was acceptable if nothing unlawful happened."

He followed the Sharif Awn ar-Rafiq to Medina in 1885 after the Hashemite clashed with Osman Pasha. There, he died the next year after visiting the tomb of Muhammad. He was buried in the Al-Baqi Cemetery, where his tomb was destroyed by Saudi Arabia later, alongside the whole cemetery.

== Theology and thought ==
Joseph Schacht described him as the "solitary representative of historical writing in Mecca in the XIXth century".

=== Conservatism ===
Ahmad Zayni Dahlan was a leader for the conservative faction of the Shafi'i of his time. Because of his conservatism and traditional views, he had an echo in the Muslim world beyond the Shafi'is.

=== Sufism and Wahhabism ===
In his treatise against Wahhabi influence, he viewed Sufism as a legal and integral part of Islamic practice – including such aspects as Tawassul (intercession, or addressing God through an intermediary), (Note: Supplication to Allah by means of an intermediary, whether it be a living person, dead person, a good deed, or a name or Attribute of Allah.) Tabarruk (seeking blessings through persons or things), and Ziyarat al-Qubur (the visitation of tombs and graves).

Dahlan considered that Wahhabism would destroy the Ummah. Moreover, he called Muhammad ibn Abd al-Wahhab "malevolent" and compared his followers to the Kharijites. For Dahlan, he was a "deceiver" when he called himself an Hanbali. He also said that he was trying to divide the madhhabs by saying that one another were opposed between themselves.

The opposition to the Wahhabi movement seems to have been the opinion of the majority of Hejazi scholars and jurists of that time.

=== Opposition to Shia Islam ===
He wrote against Shia Islam and how to debate Shias. Similar to his vehement criticism of Wahhabism, he also targeted the Qarmatians, a radical Shiite movement that operated in the 10th century and attacked pilgrims traveling to Mecca for Hajj.

=== Anti-imperialism ===
He supported Muhammad Ahmad in the Mahdist War, seeing his fight against Khedive Tawfiq (1852–1892) and the British Empire as a bulkwark against Western imperialism.

He was also influential in supporting anti-imperialism in the Dutch East Indies (modern-day Indonesia) and more generally, in Southeast Asia.

== Posterity ==
He played a crucial role through his student, Ahmad Raza Khan Barelvi in the establishment of the Barelvi movement in India, Pakistan, Kashmir, Bangladesh and Afghanistan, exerting significant influence and contributing to their staunch opposition to Wahhabism.

His fatwas were recognized after his death and are particularly important in the shaping of Indonesian Islam. The Horn of Africa was also quite influenced by him, especially via the preaches of Abd al-Rahman al-Zayla'i, in Somalia. His influence was also central for the Swahili Muslims.

Since he attacked Wahhabism and clashed violently with them, some of his books are banned in Saudi Arabia.

== Works ==
His works are collectively known as the "Dahlaniya". He wrote and taught in an era when the first printing press came to Mecca, one of the concerns of Ahmad Zayni Dahlan was to be able to explain the text of the Quran in more simple ways, to be understood by everyone.

Explanation by Sayyid Ahmad Zayni Dahlan on the Ajurrumiyya where he discussed the Ajurrumiyya, a famous Arabic grammatical manual.

To fulfill this goal, he also wrote rhetoric manuals for young learners based on the Quran and treaties of mantiq. He was very interested in the metaphors used in the Quran.

Additionally, this helped Dahlan to disseminate his challenges to Salafism through his devoted students with more impact. He wrote, for instance, a booklet outlining the suffering Wahhabis brought to Mecca during their rule in the first quarter of the nineteenth century, Fitnat al-Wahhabiyyah (Arabic: فتنة الوهابية, lit. 'The Wahhabi Fitna'), and a study refuting the entire Wahhabi doctrine and practices, al-Durar al-Saniyyah fi al-Radd 'ala al-Wahhabiyyah (Arabic: الدرر السَنِيَّة فى الرد على الوهابية, lit. 'The Pure Pearls in Answering the Wahhabis').

Following is a list of some of his published works:

- Fitnat al-Wahhabiyyah (Arabic: فتنة الوهابية).
- Al-Durar al-Saniyyah fi al-Radd 'ala al-Wahhabiyyah (Arabic: الدرر السَنِيَّة فى الرد على الوهابية).
- Khulasat al-Kalam fi Bayan Umara' al-Balad al-Haram (Arabic: خلاصة الكلام في بيان أمراء البلد الحرام).
- Al-Futuhat al-Islamiyyah ba'da Mudhiy al-Futuhat al-Nabawiyyah (Arabic: الفتوحات الإسلامية بعد مضي الفتوحات النبوية).
- Sharh al-Ajurrumiyyah, by Ibn Ajurrum (Arabic: شرح الأجرومية).
- Sharh al-Alfiyyah, by Ibn Malik (Arabic: شرح الألفية).
- Tanbih al-Ghafilin, Mukhtasar Minhaj al-'Abidin, by al-Ghazali (Arabic: تنبيه الغافلين: مختصر منهاج العابدين).

== See also ==
- Sulayman ibn Abd al-Wahhab
- Muhammad al-'Arabi al-Tabbani
- Jamal ibn Abd Allah Shaykh Umar
- Malik R. Dahlan
- List of Muslim historians
- List of Sufis
- List of Ash'aris and Maturidis
- List of Muslim theologians
