= Secret Affairs: Britain's Collusion with Radical Islam =

Book by Mark Curtis

Secret Affairs
- Author: Mark Curtis
- Translator: Kamal al-Sayyid
- Language: English, Arabic
- Subject: International relations, politics, terrorism
- Publisher: Serpent's Tail, Egyptian National Center for Translation
- Publication date: First published in 2010 by Serpent's Tail, an imprint of Profile Books Ltd
- Publication place: United Kingdom
- Pages: 430
- ISBN: 9781846687631

Secret Affairs: Britain's Collusion With Radical Islam is a 2010 non-fiction book written by the British historian and journalist Mark Curtis which explores the United Kingdom's relationship with radical Islamism.

== Content ==
In the book, using declassified UK government documents, Curtis argues that the British state has supported Islamic extremists since the early 20th century to further their foreign policy goals in the Muslim world, claiming that Britain's policies in the region "have generally aimed at maintaining in power or installing governments that will promote Western-friendly oil policies."

Curtis writes that this relationship between the UK and radical Islam started as the British government looked for a way to counter the rise of nationalism in the Middle East and maintain Western dominance in the wider Muslim world, focusing on events such as the 1953 Iranian coup d'état, the unification of Saudi Arabia and the Free Aceh Movement-led insurgency in Indonesia. Secret Affairs also claims that British support in radical Islam is primarily rooted in Britain's relationship with the Saudi government, as Saudi Arabia is a primary purchaser of military equipment from UK-based weapons manufacturers; leading to the British state intentionally overlooking promotion of Islamic extremism in Britain by the Saudi government.

Claiming the British government supported various radical Islamic groups in Iran, Egypt, Afghanistan, Iraq, Libya, Syria, Indonesia and Bosnia, Curtis places these developments in a larger pattern of British foreign policy of self-interest in the Muslim world; citing the example of British attempts to cultivate a relationship with the Muslim Brotherhood in order to overthrow Egyptian political leader Gamal Abdel Nassar after he nationalized the Suez Canal (as a precursor to the Tripartite Aggression by the UK, France and Israel in 1956).

Curtis also focuses on a lack of media attention in the UK towards British foreign policy, citing British news coverage of Britain's support for Syrian opposition in the ongoing civil war in Syria as an example of "how poorly the mainstream media serves the public", stating in an interview with openDemocracy: "While large sections of the public are deluged with misreporting, disinformation or simply the absence of coverage of key policies, there may never be a critical mass of people prepared to take action in their own interests to bring about a wholly different foreign policy."

== Reception ==
In a review for Metro, Robert Murphy wrote that "Secret Affairs deserves to become a key reference point in the debate over terrorism and Middle East policy", though he criticized the "exclusive focus on Britain’s involvement [which] pushes the US’s larger role to one side."

The book was translated into Arabic by Kamal al-Sayyid and published in Cairo by the Egyptian National Center for Translation in 2012. Secret Affairs remained on the bestseller list in 2013.

== See also ==
- Unholy Wars
- The Grand Chessboard
- Memoirs of Mr. Hempher, The British Spy to the Middle East
- Devil's Game (book)
- The Israel Lobby and U.S. Foreign Policy
- Confessions of an Economic Hit Man
- The Shock Doctrine
- Fitnat al-Wahhabiyya
- List of books about al-Qaeda
- Declassified UK
