= Greater Central Asia =

Central Asia and nearby regions

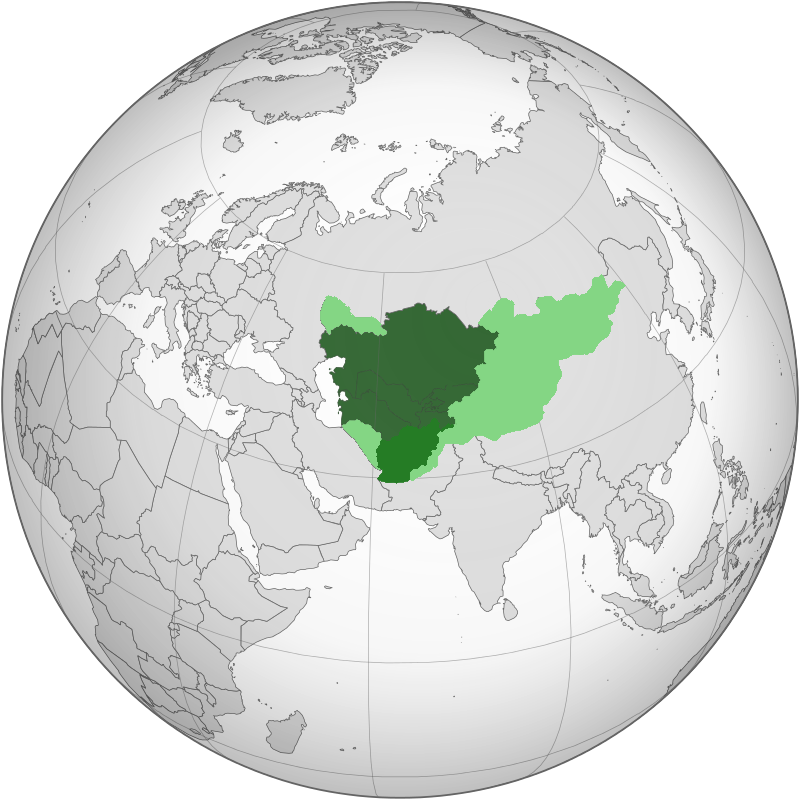
A depiction of Central Asia in dark-green along with some nearby associated regions in light-green.

Greater Central Asia (GCA) is a variously defined region encompassing the area in and around Central Asia, by one definition including Pakistan, Iran, Turkey, Xinjiang (in China), and Afghanistan, and by a more expansive definition, excluding Turkey but including Mongolia and parts of India and Russia. The region was historically interconnected religiously, economically, and otherwise, being important as part of the Silk Road trading network until the 15th century; the competition between Soviet, British, and Chinese spheres of influence split the region apart in the 20th century. In the 21st century, it has been contested by a number of major powers, such as the United States, China, and Russia.

The region is defined to a significant extent by its many tribal/clan alliances and histories.

== History ==
=== Ancient era ===
In ancient times, GCA was involved in the Silk Road, and was greatly influenced by Buddhism as it transmitted through the region to East Asia. The region was important in an intellectual sense, coming up with many new ideas and connecting the intellectual spheres of neighboring Eurasian regions. Alexander the Great's conquests throughout the region, culminating in northwest India, Hellenized the region and left Greek kingdoms such as the Greco-Bactrian Kingdom in their wake. The Kushan Empire was one of the first empires to unite most of GCA.

The Mongol conquest of Central Asia in the 13th century increased the economic connectivity of the region. The Islamization of GCA was ongoing during this time period; Arab conquests of the region from the 7th century onward had surpassed the conquests of the region from the previous millennium in bringing cultural and religious change, with the southern regions of GCA having converted to Islam within the first Islamic century, while the northern parts of Central Asia took closer to a millennium; Central Asia then went on to be a core contributor to the Islamic Golden Age. However, non-Muslim areas of GCA such as Mongolia still share common religious heritage with neighboring areas through elements such as Tengrism. Central Asian conquests of India in the first half of the second millennium, primarily by Timur and later Babur, then resulted in the spread of a Turco-Persian tradition throughout GCA and through northwestern South Asia into the rest of South Asia. By the 17th century, the importance of the Silk Road had declined due to the rise of maritime trade.

=== Modern era ===
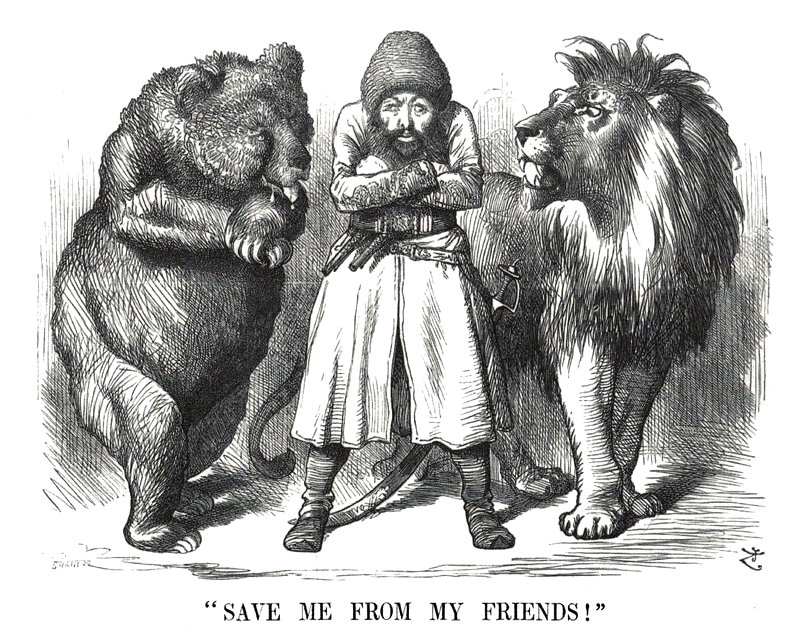
A depiction of Britain (the lion) and Russia (the bear) contesting Afghanistan (Sher Ali Khan).

The 18th- to mid 20th-century British rule of India disconnected South Asians from their centuries-long ties to GCA at the same time that the Soviet Union and Chinese Qing dynasty were conquering parts of the region. Afghanistan became a buffer state between the British Empire and the Soviet Union in what was referred to as the "Great Game". After India's independence in 1947, it was able to build closer ties with Soviet Central Asia as part of its overall close relations with the Soviet Union during the Cold War, in contrast to Pakistan.

The Soviet invasion of Afghanistan of the 1980s prompted a greater level of Western interest in the GCA concept, as a way of understanding contemporary events in the context of historical Eurasian geopolitics. By 1991, the Soviet Union had ended and the five modern Central Asian nations became independent.

Important events in the early 2020s, such as America's chaotic pullout from Afghanistan, along with Russia's full-scale invasion of Ukraine, have reduced Central Asia's chances of creating land routes to the sea for trade, and have created fears in the region of being invaded again.

China's involvement in GCA, involving over $100 billion in investment, is argued to be aimed towards the protection of its Xinjiang region from neighboring terrorist groups, as well as securing natural resources and curbing the local influence of America and India. India is interested in engaging with GCA, though its difficult relationship with Pakistan and the instability of Afghanistan reduce the potential for such engagement for the time being. India also lacks direct borders with Central Asia as well as the economic heft of being able to provide a Belt and Road Initiative-type project to the region that China has, which are factors that favor China's influence in the region.

== See also ==
- Geostrategy in Central Asia
- Soviet Central Asia
- Inner Asia
- Greater Iran
- Greater Khorasan
- Greater Middle East
- Turkestan
