= Thomas Obicini =

Italian Franciscan friar (1585–1632)

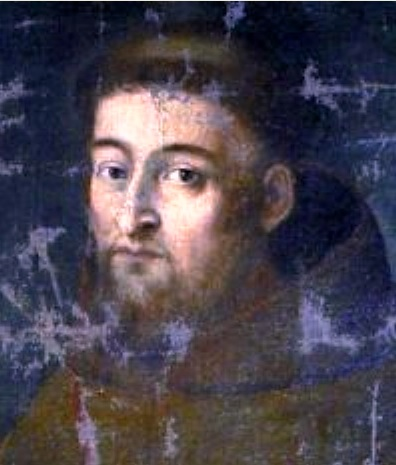
Tommaso Obicini of Novara (1585-1632)

Thomas Obicini of Novara (Italian: Tomasso Obicini da Novara; 1585 – 7 November 1632) was an Italian Franciscan friar, originally from Nonio, not far from Novara. As an early orientalist, Arabist and linguist, he translated Arabic texts into Latin and took possession of the Grotto of Nazareth for the Franciscan order in 1620.

== Journey to Nazareth ==
In 1620 Fra Obicini's travelled to Jerusalem to the Emir of Beirut, Fakhr ad-Din II.

The background to this mission began seven years earlier, in 1613, when Fakhr ad-Din II had taken refuge in Tuscany, Italy. The emir formed an alliance with the Medici ruler, Cosimo II, and spent two years under his protection. He spent three more in Sicily and Naples seeking, and failing, to rally a Crusade against Ottoman rule. By 1618 the changed political situation permitted his return to Lebanon.

Two years later Friar Obicini journeyed to Jerusalem in an embassy with Lord Battista Tarquet, the Consul of all Palestine, sent by the consul of Sidon, the Christian King, Lord Albert Gardana and the Prosecutor of the Holy Land, Lord Francis Lebar.

In Beirut, Obicini was, according to his account, warmly and lavishly received by the emir ad-Din, who had readily granted the two Christian holy sites, the Grotto of the Annunciation, i.e. the Grotto of Nazareth, and Mount Tabor to his Franciscan order.

In his description of the acquisition of the holy sites he recounts how he travelled to Nazareth, as a small group of priests, friar John of Vendôme, and a Sicilian friar, Francesco Salice, had brought letters from the Princes, various testimonials, and a decree from the Qadi of Safed. On Saturday 29 November 1620, the group took possession of the sanctuary built on the foundations of the House of Loreto and known as the Holy Grotto - the site venerated by Christians as the place where the Angel Gabriel announced the birth of Christ to the Virgin Mary.

While Obicini was abbot in the convent of Aleppo, Syria he had mastered Syriac, Arabic, Hebrew, Aramaic, and Coptic languages. In 1621, he was the first lector in Arabic in the San Pietro in Montorio convent and was a precursor of Athanasius Kircher.

In 1631 Obicini published Grammatica Arabica; a Latin translation of the 13th-14th century Arabic grammar Matn Al Ajrumiyyah, (إلاجرُومِية), by Abū Abdullaahi Muhammad bin Muhammad bin Dāwūd aṣ-Ṣanhaajī, known as Ibn Adjurrum.

In 1636 Obicini published Thesaurus Arabico-Syro-Latinus, his opus magnum; a Latin expanded translation of Elijah of Nisibis's 11th-century glossary intended to assist Latin-speaking prelates in converting Syrians and other Arabic speakers.

== Literature ==
- Thesaurus Arabico-Syro-Latinus by Thomas Obicinus; [edited by Dominicus Germanus], 1636. Downloadable at Archive.org.
- Mufadhdhal ibn 'Umar Al Abharí Īsāghūkhī, Isagoge. Id est, breve Introductorium Arabicum in Scientiam Logices [by Mufadhdhal ibn 'Umar Al Abharí]: cum versione latina: ac theses Sanctae Fidei. R. P. F. Thomae Novariensis [i.e. Thomas Obicini] ... opera studioque editae ... Quae quidem publice disputabuntur ... Objectis satisfaciente P. F. P. Marietta, etc., Thomas Obicini, 1625
- Obicini, Thomas, Grammatica Arabica. Agrumia appellata. Cum versione Latina, ac dilucida expositione. Rome, Congregatio de Propag. Fide, 1631 Downloadable at Archive.org
- Van Lantschoot, Arnold, Un précurseur d'Athanase Kircher : Thomas Obicini et la Scala Vat. copte 71, Louvain : Muséon, 1948 - XV, 87 p, (Bibliothèque du Muséon; 22)
