= Britons in the Israel Defense Forces =

Since the beginning of the Gaza War, over 2,000 British citizens have served in the Israel Defense Forces (IDF).

== Background ==
On 13 December 2023, Andrew Mitchell, Minister of State, confirmed in response to a Written Parliamentary Question that,

"We are aware of reports of UK citizens travelling to fight for the Israel Defence Force (IDF), but the Government does not estimate the numbers of those who have done so. The UK recognises the right of British nationals with additional nationalities to serve in the legitimately recognised armed forces of the country of their other nationalities. The IDF is a recognised armed force and British nationals are both able to volunteer into the IDF and eligible for national service. For Israel, one does not have to be Israeli to serve in the IDF."

In May 2025, Luke Pollard, then Parliamentary Under-Secretary of State for the Armed Forces wrote that "The UK recognises the right of British dual nationals to serve in the legitimately recognised armed forces of the country of their other nationality," adding that the Foreign Office does not keep track of dual British nationals serving in foreign armed forces.

== History ==
Prior to the founding of the State of Israel, British military officer John Henry Patterson and intelligence officer Orde Charles Wingate contributed to the establishment of the Israeli army between 1915 and 1939. Patterson led the Jewish Legion, described as the precursor to the IDF. Wingate was subsequently based in Jerusalem, where he oversaw the establishment of Special Night Squads during the nationalist Arab uprising. Both were subsequently referred to as the British "godfathers" of the Israeli army.

=== 2014 Gaza War ===
During the 2014 Gaza War, MP Grahame Morris asked British Prime Minister David Cameron if British citizens serving in the IDF would be treated like those who return from fighting with terrorists groups "given the strong evidence of Israeli war crimes in Gaza." Cameron replied, "I think that the Hon. Gentleman, when he looks at his words, will come to regret drawing a comparison between a soldier fighting in the Israel defense forces and a terrorist returning from Syria."

In March 2017, Sayeeda Warsi, former Conservative Party chairwoman, called on HM Government to close a loophole "designed to protect Israel," that differentiates between British citizens who fight for countries like Israel and those who fight for non-state actors.

=== 2023 Gaza War ===
In April 2025, the Gaza-based Palestinian Centre for Human Rights (PCHR) and the UK-based Public Interest Law Centre (PILC) submitted a 240-page report to the Metropolitan Police's War Crimes Team, accusing 10 British nationals of war crimes between October 2023 and May 2024, including "murder, forcible transfer of people, and attacks on humanitarian personnel."

On 11 September 2025, 3 MPs tabled an early day motion titled "Obligations under the Genocide Convention towards British dual nationals", urging HM Government to "deter British dual nationals from participating within institutions actively committing human rights violations".

In October 2025, the International Centre for Justice for Palestinians (ICJP) filed an application to a magistrates court for a summons against a named individual British citizen, alleging they had unlawfully went to fight for Israel. The complaint alleged that waging a war with a foreign armed force violated section 4 of the Foreign Enlistment Act 1870, which makes it an offense for any person to "accept or agree a commission or engagement in the military service of any foreign state at war with another foreign state that is at peace with the UK government."

In April 2026, the case was dismissed by Judge Paul Goldspring, describing the application as “an abuse of the process of the court, driven by an improper motive and facilitated by serious breaches of the duty of candour”.

In 2026, Israel NGO Hatzlacha using Israel's Freedom of Information Law obtained data that "1,686 soldiers in the military held dual British-Israeli citizenship, in addition to 383 other soldiers who held another passport in addition to their British and Israeli ones." Previous reports suggested approximately 50 Britons served during the conflict.

=== 2026 open letter and petition ===
In June 2026, Green Party leader Zack Polanski signed an open letter to Shabana Mahmood, the Home Secretary, and Yvette Cooper, the Foreign Secretary, urging HM Government to create a database of British-Israeli dual citizens who have served since the October 7th attacks. The letter, organized by organized by Declassified UK and the International Centre of Justice for Palestinians (ICJP), advocated for the Government to inplement airport disclosure mandates for IDF soldiers traveling to the UK from Israel.

The letter was also signed by Jeremy Corbyn, former Greek Finance Minister Yanis Varoufakis, independent MPs Shockat Adam, Ayoub Khan, Iqbal Mohamed and Zarah Sultana, and Labour MPs Brian Leishman and John McDonnell.

A petition with identical wording to the letter was signed by almost 15,000 people as of June 4, 2026.

The Board of Deputies of British Jews condemned the petition, calling it an "attempt to demonise Israelis and promote an atmosphere of intimidation against British Jews," adding it was a "wholly unacceptable form of discrimination".

== See also ==
- United Kingdom and the Gaza war
