= Jamal ibn Abd Allah Shaykh Umar =

Saudi Islamic scholar and teacher

Jamal Shaykh Umar
- جمال شيخ عمر

Hanafi Mufti of Mecca
- In office 1864/1865–1868
- Preceded by: Muhammad Husayn Kutubi
- Succeeded by: Abd ar-Rahman Siraj

Shaykh al-Ulama of Masjid al-Haram
- In office 1847/1848–1868
- Preceded by: Abd Allah Siraj
- Succeeded by: Ahmad Zayni Dahlan

Personal details
- Born: Mecca
- Died: 14 February 1868 Mecca
- Resting place: Jannat al-Mu'alla

Jamāl ibn ‘Abd Allāh Shaykh ‘Umar al-Ḥanafī al-Makkī (Arabic: جمال بن عبد الله شيخ عمر الحنفي المكي; d. 14 February 1868) (Note: Also known as Jamal ibn Abd Allah ibn Shaykh Umar, Jamal ibn Shaykh Umar, Jamal Shaykh Umar) was an Islamic scholar and teacher in the Masjid al-Haram who served as Shaykh al-Ulama from 1264 AH (1847/1848) and Hanafi Mufti of Mecca from 1281 AH (1864/1865), until his death in 1868.

== Life ==
Born in Mecca, he initially studied under Shaykh Siddiq Kamal. He attended the lessons of Allamah Umar Abd Rabb ar-Rasul and Allamah Sayyid Yahya al-Mu'adhdhin. He became a pupil of Shaykh Abd Allah Siraj and completed his studies under him. After the death of Siraj in 1264 AH (1864/1865) he was appointed to the post of Shaykh al-Ulama. He was appointed Mufti al-Ahnaf (Mufti of the Hanafis) after the death of Shaykh Muhammad Husayn Kutubi in 1281 AH (1847/1848).

His students included Shaykh Abd ar-Rahman Siraj, Shaykh Mirdad Abu al-Khayr, Shaykh Hasan Tayyib, Shaykh Abd al-Malik al-Fattani, Shaykh Abd ar-Rahman al-Ujaymi, Shaykh Sulayman Utbi, and Shaykh Abd al-Qadir Shams.

Shaykh Jamal died in Mecca on Friday, 19 Shawwal 1284 AH (14 February 1868), after sunrise. His funeral prayer was performed at the door of the Kaaba after Asr prayer. Sharif Abd Allah was in attendance. He was buried in the vicinity of the tomb of Khadijah in Jannat al-Mu'alla.

During the British Raj, the following Muftis (the persons who issue decrees on religious affairs, mostly appointed by the Government) of Mecca also issued decrees to the effect that going to war against the British Government in India by the Indian Muslims was not lawful. These Muftis are:

1. Jamal ibn Abd Allah Shaykh Umar.

2. Hussain bin Ibrahim Maliki.

3. Ahmad bin Zuhri Shafi’i.

Abd ar-Rahman Siraj succeeded him as Mufti and Ahmad Zayni Dahlan succeeded him as Shaykh al-Ulama.

His written works include:

- Risalah fi fada'il laylat an-nisf min Sha'ban
- Manaqib as-sadah al-Badriyin
- Manaqib Abd ar-Rahman ibn Abi Bakr as-Siddiq
- Manaqib Khalid ibn al-Walid
- al-Faraj ba'd ash-shiddah fi tarikh Jiddah
- al-Manhaj al-a'dal fi ba'd manaqib as-Sayyid 'Ali al-Ahdal
- Nur al-Jamal 'ala jawab as-su'al
