= Mustafa Waliullah =

Sri Lankan Sufi scholar and poet (1836–1888)

Sheikh Mustafa شيخ مصطفى செய்கு முஸ்தபா
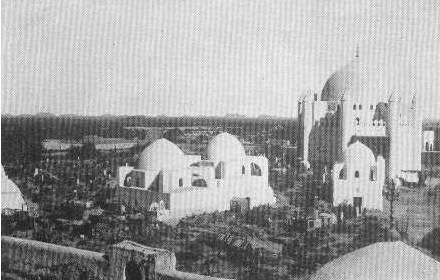

Personal life
- Born: 1836 Beruwala, British Ceylon
- Died: 25 July 1888 (aged 51–52) Makkah, Hejaz Vilayet, Ottoman Empire
- Resting place: Jannatul Mualla, Makkah
- Era: 19th century

Religious life
- Religion: Islam
- Denomination: Sunni (Sufism)
- Jurisprudence: Shafi
- Tariqa: Qadiriyathun Nabaviyyah
- Creed: Ash'ari

Muslim leader
- Successor: Sheikh Muhammad bin Mustafa
- Influenced by: Ahmed ibn Mubrak Mowlana, Shaykh Ahmad Zayni Dahlan
- Influenced: Sheikh Muhammad bin Mustafa, Sheikh Isameel Hajiar

Sheikh Mustafa (1836 – 25 July 1888), known as Sheikh Mustafa Waliullah (Tamil: அஷ் செய்கு முஸ்தபா(வலியுல்லாஹ்) இப்னு பாவா ஆதம்) was an Islamic scholar from Sri Lanka. He was also a poet and Sufi. Sheikh Mustafa was founder of the Qadiriyyathun Nabaviyyah Sufi order.

== Early life ==
Sheikh Mustafa was born in Beruwala, Sri Lanka. His father Baawa Aadam was a descendant from Sultan Jamaluddeen bin Alawuddeen dunnurainul Usmani, who was a descendant of Caliph Uthman ibn Affan, the third Caliph of Islam. Sultan Jamaluddeen bin Halauddeen ruled Konya, Turkey. Sultan Jamaluddeen and his eleven companions migrated to Sri Lanka. Later Sultan Jamaluddeen's friends settled in different places in Sri Lanka such as Colombo, Galle, Hambantota and Batticaloa. They proved influential in mathematics, astronomy, medicine and science.

Sheikh Mustafa's father died when he was four and his mother died several years later. After his mother's death, he entered his sister's care.

== Education ==
Sheikh Mustafa went Kayalpattinam, India for Islamic education at the age of twelve. He studied under various scholars in Kayalpatnam. Specially he studied under Palayam Habib Muhammad Alim and tayka sahib Wali . Later he travelled to Makkah and studied under scholars such Shaykh al-Islam Ahmad Zayni Dahlan, As-Sheikh Hisbullah Makki, As-Sheikh Abdul Hameed Sarwani.

== Later life ==
He returned to Sri Lanka after his Islamic Education and began teaching. He met Sheikh Ahmed Ibn Mubarak, who was an Islamic Scholar from Hadarmout, Yemen, while he was studying in Kayalpattinam, India.

Later Shiekh Mustafa met Ahmed Ibn Mubarak Mowlana in Sri Lanka and became his spiritual follower. Sheikh Mubarak Moulana founded the Qadiriyyathun Nabaviyyah Tariqa Sufi order which is a branch of Qadiriya Tariqa. Sheikh Mubarak Moulana and Sheikh Mustafa travelled around Sri Lanka to places such as Galle, Beruwala, Balapitiya, Thunduwa, Kahatowita, Malwana, Viyangalla and other places and they established a Takkiya (Sufi meditation center) in those villages.

They founded a Takkiya (Sufi meditation center) in Beruwela. This Takkiya is the headquarters of the Qadiriyyathun Nabaviyyah Tariqa in Sri Lanka. Sheikh Mubarak Moulana later gave Ijaaza and granted the Khilafa of Qadiriyyathun Nabaviyyah Tariqa Sufi order to Sheikh Musthafa.

Sheikh Mubarak Moulana died in the year 1862. His body is buried in Galle. Sheikh Musthafa became the leader of the Qadiriyyathun Nabaviyyah Tariqa. Sheikh Ahdal Mowlana who is the Islamic scholar from Yemen came to Sri Lanka and met Sheikh Mustafa in Beruwela. Both of them initiated the Saheehul Bukhari annual commemoration feasts (popularly known as Beruwela Bukhari Feast) in Beruwela Takkiya. He performed his sixth and last Hajj in 1888. He died on 25 July 1888 in Makkah. His body is buried in Jannathul Mualla, Makkah, in the vicinity of Khadija bint Khuwaylid grave. Sheikh Mustafa was the first Ajami (non-Arabi) who is buried in Jannathul Mualla, Makkah.

== Works ==
Sheikh Mustafa was one of great scholar who contribute to Arwi (Arabic-Tamil).

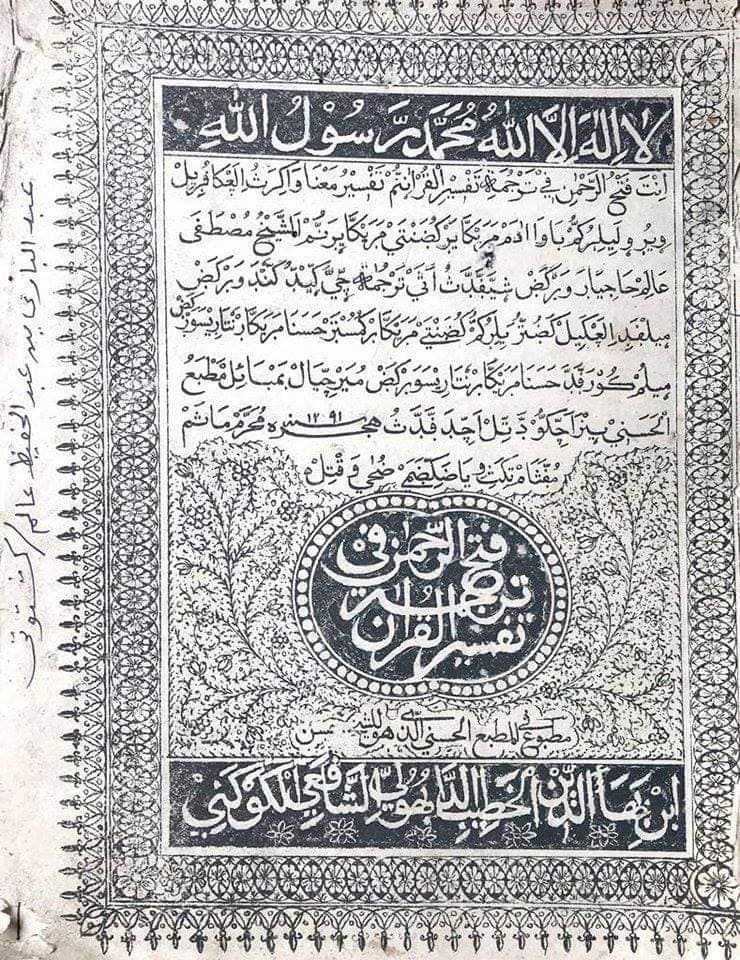
Fathhur-Rahma Fi Tarjimati Tafsir al-Quran, by Shiekh Mustafa.

- Fathhur-Rahma fi Tarjimati Tafsir al-Quran (Qur'an translation)

Sheikh Mustafa wrote many books on a variety of religious and social topics and was the first person to translate the Qur'an into Arabic Tamil under the title Fathhur-Rahma fi Tarjimati Tafsir al-Quran. This was published in five volumes in Hijri 1291/1874.

- Mizan Maalai is an Arabic Tamil poetry book which includes 149 poems which is the first printed Tamil (Arwi) book in Tamil printing history in Sri Lanka. This book briefly discuss about the Islamic Aqida .
- Kawaithul Bawaarikkul Hidaayaa (Fiqh book)
- Baakiyatus Saalihaath Waddurhis Saabihaat (Fiqh book)

== See also ==
- Al-Quran
- Shafi'i
- Qadiriyya
- Sufism
- Arwi

== External sources ==
- "Important Arwi authors: Shaykh Mustafa of Beruwala". Archived from the original on 22 August 2004.
- Muslim Personalities in Sri Lanka, then and now.
