= Muhammad Amrullah =

Indonesian scholar (1840–1909)

Muhammad Amrullah Tuanku Muhammad Abdullah Saleh (1840 in West Sumatra – 1909 in West Sumatra) also known as Tuanku Kisai, was a great scholar of Minangkabau and an ancestor of two major figures in the Malay world, his son, Abdul Karim Amrullah, and grandson, Hamka. His grandfather was Tuanku Nan Tuo, one of the prime movers of the Padri in West Sumatra.

Amrullah was a follower of the Naqshbandi order and he is listed as one of the Kaum Tua movement. His son Abdul Karim Amrullah, was a pioneer and major figure in the struggle, and also a follower of the Kaum Muda movement. Abdul Karim Amrullah rejected the Naqshbandi deeds; while rejecting the bond 'taqlid', he was more likely inclined to the beliefs of Muhammad Abduh. Amrullah has married a total of eight times and have 46 children.

== Origin ==
His father, Tuanku Abdullah Saleh held the title Tuanku Sheikh Guguk Katur. He was a disciple of Abdullah Arif or known as Tuanku Nan Tuo in Koto Tuo, Agam Regency.

Tuanku Abdullah Saleh was a great scholar who memorized the book of Hikam Sufism of Ibn 'Athaillah. He was a Minangkabau custom expert, so he was not only an authority figure in religion but also of local custom affairs. He heavily read the writings of Imam al-Ghazali on khalawat. His teacher, Tuanku Nan Tuo, who held him in high esteem agreed to wed his teenage daughter Siti Saerah to Tuanku Abdullah Saleh, making him his son-in law.

== Education ==
He earned his early education from his own grandfather and grandmother in the tradition of the Minangkabau. Later he studied religion from his grandfather Sheikh Tuanku Pariaman in Koto Tuo. From her grandmother, Muhammad Amrullah learn nahwu, Sharaf, Manthiq, Ma'ani, Tafseer and Fiqh.

In Mecca he studied to Ahmad Zayni Dahlan, a famous scholar of Mecca, and learn also to Sheikh Mohammed Hasbullah and several other scholars. He also studied with Ahmad Khatib and Tahir Jalaluddin. At the age of 26, Muhammad Amrullah have been given a diploma and a teaching assignment by his grandfather, Abdullah Arif or Tuanku Nan Tuo in the village. He taught are the science of Tafsir, Fiqh, Sufi, and the sciences tools, namely nahwu, Sharaf, Manthiq, Ma'ani, Bayan, Badi'.
