= Geostrategy in Central Asia =

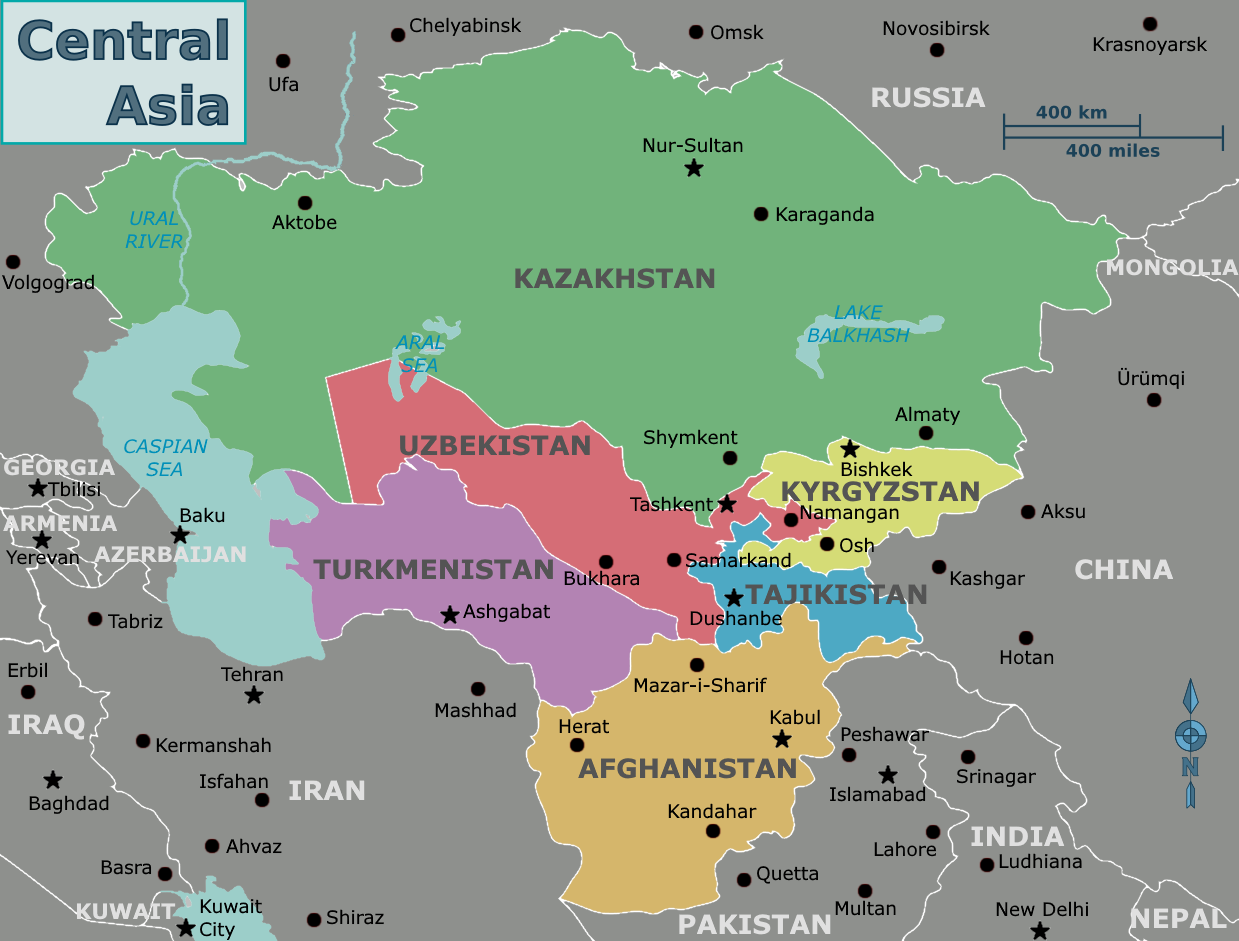
A contemporary political map of Central Asia

Central Asia has long been a geostrategic location because of its proximity to the interests of several great powers and regional powers.

== Strategic geography ==
Central Asia has had both the advantage and disadvantage of a central location between four historical seats of power. From its central location, it has access to trade routes, or lines of attack, to all the regional powers. On the other hand, it has been continuously vulnerable to attack from all sides throughout its history, resulting in political fragmentation or outright power vacuum, as it is successively dominated.

- To the north, the steppe allowed for rapid mobility, first for nomadic horseback warriors like the Huns and Mongols, and later for Russian traders, eventually supported by railroads. As the Russian Empire expanded to the east, it would also push down into Central Asia towards the sea, in a search for warm water ports. The USSR would reinforce dominance from the north, and attempt to project power as far south as Afghanistan.
- To the east, the demographic and cultural weight of Chinese empires continually pushed outward into Central Asia. The Han, Tang, and Ming dynasties would conquer parts of Fergana Valley and Tarim Basin, and the later Qing dynasty of China consolidated Chinese control over this area. China would project power into Central Asia, most notably in the case of Afghanistan, to counter Russian dominance of the region.
- To the southeast, the demographic and cultural influence of South Asia is felt in Central Asia, notably in Tibet, the Hindu Kush, and slightly beyond. Several historical dynasties and powers of South Asia, especially those seated along the Indus River, would expand towards Central Asia. The post-Soviet era was characterized by India and Pakistan in South Asia expanding their interests in the region. India's ability to project power into Central Asia has been limited due to being geographically separated by Pakistan from Central Asia, and the cultural differences between secular India, and what would become a mostly Muslim Central Asia.
- To the southwest, Middle Eastern powers have expanded into the southern areas of Central Asia. Several Persian empires would conquer and reconquer parts of Central Asia; Alexander the Great's Hellenistic empire would extend into Central Asia; two Arab Islamic empires would exert substantial influence throughout the region; and the modern state of Iran has projected influence throughout the region as well. Turkey, through a common Turkic ethnic identity, has gradually increased its ties and influence as well in the region. Furthermore, all Central Asian Turkic-speaking states are together with Turkey part of the Turkic Council.

=== Strategic locations ===
In terms of strategic geography, Central Asia has several important routes through Eurasia, which conquerors would seek to dominate and utilize.

==== Passes ====
- Wakhan Corridor: In Afghanistan, with Tajikistan to the north, Pakistan to the south and China to the east
- Khyber Pass: between Afghanistan and Pakistan
- Torugart Pass: between Kyrgyzstan and China
- Khunjerab Pass: between Pakistan and China
- Dzungarian Gate: between Kazakhstan and China

==== Areas ====
- Eurasian Steppe
- Hindu Kush
- Iranian Plateau
- Tibetan Plateau

== The Great Game ==
From 1813 to 1907, Imperial Russia and United Kingdom were engaged in a strategic competition for domination of Central Asia, known in Britain as the "Great Game", and in Russia as the "Tournament of Shadows." The British sea power and base in the Indian subcontinent served as the platform for a push Northwest into Central Asia, while the Russian empire pushed into the region from the North. The powers eventually met, and the competition played out, in Afghanistan, although the two never went to war with one another (see Durand Line).

The British feared that Russian control of Central Asia would create an ideal springboard for an invasion of Britain's territories in the subcontinent (British India), and were especially concerned about Russia gaining a warm water port. They would fight the First and Second Anglo-Afghan Wars in an attempt to establish control over the region, and to counter the slowly creeping expansion of Russia. In 1907, the British signed the Anglo-Russian Convention which divided Afghanistan between the two powers and outlined the framework for all future diplomatic relations.

== Debated and Debatable zone ==
Alfred Thayer Mahan, the father of U.S. geostrategy, outlined the geostrategic divisions of Eurasia in his 1900 piece The Problem of Asia and Its Effect Upon International Policies. He divided Asia into three parts:

- Russian dominated land to the north of the 40th parallel;
- British dominated lands to the south of the 30th parallel; and
- the Debated and Debatable zone located between the 30th and 40th parallels stretching from the Mediterranean to the Pacific, including Turkey, Iran, Afghanistan and China which remained nominally independent from European colonization.

Within this vast zone lie significant parts of Central Asia, including the regions of Tibet, Xinjiang, Kashmir, Afghanistan, Uzbekistan, Turkmenistan, Tajikistan, and even Northern Iran, Anatolia and the Caucasus. Glacial meltwater and lakes in Tibet and Kashmir are crucial sources of water for vast swathes of humanity in South and Southeast Asia, while there are considerable hydrocarbon and mineral reserves throughout Central Asia.

Mahan believed that the clash between the Russian land power from the North, pushing down toward warm water port, and the opposing coalition of sea powers from pushing upward from the South (including Britain, the U.S., Japan, and Germany), would play out their conflict in the Debated and Debatable zone. This zone featured areas of political vacuum, underdevelopment, and internecine conflicts which made it both unstable and ripe for conquest.

Even today, Central Asia is politically weak or unstable, and riven by separatism, ethnic, or religious conflict.

== The Heartland ==
Halford J. Mackinder, a British geographer and geopolitician, would describe this region of the world as the Heartland in a 1904 speech The Geographical Pivot of History to the Royal Geographical Society. This idea would become the foundation of his contribution to geostrategy. Geographically, the Pivot encompasses all of Central Asia, with the addition of large parts of Iran, and Russia as well. "Who rules the Heartland commands the World-Island; Who rules the World-Island commands the world."

The Geographic Pivot is an area on the continent of Eurasia which is either landlocked, or whose rivers and littoral fed into inland seas or the ice-locked Arctic Ocean. The Volga, Amu Darya, and Syr Darya drain into lakes, and the Ob, Yenisei and Lena drain into the Arctic. The Tarim and Helmand rivers also fail to drain into the ocean. Most of the region Mackinder defines is steppe land, mottled with patches of desert or mountains. Because of the rapid mobility that the steppe lands allow, Mackinder points to the historical tendency of nomadic horseback or camel-riding invaders coming from the east into the west.

The Pivot's projection into Central Asia is defined on one side by the Caspian Sea and Caucasus, and on the other side by a mountain range running from Pakistan northeast up to Mongolia and southern Russia. This triangular projection south into Central Asia was part of an area inaccessible to the sea powers (Britain, the U.S., Japan, and France primarily). As such, it was a strategically important area from which land power could be projected into the rest of the Eurasian landmass, virtually unimpeded by the sea powers.

== Soviet collapse ==
The dissolution of the Soviet Union in 1991 once again created a situation of political vacuum in Central Asia. The resultant authoritarian but weak former Soviet satellite republics were still considered part of Russia's sphere of influence, but now Russia was only one among many competitors for influence in the new Central Asian states. By 1996, Mongolia would also assert its independence from Russia's influence. Further, the North Caucasus Russian republic Chechnya would claim independence, leading to the First and Second Chechen Wars with Russia winning the latter.

Geostrategist and former United States National Security Advisor, Zbigniew Brzezinski analyzed Central Asia in his 1997 book The Grand Chessboard, terming the post-Soviet region the "Black Hole" and post-Soviet Central Asia (the Caucasus, former SSRs, and Afghanistan) in particular the "Eurasian Balkans." The area is an ethnic cauldron, prone to instability and conflicts, without a sense of national identity, but rather a mess of historical cultural influences, tribal and clan loyalties, and religious fervor. Countries projecting influence into the area is no longer limited to just Russia, but also Turkey, Iran, China, Pakistan, India and the United States:

- Russia continues to influence political decision-making throughout the Caucasus, Central Asia, and former SSRs in general. As some of these countries shed their post-Soviet authoritarian systems and integrate with Western organizations such as the EU and NATO, Russia's influence has decreased in those nations. Yet, Russia continues to be the primary power in both the Caucasus and Central Asia, especially in light of the Russian victory over Georgia - and by proxy Western powers - in August 2008, and the many hydrocarbon deals signed between Moscow and the Central Asian states.
- Kazakhstan has received 78% of total Foreign Direct Investment inflows into Central Asia since 2007, and a vast majority of inflows since 1991.
- Turkey has some influence because of the ethnic and linguistic ties with the Turkic peoples of Central Asia, as well as serving as the Baku–Tbilisi–Ceyhan oil pipeline route to the Mediterranean and a route for natural gas pipelines (South Caucasus Pipeline; Nabucco Pipeline).
- Iran, the seat of historical empires which controlled parts of Central Asia, has historical and cultural links to the region, and is vying to construct an oil pipeline from the Caspian Sea to the Persian Gulf.
- China, projects significant power in the region through the Shanghai Cooperation Organisation, energy/oil investment, and trading.
- Due to a geopolitical desire for strategic depth and a large influx of Afghan refugees and mujahideen into Pakistan beginning with the Soviet invasion of Afghanistan, Pakistan has established considerable influence in Pashtun-dominated regions of Afghanistan through organizations like the Afghan Taliban. During the Cold War, the opportune location of Pakistan—formerly the northwest frontier of the British Raj during the Great Game—was utilized by the US to maintain strategic parity with the Soviet Union, such as U-2 missions based in Peshawar and support for the Afghan Jihad. The flagship arm of the Belt-and-Road Initiative -- China-Pakistan Economic Corridor (CPEC) -- begins with the Karakoram Highway between Xinjiang, China and Gilgit-Baltistan, Pakistan, and culminates in Gwadar Port, Balochistan, providing China with an alternative land-route to the Arabian Sea in case of closure of the Straits of Malacca as well as proposed pipelines and transit routes linking Central Asian nations like Uzbekistan, Turkmenistan and Afghanistan with Indian Ocean trade.
- India, as a nuclear-armed and strong rising power, exercises much influence in the region, especially in Tibet with which it has cultural affinities. India is also perceived as challenging a potential counterweight to China's regional power. The Farkhor Air Base in Tajikistan gives the Indian military the required depth and range in seeking a larger role in South Asia and is a tangible manifestation of India's move to project its power in Central Asia, a policy goal formally enunciated in 2003–2004.
- The United States with its military involvement in the region is also significantly involved in the region's politics but on a lower level than either China or Russia whose relations with the Central Asian states are more comprehensive, and lack the democratization factor which Washington espouses.

== War on terror ==
In the context of the United States' war on terror, Central Asia has once again become the center of geostrategic calculations. Pakistan's status has been upgraded to a "major non-NATO ally" because of its central role in serving as a staging point for the war in Afghanistan and for providing intelligence on Al-Qaeda operations in the region. Afghanistan, which had served as a haven and source of support for Al-Qaeda, under the protection of Mullah Omar and the Taliban, was the target of a U.S. invasion in 2001, and ongoing reconstruction and drug-eradication efforts. U.S. military bases were also established in Uzbekistan and Kyrgyzstan (the Uzbek presence was later withdrawn), causing both Russia and China to voice their concern over a permanent U.S. military presence in the region at a time when disengagement with Central Asia was considered detrimental to American long-term security interests. At the same time, US strategic thinking was urged to be of a lower profile to avoid perceptions of the US as a regime patron.

Western observers and governments have claimed that Russia, China and the former Soviet republics have used the language of the war on terror to quash minority separatist movements as well as some religious groups. This was also done through a creeping increase in authoritarianism justified through the war on terror.

== Drug trafficking ==
The Silk Road which once brought prosperity to Central Asia in the silk trade is now a highway for drugs from Afghanistan to Russia that has contributed to economic, political and social problems in the region. The drug trade is proliferating in Central Asia because of the weakness of its nation-states and its pivotal geo-strategic location. The low volume of drug seizures (about 4 percent of the estimated total opiate flows) indicates the lack of state power to regulate Central Asian borders as well as the corruption of its officials. The propagation of the drug trade perpetuates the weakness of Central Asian states by destabilizing the region through the financing of militant Islamic groups’ campaigns, increasing drug abuse, and the spread of AIDS/HIV.

Another large factor in the development of the drug trade in Central Asia is the region's geography. Three of Central Asia's southern states, Tajikistan, Uzbekistan and Turkmenistan, share a collective border of about 3,000 km with Afghanistan, which produces about 70 percent of the world's heroin. An estimated 99 percent of Central Asia's opiates originate from Afghanistan. Kyrgyzstan, Tajikistan and Kazakhstan share a border with the Chinese province, Xinjiang, through which drug traffickers access major opiate producers such as Laos, Thailand and Myanmar. Central Asia's proximity to these states makes the region a hub for the drug trade throughout the world.

During the Soviet era, Central Asia's border to Afghanistan was mostly blocked off with little cross-border trade or travel. When Soviet troops invaded Afghanistan in 1979, the border began to open up. Veterans from the war started to bring back heroin in small quantities, but as soon as its potential large profits were realized, criminal groups took over the trade. Soviet Union created Central Asian states, often without ethnic or topographical considerations, causing them to be notoriously weak. With the downfall of the Soviet Union's, irrelevant border delimitations, transition to a capitalist economy and absence of historical statehood led the Central Asian economies to collapse, and the political situation to become chaotic. Disadvantaged people in the region turned to the drug trade for profit and took advantage of the lack of border controls. Drugs became and continue to be a major source of funding for Islamic militant groups and warlords trying to gain control in the region.

These militant groups, which the international community often deem terrorist groups, use drugs to finance their campaigns. As Abdurahim Kakharov, a deputy interior minister of Tajikistan said in 2000, "terrorism, organized crime and the illegal drug trade are one interrelated problem.” The Islamic Movement of Uzbekistan (IMU), classified as a terrorist organization by the Clinton administration in 2000, is deeply involved with drug trafficking. Although the IMU, whose power was at its peak in the late 1990s, claimed to fight against the region's civil government in the name of the caliphate, it also appeared to be highly motivated by the drug trade. The IMU had alliances with the Taliban government and al-Qaeda in Afghanistan, along with members of Tajik government from having fought together in the Tajik civil war. This allowed the IMU to easily transport drugs from Afghanistan and Tajikistan. Before the U.S. military dismantled it in 2001, the IMU frequently made small incursions in Kyrgyzstan and Uzbekistan around August, after the harvest of heroin. Arguably, the IMU used incursions to create instability in the states and distract law enforcement to more easily transport the new heroin harvests. The UNODC estimates that the IMU brought in 60 percent of the heroin traffic in the region. The IMU's deep involvement in the drug trade indicates that it may have focused more on criminal activities than political and religious aims.

Aside from militant groups, government officials at all levels are involved in the illicit drug trade in Central Asia. The collapse of economies post-Soviet Union leads many low-paid government authorities to corruption. They are often given bribes to look the other way as smugglers transport drugs through the border. Fear of retaliating violence from drug lords also is a factor in the corruption of low-level officials. Corruption in the region, however, has evolved from passive low-level bribing to the direct involvement of state institutions and senior government officials. In 2001, the secretary of Tajikistan's Security Council admitted that many of its government's representatives are involved in the drug trade. Also pointing to high-level government corruption in the drug trade, Turkmenistan's president, Saparmurat Niyazov, publicly declared that smoking opium was healthy. Central Asian state governments tend to have low drug confiscation levels, as officials only use the arrests to provide an appearance of fighting drugs and to ensure a state monopoly on the trade. For instance, although trafficking has increased since 2001, the number of opiate seizures in Uzbekistan fell from 3,617 kg in 2001 to 1,298 kg in 2008, while heroin confiscations remain constant.

The illicit drug trade has created adverse social effects in Central Asia. The number of registered drug users in the region has increased dramatically since 1990 as the drug trafficking has made drugs more widely available, which in turn lowers the cost, promoting abuse. In 1996 there were about 40,000 registered drug users, while in 2006 there were over 100,000 registered users. This rapid increase in the number of drug users is fueling the spread of HIV/AIDS in the region, as users share needles and perform unprotected sex. It is estimated that 60-70 percent of newly registered HIV/AIDS cases are a result of using shared needles. The UNODC maintains that there has been a six-fold increase in HIV/AIDS cases since 2000 in Kazakhstan and Uzbekistan.

== See also ==
- Belt and Road Initiative
- Chinese century
- China containment policy
- Greater Central Asia
- History of Central Asia
- List of disputed territories of China
- Petroleum politics
- Sphere of influence
