= Unholy Wars =

- Author: John K. Cooley
- Language: English
- Genre: International terrorism
- Publisher: Pluto Press
- Publication date: 1999
- Publication place: UK
- Media type: Paperback
- Pages: 288
- ISBN: 978-0745319179
- OCLC: 656249884

Unholy Wars: Afghanistan, America and International Terrorism is a book by John K. Cooley, a news correspondent. The book presents Cooley's account of United States policies and alliances from 1979 to 1989 in the Middle East, the flaws and the lacunae inherent in US handling of the affairs, and their contribution into the emergence of a form of terrorism which continues to affect several regions of the World.

Cooley has spent decades in the Middle East and the book is the result of his studies of the subject matter, and his interaction with a number of administrators, diplomats, politicians and the common people.

== Chapters ==
Unholy Wars is divided into eleven chapters noted below:

1. Carter and Brezhnev in the Valley of Decision
2. Anwar al-Sadat
3. Zia al-Haq
4. Deng Xiaoping
5. Recruiters, Trainers, Trainees and Assorted Spooks
6. Donors, Bankers and Profiteers
7. Poppy Fields, Killing Fields and Drug lords
8. Russia: Bitter Aftertaste and Reluctant Return
9. The Contagion Spreads: Egypt and the Maghreb
10. The Contagion Spreads: The Assault on America

== Reception ==
According to Norwegian researcher Thomas Hegghammer, Unholy Wars did the most to propagate the view that the CIA trained the Afghan Arabs. Cooley described "the central role of the CIA’s Muslim mercenaries, including upwards of 2,000 Algerians, in the Afghanistan war," however journalist Peter Bergen writes that Cooley did not present any evidence for his claims. According to historian Odd Arne Westad—based on information by Soviet defector Vasili Mitrokhin—the book "obviously originates in Soviet disinformation from the 1980s." (Note: Russia historian J. Arch Getty, writing in the American Historical Review, raised questions about the trustworthiness and verifiability of Mitrokhin's material about the Soviet Union, doubting whether this "self-described loner with increasingly anti-Soviet views" would have had the opportunity to "transcribe thousands of documents [and] smuggle them out of KGB premises." Former Indian counter-terrorism chief Bahukutumbi Raman also questions both the validity of the material and the conclusions drawn from them.)

== See also ==
- Secret Affairs: Britain's Collusion with Radical Islam
- Devil's Game
- The Grand Chessboard
- List of books about Al-Qaeda
