= Mark Curtis (British author) =

British historian and journalist

Mark Curtis is a British author, historian and journalist who is the co-founder and editor of media organisation Declassified UK. He is also the author of several books on British foreign policy since the Second World War, including Secret Affairs: Britain's Collusion with Radical Islam, Unpeople: Britain's Secret Human Rights Abuses and Web of Deceit: Britain's Real Role in the World.

== Biography ==
Curtis studied at Goldsmiths, University of London and the London School of Economics, before becoming a research fellow at the Royal Institute of International Affairs. He subsequently worked at the international development NGOs ActionAid and Christian Aid, before becoming director of the World Development Movement. He established a consultancy, Curtis Research, and undertook research projects for international NGOs.

He co-founded the investigative journalism website Declassified UK with Matt Kennard in 2019; focusing on the foreign, military and intelligence policies of the British government.

== Works ==
=== Web of Deceit ===
In 2003, Curtis published Web of Deceit: Britain's Real Role in the World. The book discusses British foreign policy since the Second World War, including Britain's role in the "war on terror" as part of the policies of the second Blair ministry. In the book, Curtis claims that Britain is an "outlaw state", as according to him it frequently violates international law and supports autocratic regimes. Curtis also focuses on events such as the expulsion of the Chagossians, UK government involvement in the Indonesian Communist Purge, Operation Ajax, the Mau Mau Uprising and the Malayan Emergency. Web of Deceit was praised by Green Party politician Caroline Lucas as being "a remarkable rescue operation" and "a powerful call to action for all those who strive to understand how the world has been shaped by western powers in order that they may change it."

=== Unpeople ===
In 2004, Curtis published his fifth book, Unpeople: Britain's Secret Human Rights Abuses. The book analyses the Blair ministry's foreign policies since the 2003 invasion of Iraq, and connects to various foreign policy decisions of the Home Office since the end of the Second World War. Curtis analysed various events such as the Ramadan Revolution, the New Order regime's rise to power, the Vietnam War, and the 1973 Chilean coup d'état; arguing that the British government either supported or welcomed these events, and conducts secretive propaganda claims to misinform the British public of events occurring abroad. The book was translated into Croatian in 2017 by Sanja Stojić.

=== Secret Affairs ===
In Secret Affairs: Britain's Collusion with Radical Islam, published in 2010, Curtis discusses how "Britain has been colluding with radical Islam for decades", claiming this relationship dates back to the 19th and 20th centuries. In the book, Curtis explores British foreign policy in the Muslim world, including the 1953 Iranian coup d'état, Soviet–Afghan War, Kosovo War and Syrian Civil War. According to Curtis, British foreign policy in the region "have generally aimed at maintaining in power or installing governments that will promote Western-friendly oil policies." In addition, the book also claims the British government has supported efforts to train militants from Fada'iyan-e Islam, Harkat-ul-Mujahideen, the Libyan Islamic Fighting Group, the Kosovo Liberation Army and the Islamic Front. The book also explores British involvement in the Soviet–Afghan War, including training and supplying the mujahideen; attempts by the British government to cultivate relations with the Muslim Brotherhood in Egypt after the fall of Hosni Mubarak; the UK's participation in the 2011 military intervention in Libya, and Saudi Arabia–United Kingdom relations.

== Selected publications ==
- Secret Affairs: Britain's Collusion with Radical Islam. Serpent's Tail. 2010. ISBN 978-1-84668-763-1.
- Unpeople: Britain's Secret Human Rights Abuses, Vintage, 2004 ISBN 0-09-946972-3
- Web of Deceit: Britain's Real Role in the World, Vintage, 2003 ISBN 0-09-944839-4
- Trade for Life: Making Trade Work for Poor People, Christian Aid, 2001
- The Great Deception: Anglo-American Power and World Order, Pluto Press, 1998
- The Ambiguities of Power: British Foreign Policy since 1945, Zed Books, 1995
