= Memoirs of Mr. Hempher, The British Spy to the Middle East =

Forged document used for propaganda

Confessions of a British Spy and British Enmity Against Islam
- Author: Hempher/Ayyub Sabri Pasha
- Language: Turkish
- Subject: Anglophobia; Anti-Wahhabi
- Genre: Propaganda
- Publisher: Waqf Ikhlas Publications
- Publication date: 1868
- Publication place: Ottoman Empire
- English publication date: 2001

Memoirs of Mr. Hempher, The British Spy to the Middle East or Confessions of a British Spy is a document purporting to be the account by an 18th-century British agent, Hempher, of his instrumental role in founding the conservative Islamic reform movement of Wahhabism, as part of a conspiracy to corrupt Islam. It first appeared in 1888, in Turkish, in the five-volume Mir'at al-Haramayn of Ayyub Sabri Pasha. He is thought to be the actual author by an Orientalist scholar. It has been described as "apocryphal" and "an Anglophobic variation on The Protocols of the Elders of Zion" by a staff writer for The New Yorker. It has been widely translated and disseminated, is available on the internet, and still enjoys some currency among some individuals in the Middle East and beyond. In 2002, an Iraqi military officer recapitulated the book in a "top secret document".

== Content ==
In the book, a British spy named Hempher, working in the early 1700s, tells of disguising himself as a Muslim and infiltrating the Ottoman Empire with the goal of weakening it to destroy Islam once and for all. He tells his readers: "when the unity of Muslims is broken and the common sympathy among them is impaired, their forces will be dissolved and thus we shall easily destroy them... We, the English people, have to make mischief and arouse schism in all our colonies in order that we may live in welfare and luxury."

Hempher intends ultimately to weaken Muslim morals by promoting "alcohol and fornication," but his first step is to promote innovation and disorder in Islam by creating Wahhabism, which is to gain credibility by being morally strict on the surface. For this purpose, he enlists "a gullible, hotheaded young Iraqi in Basra named Muhammad ibn Abd al-Wahhab." Hempher corrupts and flatters Abd Al-Wahhab until the man is willing to found his own sect. According to Hempher, he is one of 5,000 British agents with the assignment of weakening Muslims, which the British government plans to increase to 100,000 by the end of the 18th century. Hempher writes, "when we reach this number we shall have brought all Muslims under our sway" and Islam will be rendered "into a miserable state from which it will never recover again."

Researcher Philippe Bourmaud, however, believes that Muhammad ibn Abd al-Wahhab made sure that the state prohibition of alcohol is implemented.

By implication, the logic goes, Wahhabism calls for a particularly cautionary, strict and extensive understanding of Islamic condemnation of kḫamr drinking. In the eighteenth century, Abd al-Wahhab, religious reformer strongly influenced by Hanbalism, reiterated the strong condemnation of alcohol. By the early 1870s, it was the turn of Wahhabi scholar Sheikh Abd al-Latif b. Abd al-Rahman to give a reminder of the prohibition.

— Philippe Bourmaud

== Analysis ==
George Packer has characterised Hempher's Memoirs as "probably the labor of a Sunni Muslim author whose intent is to present Muslims as both too holy and too weak to organize anything as destructive as Wahhabism." Bernard Haykel, in a 2008 blog in Harvard University's John M. Olin Institute for Strategic Studies, described the document as an anti-Wahhabi forgery, "probably fabricated by one Ayyub Sabri Pasha."

Sabri Pasha, an Ottoman writer, studied at the naval academy and earned the rank of naval officer, serving for a time in the Hijaz and Yemen. He wrote historical works on the Saudi dynasty and died in 1890. In The Beginning and Spread of Wahhabism, Ayyub Sabri Pasha recounts the story of Abdul Wahhab's association with Hempher the British spy, and their plot to create a new religion.

== Impact ==
An example of a contemporary reference to the book or at least to the theory that Wahhabism is a British conspiracy, is Ayatollah Hussein-Ali Montazeri's 1987 denunciation of Wahhabis as "a bunch of British agents from Najd."

== See also ==
- The Will of Peter the Great
- War against Islam
- Fitnat al-Wahhabiyya
- Secret Affairs: Britain's Collusion with Radical Islam
