= Devil's Game (book) =

2006 book by Robert Dreyfuss

- Author: Robert Dreyfuss
- Language: English
- Subject: U.S. foreign policy
- Publisher: Dell Publishing
- Publication date: October 2006
- Publication place: United States
- Media type: Paperback
- Pages: 400
- ISBN: 0805081372
- OCLC: 59003012

Devil's Game: How the United States Helped Unleash Fundamentalist Islam is a 2006 book by Robert Dreyfuss, an American investigative journalist. It discusses how Western governments supported the growth of Islamic fundamentalism for several purposes.

== Contents ==
The book addresses a number of different Middle Eastern interventions made by the Western world, as outlined below.

=== Islamic radicalism as a tool against pro-Soviet pan-Arabism ===
The book discusses how Western governments supported the growth of the Muslim Brotherhood in order to sabotage the efforts of Pro-Soviet Arab Nationalist leaders such as Gamal Abdel Nasser of Egypt. The goals of Nasser were to end Western domination and control in the Middle East. This was a great threat to Western interests, who used the Muslim Brotherhood to destabilize the Nasser government.

=== Support of Islamic radicalism as an anti-Communist strategy ===
"[T]he United States spent many years trying to construct a barrier against the Soviet Union along its southern flank. The fact that all of the nations between Greece and China were Muslim gave rise to the notion that Islam itself might reinforce that Maginot Line-style strategy. Gradually the idea of a green belt along the "arc of Islam" took form. The idea was not just defensive. Adventurous policymakers imagined that restive Muslims inside the Soviet Union's own Central Asian republics might be the undoing of the USSR itself, and they took steps to encourage them." (Introduction of Devil's Game)

Dreyfuss also discusses how the West used Islamic radicalism to suppress Communist movements in the Middle East and the rest of the Islamic world. He provides a comprehensive review of the support of Western governments for the Mujahadeen and Jihadi Islamic fighters, who were trained and sent into Afghanistan. With the close support and advice of CIA paramilitaries, these Islamic jihadists helped defeat Soviet forces in Afghanistan. The book also describes the work of Bernard Lewis and his model of Islamic Balkanization, where the CIA secretly supported Islamic movements within the Soviet Union to utilize them as Anti-Communist insurgents in the event of war. The consequence of this CIA program is the present-day Islamic Chechen separatist conflict that the Russians are fighting.

=== Islamic radicalism as a divisive tactic ===
The author also discusses how the Israeli government supported the growth of Hamas as a tool to fight the Palestine Liberation Organization (PLO). The PLO was always viewed as the major threat to Israel, because they were the more educated and secular Palestinians. They had fought a very effective campaign against Israel, whereas Hamas has had very limited success. The book predicts the current Palestinian crisis where (PLO) Fatah and Hamas militias battled each other in the streets of Gaza and in other parts of Palestine for dominance over the Palestinian people. Dreyfuss claims that the political and economic isolation of Hamas is currently suffocating the new government. Gaza is running out of gas and public workers have not been paid for many months. This has been a strategic victory for Israel in a classic example of divide and conquer.

== Critical reception ==
Publishers Weekly gave the book a "Starred Review", stating that it "reaches farther and deeper into the subject than most". Vanessa Bush for the American Library Association described it as "well-researched and insightful." L. Carl Brown in Foreign Affairs, criticized the book's emphasis, arguing that the US has also opposed Islamic fundamentalism on many occasions, and that the author would have done better to focus on America's "excessively intrusive, regime-changing approach to the Middle East" instead, although he acknowledges in the next line that "Ironically, that is the thrust of his remarks on pages 15-17 of the introduction."

== See also ==
- Unholy Wars
- The Grand Chessboard
- The Israel Lobby and U.S. Foreign Policy
- Secret Affairs: Britain's Collusion with Radical Islam
