= The Grand Chessboard =

1997 book by Zbigniew Brzezinski

The Grand Chessboard: American Primacy and Its Geostrategic Imperatives
- Book cover
- Author: Zbigniew Brzezinski
- Language: English
- Subject: Geostrategy of United States in Central Asia
- Genre: Geopolitics, International Politics
- Publisher: Basic Books
- Publication date: 1997
- Publication place: United States
- Pages: xiv + 223
- ISBN: 0-465-02725-3

The Grand Chessboard: American Primacy and Its Geostrategic Imperatives (1997) is one of the major works of Zbigniew Brzezinski. Brzezinski graduated with a PhD from Harvard University in 1953 and became Professor of American Foreign Policy at Johns Hopkins University. He was later the United States National Security Advisor from 1977 to 1981, under the administration of President Jimmy Carter.

Regarding the landmass of Eurasia as the center of global power, Brzezinski sets out to formulate a Eurasian geostrategy for the United States. In particular, he writes that no Eurasian challenger should emerge that can dominate Eurasia and thus also challenge U.S. global pre-eminence.

Much of Brzezinski's analysis is concerned with geostrategy in Central Asia, focusing on the exercise of power on the Eurasian landmass in a post-Soviet environment. In his chapter dedicated to what he refers to as the "Eurasian Balkans", he uses Halford J. Mackinder's Heartland Theory.

Eurasia

The book was reviewed by The New York Times, Kirkus Reviews, Foreign Affairs, and other publications in the USA and other countries, especially Germany.

== Introduction – Superpower Politics ==
In the introduction, Zbigniew Brzezinski outlines his overall concept. He asserts that the current global dominance of the United States depends on how effectively it manages the complex power dynamics of the Eurasian continent. A stable continental balance, with the United States acting as a political arbiter, should enable the gradual achievement of overarching goals. His ultimate vision is a "world community."

The ultimate objective of American policy should be benign and visionary: to shape a truly cooperative global community, in keeping with long-range trends and with the fundamental interests of humankind. But in the meantime, it is imperative that no Eurasian challenger emerges, capable of dominating Eurasia and thus also of challenging America. The formulation of a comprehensive and integrated Eurasian geostrategy is therefore the purpose of this book." (p. iix)

== Reviews and reception ==
=== USA as an indispensable nation ===
In his 1997 foreword to the German edition, German Minister of Foreign Affairs Hans-Dietrich Genscher assessed Brzezinski's analysis as an "American response that is thought-provoking, that will provoke approval but also contradiction." Brzezinski's openly expressed conviction that the worldwide presence of the United States is not only in the American interest, but also in the global interest, is correct and confirmed by the European experience of the 20th century, according to Genscher. The USA is still the "indispensable" nation. Europeans should always ask themselves whether there really is "too much America" or rather "too little Europe". Genscher sees Brzezinski's strategy as an attempt to create new structures of world politics through dialogue and rapprochement (with China and Russia), which is not possible without the participation of the United States in cooperation with a strengthened Europe. Genscher also points out, however, that the striving for supremacy always evokes opposing forces.

In his review Bertonha, João Fábio argued that Brzezinski showed the rise of the United States as the dominant global power in the twentieth century formed an imperial model distinct from traditional empires, characterized by rapid expansion and efficient organization. He maintains that this American primacy faces no major challenges in the short term, given U.S. technological and military superiority, its unmatched cultural appeal, and its central role in the global economy.

However, according to Brzezinski, sustaining this position does not rest on these factors alone. It requires an effective geostrategic approach capable of preventing the emergence of rival powers that could threaten American interests. Within this framework, Eurasia occupies a central place, as the decisive geographical arena in which the global balance of power will be shaped in the coming decades. The core of this vision lies in preventing the rise of a dominant power within the Eurasian space through policies of containment, alliances, and diplomatic instruments, with the use of force when necessary, to ensure the continuation of U.S. supremacy.

=== Underestimation of economic dynamics ===
The former German Chancellor Helmut Schmidt wrote in his review of October 31, 1997 in the Zeit that the title alone made "a highly provocative American self-confidence" abundantly clear. Brzezinski's global horizon is praised, but he underestimates "Black Africa, Latin America and the highly important religions of Islam and Hinduism as well as Confucianism in their global weights". China's future role is greatly underestimated. Despite many correct partial analyses, Brzezinski's book neglects the economic dynamics of important states as well as future population growth and the conflicts that will become inevitable as a result. Likewise, the future effects of electronic globalization are not sufficiently appreciated. Schmidt warns against adopting Brzezinski's objective or the conviction that "what is good for the USA is eo ipso good for peace and well-being of the world." For the "continental European citizens, Brzezinski's claim to dominance (should) be an additional incentive for the further expansion of the European Union in the direction of a self-determining Europe."

=== Worldwide cooperation ===
Volker Rühe described the book in his review for the Frankfurter Allgemeine Zeitung on 26 November 1997, as a "bold and probably also provocative, at the same time excellent and valuable contribution" to a new "thinking in the categories of dialogue and exchange, regional and global cooperation, networking of business and politics". In his opinion, the work should be studied in "science, media and, last but not least, governments". Rühe analyzes the author's intention to testify, for him to maintain dominance in Eurasia is not an end in itself, but an essential prerequisite for global stability. In Brzezinski's opinion, America must commit itself to the goal of creating a permanent framework for global geopolitical cooperation. Brzezinski wants to preserve the position of power of the United States in order to let it merge into institutionalized, worldwide cooperation in the long term.

Oliver Thränert of the Friedrich Ebert Foundation also finds in his review that the book is "already worth reading". It is knowledgeable, often historically substantiated, never boring and always follows the guidelines of American national interest, which is somewhat unusual for the German reader. In his opinion, the strategy developed by Brzezinski is "coherent and truly forward-looking", but also "in many respects simplistic", which reduces its value for science.

=== Anachronism ===
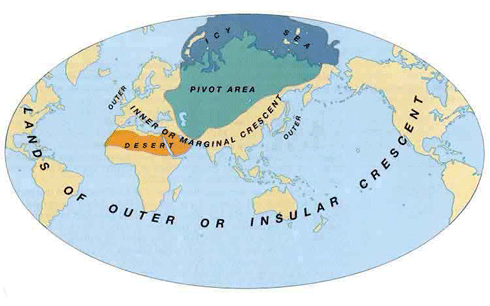
Mackinder's Pivot Area

Sabine Feiner, lecturer at the Institute of Political Science at the University of Regensburg, sees in her thesis (2000) Brzezinski's geostrategy in the Anglo-Saxon tradition of Halford Mackinder ("Heartland theory") and Nicholas J. Spykman ("Rimland"). Brzezinski transcends the power-political component, which is rooted in imperialism and Social Darwinism of the 19th century, through the "vision of a higher justification", in which he identifies the national interest of the USA with the interest of the world. Although the focus is on the world, the national US perspective remains the decisive starting point for the consideration. Pursuing world politics in the tradition of Bismarck seems anachronistic to Feiner, and the vocabulary ("tributaries", "vassals", "hegemon") is also inappropriate. She sees the moral dimension of his portrayal as based on a trust in the historical power of the USA, whose fatefulness is not questioned but understood as providence: "The moral dimension and the associated obligation to world leadership in Brzezinski becomes clear insofar as he tries to present this position not as the result of an intended policy of the USA, but as a historical coincidence. […] With the interpretation that the USA's global political commitment was not the result of its national interests, but was assigned to it by a higher authority, 'history', understood as providence, Brzezinski lends the position of the USA a moral exaltation that is found in the American tradition of exceptionalism is generally to be found." Feiner's work is a little too theory-heavy, Heinz Brill noted in his review. However, her creation, development and evaluation of Brzezinski's "global political conception" were seen as excellently successful. "The work is a pioneering achievement for the German-speaking world."

=== Decline of the United States ===
Emmanuel Todd analyzed Brzezinski's geopolitical strategy in his work After the Empire (2001). Todd considers Brzezinski to be the most astute strategy theorist, "despite his recognizable lack of interest in economic issues." However, America's imperial rule is no longer up to date, since due to the size, complexity and rapid change of the world, a permanent supremacy of a single state is no longer accepted. The dependence of the USA on other countries has now grown strongly. America is trying to conceal its decline through "theatrical military actionism". In reality, it is about securing resources. The fight against terrorism, against Iraq and against the "axis of evil" is only a pretext, a sign of weakness. Europe and Russia, Japan and China are growing into decisive strategic players that relativize the supremacy of the USA. He sees another shortcoming of Brzezinski's analysis in the complete ignorance of Israel. With regard to Ukraine, Todd tends to agree with Samuel P. Huntington, who considers its cultural tendency towards Russia to be stronger. „… With its own dynamics, it (Ukraine) is unable to escape Russian influence without falling under that of another power. The American sphere is too far away and too little materially present to balance Russia's weight. Europe, with Germany at its core, is a real economic power, but it is not dominant in military and political terms. If Europe aspires to an influential position in Ukraine, it is not in its interest to turn it into a satellite, since Europe needs Russia as a counterpoint to the US if it wants to emancipate itself from American tutelage."

=== The role of Europe ===
In 2008, the publicist Hauke Ritz argued that Brzezinski's premises of geopolitical analysis in The Grand Chessboard were wrong, despite their intrinsic logic and high persuasiveness. Eurasia is not a chessboard. "Much more important than the question of whether the 21st century will be an American, European or Chinese one is the question of what premises we want to base the life of the human species on in the 21st century. The US has already submitted its proposals with Guantánamo and the Green Zone in Baghdad. Now the ball is in Europe's court. Europe has the strength and the opportunity to bury the US plans to conquer the world. And Europe should do the same in the interests of civilisation."

Chris Luenen, Head of the Geopolitical Program at the Global Policy Institute in London, advocated in a guest article in the Zeit (from 2014) Europeans should depart from the strategy of the USA, which is oriented towards Brzezinski's The Grand Chessboard. Luenen cannot see how the US policy towards Ukraine and Russia or America's Grand Strategy as such could be in the interest of Europe or world peace. In his view, it is not in conformity with the realities of a rapidly changing world, either.

"It is often argued that Europe, and Germany in particular, must choose between a pro-Atlantic and a pro-Russian/Eurasian orientation. This is not the case at all. Europe should not shape its foreign policy on the basis of emotional images of friends and enemies, but on the basis of a sober policy of interests."

=== Russia and NATO's eastward expansion ===
David C. Hendrickson, in his article in Foreign Affairs on November 1, 1997, saw the core of the book as the ambitious strategy of NATO to move eastward to Ukraine's Russian border and vigorously support the newly independent republics of Central Asia and the Caucasus, which is an integral part of what Hendrickson said could be called a "tough love" strategy for the Russians. Hendrickson considers "this great project" to be problematic for two reasons: the "excessive expansion of Western institutions" could well introduce centrifugal forces into it; moreover, Brzezinski's "test of what legitimate Russian interests are" seems to be so strict that even a democratic Russia would probably "fail".

== See also ==
- Foundations of Geopolitics
- American imperialism
- Geopolitics
- The Great Game
- Unholy Wars
- Secret Affairs: Britain's Collusion with Radical Islam
