= John K. Cooley =

American journalist and author

John Kent Cooley (November 25, 1927 – August 6, 2008) was an American journalist and author who specialized in islamist groups and the Middle East. Based in Athens, he worked as a radio and off-air television correspondent for ABC News and was a long-time contributing editor to the Christian Science Monitor.

Cooley was one of only a handful of Western journalists widely regarded and trusted in the Middle East as an expert on the area's history and politics. He interviewed several of the region's heads of state and was personally acquainted with the senior leadership of the PLO. His many awards include the Council on Foreign Relations' Fellowship for American Foreign Correspondents, and the coveted George Polk Award for distinguished career achievement in international reporting. He was a key part of the ABC News Prime Time Live team that won an Emmy in 1990 for its investigation into the December 21, 1988 bombing of Pan Am Flight 103.

== Background ==
A graduate of Dartmouth College, Cooley served with the U.S. Army in postwar Austria from 1946 to 1947. Returning to America, he undertook his postgraduate studies at the New School University in New York City, then began his journalistic career at the New York Herald Tribune. He lived in North Africa from 1953 to 1964, covering the Algerian War for UPI, NBC News and The Observer, and in 1965 became Middle East correspondent for the Christian Science Monitor in Beirut.

== Middle East ==
A personal friend of King Hussein of Jordan, Cooley interviewed most of the Middle East's heads of state, including Saddam Hussein, Muammar Gaddafi, Anwar al-Sadat, David Ben-Gurion, and the Shah of Iran. He interviewed Yasser Arafat many times and was acquainted with the senior leadership of Fatah and the other secular Palestinian groups.

A personal friend of Ardeshir Zahedi with whom he had a 50 years old friendship and kept corresponding till he died in 2008.

Cooley and his wife Vania were among 90 foreign residents of the InterContinental and Philadelphia hotels in Amman who were taken hostage in June 1970 by George Habash of the Popular Front for the Liberation of Palestine and released after the personal intervention of King Hussein.

Cooley worked with Pierre Salinger on the Investigation into the bombing of Pan Am Flight 103.

== September 11, 2001 attacks ==
Cooley wrote in the Christian Science Monitor on May 23, 2002, that Jordan's General Intelligence Division (GID), which since the early 1990s has been tracking CIA and Pakistani-trained Arab guerrillas, intercepted an al-Qaeda communication between July 5 and August 6, 2001, deemed so important that it was relayed immediately by King Abdullah's men to Washington through the CIA station in the U.S. Embassy in Amman. It was also passed through an Arab intermediary to a German intelligence agent, allegedly to make sure it reached Washington.

The communication stated that a major attack was planned for inside the U.S. and that aircraft would be used. The code name of the operation, wrote Cooley, was Al Ourus al-Kabir — "The Big Wedding."

He wrote for the Monitor.

== Bibliography ==
- Baal, Christ, and Mohammed: Religion and revolution in North Africa, Holt, Rinehart and Winston, 1965
- Green March Black September: The Story of the Palestinian Arabs, Frank Cass & Co., 1973, ISBN 0-7146-2987-1
- Libyan Sandstorm: The Complete Account of Qaddafi's Revolution, Holt, Rinehart, and Winston, 1982, ISBN 0-03-060414-1
- Payback: America's Long War in the Middle East, Brassey's, 1991, ISBN 0-08-040564-9
- Unholy Wars: Afghanistan, America and International Terrorism, 1999, Pluto Press, ISBN 0-7453-1917-3
- With Said, Edward, CIA et Jihad, 1950-2001: Contre l'URSS, une disastreuse alliance, Autrement, 2002, ISBN 2-7467-0188-X
- An Alliance against Babylon: The U.S., Israel and Iraq, Pluto Press, 2005, ISBN 0-7453-2282-4
- How Hate Replaced Hope Cooley's response to 9/11, Christian Science Monitor, September 27, 2001 (archived October, 2001)
- Other unheeded warnings before 9/11?, Christian Science Monitor, May 23, 2002
- East Wind Over Africa Red China's African Offensive, Walker and company, 1965
- Currency Wars, Skyhorse How Forged Money is the New Weapon of Mass Destruction publishing UK, 2008 ISBN 978-1-60239-270-0
