= Ibn Adjurrum =

Moroccan linguist

Ibn Ādjurrūm (Arabic: إبن أَجُرُوم; Berber: Ageṛṛom or Agerrum) and his full name: Abū ʿAbd Allāh Muḥammad ibn Muḥammad ibn Dāwūd al-Ṣanhādjī (Arabic: أبو عبد الله محمد بن محمد بن داوود الصنهاجي). (1273–1323) was a Moroccan grammarian and Islamic Scholar and master of Quranic Recitation from Fez famous for an Arabic synoptic grammar.

== Biography ==
Ibn Adjurrum was born at Fez in 1273-4. He was of Berber origin from the sanhaja Berber tribe. His relatives were from the neighborhood of Ṣafrū. "Ādjurrūm" is a Berber word meaning “religious man” and “poor ṣūfī" (ascetic, Shilḥa: agurram). His grandfather, Dāwūd, is said to have been the first to bear the name.

He died on Tuesday, March 1, 1323. He was buried the next day within the town in Adwat Al-Andalus, the Andalusi quarter near Bāb al-Hamra, also known as Bāb al-Jīzyin.

== Al-Ājurrūmīyya ==
A text entitled Muqaddima (مقدّمة) “Prolegomena” bears the author's name. In full, Al-Muqadimma al-Adjurrumiya fi Mabadi Ilm al-Arabiya, or Matn Al-Ajrumiyyah (متن المقدمة الآجرومية), commonly abbreviated to Al-Ājurrūmīyya. This short treatise, of a few pages, sets out the system of the ʾiʿrab (اعراب) (grammatical desinential inflection). The Muḳaddima summarizes the complex rules of Arabic syntax into a concise, clear and intelligible format, that is easy to memorize. For its brevity and utility it has maintained a wide popularity among Arabic language teachers and students across Arabophone countries, and over 60 commentaries by later grammarians have been produced.

Known in Europe from the 16th century, the Muqaddima was one of the first treatises available to European Arabists for the study of the Arabic grammatical system. Translations have been regularly and widely published in most European languages. It was published in twelve different European versions and editions. A Latin translation of Ibn Adjurrum's Arabic grammar was made by the Italian Franciscan friar, Thomas Obicini of Novara, who had lived for a time as an abbot in Aleppo, and published in Italy in 1621 with the title Grammatica Arabica.

Al-Suyuti (Bughya, 102) places ibn Ājurrūm stylistically in the Kūfah School of grammar, based on his use of the genitive term "khafḍ," (خفض), the desinentially inflective imperative "muʿrab" (معرب), and the "kayfamā" (كيفما) particle (حرف) "ḥarf", to govern the apocopate form "jazm" (جزم).

== Bibliography ==
- Brockelmann, II, 308-10, S II, 332-5
- M. al-Mak̲h̲zūmī, Madrasat al-Kūfa, Bag̲h̲dād 1955, 117
- G. Troupeau, Trois traductions latines de la Muqaddima d'Ibn Ād̲j̲urrūm, in Études d'Orientalisme dédiées à la mémoire de Lévi-Proçal, i, Paris 1962, 359-65.
