= Invasion of Najd =

Date	July AD 625
Location	Najd
Result	Muhammad successfully carries out invasion to deter the Banu Muhareb and Beni Thaalabah tribes

Belligerents
Muslims	Bedouin tribes

The Invasion of Najd, happened in Rabi II or Jumada I AH 4, i.e. in July AD 625.

The Islamic prophet Muhammad led his fighters to Najd to scare off some tribes he believed had suspicious intentions. Some scholars say the Expedition of Dhat al-Riqa took place in Najd as part of this invasion.

== Background and Invasion ==
After the Invasion of Banu Nadir, resulting in the expulsion of the Banu Nadir Jews, Muhammad stayed in Medina for two months. Then he received the news that certain tribes of Banu Ghatafan were assembling at Dhat al Riqa with suspicious purposes. The Ghatafan were an Arabian tribe, descended from Qais.

Meanwhile, the Muslim scouting groups reported building up of bedouin troops of Bani Muharib and Tha‘labah of Ghatfan around Madinah. According to the Sealed Nectar, Muhammad, with his Muslim warriors, hurriedly set out to discipline these new outlaws, cast fear into their hearts and deter them from perpetrating further practices. These deterring operations were carried out repeatedly and did produce effective results. The Bedouins fled into the mountains, and Madinah became immune to their raids.

== Expedition of Dhatur Riqa ==
Mubarakpuri says that in the context of these invasions, one of significance was the Dhat ar-Riqa campaign which some scholars claim, took place in Najd (a large area of tableland in the Arabian Peninsula) in Rabi II or Jumada I AH 4. They substantiate their claim by saying that it was strategically necessary to carry out this campaign in order to quell the rebellious bedouins in order to meet the exigencies of the agreed upon encounter with the polytheists, i.e. minor Badr Battle in Sha'ban AH 4.

The most authentic opinion according to Safi ar-Rahman al-Mubararakpuri, however, is that Dhat ar-Riqa' campaign took place after the fall of Khaibar (and not as part of the Invasion of Najd). This is supported by the fact that Abu Hurayra and Abu Musa al-Ash'ari witnessed the battle. Abu Hurayra embraced Islam only some days before Khaibar, and Abu Musa al-Ash'ari came back from Abyssinia (Ethiopia) and joined Muhammad at Khaibar. The rules relating to the prayer of fear which Muhammad observed at Dhat ar-Riqa' campaign, were revealed at the Asfan Invasion and this scholars say, took place after al-Khandaq (the Battle of the Trench).

== See also ==
- Muhammad as a general
