= Declassified UK =

British current affairs website

- Website type: News and investigative journalism
- Founders: Matt Kennard; Mark Curtis
- Editor: Phil Miller
- Website: declassifieduk.org
- Launched: 2019
- Current status: Active

Declassified UK is a British investigative journalism and media organisation founded in 2019 by Matt Kennard and Mark Curtis. It describes itself as "the leading media organisation uncovering the UK's role in the world." Curtis is an established author on UK foreign and aid policy, and Kennard is a journalist who formerly worked at the Financial Times and wrote for numerous other newspapers.

After Declassified UK had published articles relating to the Ministry of Defence, the Ministry refused to engage or provide further comment to the news organisation. This effective blacklisting in September 2020 led the Council of Europe to issue a media freedom alert for the UK. The UK government only intervened to reverse the blacklisting after Declassified UK threatened legal action in the matter.

Declassified UK has been regulated by Impress since June 2021.

== History ==
Declassified UK was set up in 2019 by Matt Kennard and Mark Curtis and was at first hosted on the website of the Daily Maverick, an independent South African website, before launching a standalone website on 20 September 2021. Kennard is an investigative journalist and author who has previously written for news outlets such as The Guardian, the Financial Times, openDemocracy and The Intercept, usually focusing on Britain's role on the international stage. Curtis is a historian and journalist who has written extensively about post-Second World War period foreign policy of the British government, publishing numerous works on the subject. Declassified's chief reporter is Phil Miller, an investigative journalist, author and filmmaker whose book Keenie Meenie explores the history of Keenie Meenie Services, a British mercenary organization.

Board members at Declassified include South African former MP Andrew Feinstein, activist Kate Hudson, businessman Cecil Hetherington and former Guardian security editor and defence correspondent Richard Norton-Taylor; its advisors include Stella Assange, former Guardian associate foreign editor Victoria Brittain, activist and musician Lowkey, American journalist Glenn Greenwald and Italian journalist Stefania Maurizi.

Its website says: "The 'mainstream' UK media is not uncovering the reality of Britain's role in the world and the public is being largely kept in the dark. This means that governments are not being held to account for their policies. The problem is not just with the UK's right-wing, billionaire-owned media but also with its more 'liberal' outlets and the BBC, the most popular source of news for the British public. The British media are less and less mainstream – and are if anything becoming even more embedded in the establishment, regularly amplifying extremist policies that support war, human rights abusers and corporations contributing to catastrophic climate change. The government publishes key information on its policies virtually every day which is often very revealing. But only a tiny proportion of this is ever covered in the establishment media. Those journalists choose not to cover it, or else don't care. We do. However, much remains hidden. Britain's culture of secrecy is deeply embedded in Whitehall. This means that numerous government policies are hidden from the same public who should be able to hold a government to account in a democracy. These hidden policies often need to be exposed, and the secret state challenged."

=== Ministry of Defence media blacklisting ===
In August 2020, Declassified published a story about a British soldier, Ahmed Al-Batati, being investigated by the Royal Military Police for protesting UK arms sales to Saudi Arabia. British missiles, fighter jets and bombs have been used in the Saudi Arabian-led intervention in Yemen since 2015.

In August 2020, Declassified journalist Phil Miller, who wrote the piece about Ahmed Al-Batati, asked the MoD for comment. An MoD press officer responded by questioning what angle Miller's article was taking and saying they did not know much about Declassified; the officer later told Miller, "we no longer deal with your publication". Following this, the Council of Europe, the continent's leading human rights organisation, issued an alert warning of a serious breach of press freedom. In addition, the International Press Institute wrote a letter to the MoD and the Defence Secretary, Ben Wallace, asking them to clarify the reason for the blacklisting.

After the MoD issued an apology, Declassified editor Mark Curtis told Press Gazette: "We are looking at taking legal action against the MoD because we think they have certainly acted against the Civil Service Code, for example, and there may be other codes of conduct or other legal requirements that they might not be consistent with by telling us that." The National Union of Journalists called upon Wallace to intervene and an independent review was later ordered. The inquiry was headed by Tom Kelly, who was one of Tony Blair's Downing Street press spokespeople when Blair was Prime Minister. It found that MoD press officers believed their communications director had "sanctioned a blanket ban" on giving any comment to the website. Curtis said, "It is clear that Declassified was blacklisted, which is contrary to the way that public officials are required to deal with news organisations. The MoD should admit it and stop trying to let its most senior media official off the hook. The MoD is used to dealing mainly with compliant journalists who are happy to follow the official line. Declassified is different, and seeks instead to perform a public service by revealing what governments do."

=== Reporting ===
In November 2020, according to the Morning Star, Declassified reported that the United Kingdom had 145 overseas military bases in 42 countries, many more than the Ministry of Defence (MoD) had previously claimed. Based on the report, Britain's overseas military network is the second largest in the world after the US.

In February 2021, it reported that members of the British royal family had had more than 200 meetings with leaders of "tyrannical" Middle Eastern monarchies since the start of the Arab Spring in February 2011. The greatest number of meetings was with the Bahraini House of Khalifa and the Saudi regime.

On 8 September 2021, in the wake of the final withdrawal of the United States troops from Afghanistan, Phil Miller reported that "a Cold War-era file on Margaret Thatcher's support for the Afghan mujahideen" was being censored by the UK government. This was despite the fact that the documents have become eligible for release to the National Archives under the 30-year rule.

In January 2022, Richard Norton-Taylor reported in Declassified that British warships deployed to the South Atlantic during the Falklands War were armed with 31 nuclear depth charges. The aircraft carrier HMS Hermes had 18 nuclear weapons on board, the aircraft carrier HMS Invincible had 12 and the RFA Regent had one. The Argentine Foreign Ministry said it would contact Britain about the report. Nuclear weapons are banned from the South Atlantic under the Treaty of Tlatelolco.

In February 2026, Declassified reported that over 50,000 dual-nationals served in the Israeli armed forces during the Gaza war and the subsequent genocide. Of this number, 12,135 soldiers held US citizenship, 6,100 soldiers held French nationality, over 5,000 held Russian citizenship and at least 2,069 were British nationals. The information was obtained via a Freedom of Information request issued to the IDF by lawyer Elad Man from the NGO Hatzlacha.
