= Connect Central Asia =

Indian foreign policy to Central Asia

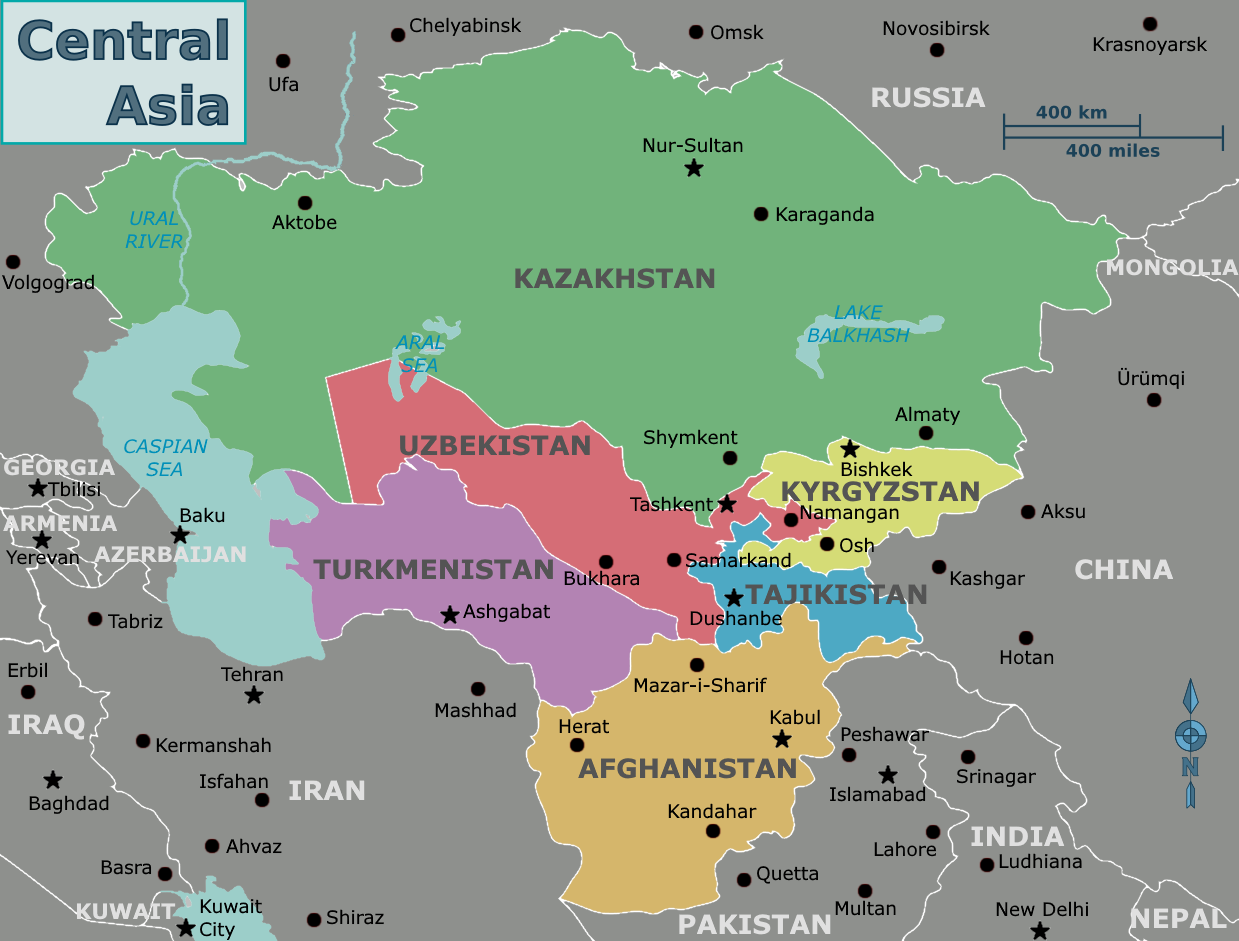
Urban map of Central Asia (click to enlarge)

India's 'Connect Central Asia' Policy is a broad-based approach, including political, security, economic and cultural connections. The importance of this policy was strengthened when the Prime Minister of India visited all the five countries— Uzbekistan, Kazakhstan, Turkmenistan, Kyrgyzstan and Tajikistan— in 2015.

== History ==
=== 2012 elucidation ===
On 12 June 2012 India's Minister of State for External Affairs E. Ahamed outlined some of the elements of India's 'Connect Central Asia' policy as follows:

1. India will continue to build on our strong political relations through the exchange of high level visits. Its leaders will continue to interact closely both in bilateral and multilateral fora.
2. India will strengthen its strategic and security cooperation. India already has strategic partnerships in place with some Central Asian countries. In focus will be military training, joint research, counter-terrorism coordination and close consultations on Afghanistan.
3. India will step up multilateral engagement with Central Asian partners using the synergy of joint efforts through existing fora like the Shanghai Cooperation Organisation, Eurasian Economic Community (EEC) and the Custom Union. India has already proposed a Comprehensive Economic Cooperation Agreement to integrate its markets with the unifying Eurasian space.
4. India looks to Central Asia as a long term partner in energy, and natural resources. Central Asia possesses large cultivable tracts of land and it sees potential for India to cooperate in production of profitable crops with value addition.
5. The medical field is another area that offers huge potential for cooperation. India is ready to extend cooperation by setting up civil hospitals/clinics in Central Asia.
6. India’s higher education system delivers at a fraction of the fees charged by Western universities. Keeping this in mind, India would like to assist in the setting up of a Central Asian University in Bishkek that could come up as a centre of excellence to impart world class education in areas like Information Technology, management, philosophy and languages.
7. India is working on setting up a Central Asian e-network with its hub in India, to deliver, tele-education and tele-medicine connectivity, linking all the five Central Asian States.
8. Indian companies can showcase its capability in the construction sector and build world class structures at competitive rates. Central Asian countries, especially Kazakhstan, have almost limitless reserves of iron ore and coal, as well as abundant cheap electricity. India can help set up several medium size steel rolling mills, producing its requirement of specific products.
9. As for land connectivity, India has reactivated the International North-South Transport Corridor (INSTC). India & Central Asian nations need to join our efforts to discuss ways to bridge the missing links in the Corridor at the earliest and also work on other connecting spurs along the route.
10. Absence of a viable banking infrastructure in the region is a major barrier to trade and investment. Indian banks can expand their presence if they see a favourable policy environment.
11. India will jointly work to improve air connectivity between our countries. India is one of the biggest markets for outbound travelers estimated at USD 21 billion in 2011. Many countries have opened tourist offices in India to woo Indian tourists. Central Asian countries could emerge as attractive holiday destinations for tourists and even for the Indian film industry which likes to depict exotic foreign locales in its films.
12. Connections between our peoples are the most vital linkages to sustain our deep engagement. I would particularly like to emphasise exchanges between youth and the future leaders of India and Central Asia. India already has a robust exchange of students. India will encourage regular exchanges of scholars, academics, civil society and youth delegations to gain deeper insights into each other’s cultures.

=== 2014–present ===
A number of high-level visits have taken place involving heads of states, Presidents and Prime Ministers, foreign, defence and home ministers, in the respective central Asian countries as well as in India. Multilateral dialogues such as the "Central Asia Dialogue" have been conducted. The most recent and third edition was conducted between 18 and 21 December 2021.

== See also ==
- Turkmenistan–Afghanistan–Pakistan–India (TAPI) Pipeline
