= Robert Dreyfuss =

American investigative journalist

- Born: New Jersey, United States
- Education: Columbia University (BA)
- Occupation: Journalist
- Notable credit: Devil's Game

Robert "Bob" Dreyfuss is an American investigative journalist and contributing editor for The Nation magazine. His work has appeared in Rolling Stone, The Diplomat, Mother Jones, The American Prospect, TomPaine.com, and other progressive publications.

== Early life and education ==
Dreyfuss was raised in New Jersey and graduated from Columbia University in 1970. At Columbia, he was a resident of Carman Hall.

== Career ==
In the late 1970s and early 1980s, Dreyfuss was Middle East Intelligence director of the Executive Intelligence Review, the flagship journal of the Lyndon LaRouche movement. In the 1990s Dreyfuss wrote on intelligence issues and foreign affairs, and profiled a number of organizations and public figures, including then governor of Texas, George W. Bush, and senators Trent Lott and John McCain. Since the September 11, 2001 attacks, he has written about the war on terrorism and the Iraq War.

== Hostage to Khomeini ==
His 1981 book, Hostage to Khomeini, was commissioned by Lyndon LaRouche. In the book Robert Dreyfuss provides a detailed explanation of why the Carter administration was fooled into supporting the Khomeini revolutionaries but Khomeini backstabbed the US after the Shah was brought to the US for treatment. The book discusses how various officials in the Carter administration believed that an Islamic Iran could export the Islamic revolution to the Soviet Muslims and cause a break-up of the Soviet Union. Dreyfuss accused Cyrus Hashemi of being a CIA and Mossad agent. Cyrus Hashemi subsequently sued Dreyfuss and Lyndon Larouche.

== The Devil's Game ==
The Devil's Game, published in 2005, is an analysis of how the United States and United Kingdom used Islamists as a powerful weapon against Communists and nationalists in the Muslim world. He believes that the US labelled any nations' leaders who were unwilling to work with the US as Communists. Dreyfuss asserts that the Muslim Brotherhood is historically connected with the CIA and other western intelligence services. He also claims the CIA and the West used the Muslim Brotherhood in an attempt to overthrow President Nasser of Egypt because he nationalized the Suez Canal and kicked many US and European companies out of Egypt. The book makes claims that the Israelis used the Muslim Brotherhood in 1982 in an unsuccessful attempt to destroy President Assad of Syria during the uprisings in Homs and Hama. Lastly Dreyfuss covers the CIA and MI6 backed 1953 Iranian coup d'état.

== Writings ==
- Hostage to Khomeini, cowritten with Thierry LeMarc, New Benjamin Franklin House, 1981. ISBN 978-0-933488-11-3 - PDF download
- Devil's Game: How the United States Helped Unleash Fundamentalist Islam, Metropolitan Books, 2005. ISBN 0-8050-7652-2
