= Al-Ajurrumiyya =

13th-century Arabic grammar book

Al-Ajurrumiyyah
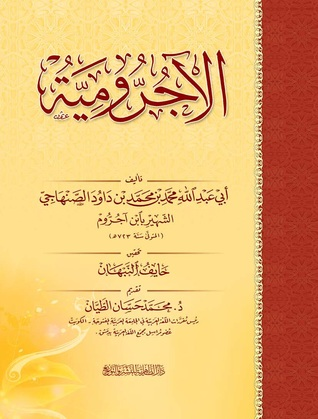
- Author: Ibn Ajurrum
- Language: Arabic
- Genre: Grammar
- Published: 13th century

Al-Ājurrūmiyyah (Arabic: الْآجُرُّومِيَّةِ) in full Al-Muqaddimah al-Ajurrūmiyyah fī Mabādi’ ʿIlm al-ʿArabiyyah is a 13th-century book of Arabic grammar (نحو عربي, naḥw ʿarabī). Very concise for easy memorization, it formed the foundation of a beginner's education in Classical Arabic learning in Arab societies at the time and was one of the first books to be memorized after the Qur'an along with the Alfiya. It was written by the Moroccan, Berber Abū ʿAbd Allāh Sīdī Muḥammad ibn Dāʾūd al-Sanhajī (aka "Ibn Ajarrum") (d. 1324).

In the Preface to his translation of the work, the Rev. J. J. S. Perowne writes:

"The "Ājrūmīya" is a well-known and useful compendium of Arabic Syntax. It is regarded by the Arabs themselves as a standard educational work; and various editions of it have appeared in Boulak, Algiers, and other places. But it is not always easy to meet with these in this country..."
