= Fitnat al-Wahhabiyya =

Book by Aḥmad Ibn-Zainī Ibn-Aḥmad Daḥlān

The Wahhabi Tribulation
- Author: Ahmad Zayni Dahlan
- Original title: فتنة الوهابية
- Language: Arabic
- Subject: History of Wahhabism, Islamic Theology
- Publisher: Işık Kitabevi, Hakikat Kitabevi
- Publication date: 1878
- Publication place: Arabian Peninsula
- Pages: 24 pages

Fitnat al-Wahhabiyya (Arabic: فتنة الوهابية, lit. 'The Wahhabi Fitna') is a booklet written by Ahmad Zayni Dahlan (1816/17–1886) the Grand Mufti of the Shafi'is in Mecca in the late years of the Ottoman Empire.

Dahlan wrote this work against the Wahhabi creed and he sharply inveighed against it, and called them an evil sect. He criticised the Wahhabis for declaring Muslims to be infidels (kafir) and polytheists (mushrik). He also accused the Wahhabis of extremism for killing their Muslim opponents.

The book describes the history of the heretical tenets of Wahhabism in Najd and the Hijaz and the tortures of the Wahhabis inflicted upon Muslims; in which Dahlan exposed and refuted some of what he saw and witnessed from the Wahhabi extreme and terrorist acts and crimes besides their extremist beliefs and misguidance in aqidah (Islamic creed).

During the time that Wahhabism was rapidly spreading. He wrote:

In 1802, Christian era, the Wahhabis marched with large armies to the area of al-Ta'if. In Dhu al-Qa'dah of the same year, they laid siege to the area occupied by Muslims, defeated them, and murdered the people, including men, women, and children. They also lauded the Muslims longing for possessions, and only a few people escaped their barbarism. They even stole gifts from the grave of the prophet Muhammad, took all the gold that was there, and engaged in many similar acts of sacrilege. After that they laid siege to Mecca and surrounded it from all directions to tighten the siege. They blocked the roads to the city and prevented supplies from reaching it. This caused great hardship to the people of Mecca, for supplies became unaffordable and completely unavailable. The situation was such that for some months people resorted to eating dogs.

== See also ==
- Memoirs of Mr. Hempher, The British Spy to the Middle East
- Wahhabi War
- Wahhabi sack of Karbala
- Nejd Expedition
- Hadith of Najd
- Khawarij
