= Soliman Pasha al-Faransawi =

Egyptian commander

Soliman al-Faransawi Pasha
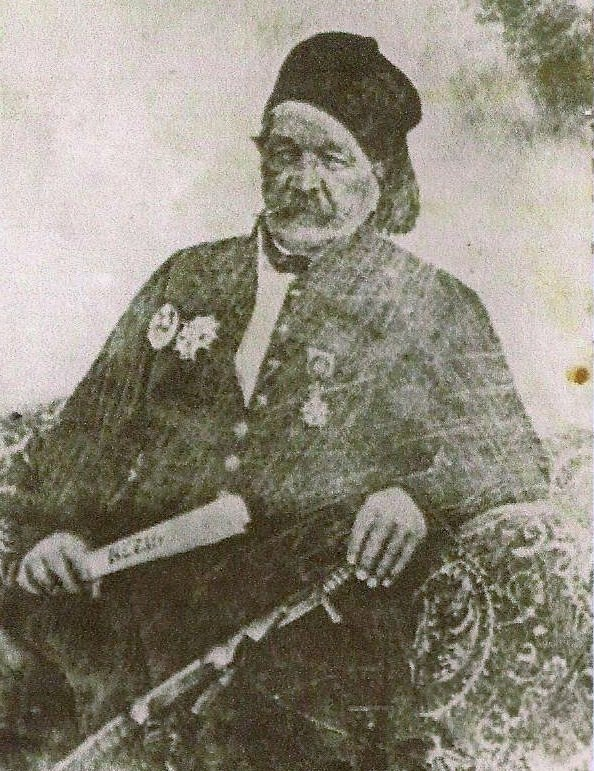
- Born: Joseph Anthelme Sève; 17 May 1788; Lyon, Kingdom of France
- Died: 12 March 1860 (aged 71); Cairo, Egypt Eyalet, Ottoman Empire
- Burial place: Old Cairo, Egypt
- Spouse: Maria Myriam Hanem
- Children: Asmaa al-Faransawi; Nazli al-Faransawi; Mohamed Bey al-Mahdy al-Faransawi (Iskander Bey); Zuhra al-Faransawi
- Relatives: Nazli Sabri (great-granddaughter)
- Military career
- Allegiance: First French Empire (until 1815); Egypt Eyalet
- Conflicts: Napoleonic Wars; Battle of Trafalgar; Battle of Waterloo; Greek War of Independence; Egyptian–Ottoman War (1831–1833); Siege of Akka (1832); Battle of Zerad; Battle of Hims (1832); Battle of Belen Pass; Battle of Konya; Egyptian–Ottoman War (1839–1841); Battle of Nezib

Soliman Pasha al-Faransawi (born Joseph Anthelme Sève; 17 May 1788 – 12 March 1860) was a French officer who fought in the Napoleonic Wars. He reformed the Egyptian army after joining the service of Muhammad Ali. In Egypt, he converted to Islam and received a new name and the nickname al-Faransawi ("the Frenchman"). He served four rulers of Egypt from the dynasty of Muhammad Ali.

He is the great-grandfather of Queen Nazli Sabri, mother of Egypt's penultimate king, Farouk.

== Biography ==
Joseph Anthelme Sève was born in Lyon to Anthelme Sève and Antoinette Julie Sève, the second of six children. Details about his childhood are unknown. He was described as a strong and resilient boy, but he was boisterous and undisciplined, and academics were not his strong suit. His father also tried to interest him in the family business, but to no avail.

=== Naval career ===
On September 25, 1799, his contract for service was signed. Joseph sailed to Toulon on the frigate Le Mouiron as a midshipman. Then, on September 25, 1803, he enlisted in the 2nd Marine Artillery Regiment.

Joseph was assigned to the flagship Bucentaure, where he suffered a crushing defeat at Trafalgar. On October 21, during the ensuing battle, he was wounded by a boarding axe. The Bucentaur sank, and part of the crew was rescued by the Indomptable, which also sank. Of the 1,200 men on board, only 150 made it to shore, including Joseph.

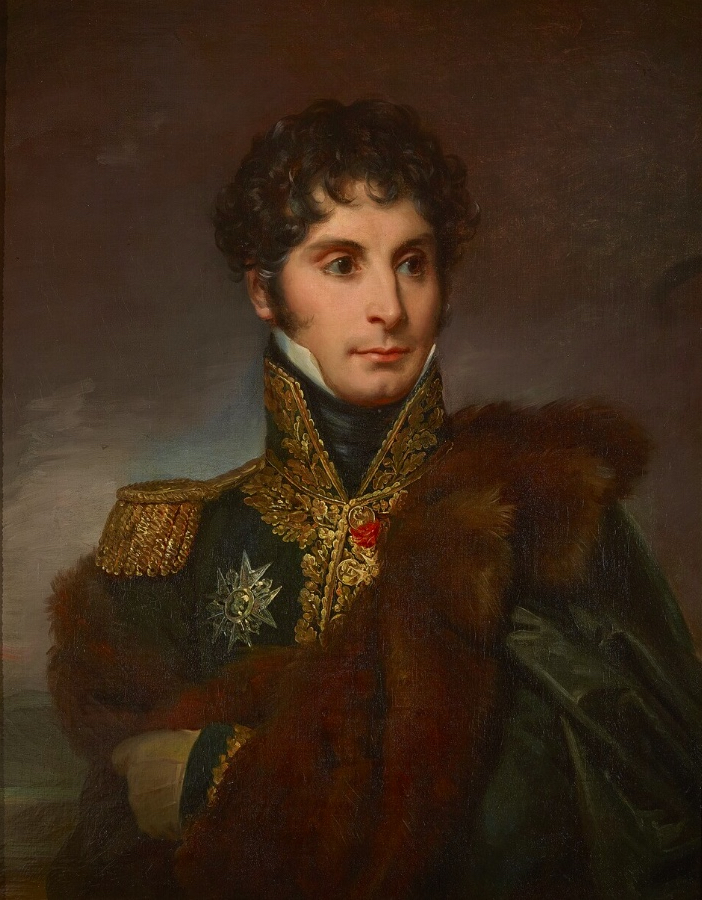
Philippe-Paul, Count of Ségur (1780-1873)

Joseph Sève's naval career progressed very slowly. But one incident saved him from his predicament: when an enraged senior officer was about to strike young Joseph with his cane, Joseph grabbed it and broke it against the officer. Unexpected help came to save Joseph from death: the officer reportedly kidnapped him, then smuggled him through France before transferring him to the 6th Hussar Regiment in Italy on May 2, 1807, under the name Anthelme Sève. According to various sources, this officer was Count Philippe-Paul de Ségur, whom Joseph had rescued several years earlier. Thus began his career in the cavalry.

=== Napoleon's Soldier ===
Sève himself described his new career in the cavalry as the happiest period of his life. Thirty days after joining the regiment, on June 2, 1807, Sève was promoted to brigadier general.

On April 15, 1809, while the 6th Hussar Regiment was performing reconnaissance duties, they encountered the Austrian vanguard. After suffering three saber wounds and a bullet, he was captured and sent to Hungary, where he remained for two years before returning to France.

He also participated in the campaign against Russia. His horse died under him on the Berezina River. He himself was wounded by a lance in Poznań on February 13, 1813. After this, he was promoted to officer and distinguished himself at the head of his hussars. France's subsequent defeat in the war was a severe blow to him.

In 1815, he joined the Emperor for the Hundred Days, during which time he was promoted to lieutenant. He participated in the Battle of Waterloo, serving under Grouchy, whose staff officer he was.

== Egypt ==
=== Modernization of Egyptian army ===
In July 1819 He landed in Egypt under the name of Colonel Joseph, son of Anthelme Sève, and thanks to a recommendation from Ségur, presented himself to the sovereign Mehmet Ali Pasha, who gave him his first mission in Upper Egypt as a research engineer for coal mines.

In 1821, Muhammad Ali elevated him to the rank of aga. Joseph Anthelme Sève, having converted to Islam and taking the name Soliman Agha, was then sent to Aswan to establish and manage a training camp for slaves brought from Sudan as infantry. This initiative was not very successful, partly due to the diseases carried by the Sudanese. To address this problem, Muhammad Ali recruited Egyptian peasants for training, which ultimately made him unpopular with the masses for some time, as the peasants were conscripted for an indefinite period.

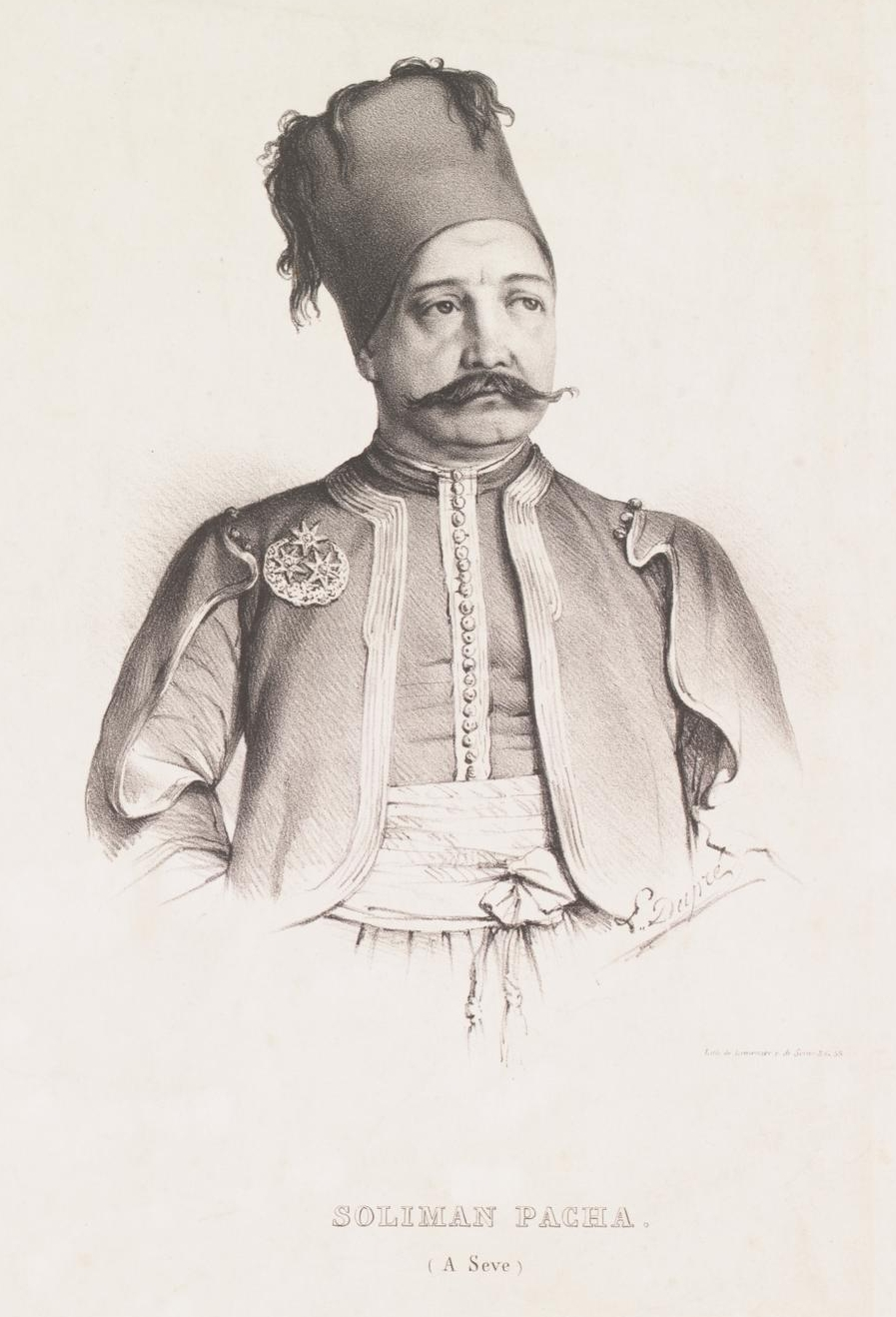
Portrait of Suleiman Pasha

Soliman was also tasked with establishing a military academy in Aswan to train members of Muhammad Ali's family and educated sons of the nobility as officers for the new army. By the end of 1818, numerous European officers had joined him in Aswan, and over the next five years, several additional training camps were established throughout Egypt. The growth and modernization of the Egyptian army did not go unnoticed by either the European powers or the Ottoman sultans.

=== Greece and Family ===
By 1824, when Egyptian troops arrived in Greece to suppress the rebellion, Soliman had become second in power only to Ibrahim Pasha, Muhammad Ali's son and successor. His role there was rather secondary: While Ibrahim Pasha led the campaign, he left Soliman Pasha in control of the Peloponnese. By the end of 1825, the Egyptian army had brought numerous slaves to Egypt. It was likely from this group that Suleiman al-Faransawi met his wife, Maria Mariam Hanem Elessi, known as "the Greek" whom he kidnapped from a Peloponnesian merchant. With her, he had four children: Asma al-Faransawi, Nazli al-Faransawi, Muhammad Bey al-Mahdi al-Faransawi, and Zuhra al-Faransawi.

=== Egyptian–Ottoman War ===
During the Egyptian–Ottoman War of 1831–1833, he accompanied Ibrahim Pasha as a brigadier general. During the siege of Acre, he commanded the Egyptian artillery and defeated Osman Pasha at the Battle of Zerad. He also took part in the battles of Belen Pass and Homs. In 1833, after distinguished himself at the Battle of Konya, Soliman Bey was appointed by Muhammad Ali, Generalissimo of the Egyptian armies and raised to the dignity Pasha.

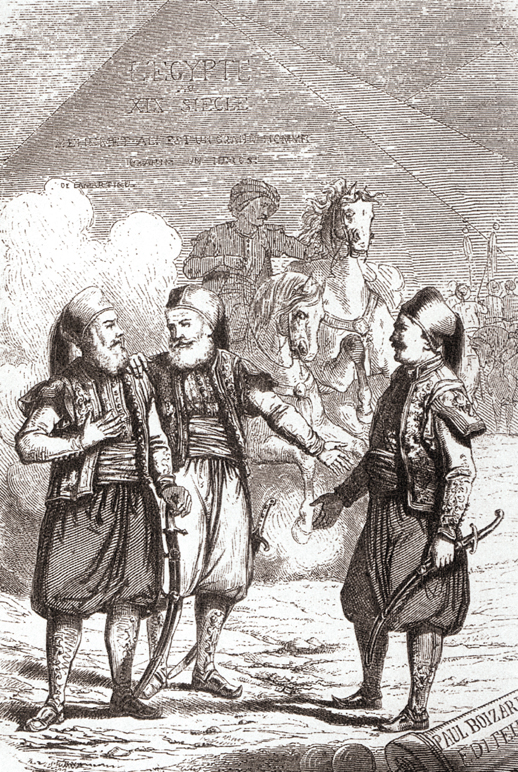
Muhammad Ali Pasha with his son, Ibrahim, and Soliman Pasha al-Faransawi

Hafiz received written orders from the Sultan, some of which have survived; one of them, in particular, read: "Article V. In our opinion, Soliman Pasha is dissatisfied with his position. It is necessary to remove such an important person from the camp; therefore, it is necessary to send an officer to try by all means to entice him to our side. Since Suleiman Pasha is a European, one of our French officers should be sent to him to try to entice him to our side"

Soliman Pasha played an important role in the victory at the Battle of Nezib. As the Egyptian troops fled under deadly Turkish artillery fire, Soliman Pasha, supported by his adjutants, forced the fugitives to form a line, swords in hand, under Turkish artillery fire. Then, to finish the battle, Suliman advanced, followed by the left and center groups. This general advance decided the outcome of the battle, and the Turks were forced to retreat to Marash. For his victory, Soliman was awarded the title "Conqueror of Nezib".

== Late Life ==
After the defeat in the war, Soliman Pasha became a key figure in the French presence in Egypt, receiving guests and holding meetings in his villa in Old Cairo.

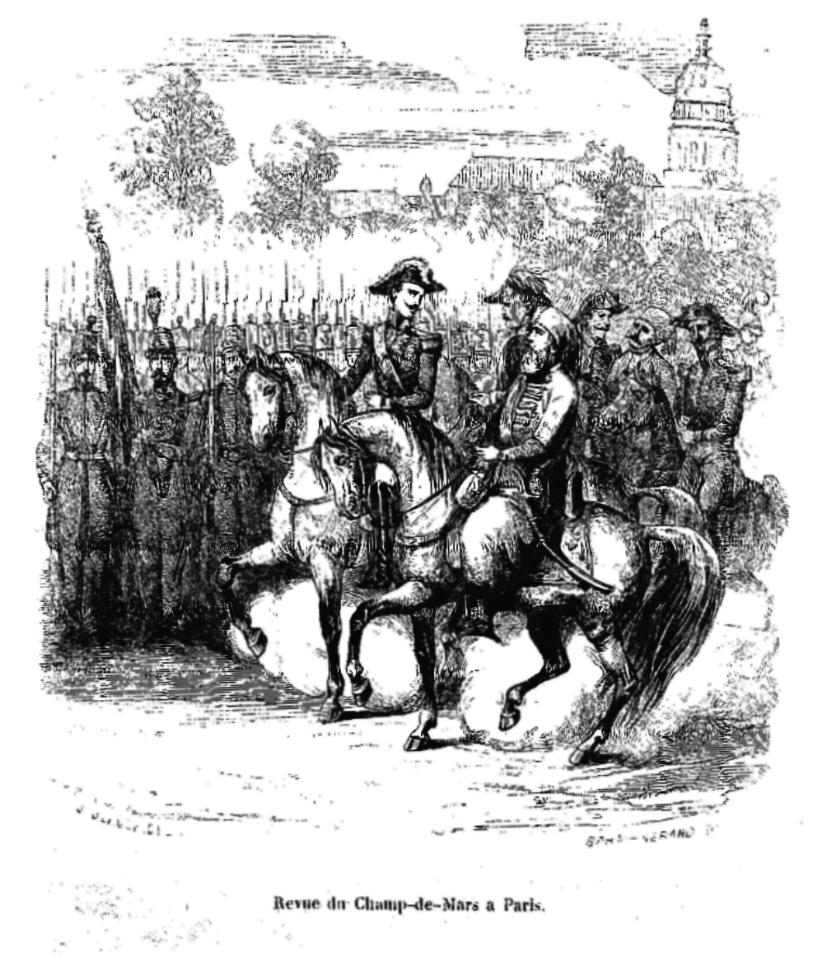
Ibrahim Pasha at a military parade on the Champ de Mars (Paris). In the background, on the right, is Colonel Sève

He visited France on November 20, 1845, via the port of Toulon, accompanying Ibrahim, who had come to Vernet-les-Bains for medical treatment. They then both traveled to Paris at the invitation of King Louis-Philippe. By decree of July 27, 1846, Soliman Pasha was awarded the title of Grand Officer of the Legion of Honor by King Louis-Philippe. He then followed Ibrahim to England, and upon his return, passed through France to visit his family in Lyon.

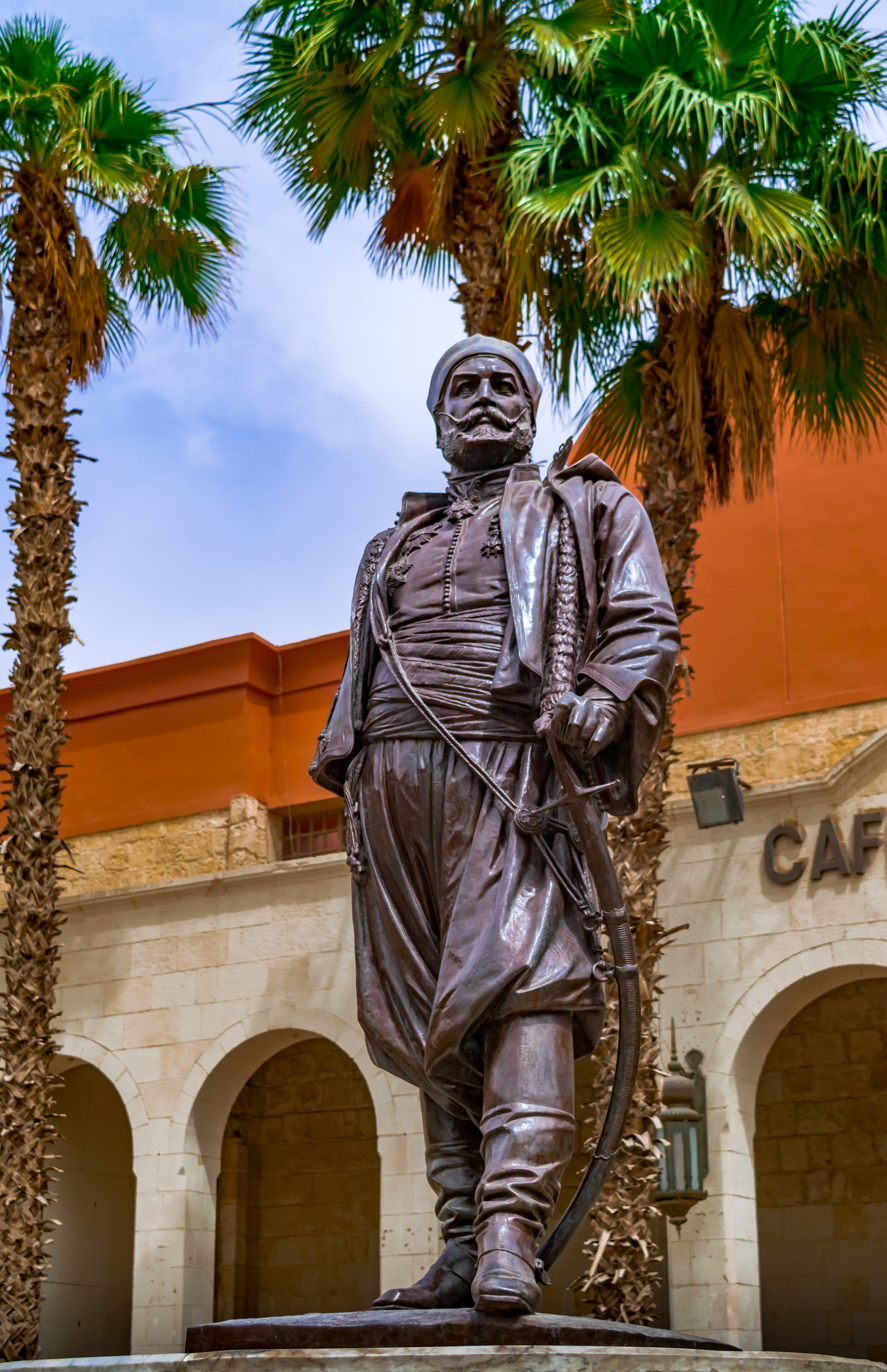

Following the death of Ibrahim in 1848 and Muhammad Ali a few months later, the latter's grandson, Abbas, succeeded him. He pursued a completely different policy than his grandfather, allying with the Turks, and was forced, against his will, to retain the prerogatives and rank of Soliman Pasha. Abbas, in turn, died and was succeeded by Said Pasha, Ibrahim's son. Soliman then fully regained his position and was able to carry out his duties unhindered.

Soliman Pasha died on March 12, 1860, from a severe attack of rheumatism, at the age of 71. He was buried in his garden in Old Cairo. There is a statue of him in the Egyptian National Military Museum inside the Cairo Citadel.

== Sources ==
- Vingtrinier, Aimé (1886). Soliman-Pacha, colonel Sève, généralissime des armées égyptiennes; ou, Histoire des guerres de l'ypte de 1820 à 1860. Avec un portrait [Soliman Pasha, Colonel Sève, Commander-in-Chief of the Egyptian Armies; or, History of the Wars of Egypt from 1820 to 1860. With a portrait] (in French). Paris: F. Didot.
- Michel, Isidore (24 May 2024). "De l'officier français du Premier Empire au Pacha de l'Egypte de Mehmet Ali : qui était le colonel Sève, futur Soliman Pacha". Les Clés du Moyen-Orient (in French).
- Vaughan, Marie (25 August 2023). "Suleiman al Faransawi – Joseph Anthelme Seve". Mara House Luxor.
- Abbara, Aly (16 January 2007). "Sulayman Pacha (al-Fransawi ou le français)". Aly Abbara (in French).
- "Soliman Pacha (1788-1860) : L'artisan de l'indépendance égyptienne". Tribune de Lyon (in French). 22 March 2021.
