= Battle of Konya =

1832 battle of the First Turko-Egyptian War

- Part of First Turko-Egyptian War
Date	21 December 1832
Location	Konya, Ottoman Empire
Result	Egyptian victory

Belligerents
Egypt Eyalet	Ottoman Empire

Commanders and leaders
Ibrahim Pasha	(Ottoman Empire) Reşid Mehmed Pasha (POW)

Strength
15,000 men 48 guns	50,000 men 24 guns

Casualties and losses
262 dead 530 wounded	3,000 dead 5,000 taken prisoner

The Battle of Konya was fought on December 21, 1832, between Egypt and the Ottoman Empire, just outside the city of Konya in modern-day Turkey. The Egyptians were led by Ibrahim Pasha, while the Ottomans were led by Reşid Mehmed Pasha. The Egyptians were victorious.

== Prelude ==
The Egyptian campaign to occupy Syria began on October 29, 1831, starting the First Turko-Egyptian War. Two armies set out from Egypt, one by land under General Ibrahim Yakan, and the other by sea, landing at Jaffa, under Ibrahim Pasha. The Egyptians rapidly occupied Jerusalem and the coastal regions of Palestine and Lebanon, except for Acre, which had impregnable walls and a strong garrison of about 3,000 hardened fighters with much artillery. Acre, under the Ottoman Pasha Abdullah Elgazar, held out against a long and bloody siege before finally falling to the Egyptians on May 27, 1832.

Later on, the Egyptian forces managed to successfully defeat the Ottoman forces throughout the Levant, in Damascus, Homs, Aleppo, Tripoli and the bellan pass. Due to their quick success, many cities towns in northern Syria and southern Turkey didn't risk fighting them but smoothly surrendered to the Egyptian forces.

The final battle of the campaign of 1831/1832, came at Konya on December 18–21, 1832. Several minor clashes between advanced elements and scouting parties of the two armies took place on December 18 and 19, and the main battle described below was on December 21.

== Opposing armies ==
Egyptian Forces: Ibrahim Pasha commanded a total of about 50,000 men in all of Greater Syria, including recent Syrian recruits and about 7,000 Arab auxiliaries and irregulars. The regular forces were organised into ten infantry regiments, twelve cavalry regiments and the artillery and engineers. Much of this force was spread out on his supply lines, and only 27,000 regular troops were available at the battle of Konya. However, these were the most experienced and disciplined of his army. At the battle, Ibrahim had 20 infantry battalions, 28 cavalry squadrons, and 48 guns.

Ottoman forces: Reshid Pasha commanded an army of 6,000 from various Ottoman provinces, including many Albanians and nizami troops (3,000) that came from the Shkodër region and Bosnians. At the battle Reshid had a total of about 6,000 men, of which about 2,000 were irregulars: 4 infantry battalions, 8 cavalry squadrons, and 24 guns.

== Field and order of battle ==
The main battle took place on December 21, 1832, astride the Konya-Constantinople road, just north of the ancient walled town of Konya, which, in 1832, had a population of about 20,000. The battlefield is bounded on the west by hills and on the east by marshes and swamps, with a plateau about two miles (3 km) wide in between. The Egyptian army had its back to the town and faced North, and the Ottoman army approached from the North astride the road, facing South. December 21 was an intensely foggy day.

Ibrahim's army was organised into three rows astride the road. The first row consisted of the 13th and 18th Infantry Regiments with three artillery batteries under Selim Elmansterly. The second row, five hundred paces behind the first, consisted of the 12th and 14th Infantry Regiments with two artillery batteries under Soliman al-Faransawy (al-Faransawy = "the Frenchman" the former Colonel Sèves). The third row, consisted of the Guards Regiment and one artillery battery in reserve and the 1st and 2nd Cavalry Regiment, under Selim bey. Ibrahim posted two battalions in square formation at the flanks to guard against encirclement.

Reshid's army was organised into four rows advancing astride the road. Leading the advance were two regular cavalry brigades and the Guards Infantry brigade in open formation. These were followed by a second row of two infantry and two cavalry brigades, then a third and fourth row each consisting of an infantry brigade. Large numbers of irregulars made up the rear. Artillery was distributed amongst the army.

At about noon the advancing Ottomans' artillery opened fire when the front lines were about 600 yards (550 m) apart. With the heavy fog, the range was spotty, and the Egyptian artillery held their fire until they could guess the Ottomans' positions from the sound of their cannonade, and so could find their range more precisely. As the artillery exchange thundered on, Ibrahim advanced with his scouts to a well east of the road to survey the Ottoman positions. During a momentary lifting of the fog, he noticed a gap in the Ottoman formation between their cavalry and infantry on their left flank, to the East. He rapidly called his reserves (the Guards Brigade and the two cavalry Brigades) and personally led them into this gap between the road and the marshes, causing confusion in the Ottoman left flank by this sudden onslaught, as some of their cavalry was trapped and scattered in the foggy marshes. As the Ottoman left flank collapsed, the grand vizier Reshid Pasha personally moved to their midst to rally them, but in the foggy confusion found himself surrounded by Egyptians and captured. The capture of their supreme commander deepened the confusion amongst the Ottomans, and some units lost cohesion and broke ranks as the Egyptian artillery and cavalry advanced around their left flank to their rear, enveloping the now disorganised units and continuing a relentless slaughter from three directions, South, East and North. As night fell, the new Ottoman commander managed to rally some units and organised a desperate counter-attack from the West against the Egyptian left flank, but this failed as the Egyptian centre wheeled to face them with an organised barrage of artillery and as this attack broke, the remaining Ottomans scattered.

== Aftermath ==
Konya was Ibrahim's greatest victory. He lost 262 dead and 530 wounded, whereas the Ottomans lost 3000 dead and over 5,000 taken prisoner, including many senior officers, including Reşid Mehmed Pasha. The Egyptians remained in possession of the field and took 46 guns, and the Ottoman army was scattered. Nothing remained between Ibrahim's army and Constantinople after the battle. However, it was time for politics, and Ibrahim's father, Muhammad Ali parleyed with Sultan Mahmoud and with the European Powers, and ended up signing the Convention of Kütahya, whereby the Sultan ceded greater Syria to Muhammad Ali for his lifetime, and ceded Egypt's rule to Muhammad Ali's dynasty in perpetuity, with nominal vassalhood to the Ottoman Sultan, but de facto independence. This dynasty only ended in July, 1952 with the abdication of King Farouk after the army coup led by Colonel Gamal Abd el Nasser.

However, seven years after Konya, the Ottoman Sultan Mahmoud abrogated the peace of Kotahiya and attacked the Egyptian forces again, but was again routed by the Egyptians at the Battle of Nezib, on the frontier between the Ottoman Empire and Syria, on June 24, 1839.
