= Battle of Beilan =

1832 battle in Turkey

- Part of Egyptian–Ottoman War (1831–1833)
Date	July 29, 1832
Location	Belen, Turkey
Result	Egyptian victory

Belligerents
Egypt Eyalet	Ottoman Empire

Commanders and leaders
Ibrahim Pasha	(Ottoman Empire) Agha Husseyin Pasha

Strength
Unknown	45,000 soldiers 160 artillery

Casualties and losses
Unknown	2,500 killed and wounded 2,000 captured

The Battle of Beilan (Turkish:Belen) is an engagement fought by the Egyptian army led by Ibrahim Pasha against the Ottoman army led by Hussein Pasha on July 29, 1832, during the Egyptian–Ottoman War (1831–1833). This battle lasted for 3 hours, the Ottoman army was defeated in a crushing defeat and Ibrahim Pasha captured Belen.

The Ottoman army forces prepared to confront their Egyptian counterparts, led by Ibrahim Pasha, in the series of wars between them, which Muhammad Ali Pasha began, to subject the Levant to his influence. The Ottoman army led by Hussein Pasha, and he was stationed In impregnable positions, it took its positions on the peaks of the Bailan Mountain, adding that the Egyptian army led by Ibrahim Pasha was in the confrontation, and camped in the flat plain under the Bailan Strait, and took infantry. Their positions are in the front rows, behind them are the cavalry and artillery in the middle, and behind these rows are the army's missions and equipment.

== Predule ==
The Ottoman army forces prepared to confront their Egyptian counterparts, led by Ibrahim Pasha, in the series of wars between them, which Muhammad Ali Pasha began, to subject the Levant to his influence. The Ottoman army was composed of about 45,000 fighters, of all weapons, and 160 artillery, led by Hussein Pasha, and he was stationed In impregnable positions, it took its positions on the peaks of the Bailan Mountains.

After the Ottoman armies fled in front of the Egyptian army in the Levant, and after Ibrahim Pasha took Homs, he continued his advance in order to seize Aleppo. On the way, he took Hama and continued to advance until he reached the Ottoman fortifications in Belen.

== The Ottoman Army ==
July 29 The Ottoman army, consisting of about 45,000 fighters of all weapons, and 160 cannons, led by Hussein Pasha, was stationed in impregnable positions—it took its positions on the peaks of the Belen Mountains. The infantry, consisting of five hordes, gathered on a plateau, the right end of which reached a rugged road that crossed the Amanus Mountains, coming from Khan Qarmut to Belen, and its left end, consisting of 14 infantry horts, reached the middle road from Antioch to Belen. As for the army's flank, it was stationed along that line next to this road, surmounted by some cannons placed on a hill near the road. The Ottomans set up some barriers and barriers in front of the infantry ranks, during which they distributed cannons.

== Egyptian army's plan ==
The Egyptian army camped in the flat plain, under the Strait of Belen, west of the road connecting Kilis and Antioch. The infantry took their positions in the front rows, behind them the cavalry and artillery in the middle, and behind these rows were the army's equipment and equipment.

Ibrahim Pasha discovered the Ottoman positions on Mount Belen, and found them impregnable, making it difficult for his forces to gain victory from them. On the evening of the 28th, he gathered a council of his officers to make their final decision on the plan to be implemented. Some of them decided to postpone the attack on the strait until the day after tomorrow, while others decided to carry out their attack tomorrow to prevent the enemy from strengthening its positions or having supplies reach it from Alexandretta. One of the good coincidences is that the technical advisor to Hussein Pasha fell into the hands of Ibrahim Pasha, the French captain Thevenin, after the capture of Aleppo, and the Ottomans were deprived of his assistance. The Council's decision ends with adopting the attack plan, the next day, and making a bypass movement around the Ottoman left flank, in preparation for surrounding it, then occupying some of the heights controlling the heart. He makes the Ottoman infantry a target for Egyptian artillery fire, and at the same time sends part of his forces to surround the right of the Ottomans and his plan was an image of what he followed in the Battle of Homs and the outflank plan required the following forces: 4 infantry vehicles, 3 cavalry vehicles, 4 field artillery batteries, and in another source, 2 artillery. Abu Ibrahim Pasha took it upon himself to lead these units, due to the importance of their role that needed to be implemented. The Emir of Alai Hasan Bey ordered Al-Manastarli to prepare for a direct attack on the heart and right of the Ottomans and to advance via the Belen of Antioch, at the head of Alai 14 and an artillery battery, so he advanced to the road and occupied the desired position while the fifth Alai Cavalry followed him as his reserve force in his attack on the right of the Ottoman army. As for the 2nd Cavalry Brigade, and the 6th Brigade, the armored spearmen, they were asked to work between the two aforementioned forces, and to assist one of them when necessary, while the 18th Brigade, the Infantry, and a field battery would be in reserve.
