= Siege of Kerak =

Siege of Kerak may refer to one of multiple sieges of Kerak Castle:

- Siege of Kerak (1173)
- Siege of Kerak (1183)
- Siege of Kerak (1184)
- Siege of Kerak (1187–1188)
- Siege of Al-Karak (1834)
