= Battle of Nezib =

Battle between Egypt and the Ottoman Empire (1839)

Coordinates: 37°1′N 37°48′E

- Part of the Egyptian–Ottoman War (1839–1841)
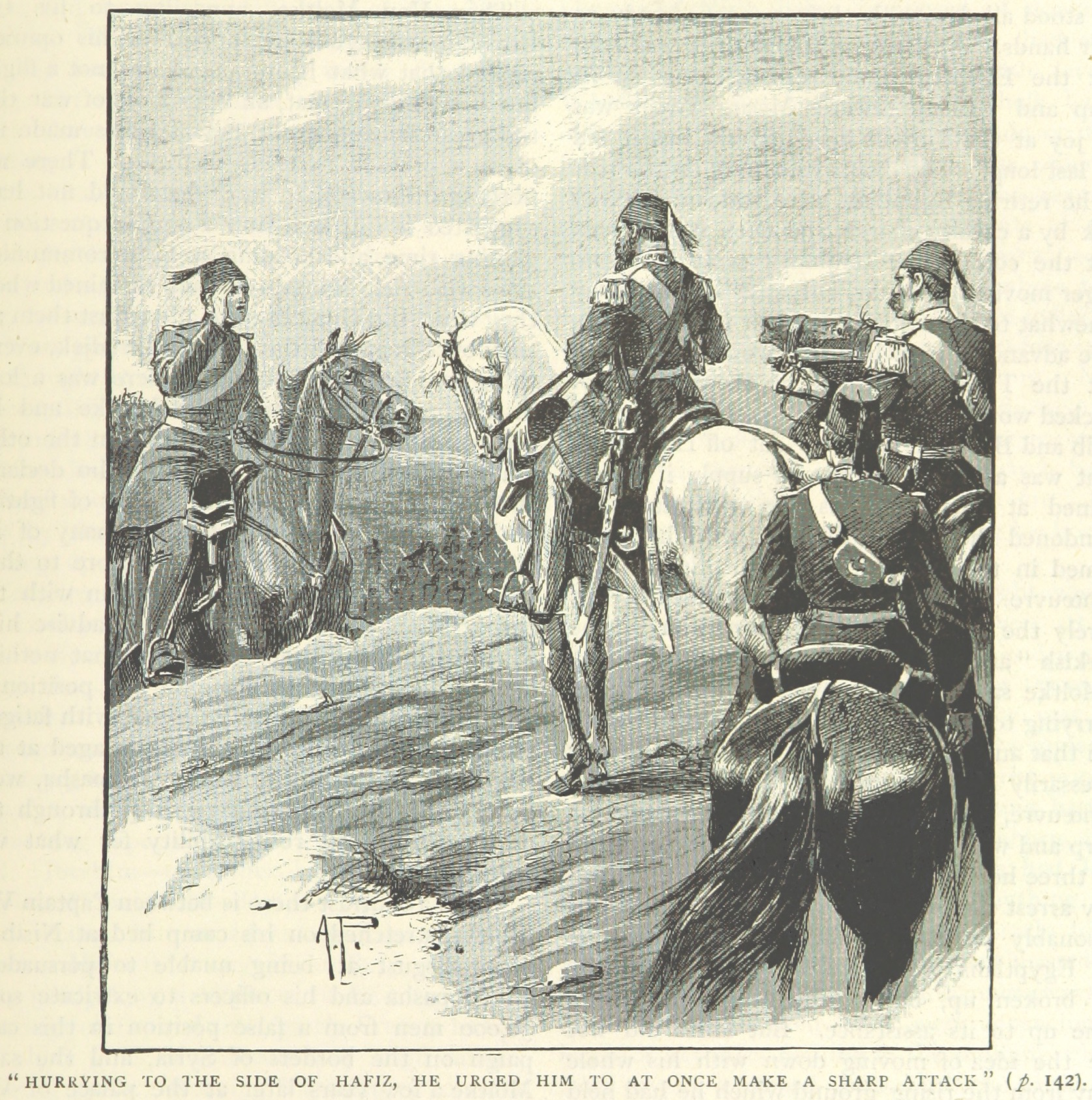
- Helmuth von Moltke (left) advises Hafiz Mehmed Pasha
Date	24 June 1839
Location	Mezar, southwest of Nezib, in south-central modern Turkey
Result	Egyptian victory

Belligerents
(Ottoman Egypt) Egypt	Ottoman Empire

Commanders and leaders
(Ottoman Egypt) Ibrahim Pasha of Egypt (Ottoman Egypt) Soliman Pasha al-Faransawi	(Ottoman Empire) Hafiz Mehmed Pasha; (Kingdom of Prussia) Captain Helmuth von Moltke

Strength
≈40,000 soldiers	≈40,000 soldiers

Casualties and losses
3,000 casualties	4,000 casualties 100 guns captured

The Battle of Nezib (Arabic: معركة نزب) (present-day Nizip in south-central modern Turkey) was fought on 24 June 1839 between the forces of the quasi-autonomous province of Ottoman Egypt and those of the Ottoman Empire. The Egyptians were led by Ibrahim Pasha, with Soliman Pasha al-Faransawi (a former French officer who had converted to Islam) commanding the right flank of the Egyptian army. The Ottomans were led by Hafiz Mehmed Pasha, with Helmuth von Moltke the Elder playing an advisory role in command of the Ottoman artillery. The battle ended in an Egyptian victory.

== Prelude ==
The Convention of Kütahya (May 1833) which concluded the First Egyptian–Ottoman War, did not satisfy the interests of both powers either in content or in results. The Ottoman sultan Mahmud II wished to revoke the concessions he had granted, take revenge on Muhammad Ali (the governor and de facto ruler of Egypt), and restore the prestige of the empire. Muhammad Ali, on the other hand, sought to further expand his territories beyond his recent conquests and gain complete independence from the Ottomans.

Both sides began to actively prepare for war: the Egyptians built fortresses, strengthened mountain passes with fortifications, purchased cannons and expanded the army. The Ottomans were also preparing for war, including the recruitment of Prussian Army officers, one of whom was the 38-year-old Captain Helmuth von Moltke. In the ranks of the Egyptian army was the former French officer Soliman Pasha al-Faransawi.

Hafiz Pasha was ordered to take a strong mountain position on the Turkish border, strengthen it and there await an uprising within Egyptian-controlled Syria, without engaging in battle at the beginning of the campaign or aiming for a general offensive, especially not on the plain. On the contrary, a pitched battle fought at the very beginning of a campaign would be disadvantageous. However, Hafiz Pasha disobeyed his orders, as he was extremely interested in participating in the battles according to Moltke's stories.

== Battle ==
Unable to risk attacking the fortified Turkish position from the front, Ibrahim Pasha decided to outflank it from the right. On 22 June 1839 he and the Egyptian army succeeded in executing this difficult and risky maneuver, and it took up position on the left bank of the Karzin river. The Prussian officers accompanying the Turkish army tried in vain to persuade Hafiz Pasha to either attack the Egyptian troops during their approach march or take up a new position, preventing their crossing of the Karzin. However, Hafiz Pasha could not abandon his fortifications, and only when the Egyptian army appeared behind the Turkish left flank, almost cutting off their retreat to Birecik, did he order a general march on the night of 23 June, taking up positions on the heights, with his rear facing his previous positions.

The battle began at 8:00 a.m. on 24 June. Approaching the village of Nezib, from where the Ottomans had rained well-aimed artillery fire on the Egyptians, Soliman Pasha ordered his troops to wheel left to outflank the Ottomans. The Egyptian batteries' return fire threw the Turkish left flank into confusion; Ibrahim Pasha, hoping to end the battle with one blow, charged the Turks with his left wing cavalry. Allowing the Egyptian cavalry to approach close, the Turks met them with intense fire and the Egyptians were quickly put to flight. Ibrahim launched another attack, but since his cavalry had also been put to flight, he would start thinking about his personal salvation. At this point, a fierce artillery battle erupted between the two armies; but the Egyptian artillery, which had been firing very rapidly, was forced to reduce its fire, as it was running low on ammunition. Panic spread among the Egyptian troops, and Ibrahim was in danger of defeat. At this critical moment, Prussian staff officers advised Hafiz Pasha to advance against the Egyptians. But while Hafiz Pasha hesitated, Soliman Pasha, supported by his adjutants, forced the Egyptian fugitives into line, sword in hand, under the deadly fire of the Turkish artillery.

After ammunition resupply arrived, the Egyptian artillery resumed firing. Meanwhile, the infantry of the Egyptian right wing was performing very successfully. Although the regular Turkish soldiers resisted with great tenacity, the Kurds and bashi-bazouks, unable to withstand the Egyptian artillery bombardment, fled, taking other units with them. Hafiz Pasha tried in vain to restore order, but the regular troops soon followed the irregulars in their rout. To conclude the battle, Soliman Pasha advanced with the Egyptian right wing troops, and his example was followed by the Egyptian center and left wing. This general offensive decided the battle, and the Turks were forced to retreat to Marash. The battle lasted about four hours. The Turkish losses amounted to 4,000 men killed and wounded, and they abandoned about 100 artillery pieces and their camp on the battlefield. Egyptian losses amounted to about 3,000 men.

== The two armies ==
Both armies were well-equipped and balanced. The number of soldiers in each army was approximately forty thousand men, supported by artillery and cavalry. However, the Egyptian army was trained in the latest European military methods in terms of organizing ranks, speed of movement and maneuvering. The leadership of Ibrahim Pasha and the presence of Soliman Pasha as chief of staff of the Egyptian army was also critical to the Egyptian victory. On the other hand, the Ottoman army had the advantage in terms of preparations, as it had more supplies and had been resting for several weeks in its camp, unlike the Egyptian soldiers who were exhausted by the march to meet the Ottoman army under the heat of the sun at the beginning of the summer.

According to a story, Bedir Khan Beg Emir of the principality of Bohtan who had been besieged by the forces of Hafiz Pasha during the Mir Muhammed Rebellion one year earlier, elected to seek forgiveness from the Ottoman sultan by sending 30,000 men to his service.

== Aftermath ==
The consequences of the Battle of Nezib were catastrophic for the Ottoman Empire. Following the defeat at Nezib, an already-ill Mahmud II died, and the Ottoman Navy defected to Egypt. The empire found itself on the brink of collapse, its territories either under the rule of Muhammad Ali or under Russian protection. But on French advice, Ibrahim Pasha refrained from advancing on Istanbul. However, this did not save Egypt from further European intervention.

== Bibliography ==
- Alison, Archibald, History of Europe from the Fall of Napoleon in 1815 to the Accession of Louis Napoleon in 1852, p. 538. W. Blackwood, 1856.
- Chisholm, Hugh, The Encyclopædia Britannica, p. 678. University of Virginia Press, 1911
- Masson, David, Macmillan's Magazine, p. 480. Macmillan and Co., 1882. Item notes: v.46 1882 May-Oct
