= Ibrahim Pasha of Egypt =

Egyptian general and Wāli of Egypt and Sudan (1789–1848)

Ibrahim Pasha
- إبراهيم
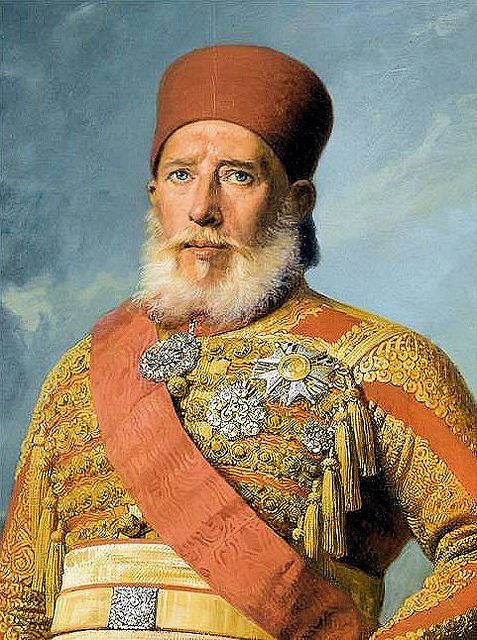
- Portrait by Charles-Philippe Larivière c. 1846

Wāli of Egypt
- In office 20 July 1848 – 10 November 1848
- Monarch: Abdülmecid I
- Preceded by: Muhammad Ali Pasha
- Succeeded by: Abbas Pasha

Prince of Upper Egypt
- In office 1811–1816

Personal details
- Born: 1789 Kavala or Nusratlı, Drama, Rumelia Eyalet, Ottoman Empire (present day Kavala, Greece)
- Died: 10 November 1848 (aged 58–59) Cairo, Egypt Eyalet
- Resting place: Hosh al-Basha Mausoleum of Imam al-Shafi'i, Cairo, Egypt
- Spouse(s): Ulfet Qadin; Gulzar Qadin; Sara Qadin
- Children: Prince Muhammed Bey; Prince Ahmed Rifaat Pasha; Isma'il, Khedive of Egypt; Prince Mustafa Fazil Pasha
- Parents: Muhammad Ali Pasha (father); Amina Hanim (mother)
- House: Alawiyya

Military service
- Allegiance: Ottoman Empire (formerly); Egypt Eyalet
- Branch/service: Ottoman Army (formerly); Egyptian Army
- Commands: Commander-in-Chief of the Egyptian Army
- Battles/wars: List: Ottoman-Saudi War; Expedition to Najd (1817–1818); Battle Of Mawiyya (1817); Siege of Diriyah; Greek War of Independence; Third siege of Missolonghi; Battle of Kremmydi; Battle of Sphacteria (1825); Battle of Maniaki; Battle of the Lerna Mills; Egyptian–Ottoman War (1831–1833); Siege of Akka (1832); Battle of Hims (1832); Battle of Belen Pass; Battle of Konya; Battle of Beilan; Peasants' revolt in Palestine; Battle of Hebron; Siege of Al-Karak (1834); Egyptian–Ottoman War (1839–1841); Battle of Nezib

Ibrahim Pasha (Arabic: إبراهيم باشا Ibrāhīm Bāshā; 1789 – 10 November 1848) was an Egyptian general and politician; he was the commander of both the Egyptian and Ottoman armies and the eldest son of Muhammad Ali, the Ottoman Wāli and unrecognized Khedive of Egypt and Sudan. He was the second ruler of Egypt from the Muhammad Ali dynasty and ruled from 20 July 1848 to 10 November 1848.

Ibrahim served as a general in the Egyptian army that his father established during his reign, taking his first command of Egyptian forces when he was merely a teenager. In the final year of his life, he was appointed Regent for his still-living father and became the effective ruler of Egypt and Sudan, owing to the latter's ill health. His rule also extended over the other dominions that his father had brought under Egyptian rule, namely Syria, Hejaz, Morea, Thasos, and Crete. Ibrahim pre-deceased his father, dying 10 November 1848, only four months after rising to power. He was succeeded as Regent by his nephew (son of Muhammad Ali's second oldest son), Abbas, who upon Muhammad Ali's death the following year inherited the Egyptian throne.

Ibrahim remains one of the most celebrated members of the Muhammad Ali dynasty, particularly for his impressive military victories, including several crushing defeats of the Ottoman Empire, which placed him among the most outstanding commanders in military history. Among Egyptian historians, Ibrahim, his father Muhammad Ali, and his son Isma'il the Magnificent are held in far higher esteem than other rulers from the dynasty, who were largely viewed as indolent and corrupt; this is largely the result of efforts by his grandson Fuad I of Egypt to ensure the positive portrayal of his paternal ancestors in the Royal Archives that he created, which were the primary source for Egyptian history from the 1920s until the 1970s. Today, a statue of Ibrahim occupies a prominent position in Egypt's capital, Cairo.

== Background ==
His mother was Amina Hanim (1770–1824). She was the widow of Ottoman official Serezli Ali Bey, and a daughter of the Ottoman Major Ali Aga of Nusratli. Ibrahim was her first-born son with Muhammad Ali of Egypt (her first born was Princess Tawhida). It is further known that he was born in the village of Nusratli (today Nikiforos), near the town of Drama, the Ottoman province of Rumelia, in what is now the eastern parts of Macedonian region in Greece. Ibrahim was of Albanian origin through his father Muhammad.

In 1805, during his father's struggle to establish himself as ruler of Egypt, the adolescent Ibrahim, at 16, was sent as a hostage to the Ottoman Kapudan Pasha. However, Ibrahim was allowed to return to Egypt once his father was recognised as Wāli of Egypt by the Ottoman Sultan, and had defeated the British military expedition of Major General Alexander Mackenzie Fraser.

When Muhammad Ali went to Arabia to prosecute the war against the Al Saud in 1813, Ibrahim continued the war against the broken power of the Mameluks, whom he suppressed as he had been appointed Prince of Upper Egypt from 1811 to 1816, with Girga as his seat. In 1816 he succeeded his brother Tusun Pasha in command of the Egyptian forces in Arabia.

Ibrahim Pasha, was the subject of much speculation and rumors, particularly regarding his feelings toward the Turks and the Ottoman State. He considered himself an Arab and spoke Arabic and respected the Arabs, while he despised the Ottomans and the Turks. This was at a time when one of the Egyptians in his army heard him and asked how he could say such things when he himself was Turkish. He replied:

I am not a Turk, I came as a mere child to Egypt, and since then the Egyptian sun has changed my blood and made me wholly Arab.

== Campaigns against the house of Saud ==
Muhammad Ali had already begun to introduce European discipline into his army, and Ibrahim had probably received some training, but his first campaign was conducted more in the old Asiatic style than his later operations. The campaign lasted two years, and ended in the destruction of the House of Saud as a political power. Muhammad Ali landed at Yanbu, the port of Medina, in 1813. The holy cities had been recovered from the Saudis, and Ibrahim's task was to follow them into the desert of Nejd and destroy their fortresses. Such training as the Egyptian troops had received, and their artillery, gave them a marked superiority in the open field. But the difficulty of crossing the desert to the Saudis stronghold of Diriyah, some 400 miles east of Medina, made the conquest a very arduous one. By the end of September 1818 he had forced the Saudi leader Abdullah bin Saud to surrender, and had taken Diriyah, which he sacked. Ibrahim pasha was called in Egyptian “Qahir Al Wahhabiyyin” (annihilator of the wahhabis) for his brutality against Wahhabis.

== Operations in the Morea ==
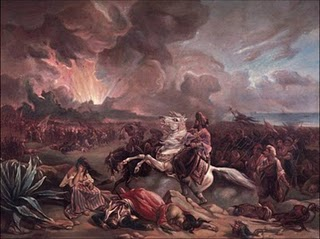
Ibrahim Pasha attacks Missolonghi in the year 1826, (by Giuseppe Pietro Mazzola).

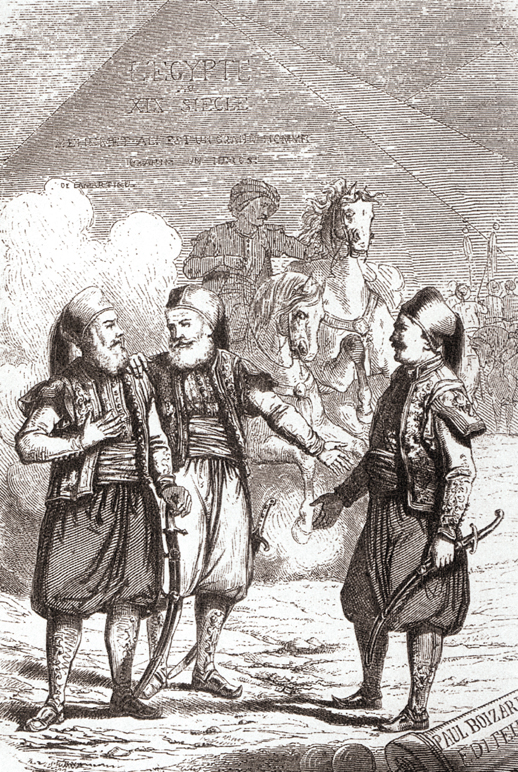
Ibrahim Pasha, with father Muhammad Ali Pasha and Colonel Sève (Suleiman Pasha, right).

On 11 December 1819 he made a triumphal entry into Cairo. After his return Ibrahim gave effective support to the Frenchman, Colonel Sève (Suleiman Pasha), who was employed to drill the army on the European model. Ibrahim set an example by submitting to be drilled as a recruit. In 1824, Muhammad Ali was appointed governor of the Morea (the Peloponnese peninsula in southern Greece) by Ottoman Sultan Mahmud II. Mahmud actually required the assistance of the well-trained Egyptian Army against the contemporary Greek Revolution, which his forces had been unable to quell: in 1822 the Greeks had decisively defeated an army of some 30,000 men under Sultanzade Mahmud Dramali Pasha.

Ibrahim was sent to the Peloponnese with a squadron and an army of 17,000 men. The expedition sailed on 4 July 1824, but was for some months unable to do more than come and go between Rhodes and Crete. The fear of the Greek fire ships stopped his way to the Morea. When the Greek sailors mutinied from want of pay, Ibrahim was able to land at Modon on 26 February 1825. He remained in the Morea until the capitulation of 1 October 1828 was forced on him by the intervention of the Western powers.

He defeated the Greeks in the open field, and though the siege of Missolonghi proved costly to his own troops and to the Ottoman forces who operated with him, he brought it to a successful termination on 24 April 1826. But he was defeated in Mani three times in a row. The Greek guerrilla bands harassed his army, and in revenge he desolated the country and sent thousands of the inhabitants into slavery in Egypt. These measures of repression aroused great indignation in Europe and led to the intervention of the naval squadrons of the United Kingdom, the Restored Kingdom of France and Russia in the Battle of Navarino (20 October 1827). Their victory was followed by the landing of a French expeditionary force in the so-called Morea expedition. By the terms of the capitulation of 1 October 1828, Ibrahim evacuated the country.

== Campaigns in Syria ==
In 1831, his father's quarrel with the Porte having become flagrant, Ibrahim was sent to conquer Ottoman Syria. He took Acre after a severe siege on 27 May 1832, occupied Damascus, defeated an Ottoman army at Homs on 8 July, defeated another Ottoman army at Beilan on 29 July, invaded Asia Minor, and finally routed the Grand Vizier Reşid Mehmed Pasha at Konya on 21 December. It was there in Syria where he met Umar Tal the mystic, according to accounts Umar Tal healed the son of Ibrahim Pasha from a deadly fever. Umar Tal was inspired by Ibrahim Pasha, when Umar returned to Sokoto he followed the trends set by the Pasha. Umar Tal later became the commander of the Toucouleur in what is now Guinea, Senegal, and Mali.

The Convention of Kütahya on 6 May left Syria for a time in the hands of Muhammad Ali. Ibrahim was undoubtedly helped by Colonel Sève and the European officers in his army. After the campaign of 1832 and 1833, Ibrahim remained as governor in Syria. During his governorship, Ibrahim Pasha's rule also extended to Mount Lebanon, where he reaffirmed Bashir Shihab in his rule over Mount Lebanon and replaced indirect Ottoman rule with a more coercive and centralized Egyptian regime. He might perhaps have administered successfully, but the exactions he was compelled to enforce by his father soon caused the popularity of his government to decline and provoked revolts. These exactions included intensified taxation, conscription, disarmament, deforestation and corvée labor policies, which contributed to revolts in Palestine, Syria, and Mount Lebanon from 1834 until the collapse of Egyptian rule. He was assisted by French officer Beaufort d'Hautpoul from 1834 to 1837, who was his Chief-of-Staff.

During the 1834 peasants' revolt in Palestine, Ibrahim Pasha besieged the Transjordanian city of Al-Karak for 17 days, in pursuit of the revolt's leader Qasim al-Ahmad. After a hole was blasted into the town's walls in late August, Al-Karak was destroyed and the orchards outside the town were uprooted as punitive measures against the residents for hosting Qasim. Fearing further retaliation from Ibrahim Pasha, the rebel leaders were handed to the Egyptians.

In 1838, the Sublime Porte felt strong enough to renew the struggle, and war broke out once more. Ibrahim won his last victory for his father at Nezib on 24 June 1839. But the United Kingdom and the Austrian Empire intervened to preserve the integrity of the Ottoman Empire. Their squadrons cut his communications by sea with Egypt, a general revolt isolated him in Syria, and he was finally compelled to evacuate the country in February 1841. In Mount Lebanon, opposition to conscription and disarmament helped produce a revolt in 1840 that initially united Druzes and Christians against Egyptian rule.

The Karakis were to take their revenge from Ibrahim Pasha, 6 years later when the Pasha and his Egyptian army were driven out of Damascus. In 1841, as the Pasha and his troops took the Hajj road from Damascus to Qunaytra, they were persistently attacked all the way from Qatraneh to Gaza. The weary army were killed and robbed, and by the time Ibrahim Pasha reached Gaza, the commander had lost most of his army, ammunition and animals.

== Last years ==
Ibrahim spent the rest of his life in peace, but his health was ruined. In 1846, he paid a visit to Western Europe, where he was received with some respect and a great deal of curiosity. When his father became senile, Ibrahim was appointed Regent in his place. He held his regency from July till the time of his death on 10 November 1848.

== Honours ==
- Knight of the Order of Saint Joseph of Tuscany-1845
- Grand Cross of the Legion d'Honneur of France-1845
- Grand Cross of the Order of the Tower and Sword (GCTE) of Portugal-1846

== Legacy ==
In 1872, the Khedive Ismail decided to erect a huge statue of Ibrahim Pasha by the famous artist Charles Cordier to celebrate his victories. However, the Ottomans objected to the two reliefs because they depicted their defeat by the Egyptians, so the statue was erected without them. In 1948, on the centenary of his death, the Egyptian government rebuilt the reliefs, and the complete statue now rests in one of Cairo's most famous squares.

Also, another statue of Ibrahim Pasha stands at the entrance of the Egyptian National Military Museum, greeting visitors and reflecting his great importance in Egyptian military history.

== See also ==
- Casemates of İbrahim Pasha

== Bibliography ==
- See Edouard Gouin, L'Egypte au XIX' siècle (Paris, 1847); Aimé Vingtrinier, Soliman-Pasha (Colonel Sève) (Paris, 1886). A great deal of unpublished material of the highest interest with regard to Ibrahim's personality and his system in Syria is preserved in the British Foreign Office archives; for references to these see Cambridge Mod. Hist. x. 852, bibliography to chap. xvii.
- Bodart, Gaston (1908). Militär-historisches Kriegs-Lexikon (1618–1905) (in German). Vienna and Leipzig: C. W. Stern.

Ibrahim Pasha of Egypt Muhammad Ali dynasty Born: 1789 Died: 10 November 1848
Preceded by Muhammad Ali Pasha	Wāli of Egypt and Sudan; 1848	Succeeded by Abbas Hilmi I
