= Battle of Belen Pass =

1832 Egyptian victory over the Ottomans

- Part of Egyptian–Ottoman War (1831–1833)
Date	29/30 July 1832
Location	Belen Pass
Result	Egyptian victory

Belligerents
Egypt	Ottoman Empire

Commanders and leaders
Ibrahim Pasha	Hussein Pasha

Strength
14,000 men	17,000–45,000 men, 160 cannons

Casualties and losses
500 dead and wounded	2,500 killed and wounded 1,500–2,000 captured 25–39 cannons captured

The Battle of Belen Pass was a military engagement between the Egyptian army of Ibrahim Pasha and the Ottoman army of Hussein Pasha. The Ottoman army suffered a serious setback, causing them to lose Syria to the Egyptians.

== Background ==
Having won his victory at the battle of Homs, Ibrahim occupied Hama and Aleppo and then headed for the Beilan mountain pass, situated between Antakiyah (Antioch) and Alexandretta. The pass was the key to the heart of the Ottoman Empire, Asia Minor, and here were stationed the main forces of the Turkish army, under the command of serdar-i-Akram, Hussein Pasha. The Ottoman army had a force of 17,000 men or 45,000 men and 160 guns. The Egyptians had a force of 14,000 men. Examining the Ottoman position, he determined that facing them face-to-face was impossible, instead, he decided to flank their left wing and occupy the mounds positioned in the center while also sending another force to outflank their right wing.

== Battle ==
Ibrahim led the force towards the left wing. His march was difficult given the rough passages there as they had to endure hardship climbing upwards. The Ottoman noticed their advance and began boarding them, Ibrahim responded with fire cannons. The Egyptians continued their march and passed the Ottoman left-wing area. The Egyptians then occupied the mounds that protected and oversaw the Left-wing position. They placed their cannons and bombarded them, causing heavy casualties to the Ottomans. Meanwhile, another force of Egyptians attacked the Ottomans in the center, similar thing happened on the right. These attacks caused disorder in the Ottoman army and began retreating from their positions. The Ottomans were dispersed in the mountains. The battle happened on 29/30 July.

== Aftermath ==
The victory made the Egyptians the unchallenged lords in Syria. The Egyptian troops entered Anatolia. They occupied Adana and then proceeded westwards. The Sultan dismissed Hussein Pasha and appointed Mohammed Reshid Pasha as commander-in-chief. The Ottomans lost 2,500 killed and wounded, 1,500-2,000 prisoners, and 25-39 cannons. The Egyptians suffered 500 killed and wounded.

== Sources ==
- Lutsky, Vladimir (1969). "Mohammed Ali's Struggle for Syria and Palestine. Egypt's Defeat".
- Bodart, Gaston (1908). Militär-historisches Kriegs-Lexikon (1618–1905) (in German). Vienna and Leipzig: C. W. Stern. Retrieved 1 July 2023.
- E.J. Brill (1987), E.J. Brill's First Encyclopaedia of Islam, 1913–1936, Vol I.
- Abd al-Rahman al-Rafai, The era of Muhammad Ali.
