= Battle of Mawiyya (1817) =

- Part of the Ottoman–Wahhabi war's Najd Expedition
Date	1817
Location	Mawiyya, Najd (Central Arabia)
Result	Ottoman-Egyptian victory

Belligerents
Ottoman Empire; Eyalet of Egypt; Support: Certain Arab Tribes	Emirate of Diriyah

Commanders and leaders
(Ottoman Empire) Ibrahim Pasha	Abdullah Ibn Saud

Strength
Unknown	Unknown

Casualties and losses
Unknown	200 killed

The Battle of Mawiyya in 1817 was part of the Third Campaign of the Ottoman–Wahhabi war. During the campaign, the forces of the Emirate of Diriyah were led by Abdullah Ibn Saud and the forces of the Ottoman Empire were led by Ibrahim Pasha. It ended with Ibrahim's victory.

== Background ==
Following a setback, Arab tribes aligned themselves with the Ottomans when Ibrahim deployed 1,000 men to address attacks on his caravans by certain tribes in Sowaidrah. they pledged support, offering camels. Subsequently, Ibrahim fortified Al Hinakiyah, establishing it as a strategic base before advancing toward Ar Rass.

== Battle ==
In response to Ibrahim's actions, Abdullah bin Saud Al Saud initiated the mobilization of his military forces, meticulously preparing for a confrontation. Departing from Diriyah, he strategically positioned himself in Ar Rass, using it as a central base for engaging the Ottomans in a decisive battle.

Upon learning of the Ottoman forces' advance towards Mawiyyha in proximity to Al Hinakiyah, Abdullah swiftly orchestrated a preemptive strike. At the break of dawn near Mawiyyah, Abdullah's forces launched a surprise attack, catching the Ottomans off guard. The Ottomans, compelled to retreat to their encampment, found themselves pursued relentlessly by the Saudis. As the Saudis closed in on the Ottoman camp, the latter resorted to bombardment, compelling the Saudis to alter their course. Regrettably, the Saudis incurred a loss of 200 men in the ensuing conflict, prompting Abdullah to make a strategic withdrawal to Unaizah.

== Aftermath ==
Following their triumph in Mawiyyah, the Ottomans proceeded to Ar Rass and initiated a siege. In response, Ibrahim meticulously readied his artillery, preparing to invest the fortress in a strategic maneuver.
