= Siege of Al-Karak (1834) =

1834 Siege of Al-Karak
- Part of Peasants' Revolt of 1834 (Palestine)
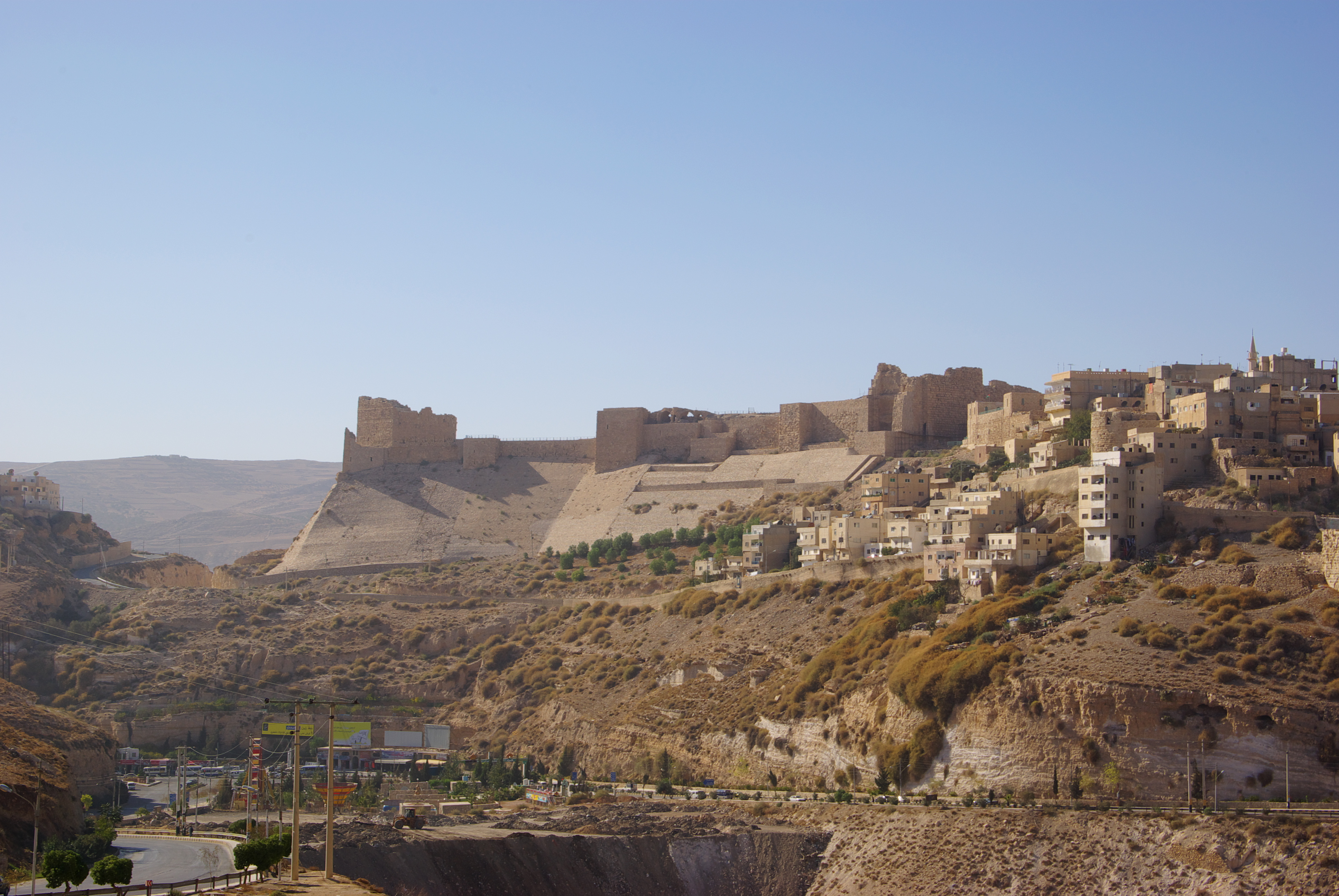
- Kerak Castle
Location
Result
Al-Karak, Transjordan
31.180556°N 35.701389°E
- Egyptian victory
- Al-Karak and nearby towns looted
- Qasim al-Ahmad captured
- Execution and imprisonment of rebels

Belligerents
Egypt Eyalet	Al-Karak inhabitants

Commanders and leaders
Ibrahim Pasha; Rashad Bey	Muhammad Majali
- Location within Jordan

The Siege of Al-Karak was a 17-day siege imposed by Ibrahim Pasha of Egypt on the Transjordanian town of Al-Karak in 1834. The Pasha laid the siege on the town in pursuit of Qasim al-Ahmad, the leader of the Peasants' revolt in Palestine, who had fled from Nablus to take shelter in Al-Karak.

Egyptian troops looted the town and the countryside for five days, while Karak's famous fortifications were shelled with gunpowder and the town was reduced to ruins. The Karakis took vengeance upon the Pasha and his Egyptian army when Ibrahim Pasha was driven out of Syria, six years after the siege.

== Background ==
The Peasants' Revolt was a rebellion against Egyptian conscription and taxation policies in Palestine. While rebel ranks consisted mostly of the local peasantry, urban notables and Bedouin tribes also formed an integral part of the revolt, which was a collective reaction to Egypt's gradual elimination of the unofficial rights and privileges previously enjoyed by the various classes of society in the Levant under Ottoman rule.

As part of Muhammad Ali's modernization policies, Ibrahim Pasha, the Egyptian governor of the Levant, issued conscription orders for a fifth of all Muslim males of fighting age. Encouraged by rural sheikh Qasim al-Ahmad, the urban notables of Nablus, Hebron and the Jerusalem-Jaffa area did not abide by Ibrahim Pasha's orders to conscript, disarm and tax the local peasantry. The religious notables of Safad followed suit. Qasim and other leaders of local clans rallied their kinsmen and launched a revolt against the authorities in May 1834, taking control of several towns. While the core of the fighting was in the central mountain regions of Palestine (Samaria and Judea), the revolt also spread to the Galilee, Gaza and parts of Transjordan. Jerusalem was briefly captured by the rebels and plundered. Faced with the superior firepower and organization of Ibrahim Pasha's troops, the rebels were defeated in Jabal Nablus, Jerusalem and the coastal plain before their final defeat in Hebron, which was leveled. Afterward, Ibrahim Pasha's troops pursued and captured Qasim in al-Karak, which was under siege for 17 days.

== The siege ==
Qasim al-Ahmad, the revolt leader, sons Yusuf and Muhammad, and Isa al-Barqawi fled Hebron during the fighting and headed east across the Jordan River. They were sheltered in Al-Karak by a Bedouin clan affiliated with the Anizzah tribal confederation. Ibrahim Pasha's troops pursued them and laid siege on Al-Karak for 17 days. After a hole was blasted into the town's walls in late-August, the town was destroyed and the countryside was uprooted as punitive measures against the residents for hosting Qasim. Fearing further retaliation from Ibrahim Pasha, the Anizzah clan's chief, Duwaikhi Al-Samir, handed over the rebel leaders to the Egyptians.

== Aftermath ==
Ibrahim Pasha's forces looted villages as he went northward to Al-Salt. After Qasim's capture, Arsab Al-Kahol (one of Qasim's lieutenants) was publicly executed in Damascus. Qasim's sons Yusuf and Muhammad were executed in Acre. His two youngest sons Uthman and Ahmad were exiled to Cairo. Ibrahim Pasha also had several other rebellious sheikhs (chiefs) executed in Damascus, including Isa al-Amr of Dura, Ali Rabbah and Abd al-Jabir Barghouti of Bani Zeid, Yusuf Salama of Seluh, Ismail ibn Simhan of Ras Karkar and Ismail Majali of al-Karak. Several other sheikhs were jailed in Acre.

== Vengeance ==
During Ibrahim Pasha's withdrawal from Syria, six years after the siege, the people of Karak managed to take vengeance from the Pasha and his Egyptian army. In 1840, as the Pasha and his troops were driven out of Damascus, the Karakis attacked them all the way from Qatraneh to Gaza, along the King's Highway (Hajj route). The forces were raided, and the Pasha lost most of his men, ammunition, and animals by the time he reached Gaza.
