= Siege of Akka (1832) =

1831–32 siege of the Egyptian–Ottoman war

Siege and storming of Akka
- Part of Egyptian–Ottoman War (1831–1833)
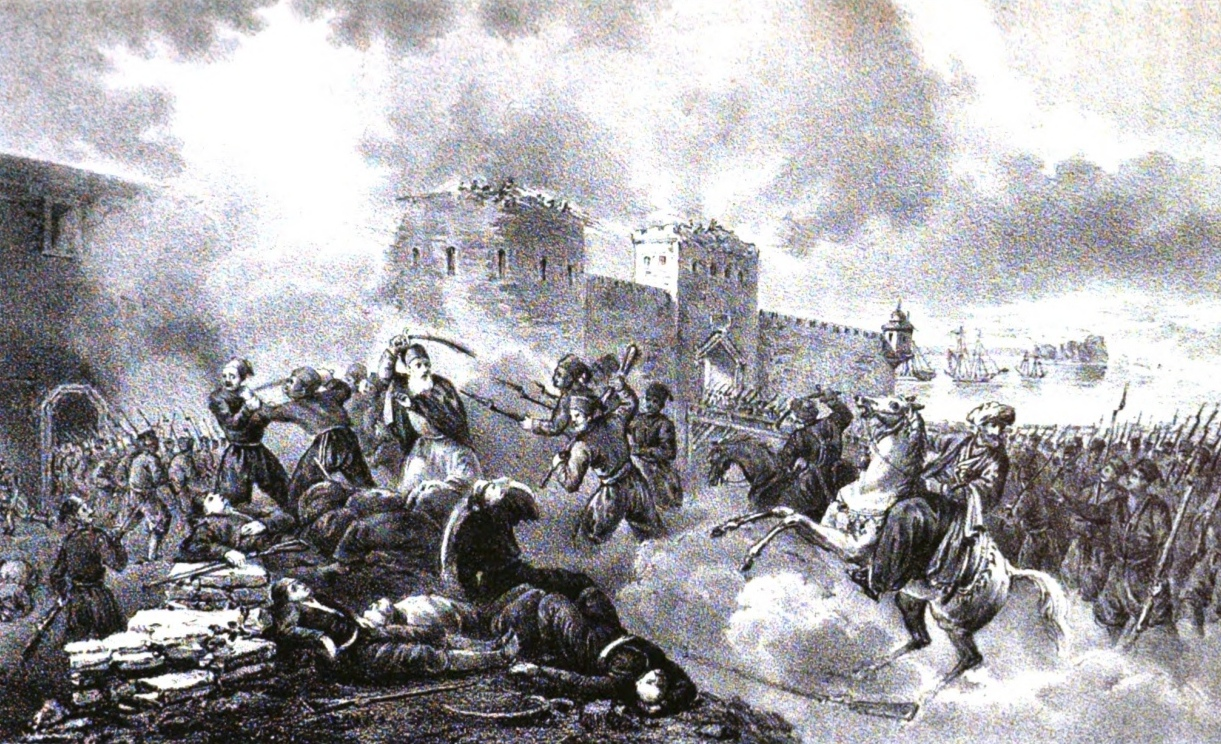
- The Captured of Acre on 27 May 1832
Date	26/29 November 1831 – 27 May 1832
Location	Acre, Sidon Eyalet, Syria
Result	Egyptian victory Full results: Ottoman victory – 1st Egyptian assault; Ottoman victory – 2nd Egyptian assault; Egyptian victory – 3rd Egyptian assault

Belligerents
Egypt	Ottoman Empire

Commanders and leaders
(Ottoman Egypt) Ibrahim Pasha	(Ottoman Empire) Abdullah Pasha (POW) (Ottoman Empire) Osman Pasha

Strength
20,000 men	4,000–6,000 men

Casualties and losses
2,000–4,500 casualties	1,400 dead and 2,600 wounded or 6,000 casualties, of whom 400 captured

The siege of Akka took place between 26 or 29 November 1831 and 27 May 1832 as part of the First Egyptian–Ottoman War in the eponymous Syrian town of Akka,—the capital of Sidon Eyalet,—also known as Acre, 125 km (78 mi) northwest of Jerusalem, which was then under Ottoman rule. Egyptian troops of Ibrahim Pasha successfully besieged and stormed the troops of Abdullah Pasha.

The Egyptians made the best of the time factor as per historian V. B. Lutsky. In October 1831, Ibrahim launched a military campaign. Around two to three weeks later, after not having encountered serious resistance, Egyptian troops occupied Gaza, Jaffa, Haifa, and, at the end of November 1831, advanced on Akka, the fortress which had once barred Napoleon's path in 1799. Following a six-months long siege, Akka fell to the Egyptians. By this time, the main Egyptian forces were far away in the north.

== Siege ==
At the beginning of the siege, Ibrahim experienced incredible luck. As Charles Napier noted, if a storm had arisen, not a single ship would have been able to return to Alexandria. In accordance with the Egyptian plans Acre was besieged by sea and land. On December 9 an attempt was made to overwhelm the place with a com-bined bombardment from the shipping and the land batteries. But the ships suffered considerable damage and the land batteries made small impression.

On March 7, a second assault on the fortress began. The Egyptians launched several attacks but were repelled with heavy losses. Abdullah Pasha even personally participated in the battle with his best troops. Abdullah may not have been particularly honest or wise, but he was a brave and decisive man, and the siege in its early stages was conducted with great skill. A party of the stormers penetrated to the market place, but finding themselves unsupported had to withdraw. Ultimately, the Egyptian forces retreated, suffering 1,200 casualties. The ships that participated in the battle, seriously damaged, sailed to Alexandria for repair. Ibrahim's position began to appear critical.

At the end of March, Osman Pasha's army, several thousand strong, arrived in Tripoli. However, during his first attempt to take it, he was defeated and forced to retreat. A battalion was sent after him to pursue Osman Pasha. In the ensuing clash, both armies were forced to retreat to their camps.

Ibrahim Pasha, concerned about the situation in Tripoli, delegated command to one of his generals and set out for Tripoli with an army of 8,000 and six cannons. Almost as soon as Ibrahim appeared before the Turks, Osman Pasha fled, joining forces with the Pasha of Aleppo. After arriving in Tripoli, he advanced on Homs. However, facing unexpected resistance from Serasker Mehmed Pasha, he was forced to retreat to Khan-Kassir. There, he encountered the combined forces of three pashas and engaged in battle. After several hours of fighting, Ibrahim was forced to withdraw from the battlefield, suffering heavy losses.

Abdullah Pasha, learning that Ibrahim Pasha's main forces were in the Lebanese mountains at the time, decided to make a sortie. Having lured the Egyptian army under the fortress, the remaining troops in Acre emerged and opened fire on the Egyptians. The besiegers were soon surrounded and routed, in the meantime, Abdallah successfully captured some of the Egyptian artillery.. The Egyptian troops retreated, giving Abdullah time to restore the fortress's fortifications.

Following these events, Ibrahim Pasha returned to the siege of Acre, and on May 19, he began a massive shelling on the fortress. By that time, Acre was practically destroyed.

At dawn on May 27 Ibrahim directed the storming party in person. A long struggle ensued. Ibrahim is related to have cut down with his own hand several officers who had fallen into the rear of the storming columns, and after great efforts he had by nightfall succeeded in capturing the place, which was then, in strict accordance with western rules of war, given up to plunder. Abdullah proudly declared: “When Ibrahim took it the walls had been destroyed ; of my 6000 men 5600 were dead, and of my treasure nothing remained but a few jewels”. After the siege, of Abdullah Pasha who was sent as a prisoner of war to Egypt. Egyptian losses are estimated at 2,000, although there are reports of losses as high as 4,500.

== Notes and references ==
=== References ===
- Bodart, Gaston (1908). Militär-historisches Kriegs-Lexikon (1618–1905) (in German). Vienna and Leipzig: C. W. Stern.
- Lutsky, Vladimir (1969). "Mohammed Ali's Struggle for Syria and Palestine. Egypt's Defeat". In Daglish, Robert (ed.). Modern History of the Arab Countries. Translated by Nasser, Lika. Moscow: Progress Publishers.
- Aksan, Virginia (2007). Ottoman Wars 1700-1870: An Empire Besieged. Routledge Taylor & Francis Group – via Google Books.
- Dodwell, Henry (1931). The founder of modern Egypt. Cambridge at the university press – via Archive Internet.
- Muravyov-Karsky, Nikolay (1869). Турция и Египет в 1832 и 1833. Harvard University – via Google Books.
- Napier, Charles (1842). The war in Syria. John Parker – via Google Books.
