= Battle of Hims (1832) =

Battle during the Egyptian–Ottoman War

Battle of Homs
- Part of Egyptian–Ottoman War (1831–1833)
- Battle plan for Homs, July 9 1832
Date	9 July 1832
Location	Homs, Syria
Result	Egyptian victory

Belligerents
(Ottoman Egypt) Egypt Eyalet	Ottoman Empire

Commanders and leaders
(Ottoman Egypt) Ibrahim Pasha	(Ottoman Empire) Mehmed Pasha

Strength
16,000 soldiers 44 cannons	20,000 soldiers 40 cannons

Casualties and losses
100–500 dead and wounded	>4,000–5,000 men dead, wounded, or captured; up to 3,000 dead and wounded; up to 2,000 captured; 24 cannons captured

The Battle of Homs was fought on 8 or 9 July 1832 as part of the Egyptian–Ottoman War (1831–1833) at the eponymous Syrian town of Homs (also known as Hims and Emesa), 140 km (87 mi) north of Damascus, then in Ottoman territory. Ibrahim's Ottoman Egyptian troops routed the troops of Pasha of Aleppo, who lost all their artillery and transports.

Having triumphed in Homs, Ibrahim occupied Hama and Aleppo, heading for the Belen Pass, situated between Antakiyah and Scanderoon. This pass was the key to the heart of Ottoman Turkey, Asia Minor.

== Prelude ==
After the fall of Acre, Ibrahim moved on to Damascus, which lay in a lush valley, lacking any significant fortifications and completely controlled from the heights of Salahiya. Damascus was abandoned to him without a single shot being fired, as the city's authorities fled. This city could have become an important strategic point for the Egyptian general; but Ibrahim, stopping only to resupply, moved on to Homs.

Meanwhile, on Hussein Pasha's orders, Mehmed Pasha marched on Hama to fortify it. However, upon arriving there, by his own account, he was unable to fortify it, as the area near Hama was ill-suited for a fortified camp. But more likely, however, this was merely a pretext to advance on Homs, where the enemy was believed to be, hoping to reap the laurels of victory over Ibrahim Pasha without the commander-in-chief's intervention.

Finally, Mehmet gave in to his impatience and advanced toward Homs. The complete lack of preparation for the move revealed it as a gamble. To advance quickly, the pasha even deemed it unnecessary to take grain for his soldiers, relying on the fertility of the Orontes Valley. But the Aleppo Governor's militias had long since plundered all accessible villages in their rear, completely devastating the area and turning it into a desert. Exhausted and hungry, the troops reached the gates of Homs around midday on July 9.

The Turkish command didn't expect the imminent arrival of Egyptian troops. Turkish commanders assumed Ibrahim was still 18 hours away from Homs, so they took no serious action. However, as a messenger reported, and as Turkish intelligence later confirmed, Ibrahim was only two hours away from Homs. Panic gripped the Turkish camp. Bedouins acting as scouts had already clashed with enemy units, which rushed forward in disarray and then retreated to organize. After marching between 1,000 and 1,500 paces, the Egyptians saw the deployed Turkish army.

== Battle ==
Ibrahim Pasha waited a long time for an attack without success, and then advanced. On the orders of the commander-in-chief, the Egyptian army's right flank executed a flanking maneuver, go to the rear the enemy's left flank. Forming up at this distance, they attacked the irregular cavalry. They soon routed it and then advanced in regimental line from the right flank into the space between the village and the gardens of Homs, where the Turkish cavalry on the left flank deployed in line to counter the Egyptian troops.

At the same time, the Egyptian forces carried out several maneuvers. To support the movement of his cavalry, Ibrahim simultaneously deployed the guard on the right flank in front of the village of Rukken, forming a hook opposite the first line, and covered the guard's left flank with battalion columns. He positioned a battery on the guard's right flank and took a position the village with two companies of riflemen and two howitzers. At the same time, movement on the Egyptian left flank attracted the attention of the Turks. The Egyptian left flank crossed the canal at its bend, followed by the battery and cavalry, and deployed on the left bank. The regiment's riflemen scouted the banks, and the cavalry took up a position behind as reserve.

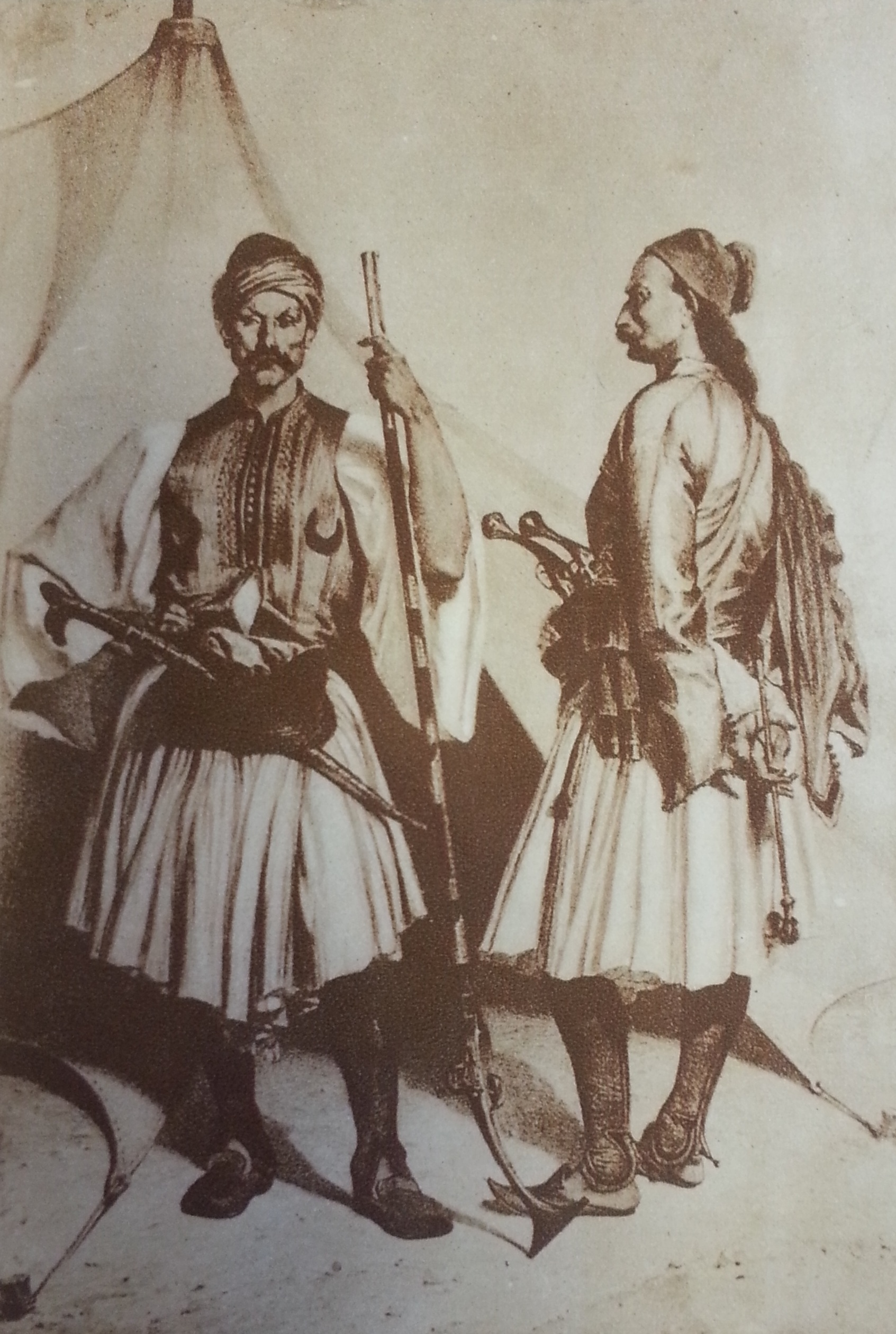
Egyptian soldiers to Ibrahim Pasha

Alarmed by this demonstration of the right flank, Mehmed Pasha ordered two battalions of Bekir Pasha's brigade, supported by two guns, to turn against him. When it was close enough, the guards, deployed in place, opened fire in two ranks, while their battery continued firing without ceasing. At the same moment, the Egyptian right flank, under the personal command of Ibrahim, launched a powerful attack against the already shaken Turkish left flank, charging the Turkish cavalry and driving them into the gardens of Homs. The Turks also returned fire, but significantly weaker due to their batteries being scattered and poorly manned, stationed alone. Mehmed Pasha's artillery, either through forgetfulness or unwillingness to engage, remained in the cemetery and did not participate in the battle. The Turkish left flank endured deadly fire for over 20 minutes. Then Ferik Megmed Pasha noticed that after about 15 minutes of firing, his artillery was out of ammunition and significantly inferior to the Egyptians. He ordered the battery positioned between the city and the army's rear to be brought forward, but Bekir Pasha tried in vain to force it forward. He even threatened the gun commander with a drawn saber, but the commander refused to budge.

Without waiting for the artillery, Ferik Megmed Pasha ordered the left flank to attack the enemy. The young commander himself stood before the battalion and led the soldiers in a bayonet charge. At the head of the central corps, he prepares for a frontal assault on the guards, while Kritli Oglu Mehmet will outflank them with cavalry. The resumption of the battle depends on the success of this attempt. At first, the attack was a great success: the enemy retreated and even abandoned eight guns. However, the Turkish infantry soon noticed that the artillery was not following them. The cavalry detachment, which was supposed to attack the enemy's right flank and rear, but due to the commander's inexperience, strayed too far from its positions and came under fire from enemy guns. Unable to withstand the fire, it halted. This frightened the infantry, which also failed to approach within 150 paces of the enemy. The Egyptian troops, on the contrary, were encouraged. Their commander took advantage of the moment when the Turkish troops began to waver, reinforced his right wing, and personally, along with the Guards Regiment, rushed to the aid of the retreating troops. The Egyptians concentrated their forces in one place and opened heavy rifle fire on the most advanced Turkish units. The Turkish soldiers, fearing heavy losses, began to break ranks. The outcome of the battle was decided. Instead of rallying the retreating troops, the commanders themselves set the example of flight, and soon the retreat became so widespread that even Mehmed Pasha abandoned the battlefield in chaos. The reserve artillery and cavalry were the first to flee, leaving the infantry at the mercy of the Egyptian cavalry. Those who remained to hold the line were first attacked by the guards and then annihilated by Ibrahim's cavalry. Finally, the Turks fled in complete disarray through Homs and around the city on both sides.

== Aftermath ==
The Egyptian victory was complete. The camp, the commandant's warehouses, the Turkish convoy with supplies and ammunition, as well as some two thousand prisoners, three thousand killed and wounded, and twenty four guns, fell into Egyptian hands. The Sublime Porte's army was completely routed, and all of Syria came under Ibrahim's control. A significant portion of the Syrian tribes, almost immediately supported the strongest, sending Ibrahim Pasha letters of congratulations and verbal assurances of support, which would have been addressed to the Mehmed Pasha had he been victorious. Even the remnants of the Ottoman army were subjected to attacks and plunder by the Anazeh Arabs.

The day before the battle, Hussein left Antioch and found himself in Djeser-Shogre that same day. There, he first received news of Mehmed Pasha's reckless and insubordinate advance, and just an hour later, news of his own defeat. Hussein was furious at the presumption of the vanguard, which had dared to advance toward Homs without waiting for his permission or presence. But instead of taking a strong position with his army and thereby dispelling the negative impression, he decided to abandon the Orontes Valley and retreat through Antioch to Aleppo, which he intended to use as a defensive base.

This unsuccessful measure was taken without even waiting for the arrival of the corps defeated near Homs, and the militias, having learned about the departure of the army on which they had placed their hopes, were seized with panic. During the pursuit, the Egyptians discovered eleven cannons, as well as ammunition and tents, abandoned to Mehmet's army. They reached the main army in this state, and the panic of the routed militias had already spread to the regular troops. The ranks broke, and the troops rushed back the way they had come, as if pursued. The Turkish army hastily fled first to Hama and then quickly advanced toward Antioch, while others advanced toward Aleppo. Only in Antioch were senior officers able to convince them of the groundlessness of their fears and restore some semblance of order. Then Ibrahim stopped the pursuit and advanced toward Aleppo.

On July 14, the Ottoman army reached Aleppo. It still numbered 22,000 men, but hunger and disease were dwindling its ranks daily, requiring a resting place before further action. However, the Aleppo city authorities refused to allow them to enter the gates and adopted a hostile stance toward Hussein's troops. Under these circumstances, with the arrival of Bedouin archers, Hussein was forced to retreat during the night to the Amanus Mountain pass, through which he hoped to reach Cilicia. On July 18, Ibrahim Pasha arrived in Aleppo, which not only immediately opened the gates to him but also provided provisions for its troops, which had been denied to the Sultan's army. The Egyptians also needed them, as fever and cholera were raging among them, and the generalissimo deemed it necessary to remain in the city until July 27.

== Notes and references ==
=== References ===
- Cadalvène, Edmond de; Barrault, Emile (1837). Histoire de la guerre de Méhémed-Ali contre la porte ottomane en Syrie et en Asie-mineure, 1831-1833 [History of the war of Muhammad Ali against the Ottoman Porte in Syria and Asia Minor, 1831-1833] (in French). A. Bertrand.
- Olberg, Eduard von (1837). Geschichte des Krieges zwischen Mehemed Ali und der ottomanischen Pforte in Syrien und Klein: Asien in den Jahren 1831 bis 1833 [History of the war between Mehemed Ali and the Ottoman Porte in Syria and Lesser Asia in the years 1831 to 1833] (in German). Berlin: Ferdinand Dümmler.
- Bodart, Gaston (1908). Militär-historisches Kriegs-Lexikon (1618–1905) (in German). Vienna and Leipzig: C. W. Stern.
- Muravyov-Karsky, Nikolay (1869). Турция и Египет в 1832 и 1833. Vol. 2. Harvard University – via Google Books.
- Paton, Andrew Archibald (1863). History of the Egyptian Revolution: From the period of the Mamelukes to the death of Mohammed Ali. BoD – Books on Demand.
- Lutsky, Vladimir (1969). "Mohammed Ali's Struggle for Syria and Palestine. Egypt's Defeat". In Daglish, Robert (ed.). Modern History of the Arab Countries. Translated by Nasser, Lika. Moscow: Progress Publishers.
- Rosen, Georg (1866). Geschichte der Türkei von dem Siege der Reform im Jahre 1826 bis zum Pariser Tractat vom [History of Turkey from the victory of reform in 1826 to the Treaty of Paris of 1856] (in German). Jahre.
