= Thévenin =

Thévenin is a surname. Notable people with the surname include:

- Charles Thévenin (1764–1838), neoclassical French painter
- Denis Thévenin, birth name of French author Georges Duhamel
- Léon Charles Thévenin (1857–1926), French engineer

- Thévenin's theorem, electrical engineering theorem developed by him

- Nicolas Thévenin (born 1958), bishop and Vatican diplomat
- Olivier Thévenin (born 1968), French racing driver
