= Convention of Kütahya =

1833 peace agreement ending the Egyptian–Ottoman War

The Convention of Kütahya, also known as the Peace Agreement of Kütahya, ended the Egyptian–Ottoman War (1831–1833) in May 1833.

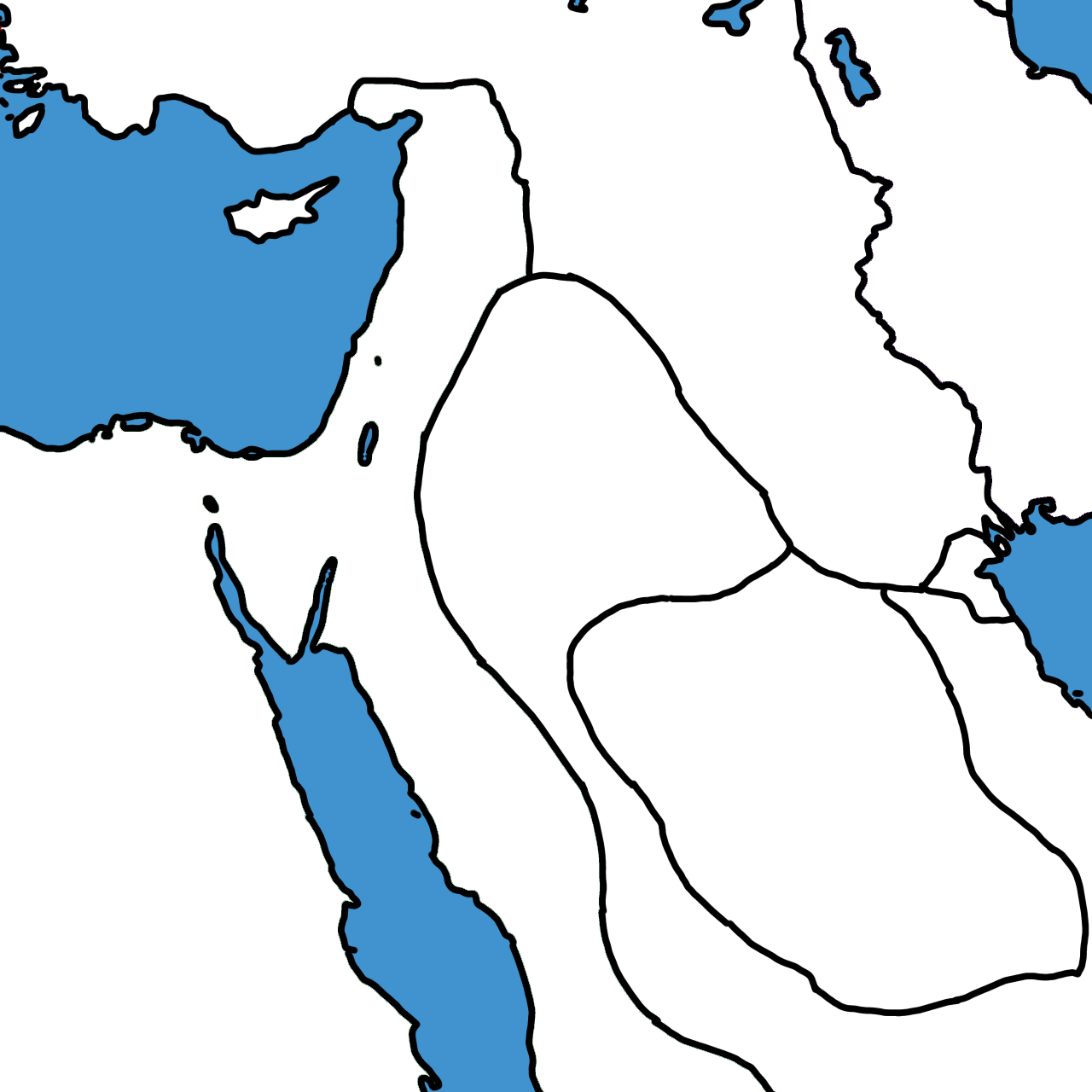
The Middle East after the Treaty of Kütahya

== Information ==
At the convention, the Ottoman provinces of Syria and Adana were ceded to Egypt, and Ibrahim Pasha of Egypt became governor-general of the two provinces. But the settlement of the Peace Agreement was not satisfactory to either party, resulting in the Second Ottoman-Egyptian War in 1839–1841.

== Overview ==
Muhammad Ali of Egypt, ostensibly only a vassal state of the Ottoman Empire, was seeking to increase his personal power and gain control over Palestine, Syria and Arabia. In late 1831, he took his newly reformed army into a war against the Ottoman Sultan, Mahmud II, and easily defeated Ottoman forces and threatened Constantinople itself. While Britain and France were sympathetic to Muhammad Ali, Nicholas I sent a Russian army to the assistance of the Turks. This intervention brought about peace by May 1833, which left Muhammad Ali of Egypt in control of Syria and Arabia.

== Text of the Firman ==
The firman (issued by the Sultan on the 6 May 1833) was addressed to all the authorities of the empire:

" The assurances of fidelity and of devotion, lastly given to me by the Governor of Egypt, Mahomet Ali Pacha, and his son Ibrahim, having been accepted, I have granted them my imperial benignity. The governments of Candia and Egypt are continued to Mahomet Ali. And in reference to his special claim, I have granted him the provinces of Damascus, Tripoli-in-Syria, Sidon, Saphet, Aleppo, the districts of Jerusalem and Nablous, with the conduct of pilgrims and the commandment of the Tcherde (the yearly offering to the tomb of the Prophet). His son, Ibrahim Pacha, has again the title of Sheikh and Harem of Mekka, and the district of Jedda; and farther, I have acquiesced in his request to have the district of Adana ruled by the Treasury of Taurus, with the title of Mohassil."

The text goes on to offer amnesty to all persons for the events in Asia Minor, and charges the authorities to tranquilize the inhabitants, and to obtain their prayers for the Sultan.
