= Egyptian–Ottoman War (1831–1833) =

Military conflict between the Ottoman Empire and the Eyalet of Egypt (1831–33)

First Egyptian–Ottoman War
- Part of the campaigns of Muhammad Ali of Egypt
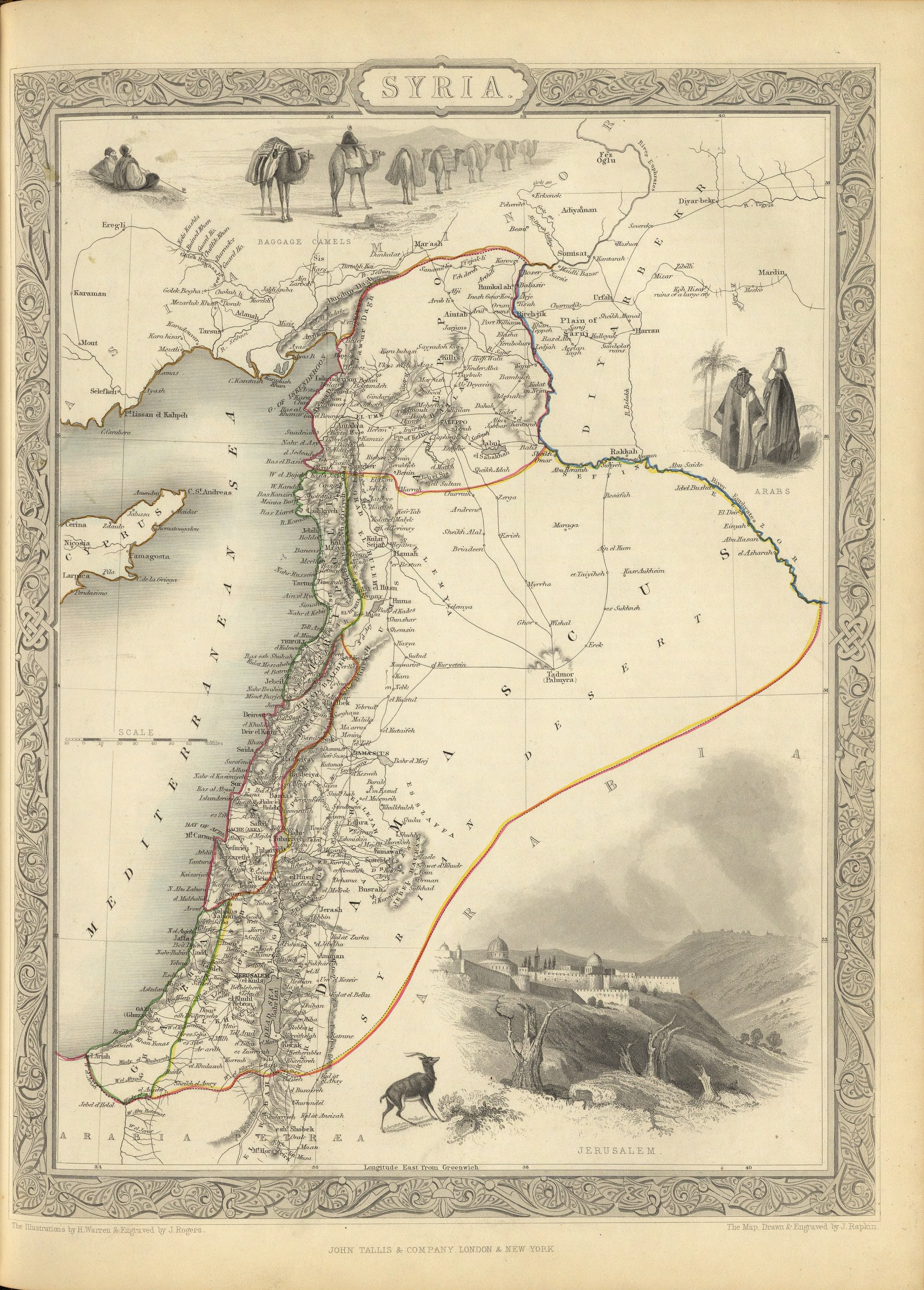
- Map of Syria, 1851.
Date	10 October 1831 – 8 April 1833
Location	Syria, Ottoman Empire
Result	Egyptian victory: Convention of Kütahya; Egypt becomes an autonomous vassal of the Ottoman Empire and a de facto independent state; Unresolved tensions result in a second war six years later
Territorial changes	Ottoman cession of Syria and Adana to Egypt

Belligerents
(Ottoman Egypt) Egypt; Mount Lebanon Emirate	Ottoman Empire

Commanders and leaders
(Ottoman Egypt) Muhammad Ali (Ottoman Egypt) Ibrahim Pasha (Ottoman Egypt) Soliman Pasha al-Faransawi; Bashir Shihab II	(Ottoman Empire) Mahmud II (Ottoman Empire) Reşid Mehmed Pasha (POW) (Ottoman Empire) Ağa Hüseyin Paşa (Ottoman Empire) Mehmed Pasha (Ottoman Empire) Abdullah Pasha ibn Ali (POW)

Strength
(Ottoman Egypt) At least 50,000 (Note: In Greater Syria.)	60,000–100,000

Casualties and losses
(Ottoman Egypt) 3,392–3,792	(Ottoman Empire) 19,500–21,000

The First Egyptian–Ottoman War or First Syrian War (1831–1833) was a military conflict between the Ottoman Empire and Egypt brought about by Muhammad Ali Pasha's demand to the Sublime Porte for control of Greater Syria, as reward for aiding the Sultan during the Greek War of Independence. As a result, Egyptian forces temporarily gained control of Syria, advancing as far north as Kütahya.

== Background ==
Muhammad Ali Pasha of Egypt is recorded as planning to extend his rule to the Ottoman Empire's Syrian provinces as early as 1812, secretly telling the British consul of his designs on the territory that year. This desire was left on hold, however, as he consolidated his rule over Egypt, modernizing its government administration, public services, and armed forces, and suppressing various rebellions, including Mamluk and Wahhabi uprisings—on behalf of Sultan Mahmud II.

In 1825, the Sultan again called on Muhammad Ali to suppress a local uprising, this time a nationalist revolution by Greek Christians. He was promised rule over Crete and the Morea (the modern Peloponnese) for his services. His son, Ibrahim Pasha, won quick victories at the head of a conscript army and controlled nearly the entire Peloponnesian peninsula within 10 months of his arrival in February 1825. The Greeks continued guerrilla operations however, and by September 1827 public opinion in Russia, Britain, and France forced the great powers to intervene in favour of the Greeks. The joint British–Russian–French fleet destroyed Muhammad Ali's fleet that October at the Battle of Navarino, and Ibrahim’s forces were expelled from the Morea a year later following the arrival of a French expeditionary force and a settlement negotiated by the European powers. Once Ibrahim and his forces returned from Greece, preparations to wrest control of Syria began in earnest.

There was a two-year delay because of the Franco-Egyptian plans for the conquest of North Africa. According to the plan of the French ambassador to Egypt, Bernardino Drovetti, the conquest of Algiers (as well as Tripoli and Tunis) was to be carried out not by King Charles X, but by the French-backed armies of Mehmed Ali. This would help improve relations with Egypt, which had been damaged after the Battle of Navarino, increase France's prestige, and avoid British intervention. Muhammad Ali quickly accepted this, forming a 40,000-man army under Ibrahim for a campaign against Africa, but demanded, in addition to funds, that France provide him with four 80-gun ships. The French refused and offered the assistance of their navy instead. This offer was extremely unpleasant for Muhammad Ali, who wanted to fight in the Maghreb under the flag of Islam. In 1830, France put forward a new plan for a joint campaign. The Egyptians were supposed to capture Tripoli and Tunis, and France, Algeria. But Muhammad Ali rejected this plan as well. Ultimately, he completely refused to participate in the Algerian campaign, which the French undertook independently, while Muhammad Ali devoted himself entirely to events in Syria.

The Porte was unprepared for war with Egypt. It had been seriously weakened by the Greek uprising and the war against Russia. Military reforms, following the dissolution of the Janissary corps, were still far from complete in 1831. Furthermore, the main Ottoman forces were in the Balkans at the time, suppressing Bosniak and Albanian uprisings.

== The conquest of Syria ==
In October 1831, Ibrahim Pasha launched a campaign. The troops with which Ibrahim Pasha, appointed commander-in-chief, undertook the conquest of Syria numbered only thirty to forty thousand men. He also commanded an impressive fleet, consisting of sixteen warships and seventeen transport vessels, carrying his staff officers, as well as forty small cannons and several siege guns. Their campaign was delayed until late autumn due to a cholera outbreak, which claimed the lives of over 5,000 soldiers in just over a month.

Ibrahim Pasha's Army near Jaffa

Finally, on November 2, 1831, the decisive hour arrived, and two expeditions were ordered to march to Syria, one by land, the other by sea. The army set out overland from Shalkhiya in northern Cairo, through al-Arish, and finally to Jaffa. In Jaffa, they were met by Ibrahim Pasha, who arrived by sea on November 9 and entered the city three days later. After capturing Jaffa, Ibrahim easily entered Haifa on November 17, 1831. Immediately thereafter, Sidon, Tyre, Beirut, Tripoli, Latakia, Jerusalem, and Nablus swore allegiance to Mehmed Ali's son, allowing him to focus his efforts on capturing the strategically important city of Acre. By the end of November, the Egyptian army arrived at Acre.

Soon, at the far end of the harbor where Acre now stands,Ibrahim, emulating General Bonaparte, established his headquarters at Haifa, at the foot of Mount Carmel; there he concentrated his ammunition, reserves, and ships. Five ships of the line, several frigates, and countless light vessels were to surround the city, blockade it, and bombard it; thirty thousand men were to besiege it from this narrow strip of land, so difficult to approach. On November 26, the siege began. Abdullah was only slightly alarmed.

=== Siege of Acre ===
At the beginning of the siege, Ibrahim experienced incredible luck. As Charles Napier noted, if a storm had arisen, not a single ship would have been able to return to Alexandria. In accordance with the Egyptian plans Acre was besieged by sea and land. On December 9 an attempt was made to overwhelm the place with a com-bined bombardment from the shipping and the land batteries. But the ships suffered considerable damage and the land batteries made small impression.

On March 7, a second assault on the fortress began. The Egyptians launched several attacks but were repelled with heavy losses. Abdullah Pasha even personally participated in the battle with his best troops. Abdullah may not have been particularly honest or wise, but he was a brave and decisive man, and the siege in its early stages was conducted with great skill. A party of the stormers penetrated to the market place, but finding themselves unsupported had to withdraw. Ultimately, the Egyptian forces retreated, suffering 1,200 casualties. The ships that participated in the battle, seriously damaged, sailed to Alexandria for repair. Ibrahim's position began to appear critical.

At the end of March, Osman Pasha's army, several thousand strong, arrived in Tripoli. However, during his first attempt to take it, he was defeated and forced to retreat. A battalion was sent after him to pursue Osman Pasha. In the ensuing clash, both armies were forced to retreat to their camps.

Ibrahim Pasha, concerned about the situation in Tripoli, delegated command to one of his generals and set out for Tripoli with an army of 8,000 and six cannons. Almost as soon as Ibrahim appeared before the Turks, Osman Pasha fled, joining forces with the Pasha of Aleppo. After arriving in Tripoli, he advanced on Homs. However, facing unexpected resistance from Serasker Mehmed Pasha, he was forced to retreat to Khan-Kassir. There, he encountered the combined forces of three pashas and engaged in battle. After several hours of fighting, Ibrahim was forced to withdraw from the battlefield, suffering heavy losses.

Abdullah Pasha, learning that Ibrahim Pasha's main forces were in the Lebanese mountains at the time, decided to make a sortie. Having lured the Egyptian army under the fortress, the remaining troops in Acre emerged and opened fire on the Egyptians. The besiegers were soon surrounded and routed, in the meantime, Abdallah successfully captured some of the Egyptian artillery. The Egyptian troops retreated, giving Abdullah time to restore the fortress's fortifications.

Following these events, Ibrahim Pasha returned to the siege of Acre, and on May 19, he began a massive shelling on the fortress. By that time, Acre was practically destroyed.

At dawn on May 27 Ibrahim directed the storming party in person. A long struggle ensued. Ibrahim is related to have cut down with his own hand several officers who had fallen into the rear of the storming columns, and after great efforts he had by nightfall succeeded in capturing the place, which was then, in strict accordance with western rules of war, given up to plunder. Abdullah proudly declared: “When Ibrahim took it the walls had been destroyed; of my 6000 men 5600 were dead, and of my treasure nothing remained but a few jewels”. After the siege, of Abdullah Pasha who was sent as a prisoner of war to Egypt. Egyptian losses are estimated at 2,000, although there are reports of losses as high as 4,500.

=== Syria ===
The Porte was hesitant in its approach to the Egyptian questions. It dispatched Nazif Efendi to Alexandria to simultaneously ascertain Mehmed Ali's position, ordering him to withdraw his troops from Syria, and ordered Abdullah not to interfere in Egyptian affairs, condemning both sides. However, these measures failed. It then took more active action. It began mobilizing armies in Anatolia and Syria, naming Mehmed Pasha of Aleppo as commander of the Syrian army, and Ağa Hüseyin Pasha as commander-in-chief of the army, totaling approximately 60,000 men. Hussein was also appointed governor of Egypt, and Mehmed Ali himself was declared a rebel.

After the fall of Acre, Ibrahim moved toward Damascus. Ibrahim wrote to Ali Pasha, the governor of Damascus, demanding the surrender of the city, supporting this proposal by sending a siege force of 18,000 men, consisting of 9,000 regular troops and the same number of Bedouins, and 24 cannons. Upon receiving Ibrahim's letter, Ali Pasha convened a council of Damascus's nobles, at which it was decided not to evacuate the city until at least some resistance was offered. However, the city's inhabitants were unable to withstand a siege, let alone provide the soldiers necessary to defend the city. On the evening of June 14, the Egyptian army set up camp near the village of Avadich, two hours' drive south of Damascus.

On the morning of June 15, at 3:00 PM, 800 cavalrymen appeared west of Avadich, and infantry to the east. After the former were driven back by an Egyptian squadron and Bedouins, and the latter by a volley from an infantry battalion, Ali Pasha considered this display of honor to have satisfied his defense and conscience. He retreated, accompanied by all Turkish authorities and guarded by 1,500 cavalry and 500 infantry, uncontested in Homs. After Ali Pasha's departure, the inhabitants opened the gates of Damascus to the Egyptians, surrendering the city.

The then-ongoing Tanzimat reforms of Mahmud II had experienced significant difficulties in adopting the innovative military methods of conscription and mass drill then being implemented in European armies, but Muhammad Ali had managed to adopt both. Ibrahim's overwhelming success cannot be attributed only to modern organization however. His officers had significantly more experience than their Ottoman counterparts, having borne the brunt of fighting in the Empire's two most recent major wars against the Wahhabi and Greek rebellions, and he attracted significant local support to his cause by calling his campaign one for "liberation from the Turkish yoke."

Meanwhile some naval action took place. The Ottoman fleet was commanded by Halil Rifat Pasha, commanding a fleet of 35 ships. The Egyptians, however, were commanded by Osman Nurreden, who commanded a fleet of 29 ships. Thus, the Ottoman fleet was superior in material terms to the Egyptian fleet, and even according some estimates estimates Turkish and Russian military, it enjoyed complete naval superiority over the Egyptians. If the fleet had sailed to Egypt, it could have caused a dangerous diversion, given the uneasy mood of the local population. But the young admiral, Halil Pasha, appointed on Hüsrev's advice, was completely unfamiliar with naval affairs and, understandably, incapable of developing and executing a plan of action. As if the admirals of the two powers had agreed to observe such a truce, the two fleets, meeting after the Battle of Beilan near Cyprus, took turns pursuing each other without exchanging a single shot. Their military actions ended with the Turkish squadron entering the harbor of Marmaris on the coast of Karaman; the Egyptian squadron blockaded it there. But the brief blockade allowed the Turkish squadron to leave Marmaris harbor, and the Egyptian admiral merely pursued it to the Dardanelles. Thus, defeats on land were not compensated for by victories at sea.

Meanwhile, Ibrahim advanced north, and on July 31, 1832, his army crossed the Taurus Mountains and captured the cities of Tarsus and Adana. After the arrival of new equipment and supplies, the cities of Urfa and Marash were captured to control the routes to Erzurum and to monitor possible army movements in the Taurus Mountains. Most communications with Egypt were by sea, where by capturing these cities, the Egyptian navy gained comfortable control over the waters of the eastern Mediterranean. With that for a while action was suspended.

== Anatolian campaign ==
The defeat of Hussein Pasha's forces raised various concerns in Constantinople regarding the outcome of the war. Sultan Mahmud II was extremely disappointed when, in the second half of August, news of the complete failure of military operations, the army's ignominious retreat to Karamania, and the Egyptian advance to the Taurus Mountains became known. Ağa Hüseyin Pasha could consider himself fortunate that, even after his defeat, Mahmud overcame his resentment and not only refrained from punishing him but even offered him the prospect of becoming viceroy of Egypt — a gift of mercy.

=== Peace Negotiations ===
Meanwhile discussions had been continuously pro-ceeding between Alexandria and Constantinople. The Sultan had sent commissioners at the end of 1831, who had been received with much graciousness; but the discussions were prolonged over the next two months and ended in nothing more lasting than the fumes of the chibouques they puffed day after day in the viceroy's palace. Then followed an indirect negotiation conducted through the Turkish Kapudan Pasha. During the negotiations, Ibrahim Pasha voiced his list of demands at his headquarters:

- Independence – as the most important issue, surpassing all others.
- Anatolia and Cilicia – for the timber needed for the Egyptian fleet.
- Cyprus – as a base for a new Egyptian fleet.
- Baghdad, in his opinion, was of little importance; it was too far away and too poor.

In September Muhammad Ali told Barker that as he had had no satisfactory answer, there was nothing left for him but to march on Constantinople and that he had secret news from that place that "there is now nothing to prevent my doing so." But in November he was still ready to negotiate with any agent whom the Porte chose to send to Alexandria, and directing Ibrahim not to proclaim the abolition of the Sultan's authority in Syria unless he could first obtain fatwas from the local religious leaders declaring Mahmud deposed as unfit to rule.

But under cover of these palavers, the Sultan was preparing a final effort to drive the rebel's forces out of Syria. Indeed his negotiations were apparently de-signed to throw the enemy off his guard and divert him from either advancing on Constantinople or increasing his forces until the Turkish preparations had been completed.

The final diplomatic mission was the arrival of a Russian officer, Lieutenant General Muravyov, in Constantinople with orders to proceed immediately to Alexandria and demand that the viceroy cease attacks on Turkey. He arrived in Alexandria on January 13. Early the next morning, he had a brief audience. He presented no written documents to the viceroy, and it was announced that he had arrived as a mediator in the peace process. However, it was generally believed that his mission was to urge Muhammad Ali to retreat from Karamania and Syria, hand over his fleet to the sultan, and reduce his army to 20,000 men. Two days later, and again on the 18th, he had two more lengthy and secret conversations with the pasha.Muhammad Ali relented, promising to submit to the sultan and, as a pledge of goodwill, to cease hostilities.

=== Resumption of action ===
Due to his failures, Seraskir Ağa Hüseyin Pasha was removed from his post, and Reşid Mehmed Pasha was appointed in his place with the task of forming a new army. The army, assembled from Anatolia and Rumelia under the command of Seraskir Reşid Mehmed Pasha, united with the Ottoman units retreating to Karahisar. The combined strength of the newly assembled and retreating armies reached 65,000 men. A significant portion of this number consisted of Albanian and Bosnian soldiers recruited in Rumelia.

Reşid Mehmed Pasha intended to establish a base in Akşehir where the army could rest until spring and then, using light cavalry units, encircle Konya and its surroundings to cut the Egyptian army's supply lines. This way, the army, exhausted after reaching Akşehir, would rest and prepare for battle through combat exercises. On the other hand, the Egyptian army's morale was weakened by fear of a surprise attack. Otherwise, engaging an exhausted army in battle would only give the Egyptian side an advantage. But the Ottoman Sultan Mahmud II strongly opposed the idea of leaving the army in Akşehir. He wanted an immediate response to the severe defeats the Ottoman army had suffered at Homs and Belen. Therefore, he ordered the immediate mobilization of the army and an attack on the Egyptian army.

In December, Reşid Mehmed Pasha, following orders from the Sultan, marched with his army from Akşehir to Konya. However, during the journey, severe frosts and colds began, which was ignored by Reşid. He did not take into account the difficulties and disadvantages that the army would face by leading them along a road completely covered with snow. Turkish soldiers had to throw away some of the food and ammunition due to the impossibility of transporting them. Ultimately, the army was demoralized from cold and hunger.

The Egyptian army left Ereğli on November 13, 1832, and entered Konya on November 18, 1832. The Egyptian army captured Konya without any resistance. The residents of Konya also did not respond to the actions of the Egyptian troops. The Egyptian army felt the need to take some precautions in Konya. Since the walls surrounding Konya were low, making the city difficult to defend, the defense of the city was abandoned. Therefore, it was decided to look for a battlefield outside the city. The Egyptian army decided that the battlefield would be the area around Aslım Marsh, located north and east of Konya, outside the city itself.

On 18 and 19 December, several minor skirmishes occurred between the advance units and reconnaissance troops of the two armies; On December 18, the imperial vanguard, commanded by Rauf Pasha, advanced, not without hesitation, to meet those formidable Egyptians against whom it knew in advance it could not hold out. Ibrahim, who recognized the irregulars, probed them gently and was content to capture a few cannons that were only lightly contested; on the 19 december, small partial successes brought him more artillery, ammunition, and prisoners. Rauf, in the absence of his leader, did not dare compromise his troops with all-out resistance; finally, on the 20th, news arrived that the Grand Vizier was approaching; this time, the fate of Turkey would be decided.

==== Battle of Konya ====
On 21 December 1832, at about noon the advancing Ottomans' artillery opened fire when the front lines were about 600 yards (550 m) apart. With the heavy fog, the range was spotty, and the Egyptian artillery held their fire until they could guess the Ottomans' positions from the sound of their cannonade, and so could find their range more precisely. As the artillery exchange thundered on, Ibrahim advanced with his scouts to a well east of the road to survey the Ottoman positions. During a momentary lifting of the fog, he noticed a gap in the Ottoman formation between their cavalry and infantry on their left flank, to the East. He rapidly called his reserves (the Guards Brigade and the two cavalry Brigades) and personally led them into this gap between the road and the marshes, causing confusion in the Ottoman left flank by this sudden onslaught, as some of their cavalry was trapped and scattered in the foggy marshes. As the Ottoman left flank collapsed, the grand vizier Reshid Pasha personally moved to their midst to rally them, but in the foggy confusion found himself surrounded by Egyptians and captured. The capture of their supreme commander deepened the confusion amongst the Ottomans, and some units lost cohesion and broke ranks as the Egyptian artillery and cavalry advanced around their left flank to their rear, enveloping the now disorganised units and continuing a relentless slaughter from three directions, South, East and North. As night fell, the new Ottoman commander managed to rally some units and organised a desperate counter-attack from the West against the Egyptian left flank, but this failed as the Egyptian centre wheeled to face them with an organised barrage of artillery and as this attack broke, the remaining Ottomans scattered. The Egyptians suffered only 792 casualties, compared to the Ottoman army's 3,000 dead, and they captured 46 of the 100 guns with which the army had left Constantinople. The stunning victory at Konya would be the final and most impressive victory of the Egyptian campaign against the Sublime Porte, and would represent the high point of Muhammad Ali's power in the region.

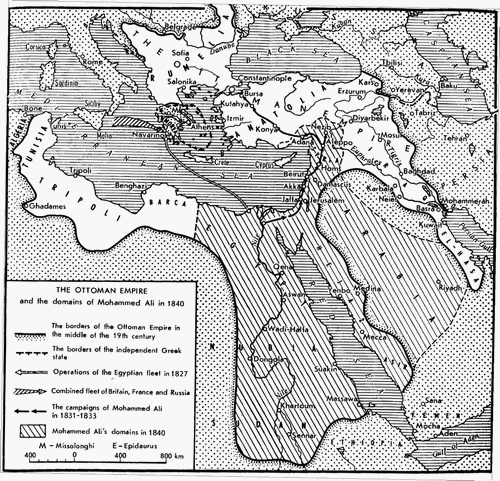
Territory controlled by Muhammad Ali of Egypt following the peace settlement with Mahmud II in 1833.

With no military forces between the Egyptian army and Constantinople, the Ottomans suffered a humiliating defeat by the hands of the Egyptians. Egypt had conquered almost all of Turkey besides the city of Constantinople where severe winter weather forced him to make camp at Konya long enough for the Sublime Porte to conclude an alliance with Russia, and for Russian forces to arrive in Anatolia, blocking his route to the capital. The arrival of the Russian power would prove to be too great a challenge for Ibrahim's army to overcome. Wary of Russia’s expanding influence in the Ottoman Empire and its potential to upset the balance of power, French and British pressure forced Muhammad Ali and Ibrahim to agree to the Convention of Kütahya.

== Aftermath ==
Under the settlement, the Syrian provinces and Adana were ceded to Egypt, and Ibrahim Pasha was made the governor-general of the region.

The treaty left Muhammad Ali a nominal vassal of the Sultan. Six years later, when Muhammad Ali moved to declare de jure independence, the Sultan declared him a traitor and sent an army to confront Ibrahim Pasha, launching the Second Egyptian–Ottoman War.

== See also ==
- Military of ancient Egypt
- Egyptian Armed Forces
- Egyptian Army
- List of wars involving Egypt
- Treaty of Hünkâr İskelesi

== Bibliography ==
- Aksan, Virginia (2007). Ottoman Wars 1700-1870: An Empire Besieged. Routledge Taylor & Francis Group – via Google Books.
- Cadalvène, Edmond de; Barrault, Emile (1837). Histoire de la guerre de Méhémed-Ali contre la porte ottomane en Syrie et en Asie-mineure, 1831-1833 [History of the war of Muhammad Ali against the Ottoman Porte in Syria and Asia Minor, 1831-1833] (in French). A. Bertrand.
- Dodwell, Henry (1931). The founder of modern Egypt. Cambridge at the university press – via Archive Internet.
- Fahmy, Khaled (2002). All the Pasha's men: Mehmed Ali, his army and the making of modern Egypt. The American University in Cairo Press. ISBN 9789774246968.
- Kiş, Salih (2010). Kavalalı Mehmet Ali Paşa'nın Anadolu Harekâtı ve Konya Muharebesi [Mehmet Ali Pasha's Anatolian Campaign and the Battle of Konya] (in Turkish). Edebiyat Fakültesi Dergisi.
- Lutsky, Vladimir (1969). "Mohammed Ali's Struggle for Syria and Palestine. Egypt's Defeat". In Daglish, Robert (ed.). Modern History of the Arab Countries. Translated by Nasser, Lika. Moscow: Progress Publishers.
- Muravyov-Karsky, Nikolay (1869). Турция и Египет в 1832 и 1833. Vol. 1–2. Harvard University – via Google Books.
- Napier, Charles (1842). The war in Syria. John Parker – via Google Books.
- Olberg, Eduard von (1837). Geschichte des Krieges zwischen Mehemed Ali und der ottomanischen Pforte in Syrien und Klein: Asien in den Jahren 1831 bis 1833 [History of the war between Mehemed Ali and the Ottoman Porte in Syria and Lesser Asia in the years 1831 to 1833] (in German). Berlin: Ferdinand Dümmler.
- Ozavci, Ozan (2021). Dangerous Gifts: Imperialism, Security, and Civil Wars in the Levant, 1798-1864. Oxford University Press.
- Paton, Andrew Archibald (1863). History of the Egyptian Revolution: From the period of the Mamelukes to the death of Mohammed Ali. BoD – Books on Demand.
- Prokesch, Anton (1877). Mehmed-Ali, Vize-König von Aegypten: aus meinem Tagebuche 1826-1841 [Mehmed-Ali, Viceroy of Egypt: from my diary 1826-1841] (in German). W. Braumüller.
- Rosen, Georg (1866). Geschichte der Türkei von dem Siege der Reform im Jahre 1826 bis zum Pariser Tractat vom [History of Turkey from the victory of reform in 1826 to the Treaty of Paris of 1856] (in German). Jahre.
- Vingtrinier, Aimé (1886). Soliman-Pacha, colonel Sève, généralissime des armées égyptiennes; ou, Histoire des guerres de l'ypte de 1820 à 1860. Avec un portrait [Soliman Pasha, Colonel Sève, Commander-in-Chief of the Egyptian Armies; or, History of the Wars of Egypt from 1820 to 1860. With a portrait] (in French). Paris: F. Didot.
