= Egyptian–Ottoman War (1839–1841) =

1839–1841 war between the Ottoman Empire and the Eyalet of Egypt

Second Egyptian–Ottoman War
- Part of the campaigns of Muhammad Ali of Egypt
- Map of Syria, 1848.
Date	1839–1841
Location	Levant (mainly Lebanon)
Result	Ottoman victory
Territorial changes	Egyptian retrocession of Syria, Crete, and the Hejaz to the Ottoman Empire

Belligerents
(Ottoman Empire) Ottoman Empire; Supported by: (United Kingdom of Great Britain and Ireland) United Kingdom (Austrian Empire) Austria (Russian Empire) Russia (Kingdom of Prussia) Prussia	(Ottoman Egypt) Egypt; Mount Lebanon Emirate; Supported by: France

Commanders and leaders
(Ottoman Empire) Mahmud II # (Ottoman Empire) Abdülmecid I (United Kingdom of Great Britain and Ireland) Robert Stopford (United Kingdom of Great Britain and Ireland) Charles Napier (United Kingdom of Great Britain and Ireland) Charles Smith (Austrian Empire) Archduke Friedrich (Kingdom of Prussia) Helmuth von Moltke the Elder	(Ottoman Egypt) Muhammad Ali (Ottoman Egypt) Ibrahim Pasha (Ottoman Egypt) Mahmud Bey (POW); Bashir Shihab II (POW)

Casualties and losses
Nizip: ~4,000 killed, 2,000 wounded (Ottoman army under Hafiz Pasha); Sidon: 4 killed, ~30 wounded Qarnat Shawan: 40–50 killed Total: 6,044–6,080 killed or wounded	Nizip: 350 dead, 750–800 wounded Beirut: ~1,000 killed and wounded Sidon: ~3,000 garrison killed or captured Qarnat Shawan: fewer killed than coalition; 600–700 captured Acre: 1,600–2,000 killed in the magazine explosion; Mahmud Bey and several hundred of his men captured Total: 6,600–7,530 killed, wounded or captured

The Second Egyptian–Ottoman War lasted from 1839 until 1841 and was fought mainly in Syria. It has sometimes been referred to as the Syrian War or Second Syrian War.

In 1839, the Ottoman Empire moved to reoccupy lands lost to Muhammad Ali in the First Turko-Egyptian War. This resulted in the Battle of Nezib, which led to an Ottoman defeat. On 1 July, the Ottoman fleet sailed to Alexandria and surrendered to Muhammad Ali. Britain, Austria and other European nations, rushed to intervene and force Egypt into accepting a peace treaty. From September to November 1840, a combined naval fleet, made up of British and Austrian vessels, cut off Ibrahim's sea communications with Egypt, followed by the occupation of Beirut and Acre by the British. On 27 November 1840, the Convention of Alexandria took place. British Admiral Charles Napier reached an agreement with the Egyptian government, where the latter abandoned its claims to Syria and returned the Ottoman fleet in exchange of the recognition of Muhammad Ali and his sons as the only legitimate rulers of Egypt.

== Origins ==
The war was the climax of the long power-struggle between the Ottoman Empire and the Pasha of Egypt, Muhammad Ali, which had reached a point of crisis that threatened to destabilize the whole of the Levant.

On June 24, 1839, an invading Ottoman army (accompanied by Moltke the Elder) was destroyed in Syria by Muhammad Ali's general Ibrahim Pasha at the Battle of Nezib, putting him in possession of the whole of Syria. This threatened to place Constantinople itself and the rule of the entire Eastern Mediterranean within his grasp. A few days after the battle the Ottoman Sultan, Mahmud II, died, leaving his Empire in the hands of his 16-year-old heir Abdülmecid. Meanwhile, the Ottoman fleet had defected to Muhammad Ali. Britain, Russia and Austria were all pledged to support the tottering Ottoman Empire and to force Muhammad Ali (who had the support of France and Spain) to withdraw from Syria.

Although the new Sultan's ministers moved to resolve the crisis by offering to cede the rule of Syria to Muhammad Ali, the British, Austrian and Russian ambassadors forced them to rescind this offer and stand firm against him. There was even a possibility of war with France, who looked to Muhammad Ali's success to increase its sphere of influence in the Near East.

The English Historical Review No. 69 from January, 1903, has a letter Palmerston wrote to defend not notifying France about the date of the intervention.

== War ==
=== Naval intervention in Syria ===
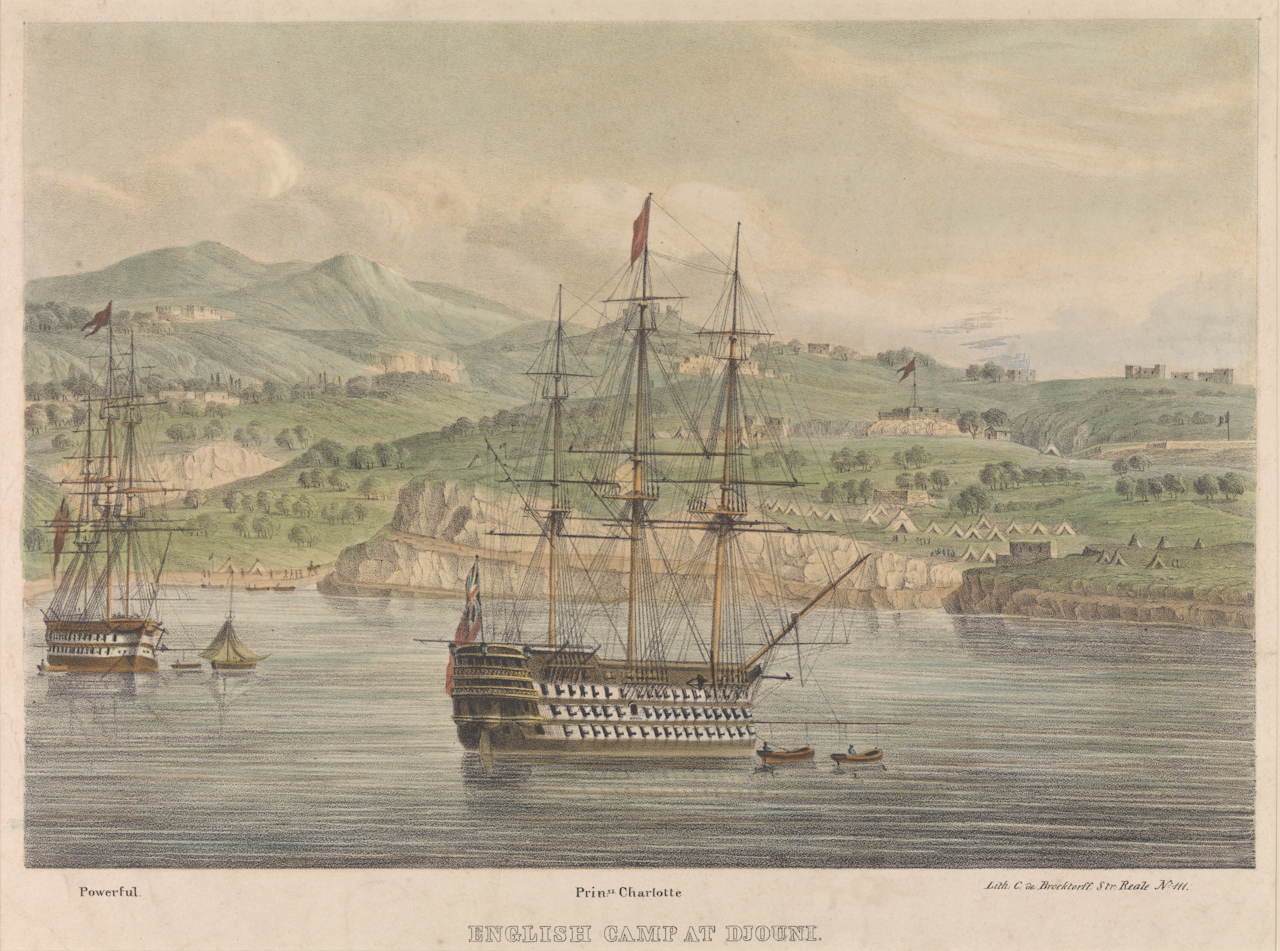
HMS Powerful and Princess Charlotte at the English Camp at Djouni, near Sidon in 1840. During the Syrian operations, the Princess Charlotte was the flagship of Admiral, Sir Robert Stopford

In June 1840, Admiral Sir Robert Stopford, commanding the British Mediterranean Fleet, sent Commodore Charles Napier with a small squadron to the Syrian (now the Lebanese) coast. He was then ordered to proceed to Beirut to compel the Egyptians to withdraw. The situation on the ground was extremely volatile, and called for quick and decisive action; this Napier provided, acting as if his was an entirely independent command.

On August 11, 1840, Napier's ships appeared off Beirut and he called upon Suleiman Pasha, Muhammad Ali's governor, to abandon the town and leave Syria, whose population shortly revolted against Muhammad Ali's occupying army. With such a small force, there was little that Napier could do against 15,000 Egyptian troops until September, when Stopford's ships joined up with him. Open war broke out on September 11, when Napier bombarded Beirut and effected a landing at Jounieh with 1,500 Turks and Marines to operate against Ibrahim, who was prevented by the revolt from doing more than trying to hold the coastal cities.

=== Sidon, Nahr-el-Kelb and Boharsef ===
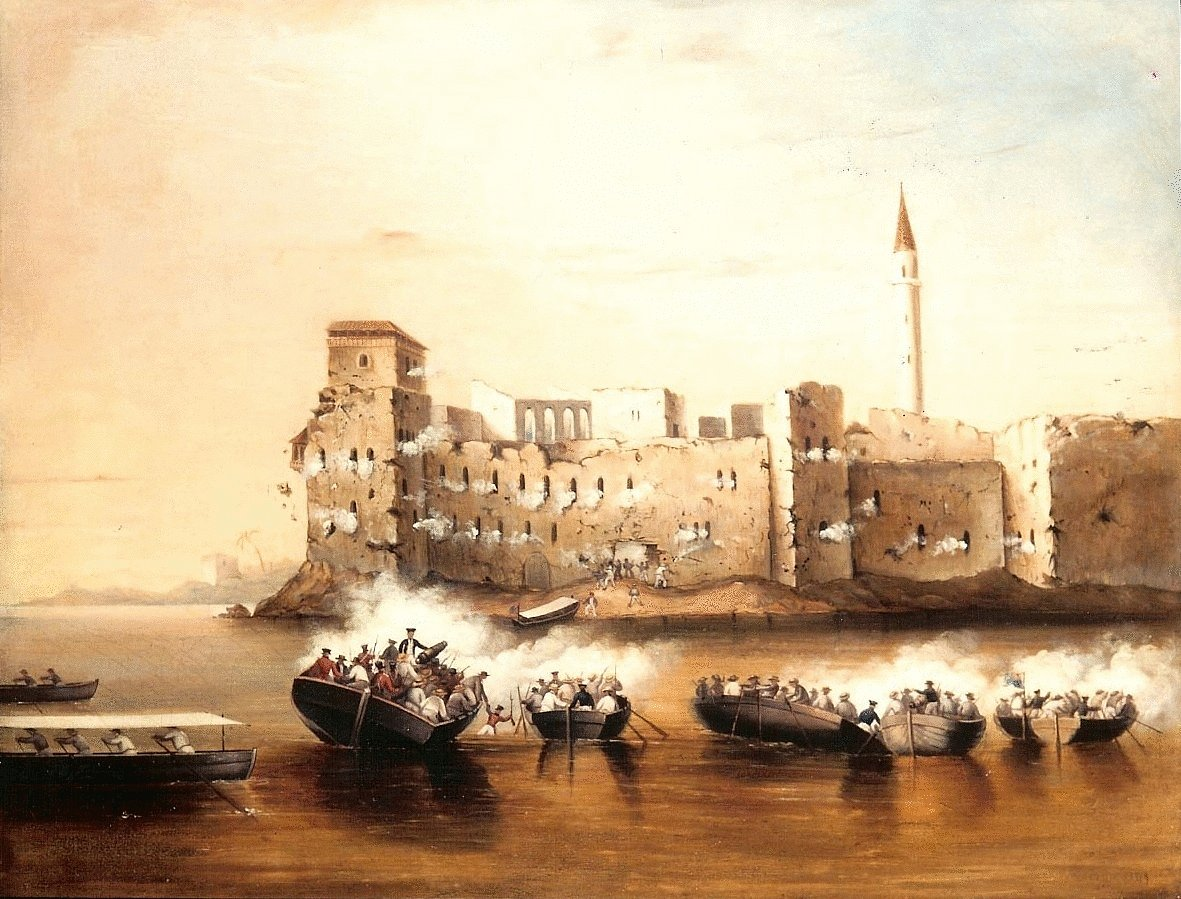
Tortosa, 23rd September 1840, attack by the boats of HMS Benbow, Carysfort and Zebra, under Captain J.F. Ross, R.N.

Due to the illness of the Brigadier-General of the army, Sir Charles Smith, Napier was instructed to command the land force and made a successful sortie against a force of Albanians at Nahr-el-Kelb (Kelbson). He then, with a mixed squadron of British, Turkish and Austrian ships, bombarded Sidon on September 26 and landed with the storming column. Sidon capitulated in two days. While preparing to attack the Egyptian positions on the heights of Boharsef, Napier received an order to retire from the command of the land forces to make way for Brigadier-General Smith, who had recovered from his illness, and also had received command of the Turkish force in the allied army. To do this, Napier would need to retreat from his position; he decided to disobey the order and continued with the attack against Ibrahim's army. The fighting, on October 9 was furious but victory was secured. Napier then left the land forces to Smith. Meanwhile, the Egyptians had abandoned Beirut on October 3.

=== Bombardment of Acre ===
The fleet was then instructed to retake Acre, which was the only coastal position left in Egyptian hands. The Mediterranean Fleet, commanded by Stopford, and supported by small Austrian and Turkish squadrons, moved into position against the western and southern sides of Acre on November 3–4 and opened fire at 14:00. The ships anchored closer to the shore than expected, at 450–800 metres, and the Egyptian guns were aimed too high. The fire of the ships was devastatingly accurate thanks to the training associated with the Royal Navy's new gunnery school, HMS Excellent. The Egyptians had no opportunity to correct their error; their guns were disabled by direct hits and by the walls of the fortifications falling on their crews. The sailing ships of the line were in two lines with steamers manoeuvring in between. At 16:20 a shell penetrated the main magazine in the south of the city, which exploded killing 1,100 men. The guns ashore fell silent and that night the city was occupied. British losses were light: 18 men killed and 41 wounded. The ships had fired 48,000 rounds.

== Aftermath and long-term effects ==
The rapid collapse of Muhammad Ali's power, with the prospect of bloody chaos in Egypt, was not part of the Allies' plan, and Stopford sent Napier to command the squadron at Alexandria and to observe the situation. Here, acting independently again, he appeared before the city with part of his squadron on November 25 and enforced a blockade. Then without reference to his Admiral or the British government he personally negotiated a peace with Muhammad Ali, guaranteeing him and his heirs the sovereignty of Egypt, and pledging to evacuate Ibrahim's beleaguered army back to Alexandria, if Muhammad Ali in turn renounced all claims to Syria, submitted to the Sultan and returned the Ottoman fleet. Stopford and the British ambassador were furious with this outcome. Stopford repudiated it immediately when he had heard the news and several of the Allied powers declared it void. Despite Napier’s long-standing personal friendship with Lord Palmerston, the arrangement was at first denounced by the British government; but the formal treaty later concluded and confirmed by the Sultan used Napier’s original as the basis for negotiations and differed from it only in minor ways.

After the surrender of Acre, Muhammad Ali finally accepted the terms of the Convention on 27 November 1840. He renounced his claims over Crete and the Hijaz and agreed to downsize his naval forces and his standing army to 18,000 men if he and his descendants would enjoy hereditary rule over Egypt and Sudan. Indeed, a firman was issued by the sultan and confirmed Muhammad Ali's rule over Egypt and the Sudan. Muhammad Ali withdrew from Syria, the Hijaz, the Holy Land, Adana and Crete and handed back the Ottoman fleet.

== See also ==
- Military of ancient Egypt
- Egyptian Armed Forces
- Egyptian Army
- List of wars involving Egypt
