= Virginia Aksan =

Canadian historian

Virginia H. Aksan
- Born: 1946 (age 79–80)
- Education: Allegheny College (BA), University of Toronto (MA, PhD)
- Occupation: Historian of the Ottoman Empire
- Awards: MESA Mentoring Award (2019), Jere L. Bacharach Service Award (2015)

Virginia H. Aksan (born 1946) is a Canadian historian whose main research interest is the Ottoman Empire. She is an honorary member of the Turkish Historical Society.

== Career and education ==
Aksan completed her bachelor's degree at Allegheny College in the United States when she was learning Turkish language at Princeton University. In the following years she completed her master's and doctorate degree at the University of Toronto.

Aksan is a faculty member of history at McMaster University. Currently, she holds the role of Professor Emeritus. In 2019, she received the Middle East Studies Association (MESA) Mentoring Award for her support of students in her department.

Aksan was the president of the Ottoman Turkish Studies Association (OTSA) from 2000-2002 and MESA in 2009.

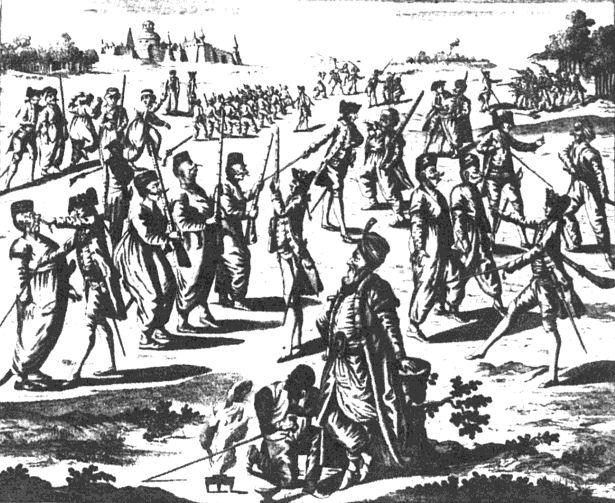
Caricature of the 1783 French Military Mission in Istanbul from Aksan's book Ottoman wars 1700-1870: An Empire Besieged

== Works ==
- An Ottoman Statesman in War and Peace: Ahmed Resmi Efendi, 1700–1783 (Leiden, E.J. Brill, 1995)
- Ottomans and Europeans: Contacts and Conflicts (Istanbul, Isis, 2004)
- Ottoman Wars, 1700–1870: An Empire Besieged (Hammersmith: Pearson/Longman, 2007)
- The Early Modern Ottomans: Remapping the Empire, w/Daniel Goffman (Cambridge: Cambridge University Press, 2007)

== Awards ==
- 2019, MESA Mentoring Award
- 2015, MESA Jere L. Bacharach Service Award
