= Saud bin Muhammad Al Muqrin =

Founder of the House of Saud (1640–1725)

- Emir of Diriyah

13th Emir of Diriyah
- Reign: 1720 – 1725
- Predecessor: Musa ibn Rabi'ah
- Successor: Zayd ibn Markhan
- Born: May 10, 1640; Turaif District, Sheikhdom of Diriyah
- Died: June 11, 1725 (aged 85); Turaif District, Sheikhdom of Diriyah
- Issue: Muhammad; Thunayyan; Mishari; Farhan
Names
- Saud bin Muhammad Bin Muqrin Bin Markhan al-Muraydi
- Dynasty: Muqrin Branch of the House of Mani'
- Father: Muhammad bin Muqrin al-Muraydi
- Mother: Fatima bint Ali
- Religion: Sunni Islam

Saud bin Muhammad Al Muqrin (Note: (Arabic: سعود بن محمد آل مقرن, romanized: Saʿūd bin Muḥammad Āl Muqrin)) (10 May 1640 – 11 June 1725), commonly known as Saud I, was the 13th emir of the Sheikhdom of Diriyah and the founder of the House of Saud. He was the father of Muhammad bin Saud, the 15th emir of Diriyah and founder of the First Saudi State.

== Ancestry ==
Saud was descended from the Muqrin Branch of the House of Mani', whose earliest recorded ancestor was Mani' ibn Rabi'a al-Muraydi, who settled in Diriyah in 1446–1447 with his branch, the Mrudah. The Mrudah are believed to be descended from the Banu Hanifa branch of the Rabi'a tribal confederation.

The House of Saud originated as a leading family in the Sheikhdom of Diriyah, near the modern city of Riyadh in central Najd. In the early 16th century, Saud bin Muhammad’s ancestors took over some date groves—the main form of agriculture in the area—and settled there. Over time, the groves grew, and the branch became recognized as its leaders.

== Descendants ==
Saud had several sons, including Muhammad, Thunayyan, Mishari, and Farhan. Following Saud’s death in 1725, he was succeeded by his son Muhammad.

During Muhammad’s early rule, an internal family conflict emerged after his uncle Muqrin was reportedly killed by him. This dispute created an opportunity for Zayd ibn Markhan to assert control over Diriyah.

Muhammad bin Saud established the First Saudi State in 1727. In 1744, he formed a political and religious alliance with Muhammad Abd al-Wahhab, marking the beginning of expansion across Arabia. Some sources regard Saud as the founder of the House of Saud, while others consider Muhammad bin Saud to be its founder.

== See also ==
- First Saudi state
- Second Saudi state
- Third Saudi state
- Sheikhdom of Diriyah
- List of Saudi rulers
- History of Saudi Arabia
