= Mani' ibn Rabi'a al-Muraydi =

Mani' ibn Rabi'a al-Muraydi مانع بن ربيعة المريدي

Emir of the Sheikhdom of Diriyah
- Reign: 1447 – 14 August 1463
- Predecessor: Established position
- Successor: Rabi'a
- Born: 1400; Eastern Province
- Died: 1463 (aged 62–63); Diriyah, Sheikhdom of Diriyah
- House: House of Mani' (founder)
- Father: Rab'ia
- Religion: Islam

Mani' ibn Rabi'a al-Muraydi (Arabic: مانع بن ربيعة المريدي; 1400 – 1463) is the oldest recorded ancestor of the House of Saud, which currently rules in the Kingdom of Saudi Arabia.

He was a member of the Mrudah clan. The Mrudah are believed to be descended from the Banu Hanifa branch of the larger Rabi'ah tribal confederation.

His original residence was the village of al-Duru', near the town of al-Qatif on the East Arabia coast.

In 1446, he visited his relative Ibn Dir'a in the village of Manfuha, near the city of Hajr (Riyadh) in Central Arabia. Mani' ibn Rabi'a later acquired land in Ghusayba and al-Mulaybeed, later merged and developed into a city called Diriyah, which became the forerunner of this family's territory.

Between 1654 and 1726, there was a fierce rivalry between his descendants, namely the Al-Watban branch (descendants of Watban ibn Rabi'a) against the Al-Muqrin branch (descendants of Muqrin ibn Markhan), as well as wars against other rulers around Diriyah. The Al-Muqrin branch under the leadership of Muhammad ibn Saud finally managed to consolidate power, by forging a close fellowship with Shaykh Muhammad ibn Abd al-Wahhab, to form the First Saudi State which manifested in 1744.

== Genealogy ==
Mani' al-Muraydi
Rabi'a
Musa
Ibrahim
Markhan
Rabi'a	Muqrin
Watban	Muhammad	Markhan
Idris	Ibrahim	Markhan	Rabi'a	Nasir	Saud
Zaid	Musa	Muhammad (Emir of First; Saudi State)	Thunayan	Mishari
Abd al-Aziz (Emir of First; Saudi State)	Abdallah	Ibrahim	Abdul Rahman
Sa'ud (Emir of First; Saudi State)	Turki (Emir of Second; Saudi State)	Thunayan	Mishari (Emir of Second; Saudi State)
Abdullah (Emir of First; Saudi State)	Khalid (Emir of Second; Saudi State)	Faisal (Emir of Second; Saudi State)	Abdullah (Emir of Second; Saudi State)
Abdullah (Emir of Second; Saudi State)	Saud (Emir of Second; Saudi State)	Abdul Rahman (Emir of Second; Saudi State)
Abdulaziz (Emir of Third; Saudi State)
Saud (King of Third; Saudi State)	Faisal (King of Third; Saudi State)	Khalid (King of Third; Saudi State)	Fahd (King of Third; Saudi State)	Abdullah (King of Third; Saudi State)	Salman (King of Third; Saudi State)	Other; 39 sons

== See also ==
- Muhammad ibn Saud
- Diriyah
