= Abdullah bin Muhammad Al Saud =

Saudi royal (1725–1812)

- Born: 1725; Diriyah, Sheikhdom of Diriyah
- Died: 1812 (aged 86–87); Diriyah, Emirate of Diriyah
- Issue: Saud; Zaid; Ibrahim; Turki; Muhammad
- Abdullah bin Muhammad bin Saud bin Muhammad bin Muqrin Al Maridi Al Adui
- Dynasty: House of Saud
- Father: Muhammad bin Saud
- Mother: Moudi bint Abi Wahtan Al Kathir

Abdullah bin Muhammad Al Saud (1725 – 1812) was the youngest son of Muhammad bin Saud who is regarded as the founder of the First Saudi State.

== Biography ==
Abdullah was born in Diriyah. His mother was Moudi bint Abi Wahtan Al Kathir who was instrumental in Muhammad bin Saud's meeting with Muhammad ibn Abdul Wahhab. Leadership of the family passed from his older brother Abdulaziz to a nephew and finally to two grandnephews before being reclaimed by Abdullah's descendants. Abdullah played a prominent part in the military campaigns of his father and brother, notably in the subjugation of the provinces of Sudair, Washm and al-Kharj. However, Abdullah futilely challenged the rule of Abdulaziz and also of Abdullah bin Saud, grandson of Abdulaziz.

His main claim to fame, however, is that he was the father of Turki bin Abdullah, founder of the Second Saudi State from whom all subsequent heads of the House of Saud trace their descent. Another of Abdullah's sons, Zaid, supported Turki in the formation of the Second Saudi State. Two of Abdullah's sons were killed in the battles against Egyptians during the fall of the Emirate of Diriyah, and some of them were brought to Egypt.
