= Sheikhdom of Diriyah =

City-state in central Arabia (14th–17th centuries), predecessor of the First Saudi State

Sheikhdom of Diriyah مشيخة الدرعية
- 1446–1727/44^{Note} (Note: Some historical sources consider 1744 as the end of the Sheikhdom of Diriyah and the start of the First Saudi State, coinciding with the Diriyah Pact. However, the Saudi government officially recognizes 22 February 1727, 17 years before the pact, as the founding date of the First Saudi State and observes it as the official Saudi Founding Day.)
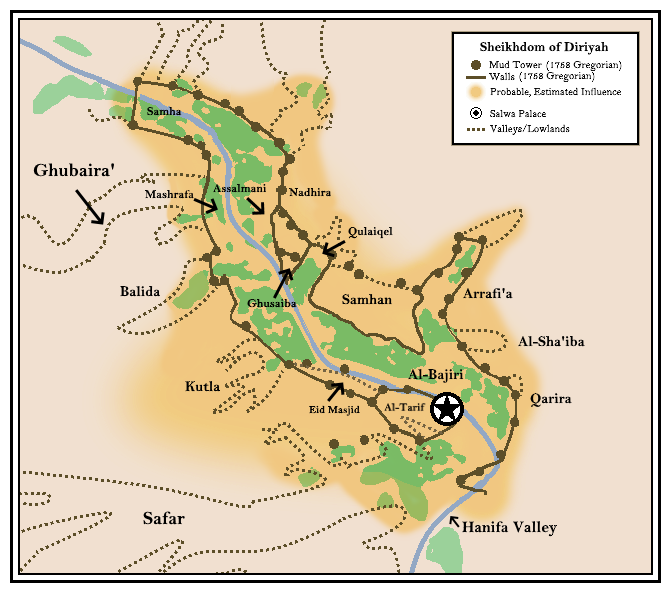
- The historical city of Diriyah with estimated traditional extent of the sheikhdom
- Capital: At-Turaif District
- Common languages: Arabic
- Religion: Sunni Islam
- Emir
  - 1446–1463: Mani' bin Rabi'a (first)
  - 1727–1744: Muhammad bin Saud (last)
- History
  - Migration of Mani' bin Rabi'a and his clan from al-qatif: 1446
  - Enthronement of Muhammad bin Saud: 1727
  - Diriyah pact: 1744
Preceded by	Succeeded by
Banu Hanifa	First Saudi state
- Today part of: Saudi Arabia

The Sheikhdom of Diriyah (Note: Arabic: مشيخة الدرعية, romanized: Mashyakhat ad-Dirʿiyya), also known as the First Diriyah Emirate, was a city-state in central Arabia from the 14th century to the 17th century. It was the predecessor to the First Saudi State. Its capital was At-Turaif District, and it was centered along the banks of Wadi Hanifa. The state was ruled by the Muraydi dynasty of the Durūʿ clan. Over time, the dynasty divided into two branches, Muqrin and Watban, with the Muqrin branch eventually becoming the sole ruling house and the ancestral line of the House of Saud.

== History ==
=== Background ===
The city of Diriyah was founded by Mani' bin Rabi'a Al-Muraidi, which he called al-Diriyah after the town from which they came from, al-Diriyah (a town or a small village located near al-Qatif), and it is attributed to their grandfather Dara'. An area near Wadi Hanifa are Ghusaybah and Al-Mulaybid. When Mani' died, his son, Rabi'a bin Mani', succeeded him, and he headed the people of the city, and the population of Diriyah multiplied. His neighbors, the Yazid family, evacuated them from their villages and attached them to the lands of Diriyah, and after him his son Musa Bin Rabi'a ruled after him, then his son Ibrahim bin Musa and after ibrahim his son Markhan bin Ibrahim, and after the death of Markhan, his two sons Rabi’a and Muqrin were jointly together, and the emirate exchanged after them, their sons, Wataban bin Rabi’a bin Markhan, and Markhan bin Muqrin bin Markhan. Then Nasser bin Muhammad bin Watban, then Muhammad bin Muqrin, then Ibrahim bin Watban, and Idris bin Watban, until the days of Musa bin Rabi’a bin Watban were in the year 1709; It was taken over by Saud I and he died in 1726 and after his death, the oldest man in the family, Zaid bin Markhan bin Watban, was succeeded and killed in 1726. Muhammad bin Saud assumed the emirate of Diriyah, who later became the first emir and imam of the first Saudi state.

=== Under Musa bin Rabi’a Al-Muraidi ===
==== His rise to power ====
Musa reached the emirate of Diriyah by deposing his father, Rabia, Musa tried to kill his father, but he was able to escape after he was wounded by many injuries. Othman bin Bishr says in the title of glory in the history of Najd: “Then he was born to Mani'a al-Rabi’a, and he became famous and expanded his possession and fought against the Yazid family, then after that his son Musa appeared, and he became more famous than his father and many of his neighbors from harmony and others took over the king in the life of his father, He deceived his father, Rabi'ah, and wounded him many times, and fled to Hamad bin Hassan Ibn Touq, the head of Al-uyaynah.

==== His Attacks on Banu Yazid ====
Musa - after his stability in power - gathered his people from the Marada, joined them "Al-Moulafa" and invaded the Yazid family in "Al-Naimah" and "Al-Wasil", killing eighty of them, evacuating them from their lands and annexing them to the lands of Diriyah. Uthman bin Bishr says in the title of glory in the history of Najd: “Then Moses gathered his multitudes of al-ridda and all of his convergence, and the Subuh family of Yazid in al-Naimah and Salaa, killed more than eighty of them and seized and destroyed their homes, and after that he did not stand up for them. He struck this incident in their homes and said, "Their morning is like the morning of goodwill" to the Yazid family. Musa bin Rabia continued in the mandate. '' The sources indicate that the reason for this battle was the intensity of crowding between the Yazid family and the people of Diriyah over the springs of water in Wadi Hanifa, and that Musa sought the help of the Emir of Al-Ayyinah, so he found him. Musa continued to rule over Ad Diriyah until his death, and was succeeded by his son Ibrahim.

=== Under Mohammed bin Muqrin Al-Maridi ===
Muhammad bin Muqrin bin Markhan bin Ibrahim bin Musa bin Rabi’a bin Mani al-Muraidi is one of the rulers of Diriyah and he ruled in two reigns. He is the grandfather of Muhammad bin Saud, founder of the first Saudi state.

==== The first period ====
Sources indicate that Muhammad bin Muqrin avenged his brother Markhan, killing his cousin, Watban bin Rabi’a, and took his place. In particular, the date of Muhammad bin Muqrin's assumption of the emirate or the period of his stay in it is not known, but Ibn Bishr referred in his history to the killing of the Emir of Dir'iyah, Nasir bin Muhammad al-Maridi, in the year 1084 AH / 1672Gregorian, which means that Muhammad bin Muqrin ended his emirate before that date.

The period during which Muhammad bin Muqrin ruled is characterized by ambiguity, and several news have been received that are not without contradiction. It is not known with certainty who Nasser bin Muhammad is, is he Nasser bin Muhammad bin Watban bin Rabi’a, or is he Nasser bin Muhammad bin Muqrin bin Markhan. Some sources refer to the first opinion, meaning that he is from the Watban family, and that Nasser conquered the emirate from Muhammad bin Muqrin in the context of the struggle between the two branches (the Watban family and the Muqrin family) for leadership. Some sources refer to the second opinion, meaning that he is from the Al Muqrin family, and that he is the son of Prince Muhammad bin Muqrin, since his father Muhammad bin Muqrin gave him the emirate in his life.

==== The second period ====
After the killing of Nasir bin Muhammad in the year 1084 AH / 1672 Gregorian, Muhammad bin Muqrin assumed the Emirate of Diriyah for the second time.

==== Attacking the town of Sadus ====
Ibn Bishr indicated that the people of the country of Haremla, along with Muhammad bin Muqrin, and Zamel bin Othman, went to the country of Sidus and destroyed his palace and vandalized it. This war is known as Attack on sadus.

=== Foreign rule by Banu Khalid ===
Between the years between the years 1107 AH / 1695 Gregorian - 1121 AH / 1709 Gregorian, Diriyah was ruled by Sultan bin Hamad Al-Qabas and Abdullah bin Hamad Al-Qabas, who were two brothers from Banu Khalid

=== Under Musa bin Rabi’a Al-Muraidi ===
The people of Diriyah revolted against him and deposed him from the emirate and exiled him from Diriyah, so he sought refuge in al-Ayyaynah and lived there until he was killed in the year 1139 AH / 1727 Gregorian by a stray bullet.

=== Under Muhammad bin Saud ===
The people of Diriyah pledged allegiance to him as a prince after Zaid was killed, His reign is divided into two parts:

- The period of the Emirate of Diriyah: 1139 AH / 1727 Gregorian - 1157 AH / 1744 Gregorian.
- The period of the Imamate after his meeting with Muhammad bin Abd al-Wahhab and the conclusion of what is known as the Diriyah Agreement between them: 1157 AH / 1744 Gregorian - 1179 AH / 1765 Gregorian.

Building the wall around Dir'iyyah in 1758 was one of his works.

== See also ==
- History of Saudi Arabia
- Unification of Saudi Arabia
- First Saudi state
- Second Saudi state
- Third Saudi state
- Saudi Founding Day
