= Rabi'a ibn Mani' al-Muraydi =

Arabian emir

Rabi'a ibn Mani' ibn Rabi'a ibn al-Muraydi (Arabic: ربيعة بن مانع بن ربيعة المريدي) was the second emir of Diriyah beginning in 1463, and son of the founder of the emirate. Rabi'a assumed the kingship of Diriyah after his father's death and continued on the throne until his son Musa overthrew him. Musa tried to assassinate his father in the coup, but Rabi'a managed to escape and fled to the Emirate of al-Uyaynah, where Hamad ibn Hassan gave him refuge.

== Early life ==
His father Mani' lived with his relatives in the east of the peninsula and settled in a place called al-Diriyah, near al-Qatif (not to be confused with Diriyah, the capital of the first Saudi state). In 1447 he corresponded with a relative of his named Ibn Dara'a, influential in al-Yamama, and they reached an agreement: Mani' migrated with his wife and children from the eastern Arabian Peninsula to Wadi Hanifa and Ibn Dara'a sold him his land in Ghasibah and al-Mulibid, abandoned and uninhabited land, for the family to establish a settlement. Mani' made these lands a habitable place and attracted the migration of his tribe for his settlement. With the establishment of this settlement, this abandoned population began to revive and grow, thus creating a new city that was called Al-Diriyah. Mani' was recognized as emir of this growing territory and his son Rabi'a as crown prince, maintaining an active role in the politics of the small emirate. Father and son worked together for the development and expansion of al-Diriyah.

== Reign ==
Upon his father's death on 14 August 1463, Rabi'a succeeded to the throne. During his reign, a large number of villages were founded, the territories of the emirate grew remarkably and the population of Diriyah multiplied, so Rabi'a wanted to expand his domain by conquering a part of al-Yazid's lands and the populations of al-Naima and al-Wasil. The growth of the emirate also led to a lot of power and factional interests. A faction, headed by one of his sons, Musa, seized the emirate through a coup. Musa not only wanted to gain political control of Diriya, but also considered his father a threat to his own interests, so after taking power he decided to kill him. Rab'ia was badly wounded, but along with a group of his supporters managed to escape. Rab'ia resorted to seeking help from the authorities of another small local emirate, al-Uyaynah. Rabi'a managed to communicate with his emir, Hamad ibn Hassan ibn Tuq, who gave him shelter and protection.

Uthman ibn Bishr narrates in one of his works on Najdi history the following: "Rabi'a became famous in Najd, as his kingdom expanded and he fought against the Yazid clan. Then his son his Musa appeared and became more famous than his father his: he seized the throne of his father and fought against all his neighbors. Musa tried to kill his father Rabia, who badly wounded fled and was welcomed by Hamad bin Hasan Ibn Touq, emir of Al-Uyaynah, who honored and protected him for a favor he had previously done him."
