= At-Turaif District =

UNESCO world heritage site in Saudi Arabia

UNESCO World Heritage Site
- Location within Saudi Arabia
- Location: Diriyah, Saudi Arabia
- Criteria: Cultural: iv, v, vi
- Reference: 1329
- Inscription: 2010 (34th Session)
- Coordinates: 24°44′00″N 46°34′32″E

At-Turaif is a historic district located in Diriyah, north-west of Riyadh. It is regarded as one of the more important political and historical sites in Saudi Arabia, as it represented the capital of the early Saudi kingdom. It was the original home of the House of Saud and was the country's first capital from 1727 until Ottoman conquest of the area in 1818.

== History ==
At-Turaif was founded in the 15th century. On July 31, 2010, largely because of the site's Najdi architecture, UNESCO added it to the World Heritage List. Moreover, At-Turaif played a role in the Arabian Peninsula's political unification, serving as the capital of an independent Arab state, representing an important phase in the human settlement of the Najd region.

Sacked by the Ottomans in 1818 in the Siege of Diriyah and abandoned in favour of Riyadh, the area remained deserted until 2000, when the Ad-Diriyah Development Authority was commissioned to carry out an impressive restoration project aimed at transforming this settlement, unknown to most, into an international tourist destination.

== Historic palaces and monuments At-Turaif ==
Historic palaces and monuments in the At-Turaif district include:

- Salwa Palace
- Saad bin Saud Palace
- The Guest House and At-Turaif Bath House
- Imam Mohammad bin Saud Mosque

== At-Turaif restoration program ==
In December 2018, Saudi Arabia launched a restoration program for the At-Turaif historic district aimed at documenting its archaeological sites and transforming it into an open museum.

The project was part of the country's "Saudi Vision 2030" plan aimed at increasing both domestic and international tourism.

The At-Turaif Living Museum (UNESCO World Heritage Site) received the ‘National Winner’ status in the Social, Cultural and Heritage Project of the Year category at the 2020 MEED Project Awards.

== Gallery ==
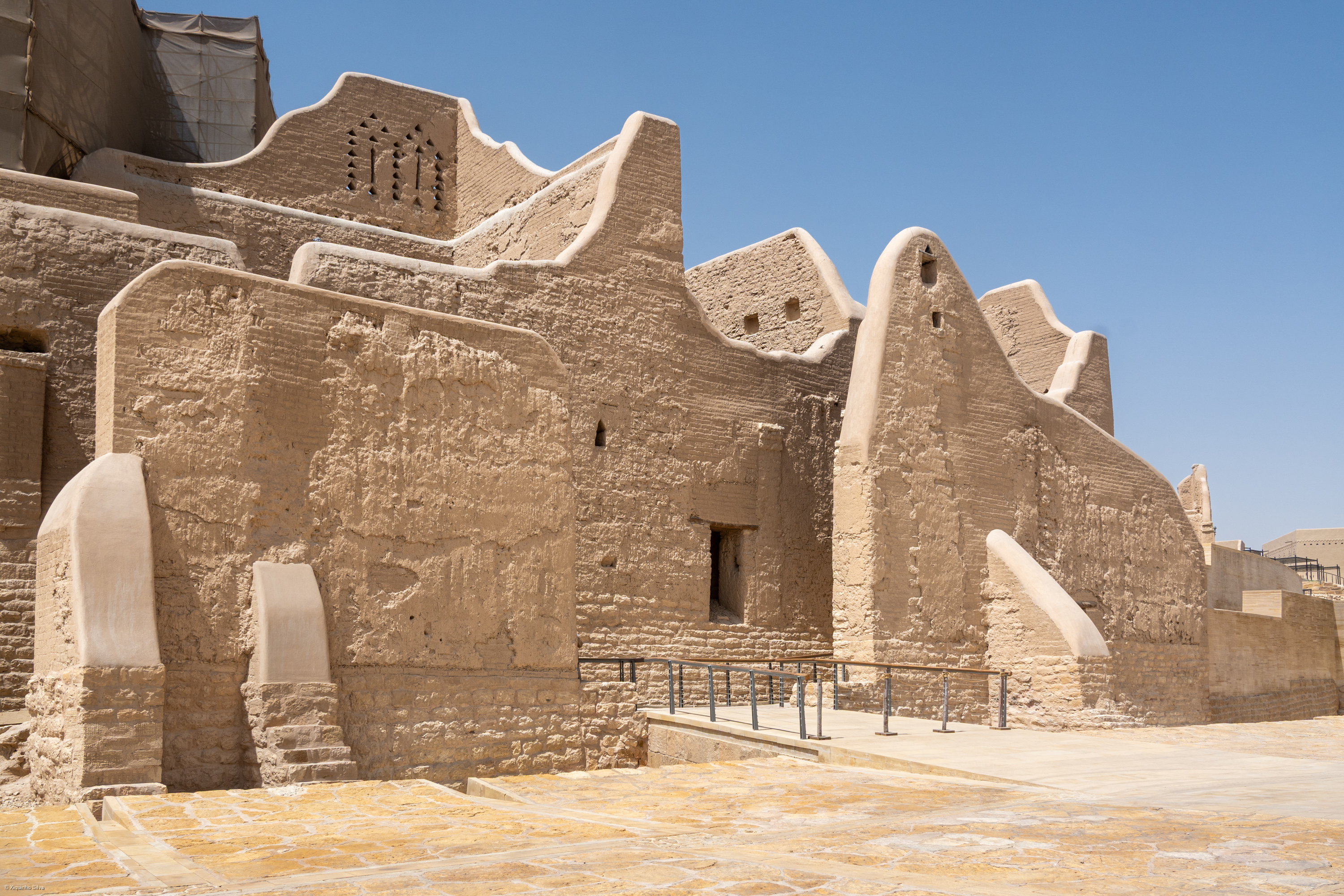
Salwa Palace
