= House of Saud =

Royal family of Saudi Arabia

House of Saud آل سعود
- Royal house
- Royal Standard of the King
- Parent family: Ishmaelites; Qedarites tribe; Adnanites; Rabi'aite tribe; Banu Bakr bin Wa'il; Banu Hanifa; House of Al-Muraydi of the Diriyah (1446; 580 years ago); House of Mani'; Al-Muqrin Branch
- Country: Kingdom of Saudi Arabia (current); Historical: Sheikhdom of Diriyah; Emirate of Diriyah; Emirate of Nejd; Emirate of Riyadh; Emirate of Nejd and Hasa; Sultanate of Nejd; Kingdom of Hejaz and Nejd
- Origin: Diriyah
- Founded: 1720; 306 years ago
- Founder: Saud I (died 1725)
- Current head: Salman; Mohammed bin Salman (de facto)
- Titles: King of Saudi Arabia; Custodian of the Two Holy Mosques; Crown Prince of Saudi Arabia; Prince or Sheikh; Princess or Sheikha Former titles; Great King; King of Hejaz and Nejd; Sultan of Nejd; Emir of Nejd and Hasa; Emir of Riyadh; Emir and Imam of Nejd; Emir and Imam of Diriyah
- Connected families: Al Sudairi (through Hussa bint Ahmed Al Sudairi); Rashidi dynasty (through Fahda bint Asi Al Shammari); Al ash-Sheikh (through Muhammad ibn Abd al-Wahhab); Al-Ajman tribe (through Fahda bint Falah Al Hithlain)
- Traditions: Sunni Islam (Wahhabism)

The House of Saud (Arabic: آل سُعُود, romanized: ʾĀl Suʿūd IPA: [ʔaːl sʊʕuːd]) is the ruling royal family of Saudi Arabia. The family is made up of the descendants of Muhammad bin Saud and his brothers. Muhammad bin Saud founded the Emirate of Diriyah (1727–1818), also known as the First Saudi State. The family's ruling branch, however, consists mainly of the descendants of Ibn Saud, the founder of modern Saudi Arabia. It forms a subtribe of the larger prominent ancient Banu Hanifa tribe of Arabia, from which well-known 7th century Arabian claimant of prophethood Musaylima also originates. The most influential position of the royal family is the King of Saudi Arabia, an absolute monarch. The family in total is estimated to comprise 15,000 members; however, the majority of power, influence and wealth is possessed by a group of about 2,000 of them. Some estimates of the royal family's wealth measure their net worth at $1.4 trillion. This figure includes the market capitalization of Saudi Aramco, the state oil and gas company, and its vast assets in fossil fuel reserves, making them the wealthiest family in the world and arguably the richest in recorded history.

The House of Saud has had four phases: the Sheikhdom of Diriyah (1446–1744); the Emirate of Diriyah (1727–1818), marked by the expansion of Salafism; the Emirate of Nejd (1824–1891), marked with continuous infighting; and the current state (since 1902), which evolved into the Kingdom of Saudi Arabia in 1932 and now wields considerable influence in the Middle East. The family has had conflicts with the Ottoman Empire, the Sharif of Mecca, the Al Rashid family of Ha'il and their vassal houses in Najd along with numerous Islamist groups both inside and outside Saudi Arabia and Shia minority in Saudi Arabia.

The succession to the Saudi Arabian throne was designed to pass from one son of the first king, Ibn Saud, to another. The monarchy was hereditary by agnatic seniority until 2006, when a royal decree provided that future Saudi kings are to be elected by a committee of Saudi princes. King Salman, who reigns currently, first replaced the next crown prince, his brother Muqrin, with his nephew Muhammad bin Nayef. In 2017, Muhammad bin Nayef was replaced by Mohammed bin Salman, King Salman's son, as the crown prince after an approval by the Allegiance Council with 31 out of 34 votes. The king-appointed cabinet includes more members of the royal family.

== Title ==
Genealogical table of the leaders of the Āl Saud

House of Saud is a translation of ʾĀl Saud, an Arabic dynastic name formed by adding the word ʾĀl (meaning "family of" or "House of", not to be confused with Al meaning "the") to the personal name of an ancestor. In the case of the Al Saud, the ancestor is Saud bin Muhammad bin Muqrin, the father of the dynasty's 18th century founder Muhammad bin Saud (Muhammad, son of Saud).

The surname "Al Saud" is carried by any descendant of Muhammad bin Saud or his three brothers Farhan, Thunayyan, and Mishari. Al Saud's other family branches like Saud Al Kabir, the Al Jiluwi, the Al Thunayan, the Al Mishari and the Al Farhan are called cadet branches. Members of the cadet branches hold high and influential positions in government though they are not in the line of succession to the Saudi throne. Many cadet members intermarry within the Al Saud to re-establish their lineage and continue to wield influence in the government.

All male members of the royal family have the title of Emir (Prince). However, the sons and patrilineal grandsons of Kings are referred to by the style "His Royal Highness" (HRH), differing from patrilineal great-grandsons and members of cadet branches who are called "His Highness" (HH), while the reigning king uses the additional title of Custodian of the Two Holy Mosques.

== History ==
=== Origins and early history ===
The earliest recorded ancestor of the Al Saud was Mani' ibn Rabiah Al-Muraydi, who settled in Diriyah in 1446–1447 with his clan, the Mrudah. The Mrudah are believed to be descended from the Banu Hanifa branch of the larger Rabi'ah tribal confederation. The Banu Hanifa played an important role in shaping the Middle East and Arabia from the 6th century.

Mani' was invited to Diriyah by a relative named Ibn Dir, who was the ruler of a group of villages and estates that make up modern-day Riyadh. Mani's clan had been on a sojourn in east Arabia, near Al-Qatif, from an unknown point in time. Ibn Dir handed Mani two estates, called al-Mulaybeed and Ghusayba. Mani and his family settled and renamed the region Al Diriyah after their benefactor Ibn Dir.

The Mrudah became rulers of Al Diriyah, which prospered along the banks of Wadi Hanifa and became an important Najdi settlement. As the clan grew larger, power struggles ensued, with one branch leaving for nearby Dhruma, while another branch (the "Al Watban") left for the town of az-Zubayr in southern Iraq. The Al Muqrin became the ruling family among the Mrudah in Diriyah.

The name of the clan comes from Sheikh Saud ibn Muhammad ibn Muqrin, who died in 1725.

=== Emirate of Diriyah ===
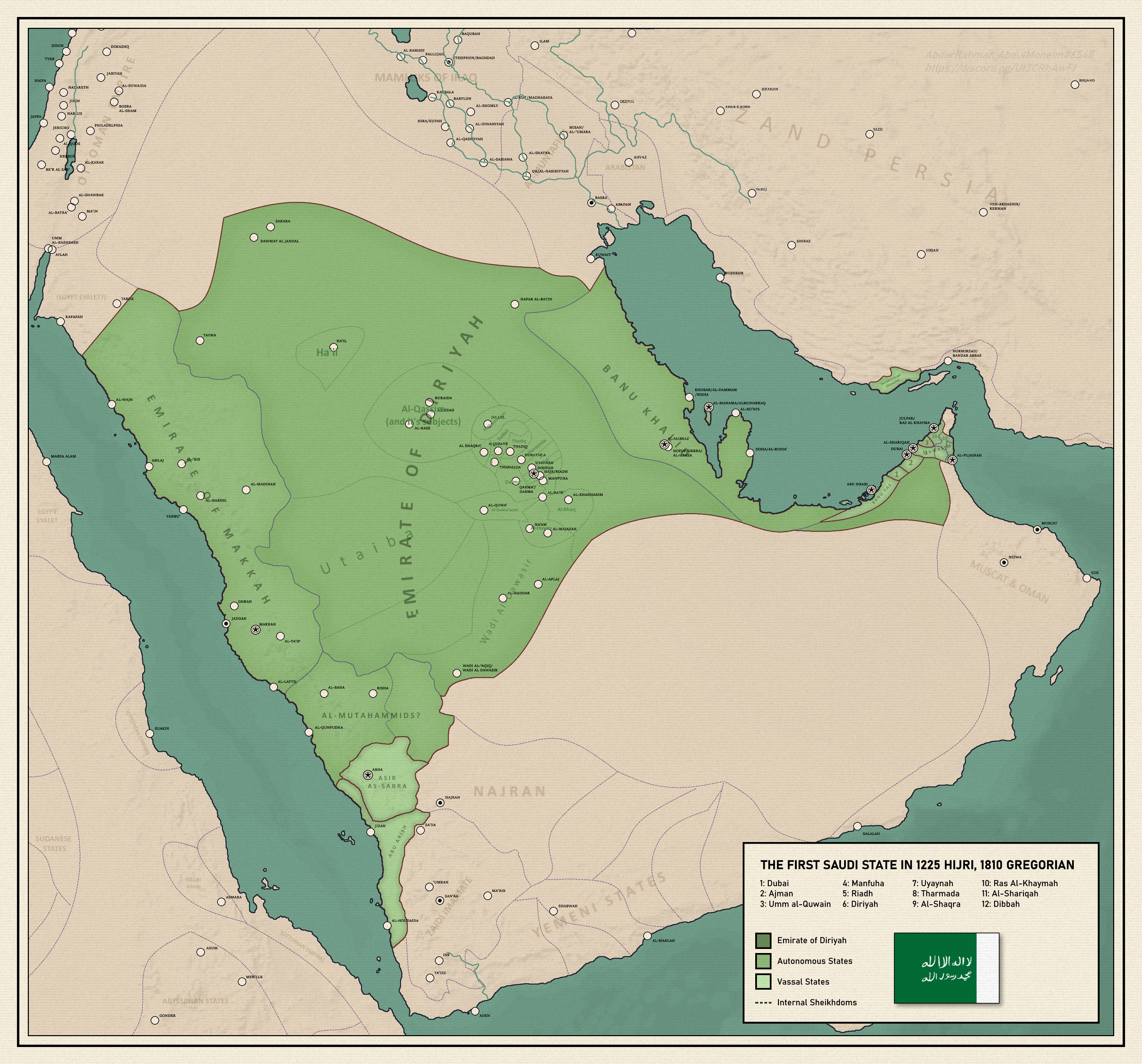
The maximum limits reached by the first Saudi state during the reign of Saud bin Abdulaziz Al Saud in the years 1810-1814, including vassalized territories

The First Saudi State was founded in 1727. This period was marked by conquest of neighboring areas and by religious zeal. At its height, the First Saudi State included most of the territory of modern-day Saudi Arabia, and raids by Al Saud's allies and followers reached into Yemen, Oman, Syria, and Iraq. Islamic scholars, particularly Muhammad ibn Abdul Wahhab and his descendants, are believed to have played a significant role in Saudi rule during this period. The Saudis and their allies referred to themselves during this period as the Muwahhidun or Ahl al-Tawhid ("the monotheists"). Later they were referred to as the Wahhabis, a particularly strict, puritanical Islamic sect, named for its founder.

Leadership of Al Saud during the time of their first state passed from father to son without incident. The first imam, Muhammad bin Saud, was succeeded by his eldest son, Abdulaziz in 1765. In 1802, Abdulaziz's forces led 10,000 Wahhabi soldiers in an attack on the Shi'ite holy city of Karbala, in what is now southern Iraq and where Hussein ibn Ali, the grandson of Muhammad is buried. The Wahhabi soldiers killed more than 2,000 people, including women and children. They plundered the city, demolishing the massive golden dome above Hussein's tomb and loaded hundreds of camels with weapons, jewelry, coins and other valuable goods.

The attack on Karbala convinced the Ottomans and the Egyptians that the Saudis were a threat to regional peace. Abdulaziz was killed in 1803 by an assassin, believed by some to have been a Shi'ite seeking revenge over the sacking of Karbala the year before. Abdul-Aziz was in turn succeeded by his son, Saud, under whose rule the Saudi state reached its greatest extent. By the time Saud died in 1814, his son and successor Abdullah bin Saud had to contend with an Ottoman-Egyptian invasion in the Wahhabi war seeking to retake lost Ottoman Empire territory. The mainly Egyptian force succeeded in defeating Abdullah's forces, taking over the then-Saudi capital of Diriyyah in 1818. Abdullah was taken prisoner and was soon beheaded by the Ottomans in Constantinople, putting an end to the First Saudi State. The Egyptians sent many members of the Al Saud clan and other members of the local nobility as prisoners to Egypt and Constantinople, and razed the Saudi capital of Diriyyah.

=== Emirate of Nejd ===
Flag of the First and Second Saudi State

A few years after the fall of Diriyah in 1818, the Saudis were able to re-establish their authority in Najd, establishing the Emirate of Nejd, commonly known as the Second Saudi State, with its capital in Riyadh.

Compared to the First Saudi State, the second Saudi period was marked by less territorial expansion (it never reconquered the Hijaz or 'Asir, for example) and less religious zeal, although the Saudi leaders continued to go by the title of imam and still employed Salafi religious scholars. The second state was also marked by severe internal conflicts within the Saudi family, eventually leading to the dynasty's downfall. In all but one instance, succession occurred by assassination or civil war, the exception being the passage of authority from Faisal ibn Turki to his son Abdullah ibn Faisal ibn Turki.

=== Present form ===
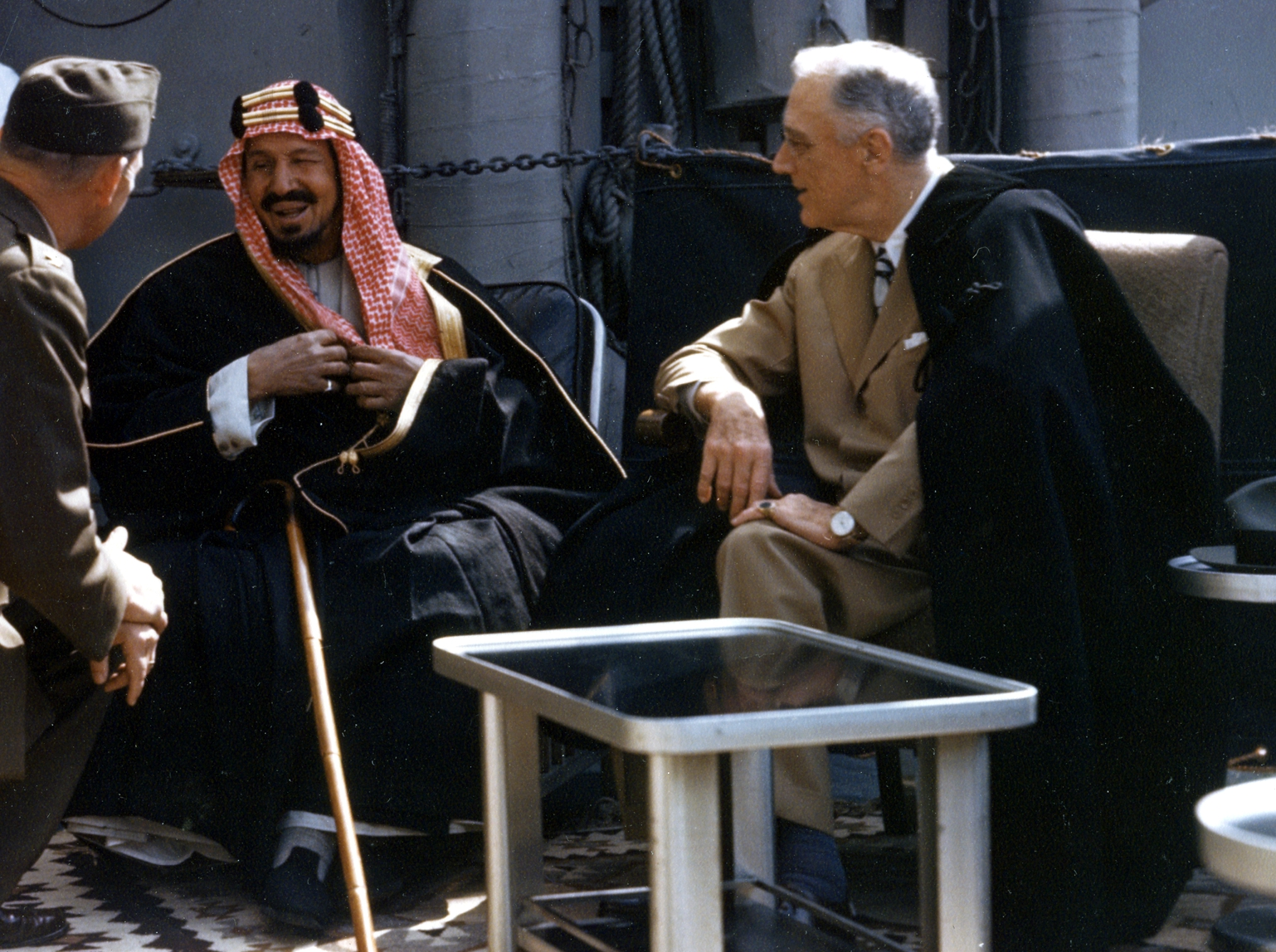
King Abdulaziz and US President Franklin D. Roosevelt in February 1945

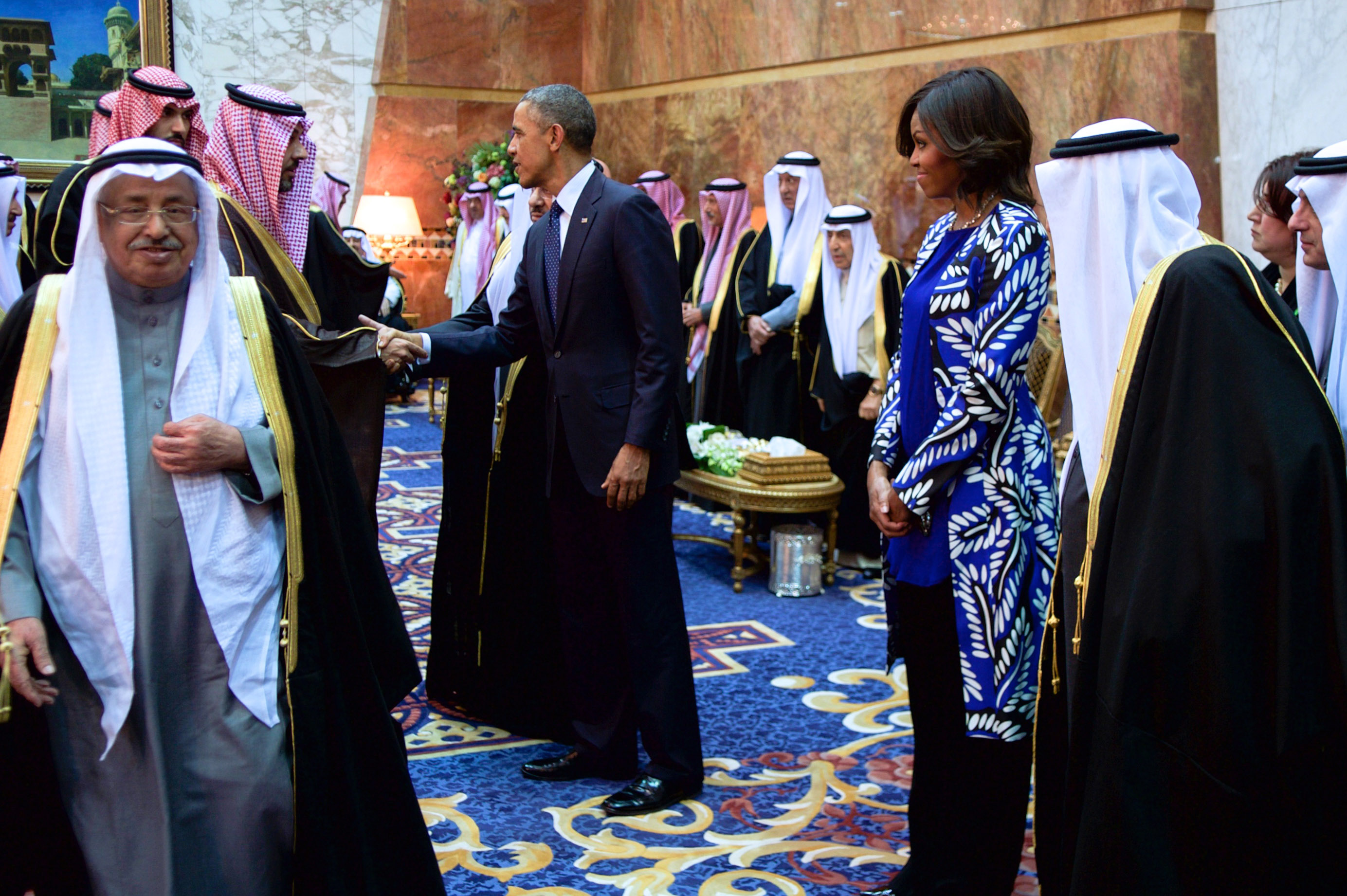
U.S. President Barack Obama offers condolences on death of Saudi King Abdullah, Riyadh, 27 January 2015.

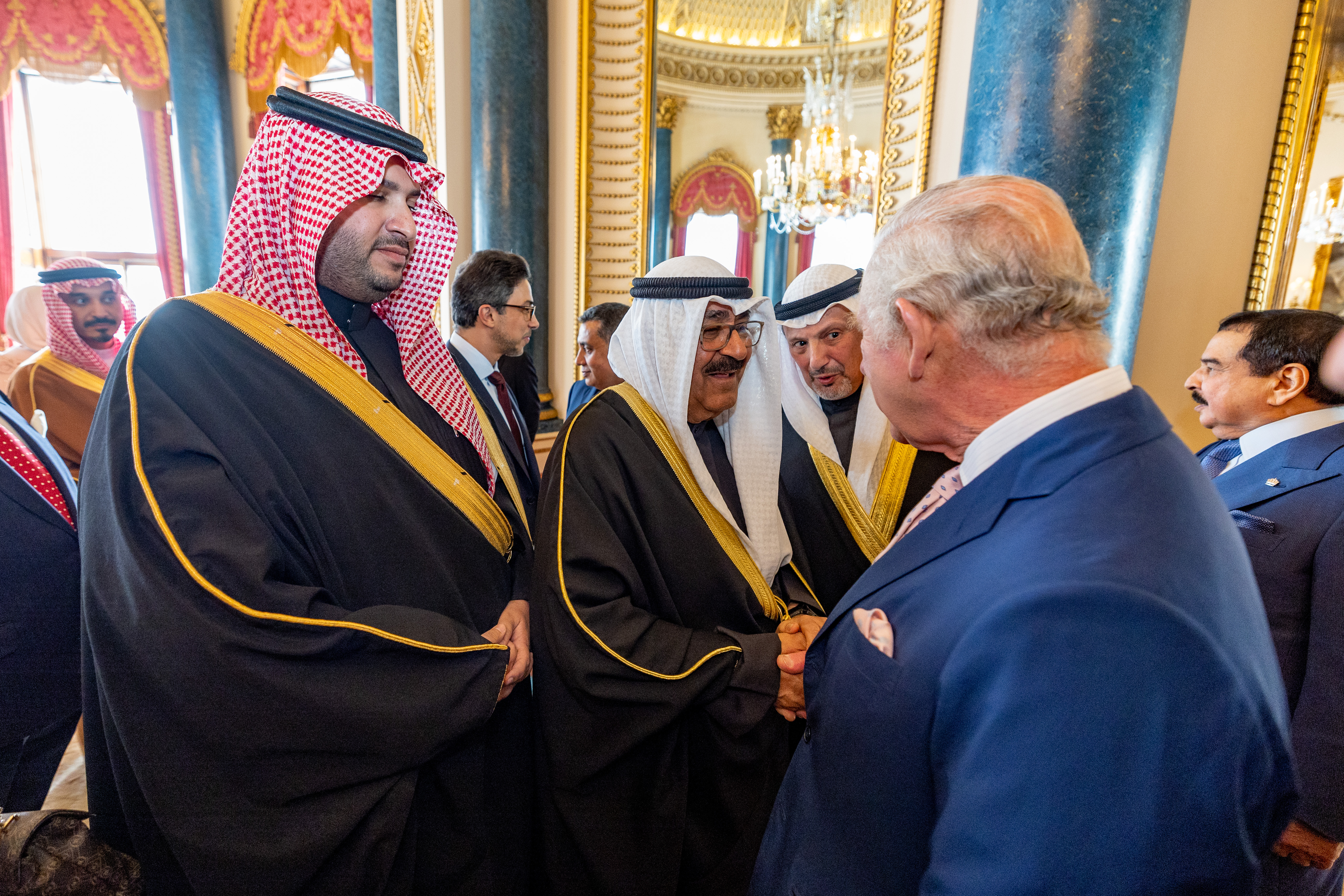
Prince Turki bin Mohammed Al Saud with Britain's King Charles III at Buckingham Palace in London

After his defeat at Mulayda, Abdul Rahman bin Faisal went with his family into exile in the deserts of eastern Arabia among the Al Murra bedouin. Soon afterward, however, he found refuge in Kuwait as a guest of the Kuwaiti emir, Mubarak Al Sabah. In 1902, Abdul Rahman's son, Abdulaziz, took on the task of restoring Saudi rule in Riyadh. Supported by a few dozen followers and accompanied by some of his brothers and relatives, Abdulaziz was able to capture Riyadh's Masmak fort and kill the governor appointed there by Muhammad bin Abdullah Al Rashid. Abdulaziz, reported to have been barely 20 at the time, was immediately proclaimed ruler in Riyadh. As the new leader of the House of Saud, Abdulaziz became commonly known from that time onward as "Ibn Saud" in Western sources, though he is still called "Abdulaziz" in the Arab world.

Ibn Saud spent the next three decades trying to re-establish his family's rule over central Arabia, starting with his native Najd. His chief rivals were the Al Rashid clan in Ha'il, the Sharifs of Mecca in the Hijaz, and the Ottoman Turks in al Hasa. Abdulaziz also had to contend with the descendants of his late uncle Saud ibn Faisal (later known as the "Saud Al Kabir" branch of the family), pretenders to the throne. Though for a time acknowledging the sovereignty of the Ottoman Sultans and even taking the title of pasha, Ibn Saud allied himself to the British, in opposition to the Ottoman-backed Al Rashidis. From 1915 to 1927, Abdulaziz's dominions were a protectorate of the British Empire, pursuant to the 1915 Treaty of Darin.

Ibn Saud won final victory over the Al Rashidis in 1921, making him the ruler of most of central Arabia. He consolidated his dominions as the Sultanate of Nejd. He then turned his attention to the Hijaz, finally conquering it in 1926, just months before the British protectorate ended. For the next five and a half years, he administered the two parts of his dual realm, the Kingdom of Hejaz and Nejd, as separate units.

By 1932, Ibn Saud had disposed of all his main rivals and consolidated his rule over much of the Arabian Peninsula. He united his dominions into the Kingdom of Saudi Arabia that year. His father, Abdul Rahman, retained the honorary title of "imam". In 1937, near Dammam, American surveyors discovered what later proved to be Saudi Arabia's vast oil reserves. Before the discovery of oil, many family members were destitute.

Ibn Saud sired dozens of children by his many wives. He had at most four wives at a time, divorcing many times. He made sure to marry into many of the noble clans and tribes within his territory, including the chiefs of the Bani Khalid, Ajman, and Shammar tribes, as well as the Al ash-Sheikh (descendants of Muhammad ibn Abd al-Wahhab). He also arranged for his sons and relatives to enter into similar marriages. He appointed his eldest surviving son, Saud as heir apparent, to be succeeded by the next eldest son, Faisal. The Al Saudi family became known as the "royal family", and each member, male and female, was accorded the title amir ("prince") or amira ("princess"), respectively.

Ibn Saud died in 1953, after having cemented an alliance with the United States in 1945. He is still celebrated officially as the "Founder", and only his direct descendants may take on the title of "his or her Royal Highness". The date of his recapture of Riyadh in 1902 was chosen to mark Saudi Arabia's centennial in 1999 (according to the Islamic lunar calendar).

Upon Ibn Saud's death, his son Saud assumed the throne without incident, but his lavish spending led to a power struggle with his brother, Crown Prince Faisal. In 1964, the royal family forced Saud to abdicate in favor of Faisal, aided by an edict from the country's grand mufti. During this period, some of Ibn Saud's younger sons, led by Talal ibn Abdul Aziz, defected to Egypt, calling themselves the "Free Princes" and calling for liberalization and reform, but were later induced to return by Faisal. They were fully pardoned but were also barred from any future positions in government.

Faisal was assassinated in 1975 by a nephew, Faisal bin Musaid, who was promptly executed. Another brother, Khalid, assumed the throne. The next prince in line had actually been Prince Muhammad, but he had relinquished his claim to the throne in favor of Khalid, his only full brother.

Khalid died of a heart attack in 1982, and was succeeded by Fahd, the eldest of the powerful "Sudairi Seven", so-called because they were all sons of Ibn Saud by his wife Hassa Al Sudairi. Fahd did away with the previous royal title of "his Majesty" and replaced it with the honorific "Custodian of the Two Holy Mosques", in reference to the two Islamic holy sites in Mecca and Medina, in 1986.

A stroke in 1995 left Fahd largely incapacitated. His half-brother, Crown Prince Abdullah, gradually took over most of the king's responsibilities until Fahd's death in August 2005. Abdullah was proclaimed king on the day of Fahd's death and promptly appointed his younger brother, Sultan bin Abdulaziz, the minister of defense and Fahd's "Second Deputy Prime Minister", as the new heir apparent. On 27 March 2009, Abdullah appointed Prince Nayef Interior Minister as his "second deputy prime minister" and Crown Prince on 27 October. Sultan died in October 2011 while Nayef died in Geneva, Switzerland on 15 June 2012. On 23 January 2015, Abdullah died after a prolonged illness, and his half-brother, Crown Prince Salman, was declared the new king.

Many princes and government officials were arrested in 2017 in an alleged anti corruption campaign by the king and crown prince. Then-United States President Donald Trump expressed support for the arrests.

== Political power ==
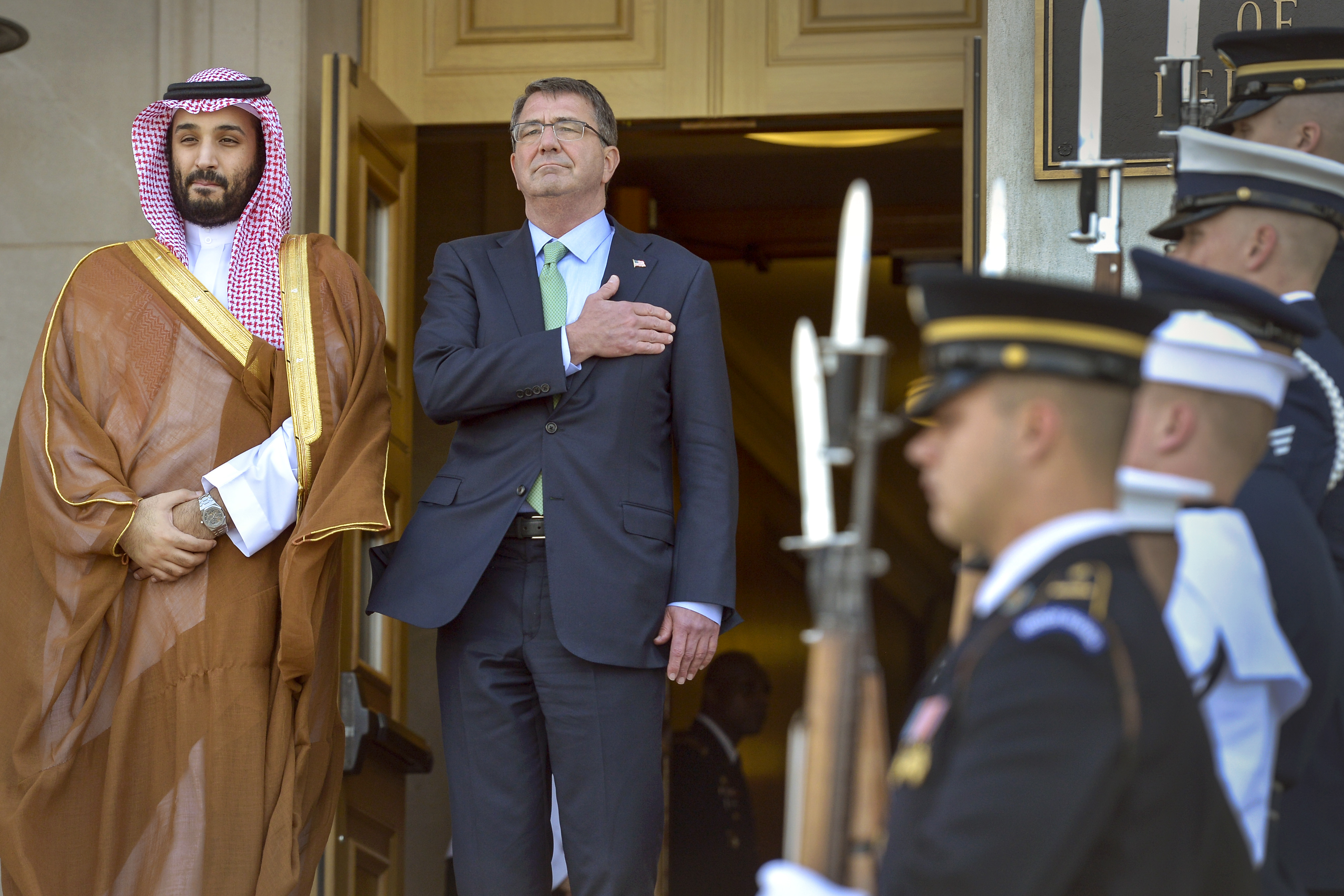
Crown Prince and Defence Minister "MbS" with U.S. Secretary of Defense Ashton Carter, Pentagon, 13 May 2015

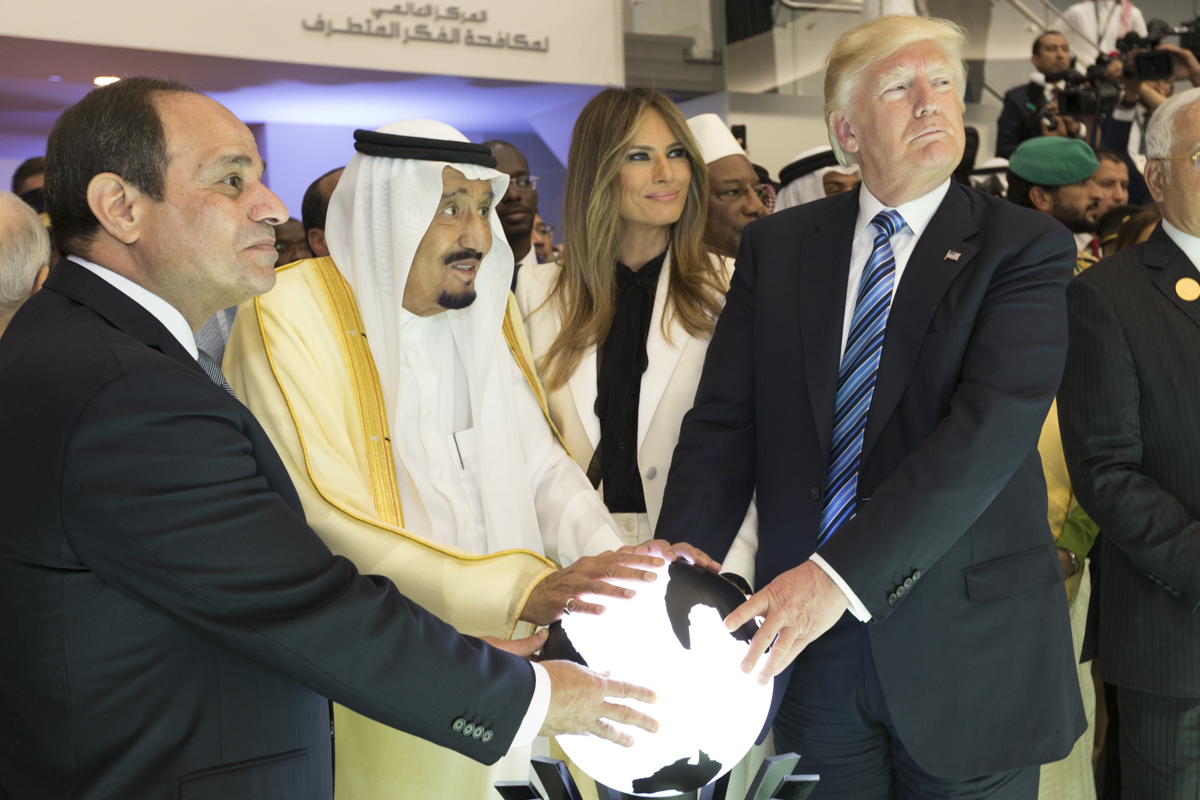
US President Donald Trump with the First Lady of the United States Melania Trump, King Salman, and Egyptian president Abdel Fattah el-Sisi at the 2017 Riyadh summit

The head of the House of Saud is the King of Saudi Arabia who serves as Head of State and monarch of the Kingdom of Saudi Arabia. The king holds almost absolute political power. The king appoints ministers to his cabinet who supervise their respective ministries in his name. The key ministries of Defence, the Interior and Foreign Affairs are usually held by members of the Saud family, as are all of the thirteen regional governorships. Most portfolios, however, such as Finance, Labour, Information, Planning, Petroleum Affairs and Industry, have traditionally been given to commoners, often with junior Al Saud members serving as their deputies. House of Saud family members also hold many of the kingdom's critical military and governmental departmental posts. Ultimate power in the kingdom has always rested upon the Al Saudis, though support from the Ulema, the merchant community, and the population at large has been key to the maintenance of the royal family's political status quo.

Long-term political and government appointments have resulted in the creation of "power fiefdoms" for senior princes, such as those of King Faisal, who was foreign minister almost continuously from 1932 to 1975; King Abdullah, who had been commander of the National Guard since 1963 (until 2010, when he appointed his son to replace him); former Crown Prince Sultan, minister of defence and aviation from 1962 until his death in 2011; former Crown Prince Nayef who was the minister of interior from 1975 to his death in 2012; Prince Saud who had been minister of foreign affairs since 1975; and King Salman, who was minister of defense and aviation before he was crown prince and governor of the Riyadh Province from 1962 to 2011. The current minister of defense is Prince Mohammad bin Salman, the son of King Salman and crown prince.

Such terms of service have enabled senior princes to mingle their personal wealth with that of their respective domains. They have often appointed their own sons to senior positions within their own portfolios. Examples of these include Prince Mutaib bin Abdullah as assistant commander in the National Guard until 2010; Prince Khalid bin Sultan as assistant minister of defence until 2013; and Prince Mansour bin Mutaib as assistant minister for municipal and rural affairs until he replaced his father in 2009. In cases where portfolios have notably substantial budgets, appointments of younger, often full, brothers have been necessary, as deputies or vice ministers, ostensibly to share the wealth and the burdens of responsibility, of each fiefdom. Examples of these include Prince Abdul Rahman who was vice minister of defence and aviation under Prince Sultan; Prince Badr, deputy to King Abdullah in the National Guard; Prince Sattam, who was deputy governor of Riyadh during King Salman's term; and Prince Ahmed, who held the deputy minister's portfolio under Prince Nayef's interior ministry.

Unlike Western royal families, the Saudi monarchy has not had a clearly defined order of succession. Historically, upon becoming king, the monarch has designated an heir apparent to the throne who serves as crown prince of the kingdom. Upon the king's death, the crown prince becomes king, and during the king's incapacitation the crown prince, likewise, assumes power as regent. Although other members of the Al Saudis hold political positions in the Saudi government, it is only the king and crown prince who legally constitute the political institutions.

The royal family is politically divided by factions based on clan loyalties, personal ambitions and ideological differences. The most powerful clan faction is known as the 'Sudairi Seven', comprising the late King Fahd and his full brothers and their descendants. Ideological divisions include issues over the speed and direction of reform, and whether the role of the ulema should be increased or reduced. There were divisions within the family over who should succeed to the throne after the accession or earlier death of Prince Sultan. When Prince Sultan died before ascending to the throne on 21 October 2011, King Abdullah appointed Prince Nayef as crown prince. The following year, Prince Nayef also died before ascending to the throne.

== Succession ==
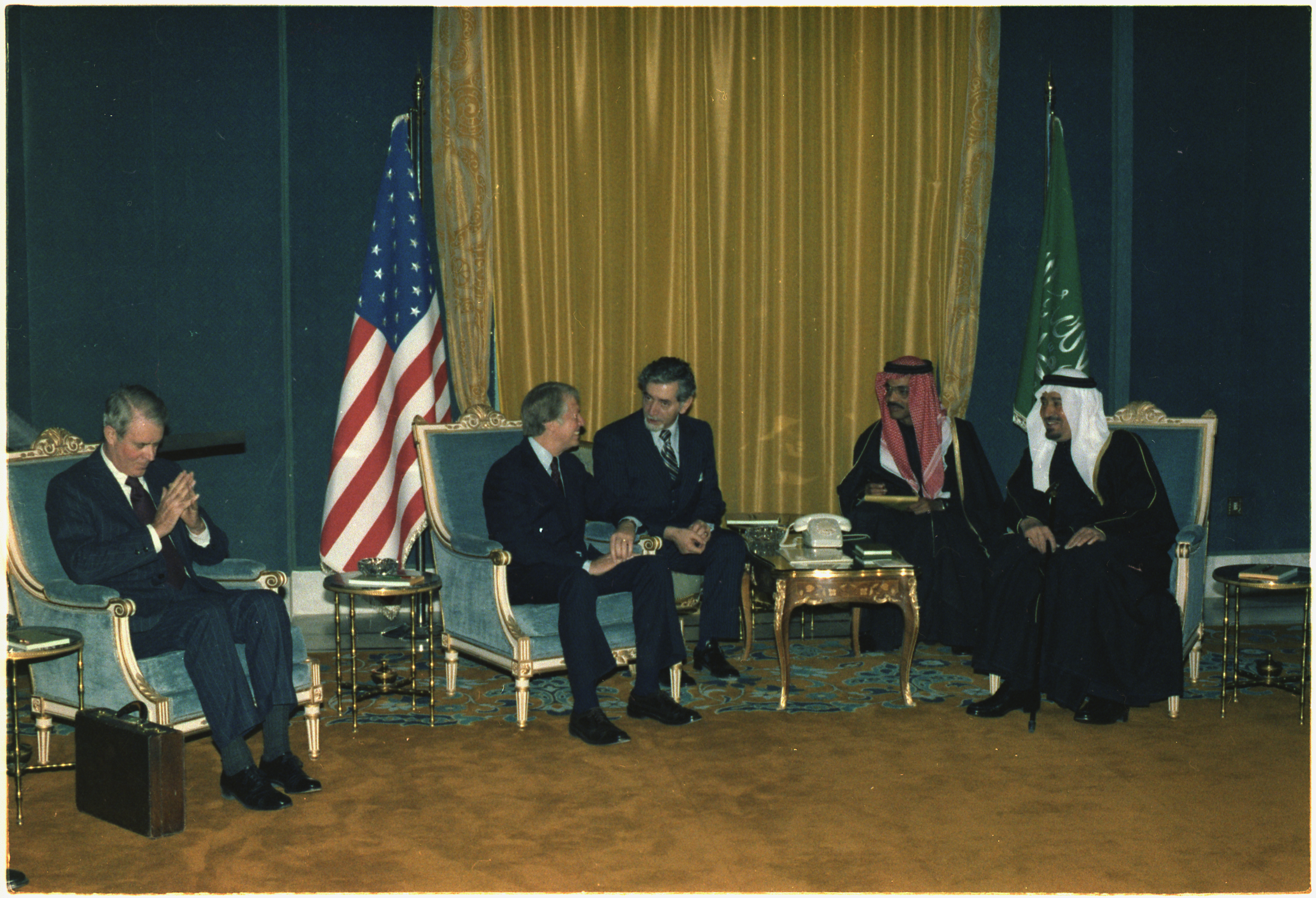
U.S. President Jimmy Carter meets with King Khalid and Crown Prince Fahd in January 1978.

Succession has been from brother to brother since the death of the founder of modern Saudi Arabia. Abdulaziz was succeeded by his son Saud who was succeeded by his half-brother Faisal. Faisal was succeeded by his brother Khalid who, in turn, was succeeded by his half-brother Fahd. Fahd was succeeded by his half-brother Abdullah, and Abdullah by his half-brother Salman, the current King. Salman appointed his half-brother Muqrin as Crown Prince in January 2015 and removed him in April 2015. Even Abdulaziz's youngest son was to turn 70 in 2015. Abdulaziz, in 1920, had said that the further succession would be from brother to brother, not from father to son.

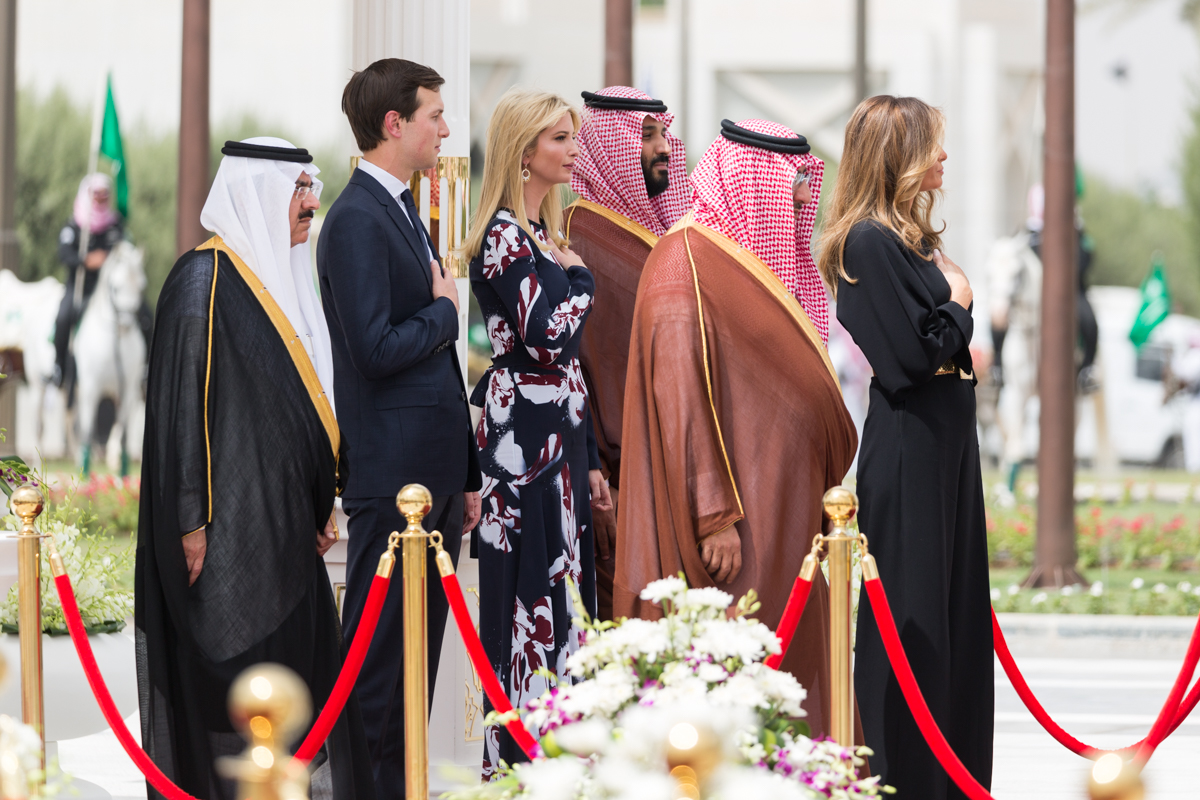
Crown Prince Muhammad bin Nayef, Deputy Crown Prince Mohammad bin Salman, Jared Kushner, Ivanka Trump, King Salman bin Abdulaziz, and Melania Trump, Riyadh, 20 May 2017

King Salman ended the brother-to-brother succession and appointed his 56-year-old nephew Muhammad bin Nayef as crown prince in April 2015, thus making the next succession from uncle to nephew. At the same time, King Salman appointed his son, Mohammad bin Salman, as deputy crown prince, thus making the next succession from cousin to cousin, as Muhammad bin Salman is the cousin of Crown Prince Muhammad bin Nayef. However, in June 2017, Salman elevated Mohammad bin Salman to crown prince, following his decision to strip Muhammad bin Nayef of all positions, making his son heir apparent to the throne, and making the next succession from father to son, for the first time since 1953, when Saud bin Abdulaziz Al Saud succeeded his father, the founder of Saudi Arabia, Ibn Saud.

Amid international outcry over the killing of Jamal Khashoggi, members of the Saudi royal family were allegedly distressed over the prospect of the crown prince becoming the next king. It was reported that dozens of princes and members of the Al Saud family were interested in seeing Prince Ahmed become the next king instead. During his London tour, Prince Ahmed criticized the Saudi leadership. He was also one of the three members of the ruling family to oppose Mohammad bin Salman becoming the crown prince in 2017.

== Wealth ==
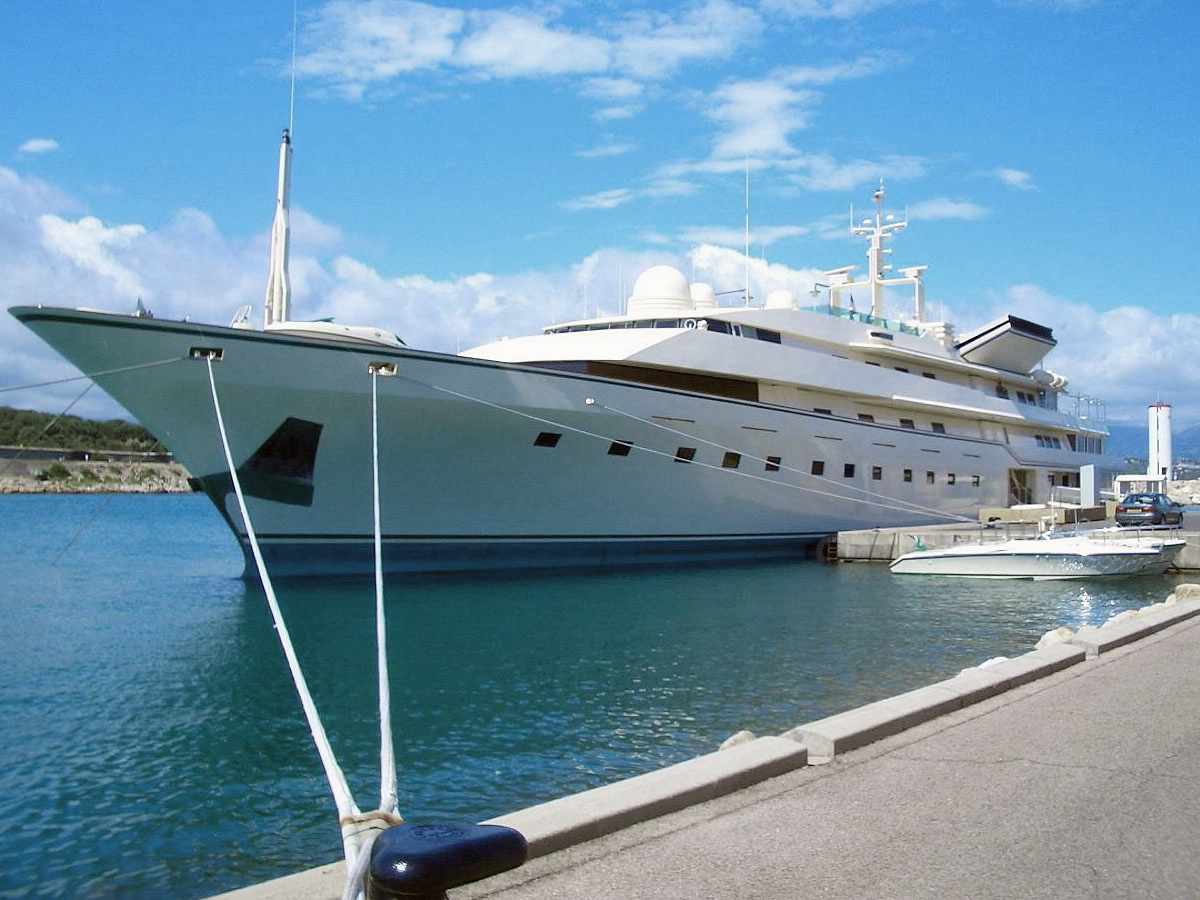
Luxury yacht Kingdom 5KR owned by Saudi royal family, docked in Antibes, French Riviera

In June 2015, Forbes listed businessman Prince Al-Waleed bin Talal, a grandson of Abdulaziz, the first king of Saudi Arabia, as the 34th-richest man in the world, with an estimated net worth of US$22.6 billion.

As of 2020, the combined net worth of the entire royal family has been estimated at around US$100 billion, which makes them the richest royal family among all monarchs, as well as one of the wealthiest families in the world. Some estimates of the Royal Family's wealth put the figure as high as $1.4 trillion, which includes holdings in Saudi Aramco.

== Opposition and controversy ==
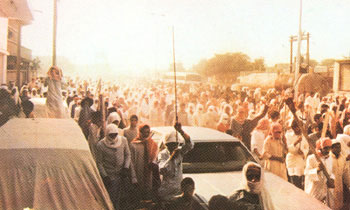
Demonstrators in Eastern Province during the 1979 Qatif Uprising

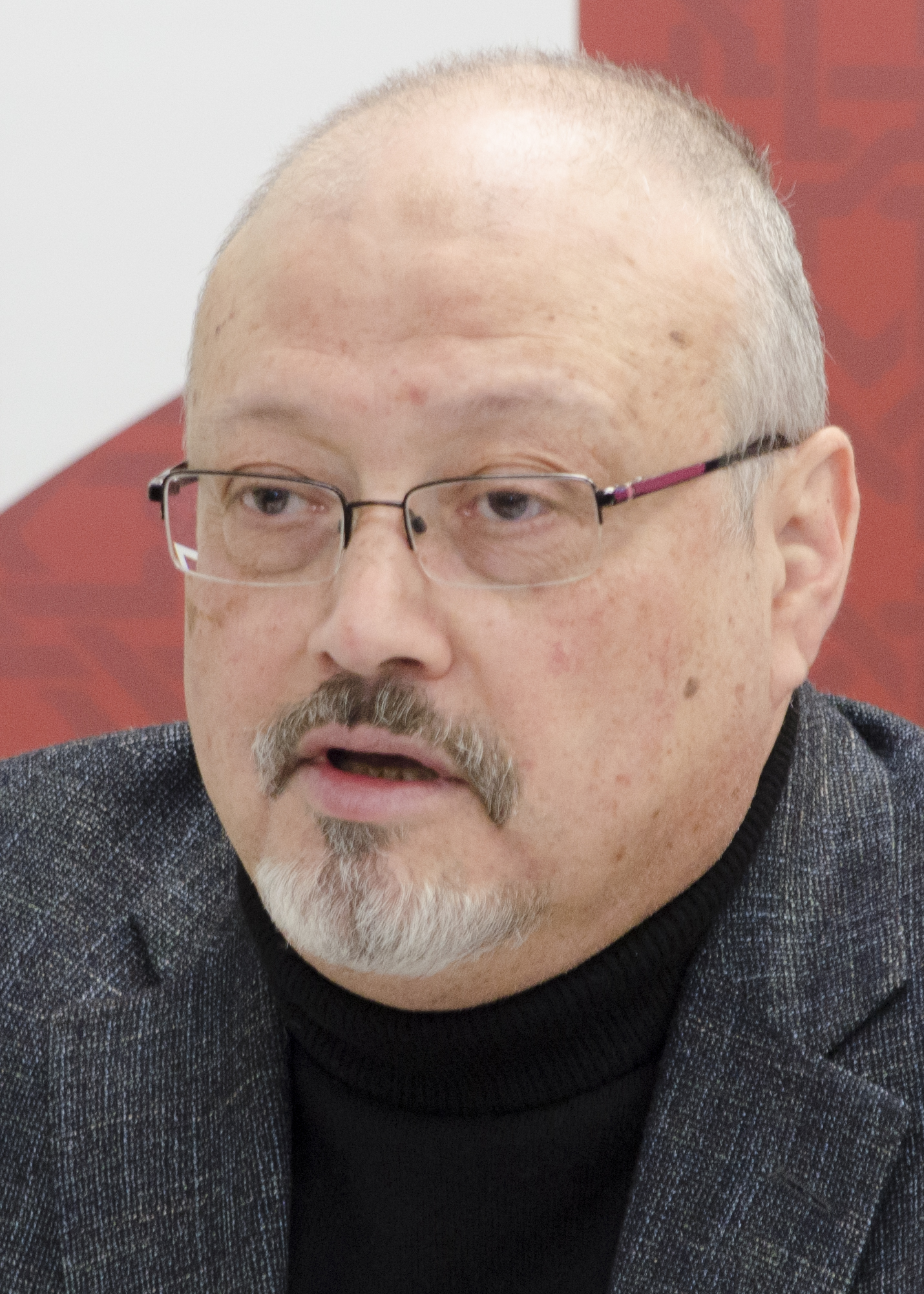
Journalist Jamal Khashoggi, murdered at Saud embassy in Turkey because of his opposition to the government

Due to its authoritarian and quasi-theocratic rule, the House of Saud has attracted much criticism during its rule of Saudi Arabia. There have been numerous incidents, including the Wahhabi Ikhwan militia uprising during the reign of Ibn Saud. Osama Bin Laden, a critic of the US, was also a critic of Saudi Arabia and was denaturalized in the mid 1990s.

On 20 November 1979, the Grand Mosque seizure saw the al-Masjid al-Haram in Mecca violently seized by a group of 500 heavily armed and provisioned Saudi dissidents led by Juhayman al-Otaybi and Abdullah al-Qahtani, consisting mostly of members of the former Ikhwan militia of Otaibah but also of other peninsular Arabs and a few Egyptians enrolled in Islamic studies at the Islamic University of Madinah. The Saudi royal family turned to the Ulema, who duly issued a fatwa permitting the storming of the holy sanctuary by Saudi forces, aided by French special ops units. According to Lawrence Wright, the GIGN commandos did first convert to Islam prior to the raid. Most of those responsible, including Al-Otaybi himself, were soon beheaded publicly in four cities of Saudi Arabia.

In January 2016, Saudi Arabia executed the prominent Shia cleric Sheikh Nimr, who had called for pro-democracy demonstrations, along with forty-seven other Saudi Shia citizens sentenced by the Specialized Criminal Court on terrorism charges.

Since May 2017, in response to protests against the government, the predominantly Shia town of Al-Awamiyah has been put under full siege by the Saudi military. Residents are not allowed to enter or leave, and the Saudi military indiscriminately shells the neighborhoods with airstrikes, mortar fire along with snipers shooting residents. Dozens of Shia civilians were killed, including a three-year-old. The Saudi government claims it is fighting terrorists in al-Awamiyah.

Crown Prince Mohammed bin Salman kept his own mother away from his father for more than two years, fearing that she would stop the king from giving eventual power to him. Princess Fahda bint Falah Al Hithlain, third wife of King Salman, was said to be in America for medical treatment. However, according to American intelligence, this was refuted, stating that she was not in the country.

Some Royals have been criticised for various human rights violations, including the assassination of Jamal Khashoggi, treatment of workers, the Saudi-led intervention in Bahrain and the Yemen war.

The Reuters news agency reported on 23 June 2020 that Crown Prince Mohammed bin Salman had allegedly threatened and intimidated a former intelligence officer, Saad al-Jabri, along with his family of adult children, from returning to Saudi Arabia from exile in Canada. Al-Jabri was a long-time aide to the former crown prince, Prince Mohammed bin Nayef, who was ousted in 2017. Al-Jabri allegedly has access to documents containing information sensitive and pivotal for the crown prince's leadership.

A group of intellectuals from Saudi Arabia, exiled in the US, the UK, and elsewhere, launched a political party in opposition to the royal family ruling the kingdom. The launch of the party was announced in September 2020 and was launched on the 2nd death anniversary of Jamal Khashoggi. The National Assembly Party (NAAS – people in Arabic) was launched with the aim of gathering the support of people, both inside and outside Saudi Arabia, against the ruling royals King Salman and Crown Prince Mohammed bin Salman. Madawi al-Rasheed, a scholar, is also the co-founder of NAAS. Other members of the party include scholar Abdullah al-Aoudh, comedian and vlogger Omar Abdulaziz, and activist Yahya Assiri. The party's launch took place online from London as the Basic Law of Saudi Arabia prohibits the formation of political parties. Forming a political party is considered sedition, punishable with lengthy jail terms.

Some members of the royal family have ill-treated their employees, even while visiting other countries. For example, Princess Buni Al Saud, a niece of King Fahd, pushed the staff down the stairs. Another princess attacked her worker with the help of a bodyguard. A Saudi prince and his children abused their maids when they were in France.

== Heads ==
=== Emirate of Diriyah ===
Name	Lifespan	Reign start	Reign end	Notes	Family	Image
Saud I: سعود الأول	1640 – 1725	1720	1725 (death by natural causes)	Was the eponymous ancestor of the House of Saud; Son of Emir Muhammad bin Muqrin	Muqrin	

=== First Saudi state ===
Name	Lifespan	Reign start	Reign end	Notes	Family	Image
Muhammad I: محمد الأول	1687 – 1765	1727	1765 (death by natural causes)	Reign established by conquest Son of Emir Saud I	Saud	
Abdul-Aziz I: عبد العزيز الأول	1720 – 1803	1765	12 November 1803 (assassinated)	Son of Imam Muhammad I and Mody bint Sultan Al Kathiri	Saud	
Saud II: سعود الثاني	1748 – 1814	1803	April 1814 (death by natural causes)	Son of Imam Abdul-Aziz I and Al-Jawhara bint Othman Al Muammar	Saud	
Abdullah I: عبد الله الأول	1785 – 1818	1814	Died May 1819 (Execution by the Ottoman Empire)	Son of Imam Saud II; The last rulers of the first Saudi state	Saud	Abdullah bin Saud

=== Second Saudi state ===
Name	Lifespan	Reign start	Reign end	Notes	Family	Image
1 Turki: تركي	1755 – 1834	1824	1834 (assassinated)	Founder of the second Saudi state Son of Prince Abdullah bin Muhammad Al Saud	Saud	
2 Mishari: مشاري	1786 – 1834	1824 (40 day rule)	1834 (executed)	Son of Prince Abdul Rahman bin Hassan bin Mishari Al Saud	Saud	
3 and 6 Faisal I: فيصل الاول	1785 – 1865	1834–1838 (first time); 1843–1865 (second time)	1865 (death by natural causes)	Son of Imam Turki and Haya bint Hamad bin Ali Al-Anqari Al-Tamimi	Saud	
4 Khalid I: خالد الاول	1811 – 1865	1838	1841 (dismissal)	Distant cousin Son of Imam Saud II	Saud	
5 Abdullah II: عبد الله الثاني	? – July 1843	1841	1843 (dismissal)	Distant cousin Son of Prince Thunayan bin Ibrahim bin Thunayan bin Saud	Saud	
7 and 9 and 12 Abdullah III: عبد الله الثالث	1831 – 2 December 1889	1865–1871 (first time); 1871–1873 (second time); 1876–1889 (third time)	1889 (death by natural causes)	Son of Imam Faisal I and Haya bint Hamad bin Ali Al-Anqari Al-Tamimi	Saud	
8 and 10 Saud III: سعود الثالث	1833 – 1875	1871 (first time); 1873–1875 (second time)	1889 (death by natural causes)	Son of Imam Faisal I and Dashisha bint Didan bin Mandeel Al-Omari Al-Khalidi	Saud	
11 and 13 Abdul-Rahman: عبد الرحمن	1850 – 1925	1875–1876 (first time); 1889–1891 (second time)	1891 (His rule is over)	Son of Imam Faisal I and Sarah bint Mashari bin Abdulrahman Al Saud; The last rulers of the second Saudi state	Saud	Saud bin Faisal bin Turki

=== Third Saudi state ===
Name	Lifespan	Reign start	Reign end	Notes	Family	Image
Abdul-Aziz II: عبد العزيز الثاني	15 January 1875 – 9 November 1953 (aged 78)	13 January 1902 (aged 27)	9 November 1953 (death by natural causes)	Reign established by conquest Son of Imam Abdul Rahman and Sara bint Ahmed Al Sudairi	Saud	Ibn Saud of Saudi Arabia
Saud IV: سعود الرابع	12 January 1902 – 23 February 1969 (aged 67)	9 November 1953 (aged 51)	2 November 1964 (abdicated)	Son of King Abdulaziz and Wadha bint Muhammad Al Orair	Saud	Saud of Saudi Arabia
Faisal II: فيصل الثاني	14 April 1906 – 25 March 1975 (aged 68)	2 November 1964 (aged 58)	25 March 1975 (assassinated)	Son of King Abdulaziz and Tarfa bint Abdullah Al Sheikh	Saud	Faisal of Saudi Arabia
Khalid II: خالد الثاني	13 February 1913 – 13 June 1982 (aged 69)	25 March 1975 (aged 62)	13 June 1982 (death by natural causes)	Son of King Abdulaziz and Al Jawhara bint Musaed bin Jiluwi Al Saud	Saud	Khalid of Saudi Arabia
Fahd: فهد	16 March 1921 – 1 August 2005 (aged 84)	13 June 1982 (aged 61)	1 August 2005 (death by natural causes)	Son of King Abdulaziz and Hussa bint Ahmed Al Sudairi	Saud	Fahd of Saudi Arabia
Abdullah IV: عبد الله الرابع	1 August 1924 – 23 January 2015 (aged 90)	1 August 2005 (aged 81)	23 January 2015 (death by natural causes)	Son of King Abdulaziz and Fahda bint Asi Al Shuraim	Saud	Abdullah of Saudi Arabia
Salman: سلمان	31 December 1935 (age 90)	23 January 2015 (aged 79)	Incumbent	Son of King Abdulaziz and Hussa bint Ahmed Al Sudairi; The last rulers of the third Saudi state	Saud	Salman of Saudi Arabia

== Most notable current members ==
=== Sons of King Abdulaziz ===
The list of King Abdulaziz's surviving sons, except for current Saudi monarch Salman, are as follows:

1. Abdul llah bin Abdulaziz (born 1939) – Former governor of Al Jawf Province. He was special advisor to King Abdullah from 2008 to 2015.
2. Ahmed bin Abdulaziz (born 1942) – Deputy minister of interior from 1975 to 2012; minister of interior from June 2012 to 5 November 2012.
3. Mashhur bin Abdulaziz (born 1942) – Father-in-law of Crown Prince Mohammed bin Salman
4. Muqrin bin Abdulaziz Al Saud (born 1945) – Director general of the General Intelligence Directorate from 2005 to 2012; former governor of Ha'il and Madinah provinces. He was appointed second deputy prime minister on 1 February 2013 and he was made crown prince on 23 January 2015 when his half-brother Salman became king. On 28 April 2015 Muqrin was granted resignation based on his request to start the next generation of the royals.

== Genealogy ==
Family tree of Saudi monarchs

Saud bin Muhammad Al Muqrin; 1640–1726
Thunayyan	Muhammad; 1687–1765; Emir of Diriyah r. 1744–1765	Farhan	Mishari
Ibrahim	Abdulaziz; 1720–1803; Emir of Diriyah r. 1765–1803	Abdullah; 1725–1812
Thunayyan	Saud; 1748–1814; Emir of Diriyah r. 1803–1814	Turki; 1755–1834; Emir of Nejd r. 1819–1820, r. 1823–1834
Abdullah d. 1843; Emir of Nejd r. 1841–1843	Abdullah d. 1819; Emir of Diriyah r. 1814–1818	Mishari; 1786–1834; Emir of Nejd r. 1834	Khalid; 1811–1865; Emir of Nejd r. 1838–1841	Faisal; 1785–1865; Emir of Nejd r. 1834–1838, r. 1843–1865	Juluwi
Abdullah; 1831–1889; Emir of Nejd r. 1865–1871, r. 1871–1873, r. 1876–1889	Saud; 1833–1875; Emir of Nejd r. 1871, r. 1873–1875	Abdul Rahman; 1850–1928; Emir of Nejd r. 1875–1876, r. 1889–1891
Abdulaziz (Ibn Saud); 1875–1953; Emir of Nejd r. 1902–1932; King of Saudi Arabia r. 1932–1953
Saud; 1902–1969; King of Saudi Arabia r. 1953–1964	Faisal; 1906–1975; King of Saudi Arabia r. 1964–1975	Khalid; 1913–1982; King of Saudi Arabia r. 1975–1982	Fahd; 1920, 1921, or 1923–2005; King of Saudi Arabia r. 1982–2005	Abdullah; 1924–2015; King of Saudi Arabia r. 2005–2015	Salman b. 1935; King of Saudi Arabia r. 2015–present
Mohammed bin Salman b. 1985; Crown Prince of Saudi Arabia

== Royal Standard ==
Royal Flag of the King

- The Royal Flag consists of a green flag, with an Arabic inscription and a sword featured in white, and with the national emblem embroidered in gold in the lower right canton.

The script on the flag is written in the Thuluth script. It is the shahada or Islamic declaration of faith:

لَا إِلٰهَ إِلَّا الله مُحَمَّدٌ رَسُولُ الله
lā ʾilāha ʾillā-allāh, muhammadun rasūlu-allāh
There is no other god but Allah, Muhammad is the messenger of God.

- The Royal Standard consists of a green flag, in the center of the national emblem embroidered with gold.

== See also ==
- Al ash-Sheikh
- Bani Hareth
- Bani Yas
- Banu Thaqif
- Banu Yam
- Bedouin
- Death of a Princess
- King of Saudi Arabia
- Saudi Royal Guard Regiment
