= Diriyah =

Town in Saudi Arabia, capital of the first Saudi state and Emirate of Diriyah

- Wordmark

- Location of Diriyah Governorate in Riyadh Province

- Location in Saudi Arabia
- Coordinates: 24°44′00″N 46°34′32″E
- Country: Saudi Arabia
- Province: Riyadh Province
- Website: Official Website

Diriyah (Arabic: الدِرْعِيّة, romanized: ad-Dir‘īyah, lit. 'place of armor'; formerly romanized as Dereyeh and Dariyya) is a town and governorate in Saudi Arabia. Located on the northwestern outskirts of the Saudi capital, Riyadh, Diriyah was the original home of the House of Saud, and served as the capital of the Emirate of Diriyah under the first Saudi dynasty from 1727 to 1818. Today, the town is the seat of the Diriyah Governorate, which also includes the villages of Uyayna, Jubayla, and Al-Ammariyyah, among others—and is part of Riyadh Province.

At-Turaif District, the first capital of Saudis in Diriyah, was declared a UNESCO World Heritage Site in 2010. The layout of the city itself can be studied in the National Museum of Saudi Arabia with the help of a large-scale detailed model of the city on display there. Diriyah also hosted the Diriyah ePrix race for the Formula E championship from 2018–2024.

== Location ==
The ruins of the old city of Diriyah lay on either side of the narrow valley known as Wadi Hanifa, which continues southwards through Riyadh and beyond. Consisting almost entirely of mud-brick structures, the ruins are divided into three districts, Ghussaibah, Al-Mulaybeed, and Turaif, which are set on top of hills overlooking the valley. Of the three, Turaif is the highest, and its bottom is easily accessible to tourists by foot. Part of the city wall, running along the edges of the wadi and also made of mud bricks, is still extant along with some high observation towers.

The modern city is built at a lower altitude at the foot of the hill upon which Turaif is located. To the north of the town, inside the valley, are a number of gardens, palm groves, and small farms and estates. A dam known as Al-Ilb lies further north.

== History ==
=== During Muhammad's era ===
In Muhammad's time the expedition of Muhammad ibn Maslamah took place here in Muharram, July 627 AD/6AH.

A platoon of thirty Muslims under the leadership of Muhammad bin Maslamah was despatched on a military mission. It headed for the habitation of the Qurata, a sept of the Bakr clan of the Banu Kilab. The platoon attacked that sept and dispersed them in all directions. The Muslims captured war bounty and returned with the chief of the tribe of Banu Hanifa, called Thumamah Bin Uthal al-Hanafi.

=== Post 1400 ===
Although the location is sometimes identified with an ancient settlement mentioned by Yaqut and Al-Hamadani known as "Ghabra", the history of Diriyah proper dates back to the 15th century. According to the chroniclers of Nejd, the city was founded in 1446–47 by Mani' Al-Muraydi (مانع المريدي), an ancestor of the Saudi royal family. Mani and his clan had come from the area of Al-Qatif in eastern Arabia, upon the invitation of Ibn Dir' (ابن درع), who was then the ruler of a group of settlements that now make up Riyadh. Ibn Dir' is said to have been a relative of Mani' Al-Mraydi, and Mani's clan is believed to have left the area of Wadi Hanifa at some unknown date and were merely returning to their country of origin.

Initially, Mani' and his clan, known as the Mrudah, settled in Ghusaybah (الغصيبة) and Al-Mulaybeed (المليبيد). The entire settlement was named Al-Dir'iyah, after Mani's benefactor Ibn Dir'. Later on, the district of Turaif (طُريف) was settled. Many families from other towns or from the Bedouin tribes of the nearby desert eventually settled in the area and by the 18th century Diriyah had become a well-known town in Nejd.

At that time, Muhammad ibn Saud emerged from a struggle within the ruling family of Al-Diriyah, the Al Miqrin (مقرن, sons of Miqrin, a descendant of Mani'), and became the emir, or ruler, of Al-Diriyah. In 1744, Ibn Saud took in a religious scholar named Muhammad ibn Abd al-Wahhab, who hailed from the town of Al-Uyaynah, lying on the same wadi some 30 miles upstream. Ibn Saud agreed to implement al-Wahhabi religious views, and what later became known as the First Saudi State, with its capital at Diriyah, was born. Within the next several decades, Ibn Saud and his immediate descendants managed to subjugate all of Nejd, as well as the eastern and western regions of Arabia, and sent raids into Iraq. Diriyah quickly swelled in size and increased in wealth, becoming the largest town in Nejd and a major city in Arabia by the standards of the time. However, the Saudis' conquest of the holy cities of Mecca and Medina drew the ire of the Ottoman Empire, the major Islamic power at the time, which led to the Ottoman-Saudi War of 1811–1818 and an invasion of Arabia by the Ottoman Empire and Egyptian forces. They brought the Saudi state to an end in 1818, with Diriyah capitulating after a nearly-year-long siege. The leader of the invading force, Ibrahim Pasha, ordered the destruction of Diriyah. However, when a member of the local nobility tried to revive the Wahhabi state in Diriyah, Ibrahim ordered his troops to destroy the town even further and set whatever was left of it on fire. When the Saudis revived their fortunes in 1824 and again in 1902, they made their capital further south in Riyadh, which has remained their capital ever since.

The Ottoman Empire viewed the Arab challenge with caution, especially after the loss of Mecca and Medina, and the removal of the Ottoman emperor's name from Friday prayers. An Egyptian army under Ibrahim Pasha was sent to recover lost territory. In 1818 the army entered Diriyah and after a six-month siege penetrated the defences on the Turaif, totally destroyed the houses and cut down every tree in the palm groves. The Egyptians were estimated to have lost 10,000 men in the siege, and the Saudi forces 1,800.

The town's original inhabitants left Diriyah after 1818, with the bulk of them moving to Riyadh. In The Kingdom (first published in 1981), British author Robert Lacey observed that the Al Saud had "left the shell of their old capital behind them, an enduring reminder of the frontiers of the possible" and compared the old Diriyah to "a sand-blown Pompeii". However, the area was resettled in the late 20th century, mostly by former nomads (Bedouin), and a new city was founded by the Saudi government in the late 1970s. This new city of Diriyah grew in size and is now a small but modern town and the seat of its own governorate. The ruins remain a tourist attraction and are subject to a slow restoration project on the part of the Saudi government.

== Renovations and development plans ==
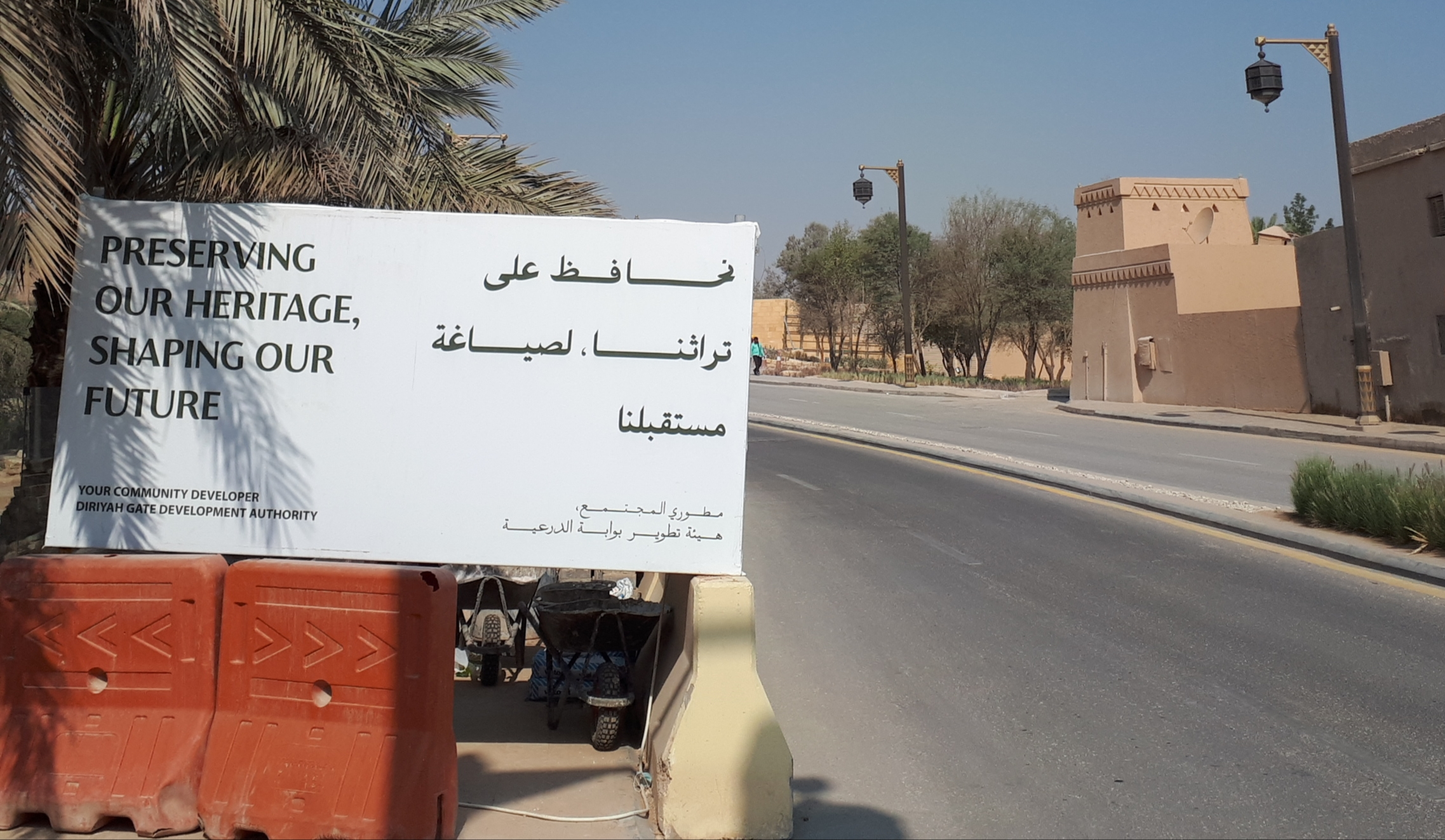
Heritage preserving: Diriyah Gate Development Authority

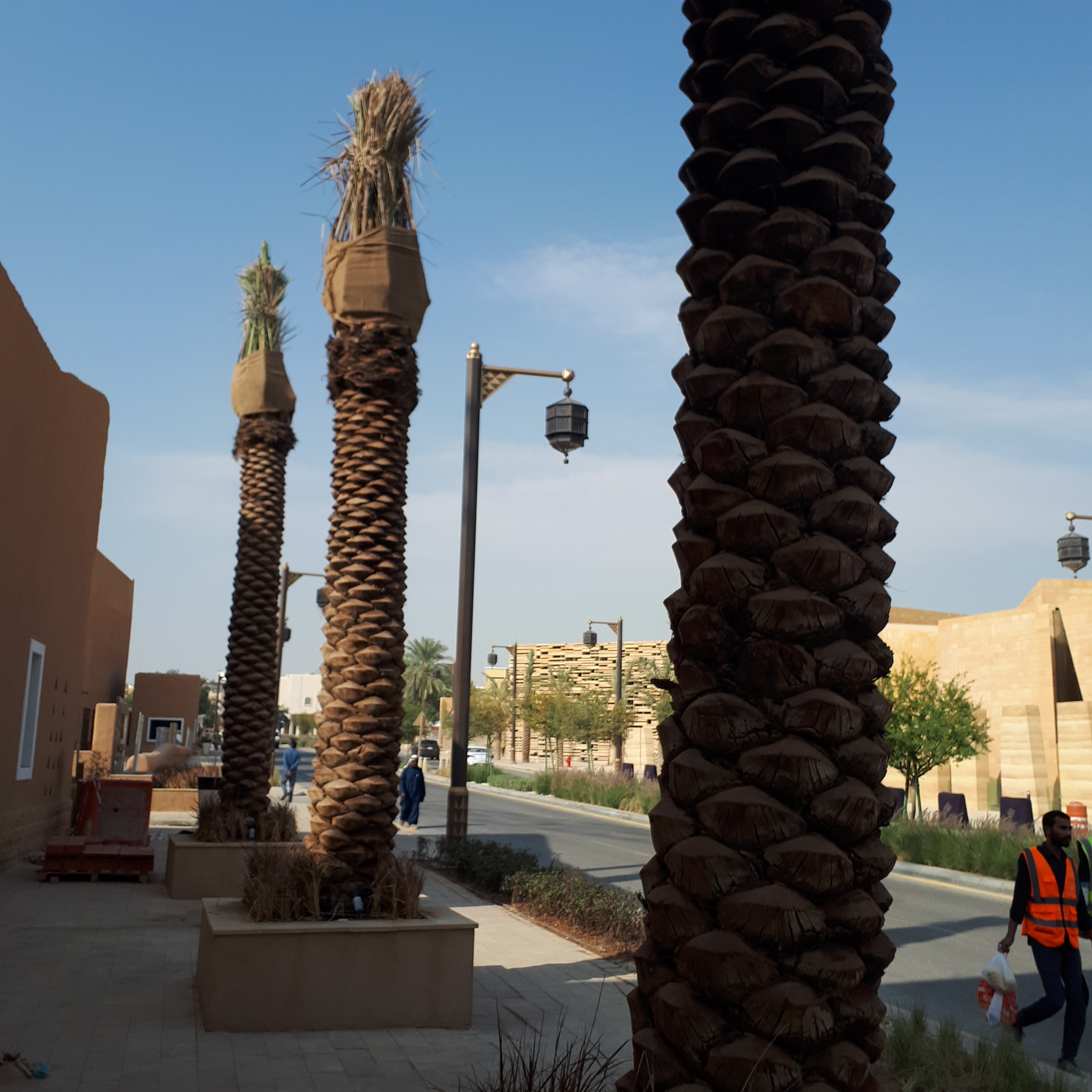
Street in Diriyah open air museum

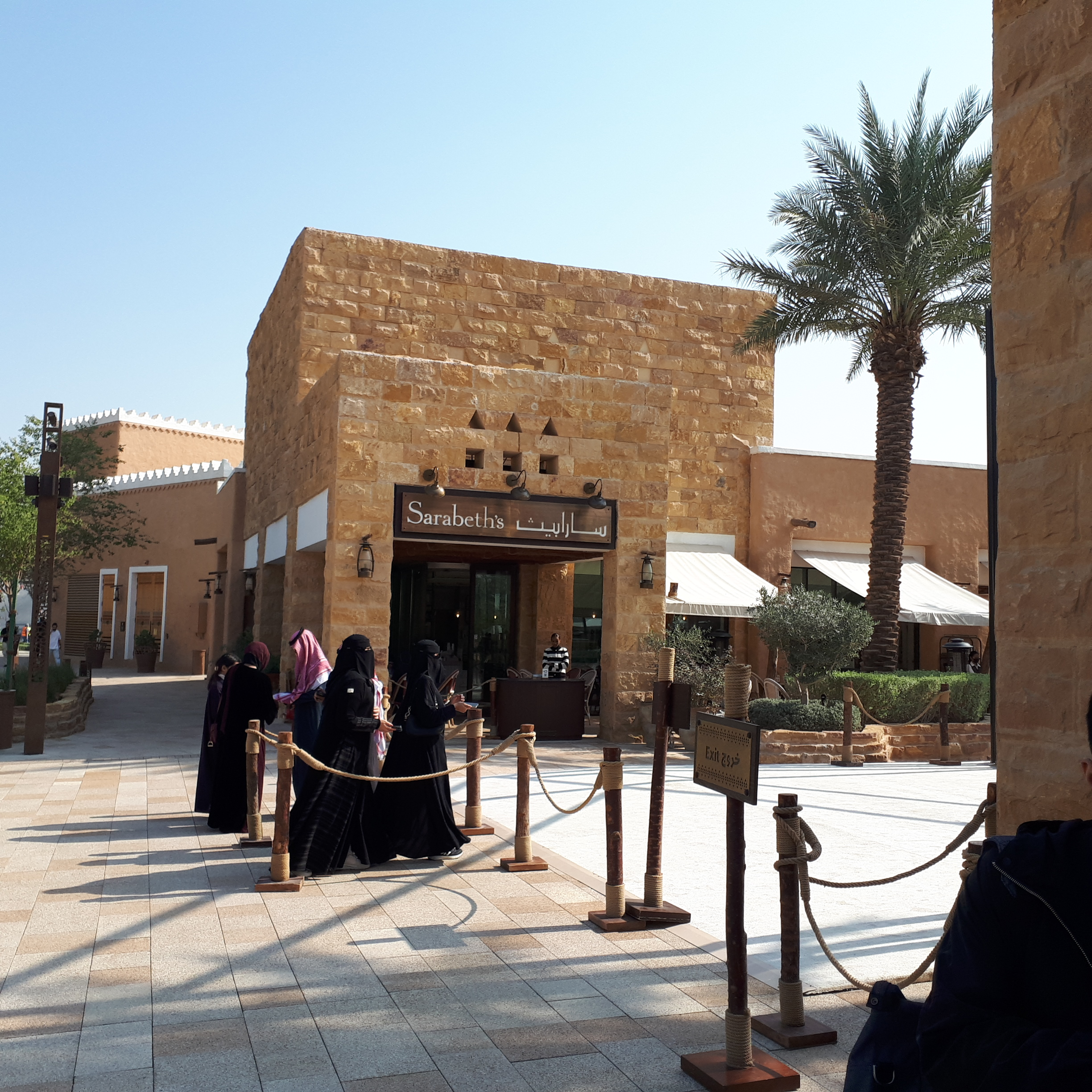
Entrance gate to open air museum, January 2024

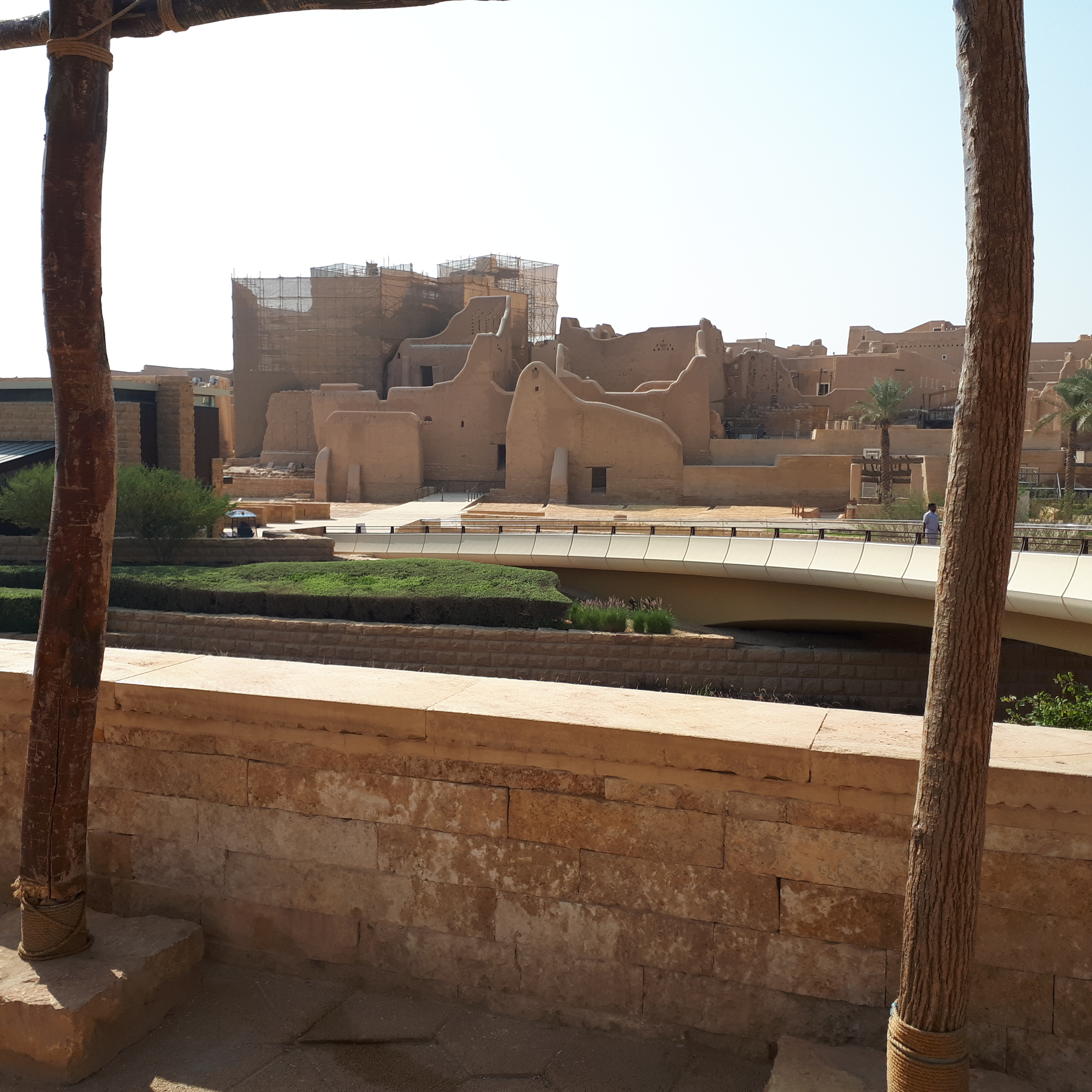
View towards reconstructed old Diriyah

Saudi Arabia has formed the Diriyah Gate Development Authority (DGDA) to oversee the preservation and development of the historic site. Despite Wahhabi destruction of many Islamic, cultural, and historical sites associated with the early history of Islam and the first generation of Muslims (Muhammad's family and his companions), the Saudi government undertook a large scale renovation of Muhammad ibn Abd al-Wahhab's domain, turning it into a major tourist attraction. In 2018, Jerry Inzerillo, previously the CEO of Forbes Travel Guide, was hired to lead the new authority. In 2019, Inzerillo said that Diriyah would soon be known as "the Beverly Hills of Riyadh."

Among the rebuilt structures are the bath and guest house, the Qasr Nasr, the Saad bin Saud Palace that was finished by the early 1990s, the Burj Faysal that was a wall tower renovated in the 1980s, major sections of the wall surrounding Turaif, and sections of the outer walls and some watchtowers surrounding the wadi. Outside of the Turaif district, on the opposite side of the wadi Hanifa, the region of the mosque of Muhammad ibn Abd al-Wahhab has been completely remodeled, leaving only some of the more recent original structures standing to the north of the complex build on the site of the historic mosque.

The "Turaif District Development Plan" aims to turn the district into a major national, cultural and touristic center. Before turning the complete site into a modern open-air museum documentation and necessary investigations, including excavations especially in places that may need to be remodelled, are planned in three major phases. These will include sites such as:

- Al-Imam Mohammad bin Saud Mosque and Salwa Palace.
- Ibraheem Ibn Saud Palace and Fahad Ibn Saud Palace.
- Farhan Ibn Saud Palace, Torki Ibn Saud Palace, and Qoo'a Al-Sharia'a (eastern court of Salwa Palace).

Once finished, there will be a new visitors center as well as a documentation center. Four new museums are planned for the district.

- A museum of war and defense (as this was the site of a major siege in Saudi Arabia).
- A museum of horses.
- A museum of social life.
- A museum of commerce and finance.

Additionally, a Turaif traditional market will add to the open-air museum experience.

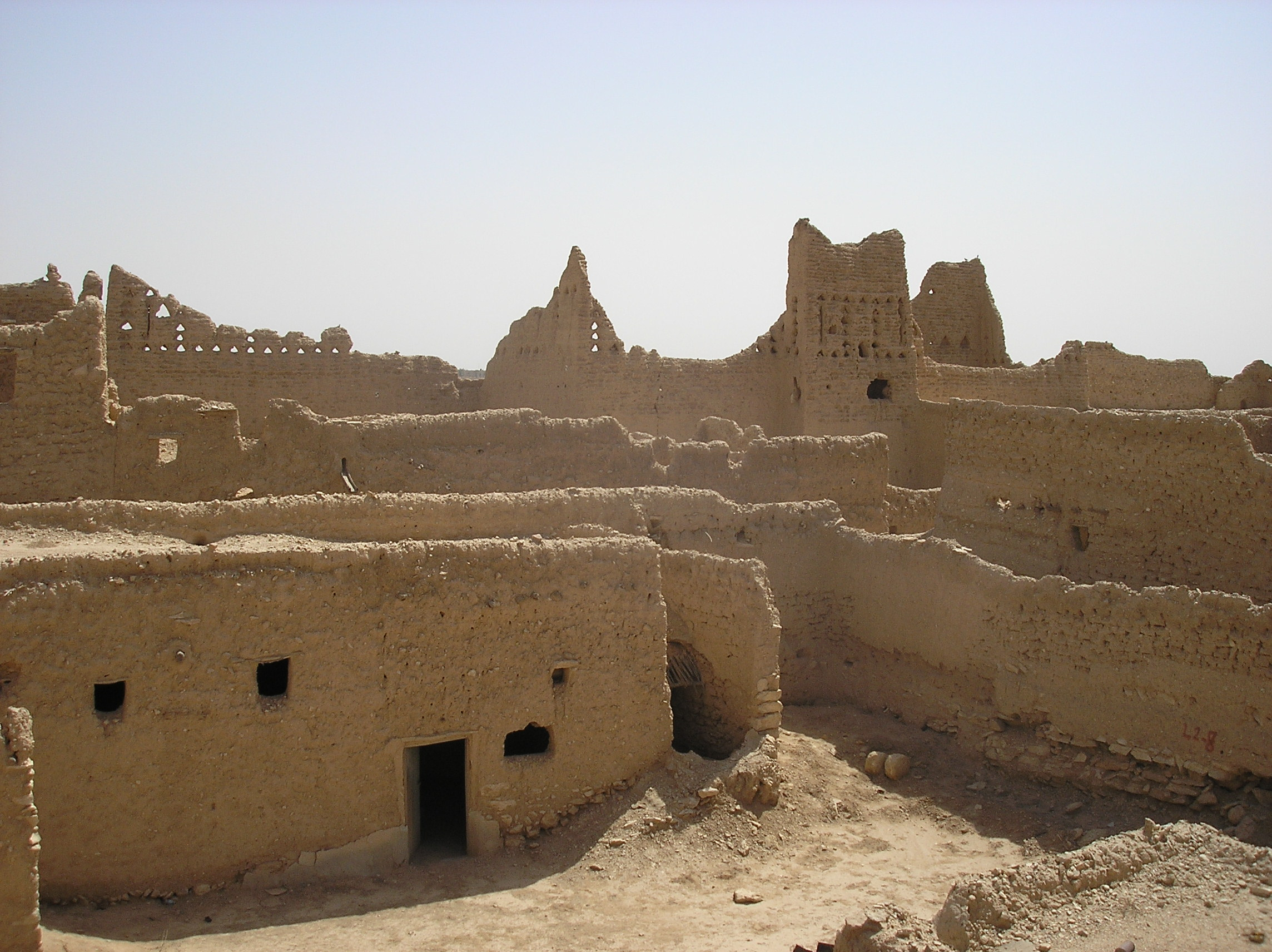
Old ruins in Diriyah

The Saudi government undertook a large scale renovation of Muhammad ibn Abd al-Wahhab's domain, turning it into a major tourist attraction.

== Main historic sites ==
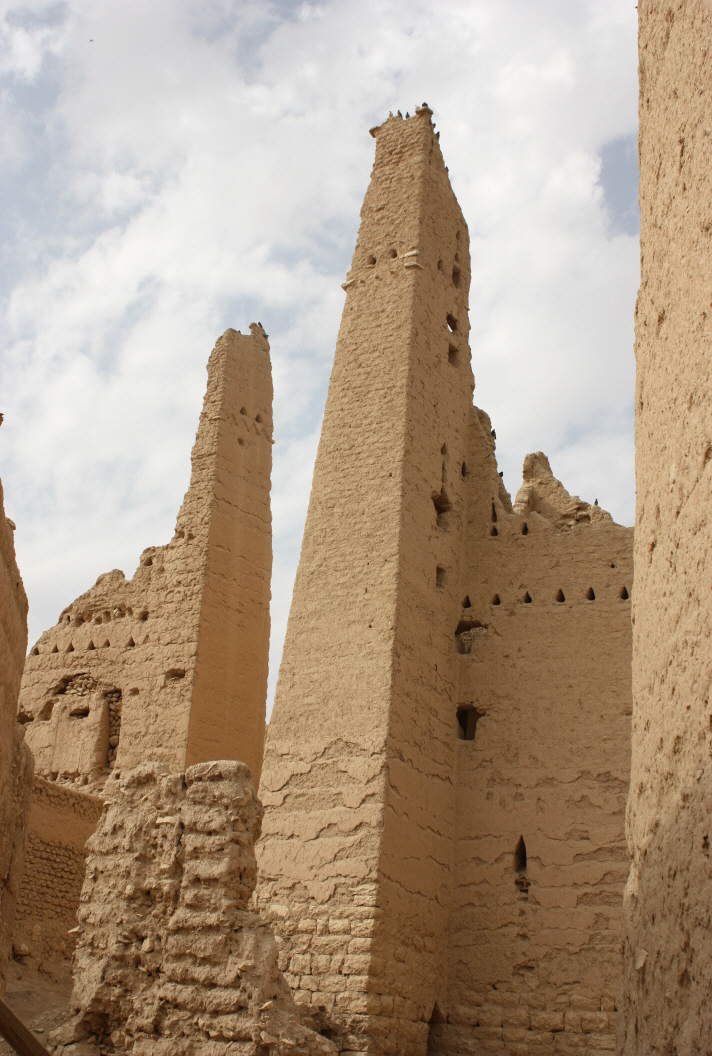
Al-Dirʻiyyah, remains of the central building in Qasr Salwa

The old city's historic structures include:

- Salwa Palace (قصر سلوى) was the residence and first home of the Saʿūdī Amirs and Imāms during the First Saudi State. It is considered the largest palace on the site, rising four stories high. It is composed of five main parts built at different consecutive periods of time. It was probably finished by Saud ibn Abdul Aziz ibn Muhammad ibn Saud, who was Imam from 1803 to 1814. It is now a museum.

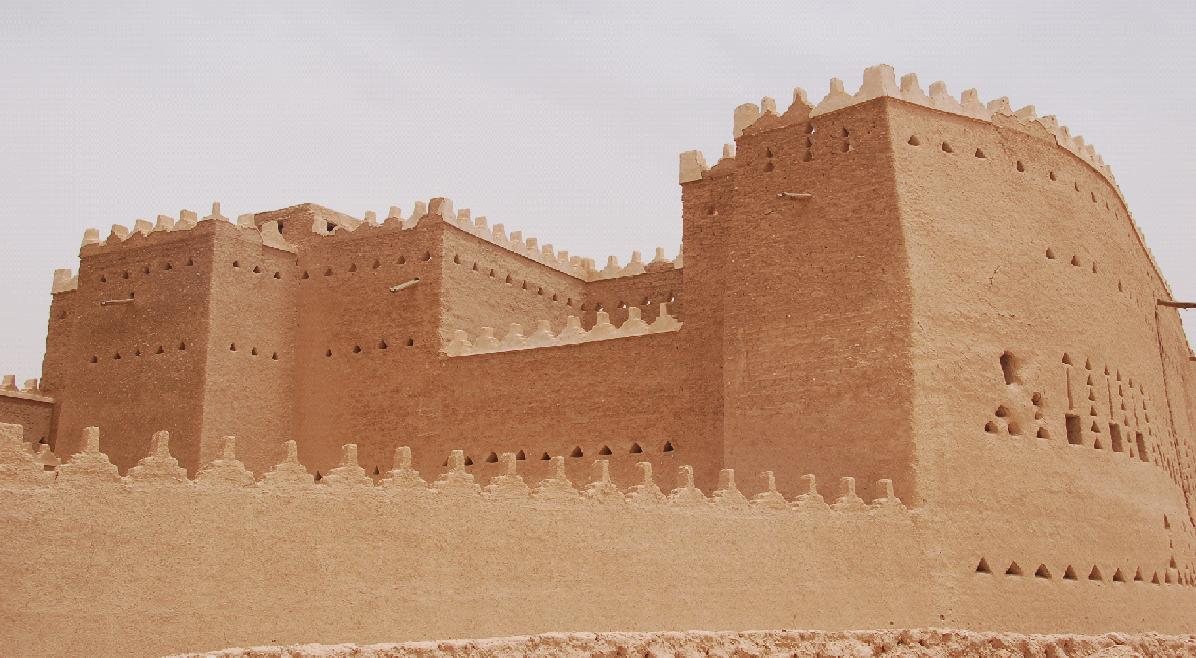
Sa'ad ibn Saud Palace

- Sa'ad bin Saʿūd Palace popularly known as the Palace of Saad (قصر سعد بن سعود). One of the largest palaces on the site, it is famous for its courtyard, which was used as a stable. The palace was restored in the late 1980s and is several stories high. Sa'd ibn Sā'ud was the son of Imām Abd Allāh bin Saʿūd āl Sāʿūd (d. 1819) and played a prominent role in the battle for the city in 1818.

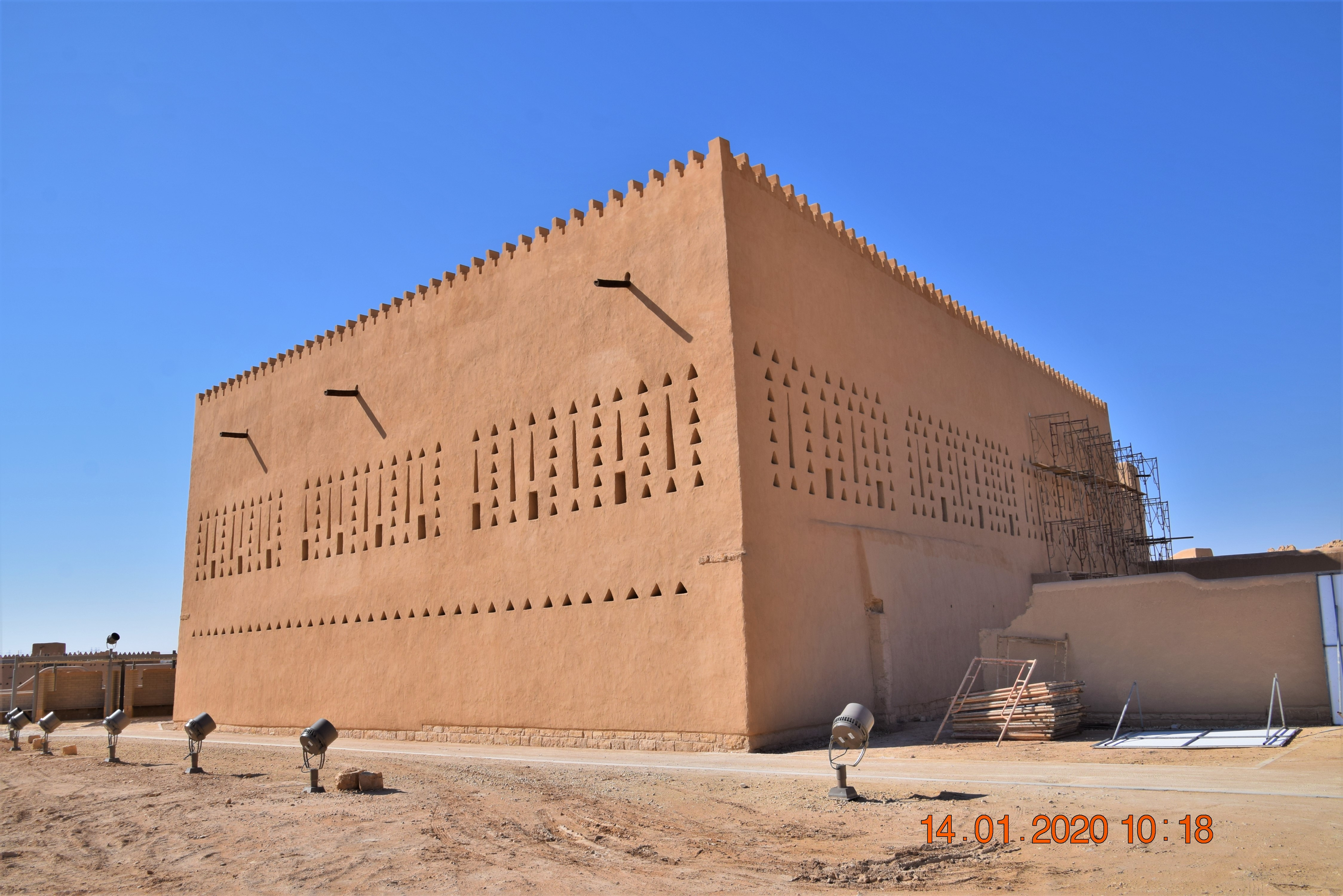
Al-Dirʻiyyah. The palace of Sa'd ibn Sā'ud (قصر سعد الدرعية) as restored.

- The Guest House and At-Turaif Bath House a traditional building consisting of a number of small courtyards surrounded by rooms. The Bath House is famous for its different architectural styles and shows how the building was waterproofed by using different plasters. Both the Guest and Bath Houses were supplied with water from a well in the wadi.
- Imām Muḥammad bin Saʿūd Mosque, a mosque built first during the reign of Imām Mohammad bin Saud (1687–1765), perhaps replacing an earlier structure. Imām Abd al ʿAzīz bin Muḥammad Āl Saʿūd was assassinated here while leading Asr Salat in November 1803. The building fell into ruins after the invasion of 1818 and the disappearance of the first Saudi state; only part of the structure on eastern side survived to the 1970s and is still preserved. A small mosque was built on the south-west corner of the site some time in the first half of 20th century. Subsequently the location was excavated to reveal the large hypostyle mosque of the 18th century. The modern mosque was replaced with a traditional building as part of the development under the UNESCO heritage programme.
- Al-Bujairi (البجيري), one of the districts of the city, directly adjacent to Qasr Salwa on the opposite side of the wadi. It was the religious centre of the historical settlement, surrounded by palm trees. The chief building was mosque of the Shaykh Muḥammad bin ʿAbd al-Wahāb (محمد بن عبد الوهاب), now rebuilt and set in the al-Bujairi Heritage Park. Shaykh Mohammad ibn Abdulwahab used to give lessons about his reformed movement of Islam in this mosque. It became a centre for religious education. Students used to travel to it from all parts of the Arabian Peninsula.
- Ghasiba (غصيبة), a walled historic site and on the edge of Wadi Hanifah, is to the north of old Dir'iyyah and is thought to date back to the 17th century CE.

== Other notable buildings ==
- Qasr al-'Ujā (قصر العوجا) is a large Saudi royal palace erected adjacent to the old city on the south bank of Wadi Hanifa.
- The mosque of al-Zawiharah (مسجد الظويهرة) is located in the al-Bujairi Heritage Park and is an old traditional building, restored and reopened in 2014. It is notable for the underground chamber or khālwa, a feature encountered in the older mosques in the Najd region.
- The mosque of al-Sarikhah (مسجد السريحة) is a modern building made in the traditional central Arabian style. It is located on the west side of the al-Bujairi Heritage Park.
- The mosque of Nakhil al-'Dhibah (مسجد نخيل العذيبة) is located a short distance to the west of the old city, in the farm of Sultan Bin Salman. It is built in the traditional central Arabian style.

== Museums ==
A number of the palaces in the old city have been restored and are used as museums.

- Museum of Bygone Days (متحف السنين الماضية) is located north of al-Bujairi and houses a collection reflecting everyday life in central Arabia in the early and middle twentieth century.

== Public facilities and centres ==
- Al-Maarefa University (جامعة المعرفة), is an educational institution to the north of the old city in Al Khalidiyah suburb of Riyadh.

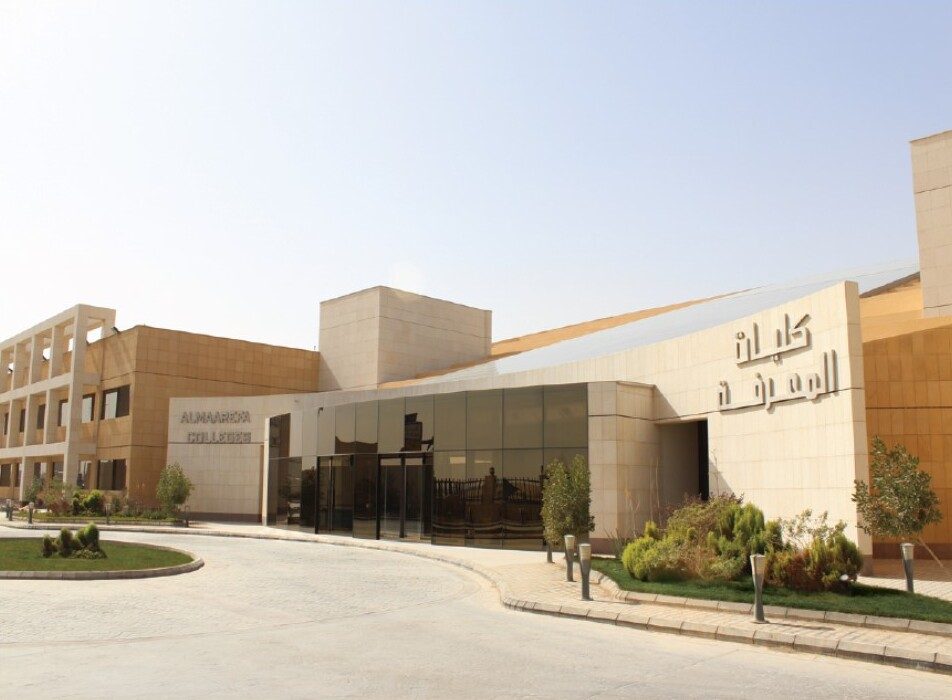
Al-Dirʻiyyah, Al Maarefa University

- Mosim Park, Football ground in the Nakheel area. It is home to football team Mosim FC, who are called The Pride of Dir'iyah. Mosim Park was erected in 2007 after Mosim FC moved there from their old ground downtown of Riyadh.
- Bujairi Terrace, a 15,000 sq meter upscale dining and shopping area requiring tickets booked in advance for entry (tickets are free before 5pm). It is home to over 20 renowned international and local restaurants, including Michelin-starred options, provides direct views of At-Turaif District, as well as a complimentary carousel. The buildings are styled in traditional Najdi architecture.
- Diriyah Arena opened in 2019 is a sporting venue with a capacity of 15,000 seats.

== Climate ==
In Diriyah, the summers are long, sweltering, and arid, and the winters are cool and dry. Diriyah has a hot desert climate (Köppen climate classification BWh).

Climate data for Diriyah
Month	Jan	Feb	Mar	Apr	May	Jun	Jul	Aug	Sep	Oct	Nov	Dec	Year
Mean daily maximum °C (°F)	19.9 (67.8)	22.9 (73.2)	27.8 (82.0)	32.1 (89.8)	38.3 (100.9)	41.4 (106.5)	42.4 (108.3)	41.9 (107.4)	39.7 (103.5)	34.2 (93.6)	26.9 (80.4)	21.6 (70.9)	32.4 (90.4)
Mean daily minimum °C (°F)	9.9 (49.8)	7.9 (46.2)	13.9 (57.0)	18.2 (64.8)	23.3 (73.9)	25.3 (77.5)	26.6 (79.9)	22.7 (72.9)	23.2 (73.8)	18.2 (64.8)	13.5 (56.3)	9.0 (48.2)	17.6 (63.8)
Average precipitation mm (inches)	17 (0.7)	7 (0.3)	31 (1.2)	31 (1.2)	11 (0.4)	0 (0)	0 (0)	0 (0)	0 (0)	2 (0.1)	8 (0.3)	13 (0.5)	120 (4.7)
Source: Climate-data.org

== Gallery ==
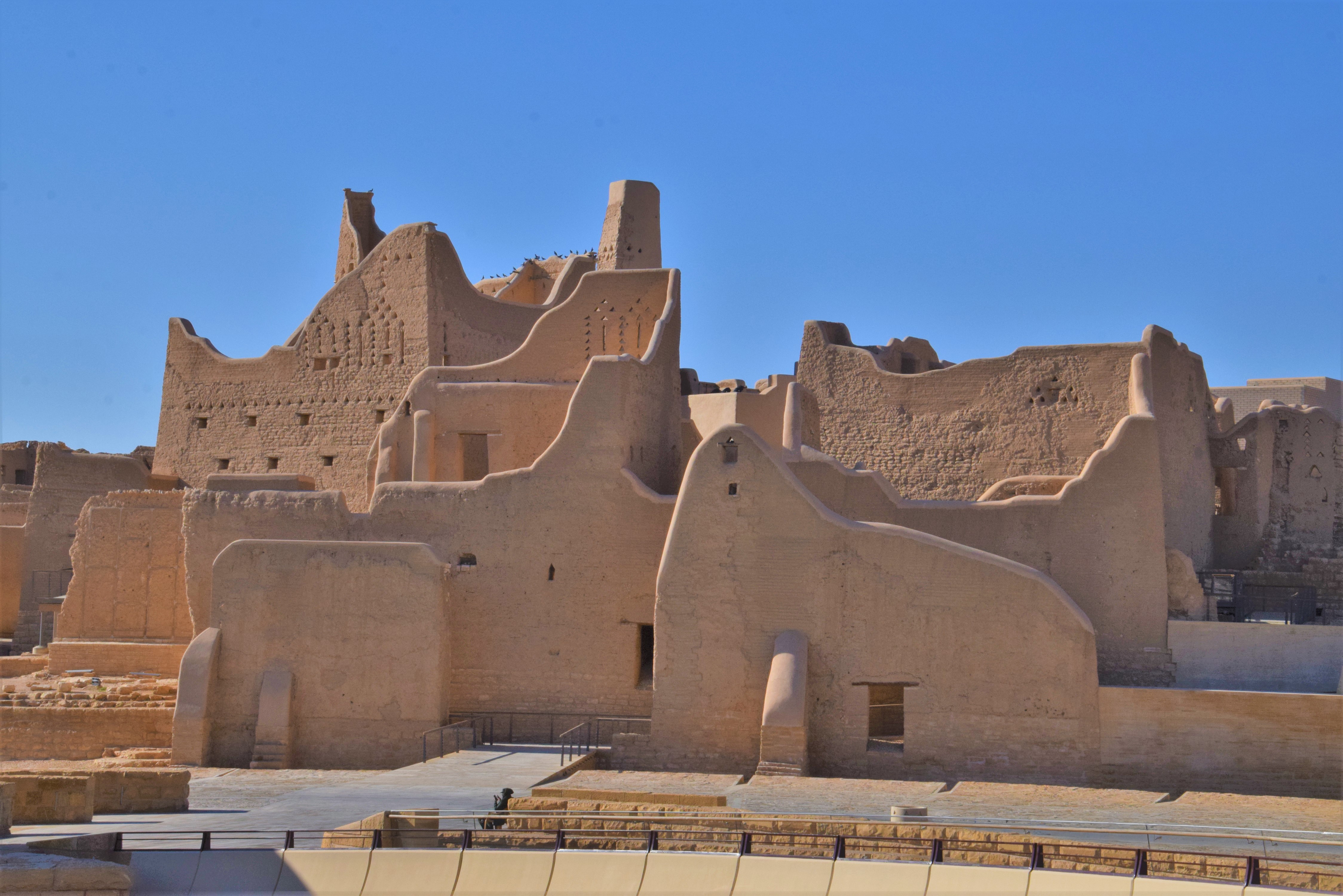
Salwa Palace from the outside

== See also ==
- Siege of Diriyah
- Diriyah ePrix
- List of battles of Muhammad
- List of cities and towns in Saudi Arabia
