= First Saudi state =

1727–1818 state ruled by the House of Saud

Coordinates: 24°44′N 46°34′E

Emirate of Diriyah إِمَارَةُ الدِّرْعِيَّةِ (Arabic)
- 1744–1818
- Flag

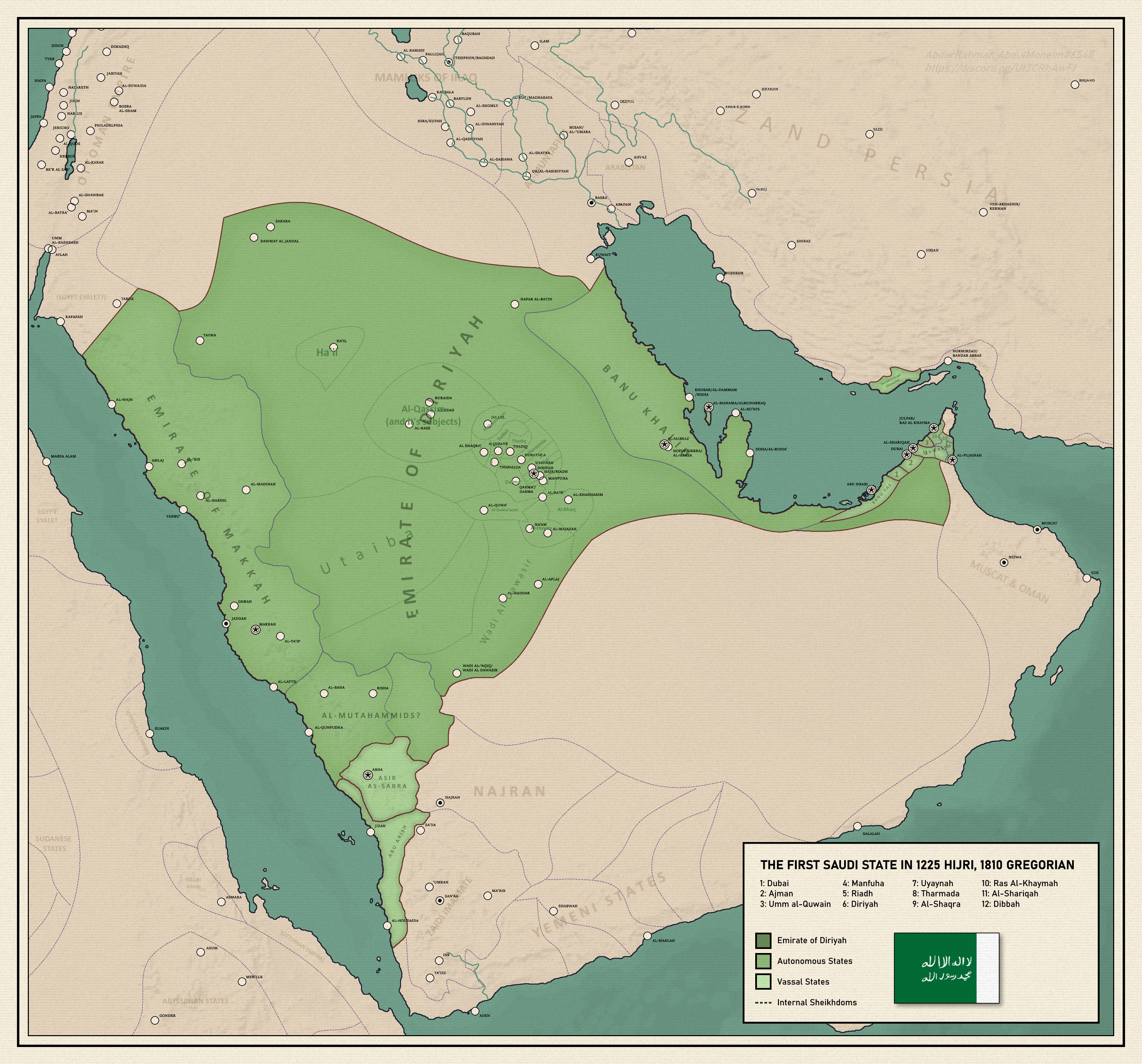
- Map of the first Saudi state in 1810. Legend: First Saudi state (mainland) Autonomous regions Vassal states
- Status: Emirate
- Capital: Diriyah
- Common languages: Arabic
- Religion: Sunni Islam
- Government: Monarchy
- Emir
  - 1744–1765: Muhammad bin Saud
  - 1765–1803: Abdulaziz bin Muhammad
  - 1803–1814: Saud bin Abdulaziz
  - 1814–1818: Abdullah bin Saud
- History
  - Diriyah established: 1744
  - Diriyah pact: 1744
  - Siege of Diriyah: 1818
- Currency: Diriyah Riyal
Preceded by
Sheikhdom of Diriyah
Hejaz Eyalet
Bani Khalid Emirate
Omani Empire
Qasimid State
Principality of Abu 'Arish
Succeeded by
Ottoman Egypt
Mu'ammarid Imamate
- Today part of: Saudi Arabia; Qatar; Kuwait; UAE; Bahrain

The first Saudi state (Arabic: الدَّوْلَةُ السُّعُودِيَّةُ الْأُولَىٰ, romanized: ad-dawla as-suʿūdiyya al-ʾūlā), officially the Emirate of Diriyah (Arabic: إمارة الدرعية, romanized: ʾimāra ad-dirʿiyya), was a polity that existed on the Arabian Peninsula between 1744 and 1818. The emir of a Najdi town called Diriyah, Muhammad bin Saud Al Muqrin, and the religious leader Muhammad ibn Abd al-Wahhab signed a pact founding a socio-religious reform movement that propagated the Wahhabi religious doctrine under the political leadership of the House of Saud.

They then proceeded to expand their state throughout the Arabian Peninsula, the Levant, the coast of the Iranian city of Bandar Abbas, and the Bab al-Mandab Strait. The first Saudi state ended in 1818 after forces from the Eyalet of Egypt, acting on orders of Ottoman Sultan Mahmud II captured and destroyed the capital city of Diriyah following a siege that lasted for several months.

== History ==
=== Early establishment ===
The House of Saud and its allies quickly rose to become the dominant power in Arabia by first conquering Najd, and then expanding their influence over the eastern coast from Kuwait down to the northern borders of Oman. Saud's forces also captured the highlands of Asir, while Muhammad ibn Abd al-Wahhab wrote letters to people and scholars to join the jihad. After many military campaigns, Muhammad bin Saud died in 1765, leaving the leadership to his son, Abdul-Aziz bin Muhammad, whose forces captured the Shia holy city of Karbala, in Ottoman Iraq, in 1801. Here they destroyed the shrine of the saints and monuments and killed over 5,000 civilians. In retribution, Abdulaziz was assassinated by a young Shia in 1803, having followed him back to Najd.

Muhammad bin Abd al-Wahhab died in 1792. In 1803, eleven years after his death, the son of Abdulaziz bin Muhammad, Saud bin Abdulaziz, sent out forces to bring the region of Hejaz under his rule. Taif was the first city to be captured, and later the two holy cities of Mecca and Medina followed. This was seen as a major challenge to the authority of the Ottoman Empire, which had exercised its rule over the holy cities since 1517.

=== Decline of sovereignty ===
The task of weakening the grip of the House of Saud was given to the powerful viceroy of Egypt, Muhammad Ali Pasha, by the Ottomans. This initiated the Ottoman–Saudi War, in which Muhammad Ali sent his troops to the Hejaz region by sea. His son, Ibrahim Pasha, then led Ottoman forces into the heart of Najd, capturing town after town. Saud's successor, his son Abdullah I, was unable to prevent the recapture of the region. Finally, Ibrahim reached the Saudi capital at Diriyah. He placed it under siege for several months until it surrendered in the winter of 1818. Ibrahim then shipped off many members of the House of Saud to Egypt and the Ottoman capital of Constantinople (modern-day Istanbul). Abdullah I was later executed in the Ottoman capital, with his severed head thrown into the waters of the Bosporus, marking the end of what became known as the first Saudi state. However, both the followers of the Wahhabi movement and the remaining members of the House of Saud stayed committed. In 1824 they founded a second Saudi state which lasted until 1891. Before the unification of modern Saudi Arabia, several emirates and kingdoms were established in the region, eventually paving the way for the formation of the Kingdom of Saudi Arabia.

== Legacy ==
In 2022, the Saudi government designated 1727, the year Muhammad I assumed leadership of the Sheikhdom of Diriyah, as the official beginning of the first Saudi state. They also designated February 22 as Saudi Founding Day, an annual holiday to celebrate the nation's founding.

== See also ==
- History of Saudi Arabia
- Unification of Saudi Arabia
- Sheikhdom of Diriyah
- Second Saudi state
- Third Saudi state
