= Battle of Al-Safra =

1812 battle in the Ottoman–Saudi war

Coordinates: 24°28′N 39°36′E

- Part of the Ottoman–Wahhabi War
| Date | December 1811 |
| Location | Wadi Al-Safra, near Medina |
| Result | Wahhabi victory |

Belligerents
| Ottoman Empire; Eyalet of Egypt | Emirate of Diriyah |

Commanders and leaders
| Muhammad Ali Pasha; Tusun Pasha; Thomas Keith | Saud bin Abdulaziz; Abdullah bin Saud; Mas'ud Bin Madhian; Faisal bin Mas'ud; Habab Bin Qahisan |

Strength
| 8,000–14,000 men | 18,000 men 800 cavalry |

Casualties and losses
| 4,500–5,000 killed 7 cannons captured | 600 killed |

The Battle of Al-Safra in late 1811, was an early major battle in the First Campaign of the Ottoman–Wahhabi war. It occurred when Saud bin Abdulaziz's Wahhabi troops engaged Tusun Pasha's Ottoman force while it was travelling through a Wadi attempting to reach Medina. It was a resounding Ottoman defeat and they were forced to retreat.

== Prelude ==
In 1811, Ottoman forces led by Tusun Pasha, the son of Muhammad Ali Pasha, captured Yanbu from the Wahhabis. On their arrival, the Ottomans faced a garrison with only 300 men; whose leader fled, that subsequently surrendered. Ottoman forces then proceeded to Badr where they fought Saud's Wahhabis for two hours until they succeeded in capturing the city.

The Wahhabis fell back to Wadi Al-Safra near Medina. The Ottoman army would pass through it on the way to Medina. Eventually they sent a force of 8,000 or 14,000 men, possibly 8,000 professional soldiers and 14,000 with additional irregulars, When Saud bin Abdulaziz heard the Ottomans were invading, he recruited forces from Najd, Hejaz, and Tihamah. He was able to raise a larger army of 18,000 men and 800 cavalry and they marched to Wadi Al-Safra (also known as Al-Kheif) with his son Abdullah bin Saud Al Saud.

== Battle ==
When Saud bin Abdulaziz Al Saud's forces arrived at Wadi Al-Safra (Al-Kheif), Abdullah ordered Mas'ud Bin Madhian to a hill over the Wadi to prevent the Ottomans outflanking them from highground. Abdullah then sent a small force to engage the Ottomans, but it was unsuccessful and 32 were killed. Abdullah then gave command of the cavalry to his brother Faisal bin Mas'ud and Habab bin Qahisan. The main fighting then started, with both sides suffering losses. Some Bedouin forces recruited by Saud were defeated, but the rest held their places. The battle continued for three days. Abdullah ordered Mas'ud Bin Madhian and other Bedouins to charge the Ottomans, which broke their formation, killed many of them, and caused panic in their ranks.

The Ottomans retreated from the battle in an unorganized fashion after incurring 600 loses. However, they were chased by Saud's forces, who caused far greater casualties to them during their retreat. The final Ottoman loses were 4,000 or 5,000 killed; while Saud's forces lost only 600. They also captured seven Ottoman cannons along with large amounts of additional weaponry.
