= Wahhabi raids on Najaf =

1801–1806 campaigns in modern Iraq

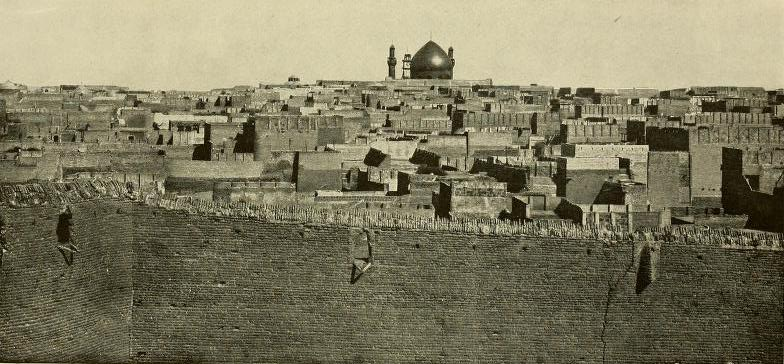
- The Ali Shrine in Najaf, 1914
Date	1802–1811
Location	Najaf and once Hillah 32°00′00″N 44°20′00″E
Result	Iraqi victory

Belligerents
Emirate of Diriyah	Religious authority of Najaf Qajar Iran

Commanders and leaders
Abdulaziz I X Abdullah (WIA); Saud I (AWOL)	Jafar Kashif al-Ghita; Jawad al-Husayni; Muzaffar al-Kaabi; Mutair bin Fadel; Khalaf bin Khudair; Janb Rashid

Strength
In 1802; 12,000–15,000 troops In 1803; 10,000–15,000 troops In 1806; Unknown	In 1802; ~200 troops In 1803; ~200 troops In 1806; ~200 troops

Casualties and losses
In 1802; 700 killed	In 1802; 15 killed

The Wahhabi raids on Najaf (Arabic: الغارات الوهابيه على النجف, romanized: al-Ghārāt al-Wahhābiyyah ʿalā al-Najaf) were a series of Wahhabi campaigns directed at the sacred Shia city of Najaf, aimed at expanding the Emirate of Diriyah and spreading the Wahhabi doctrine. The campaigns were hostile toward Shia Muslims, as well as aimed to destroy shrines they saw as a bid'ah. The Wahhabi campaigns on Najaf began in the early 19th century.

== Background ==
When the Ottoman Empire was weakening day by day, the Wahhabis were looting and expanding in the Arabian Peninsula. Among their expansions was into Iraq, where they sought to destroy the shrines of Shia Imams. One of their campaigns was the raids on Najaf, which took place between 1801 and 1806, during the leadership of the Wahhabi Imams Abdulaziz bin Muhammad and Saud bin Abdulaziz (son of Abdulaziz bin Saud). However, the most infamous attack on Iraq was the looting of Karbala, in which 2,000 to 5,000 people were killed at the hands of the Wahhabis.

Map of Najaf's location among the other governorates of Iraq

There are also accounts stating that there was a plague in Baghdad, and from this situation the Wahhabis, under Saud bin Abdulaziz, took advantage and launched their first campaign against Najaf sometime between 1800 and 1801. However, they clashed with the people of Basra, suffering an unknown number of casualties, before returning to Najd, their base in the Emirate of Diriyah.

== First siege (1802) ==
When the Wahhabi army attacked Karbala in 1802, Saud bin Abdulaziz began his next campaign towards Najaf, keeping the Imam Ali Shrine as a potential spot of assault in a similar manner as of the Wahhabi sack of Karbala. Contemporarily the Eid al-Ghadir (Note: A third festival among the Shia commemorating the appointment of Ali as caliph on the day of Ghadir Khumm.) festival was ongoing which further cautioned the inhabitants of Najaf, of a potential robbery and plunder of the Imam Ali Shrine.

With prior acknowledgement of the negligence and reluctance of the Ottoman state towards the shrines of the Imams, they moved the jewels and other treasures of Najaf from the Imam Ali Shrine to Baghdad to secure them from any potential assault and robbery. The Shia religious authority, Sheikh Jafar Kashif al-Ghita organized a mobilization in Najaf, where people armed themselves and fortified the city by blocking entrances with large rocks and stones.

According to sources, when the Wahhabi army reached Najaf, they besieged it with a force of 12,000 to 15,000 soldiers. Saud began firing on the city, killing 5 people that night. The Wahhabis remained outside the walls until the following night, after which they withdrew. In this battle, 10 people from Najaf were killed, along with 700 soldiers from the Wahhabi army.

== Second siege (1803) ==
Four years after the first attack, Sheikh Jafar Kashif al-Ghita, with the assistance of Grand Vizier Muhammad Husayn Khan, (Note: The vizier of Fath-Ali Shah) oversaw the construction of a wall, a deep trench, towers, watchtowers, and guard posts around Najaf. The fortifications included various openings in their upper levels for positioning cannons and rifles, transforming the city into a military zone that was difficult to penetrate.

A few months after this construction, Saud al-Kabir launched a campaign on Najaf with 10,000 to 15,000 Wahhabi soldiers. One reason for this campaign was his desire to avenge his father, who had been killed by a Shia man named Mulla ‘Uthman—reported by some sources to have been Afghan, others Kurdish, and others Iraqi from Karbala. However, the campaign ended in a major failure.

== Third siege (1806) ==
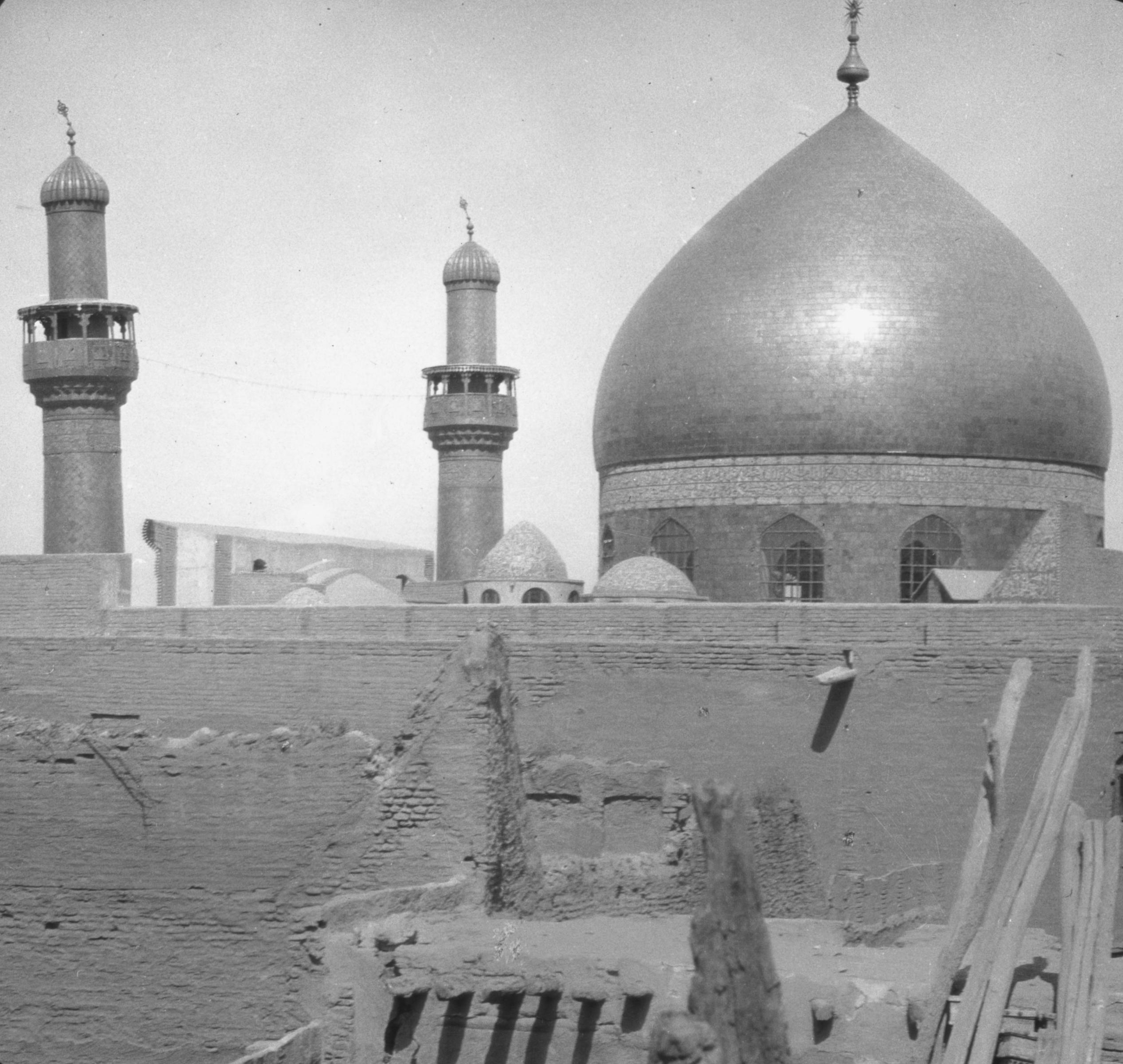
The dome of the shrine of Ali in 1932

Three years after the previous siege, the Wahhabis launched a new siege on Najaf with roughly the same number of troops as in the earlier campaigns. This time, the majority of the city's inhabitants fled, fearing a repeat of what had happened in Karbala. However, some remained—most notably the Shia religious authority of Najaf at the time, Sheikh Jafar Kashif al-Ghita’.

At that point, Najaf had only about 200 soldiers. Alongside Kashif al-Ghita’ was Sheikh Jawad al-Husayni, who was then writing the fifth volume of his book Miftah al-Karama. He recorded:

"This volume was completed at the beginning of the month of Rabi‘ al-Awwal, 1221 AH, amid unsettled conditions and preoccupation of mind due to what befell us from the accursed outsider in the land of Najd. He invented what he invented in religion, permitted the blood of Muslims, and destroyed the shrines of the infallible Imams… In the year 1221 AH, on the ninth night of the month of Safar, an hour before dawn, he attacked us in Najaf al-Ashraf while we were unprepared—so much so that some of his men climbed the wall and nearly took the city. Then, manifest miracles and great blessings appeared from the Commander of the Faithful (peace be upon him), many of his soldiers were killed, and he withdrew in defeat. Praise be to Him in all circumstances."

Thus, initially, the people of Najaf won their third consecutive victory over the Wahhabi forces. But the Wahhabis were able to loot the treasury vault and destroy the dome of the Shrine of Imam Ali.

== Aftermath ==
The raids had a significant repercussions while a man travelled to Diriyah and assassinated Abdulaziz bin Muhammad Al Saud in revenge of the raids on Najaf and Karbala. The raids on Najaf and Karbala continued up to 1811. They were a major cause of the Ottoman–Wahhabi war.

== See also ==
- Background of the Ottoman–Wahhabi war
- Battle of Medina (1812)
- Capture of Mecca (1813)
- Demolition of al-Baqi
- Shia Islam in Saudi Arabia
- Siege of Diriyah
- Wahhabi sack of Karbala
