= Capture of Yanbu =

Capture of Yanbu may refer to:

- Capture of Yanbu (1811) by the Ottomans during the Ottoman–Wahhabi war
- Capture of Yanbu (1916) by Arab rebels during the Arab Revolt

== See also ==
- Battle of Yanbu
