= Ottoman–Wahhabi war =

1811–1818 conflict between Egypt and the first Saudi state

Date	1811 – 15 September 1818
Location	Arabian Peninsula
Result	Ottoman victory
Territorial changes	End of the Emirate of Diriyah

Belligerents
Ottoman Empire	Emirate of Diriyah

Commanders and leaders
(Ottoman Empire) Mahmud II; Muhammad Ali; Tusun Pasha (WIA); Ibrahim Pasha; Isma'il Pasha Abu Jabal (WIA); Abidin Bey	Saud I # Abdallah I (executed); Ghaliyya Al Bogammiah # Sheikh Sulayman (executed)

Casualties and losses
~10,000 dead or wounded ~12,000 total loses	14,000 killed 6,000 taken as prisoners of war Unknown number of civilian deaths

The Ottoman–Wahhabi war, or Wahhabi war, was fought from early 1811 until 1818 between the Ottoman Empire, its vassal the Eyalet of Egypt, and the Wahhabis’ Emirate of Diriyah (later known as the first Saudi state), resulting in the destruction of the latter.

== Names ==
While the official name of the Wahhabi state was the Emirate of Diriyah, the war was historically referred to as the "Wahhabi War" in English. The Encyclopaedia of Islam was unaware of other names of the war as of its 1938 supplement. It did not name the Emirate of Diriyah, but described success against "the Wahhabi power." Modern names include the "Egyptian–Wahhabi war", and the "Ottoman/Egyptian–Wahhabi war." The name "Kingdom of Saudi Arabia" was only adopted by the Kingdom of Hejaz and Nejd in 1932. Modern names like the "Egyptian–Saudi war", and Ottoman–Saudi War (Note: See: Meredith Reid Sarkees; Frank Wayman (2010). Resort to War: 1816 - 2007. Sage. p. 198. ISBN 978-0-87289-434-1.; Richard Engel (2016). Two Decades in the Middle East. Simon and Schuster. p. 40. ISBN 978-1-4516-3512-6. "The Ottomans pushed back with the 1811–18 Ottoman Wahhabi War, led by the Ottoman's viceroy in Egypt."; Valerie Anishchenkova (2020). Modern Saudi Arabia. ABC-CLIO. p. 42. ISBN 978-1-4408-5705-8. "Although the Ottomans were able to defeat the First Saudi State in the Ottoman–Wahhabi War (1811–1818), the House of Al Saud was able to restore its rule in Central and Eastern Arabia in a short time.") then appeared. Some Saudi figures have been attempting to diminish the role of Wahhabism in their history and avoid using the "Wahhabi" names. Some consider using the term Wahhabi an epithet.

== Background ==
=== The Industrial Revolution and Ottoman Economic Decline ===
The 18th century was a time of decline and modernization of the Ottoman Empire. The Industrial Revolution began in Western Europe, and it created a flood of cheap goods that traditional small Ottoman workshops could not compete with. The closure of these workshops caused unemployment, loss of tax revenue, and currency devaluation in the Ottoman Empire. The technologies of the First Industrial Revolution required large amounts of high quality coal, navigable rivers, and a cool climate. The Ottomans would not be able to successfully compete with the Western European manufacturers without technological advances that were not available for the duration of the Empire. The Industrial Revolution had other negative effects for the Ottomans. It contributed to a rapid decline in the cost of ocean shipping, roughly two thirds between the 1770s and 1820s. This led to goods increasingly travelling by sea rather than overland on Ottoman Imperial trade routes, which were sources of tax revenue for the empire and income for Bedouin convoys. The economic pain led to increasing dissatisfaction with Ottoman rule, a "general perception of that time that things were going wrong," and mounting criticism.

=== The Wahhabi Movement ===
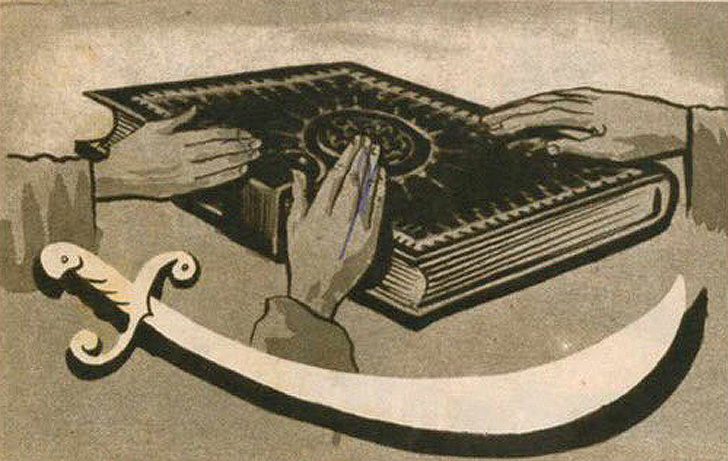
Illustration of the Diriyah Pact

One of the most historically significant critics of the Ottomans in this period was Muhammad Ibn 'Abd al-Wahhab, the founder and leader of the Wahhabi movement. The term Wahhabi was written, and possibly first used, by Muhammad's older brother Sulayman ibn Abd al-Wahhab. Sulayman opposed his younger brother's movement and convinced many Bedouin tribal chiefs not to follow his brother with his letters. Muhammad Ibn Abd al-Wahhab was greatly influenced by the works of classical Islamic scholars Ibn Taymiyya and Ibn al-Qayyim, who had a significantly different formulation of Monotheism (Tawhid) than his predecessors.

Muhammad Ibn Abd al-Wahhab opposed what were then mainstream religious practices that dated back to the Islamic Golden Age or before. Many of these were associated with Sufism, such as the visiting and veneration of the shrines and tombs of Muslim saints. He claimed these amounted to heretical religious innovation or even idolatry. However, his doctrine was not accepted by other Sunnis or other branches of Islam. The Wahhabis called themselves the Muwahhidun, from his doctrine on Tawhid, but the name Wahhabi stuck anyway.

Muhammad Ibn al-Wahhab cofounded of the Emirate of Diriyah in Najd (Central Arabia) by signing the Diriyah pact and joining forces with Muhammad bin Saud Al Muqrin and what became known as the House of Saud. In the years that followed, he gained supporters and his movement grew. By 1765, the movement counted the majority of people in Najd as its followers. Although he had indirectly expressed critiques on the Ottoman dynasty in his letters, he had decided not to publicly challenge the legitimacy of the empire as a precautionary measure. He did not acknowledge their caliphate claims, an assertion made by Sultan Abdul Hamid I after the Ottoman defeat in the 1770s Russo-Turkish war, to portray himself as the leader of the Muslim world.

Muhammad Ibn 'Abd al-Wahhab died in 1792, but his ideology and teachings are viewed as responsible for the war that occurred later. However, this did not imply that he personally sought a conflict with the Ottomans, as classical Wahhabi doctrines did not view the establishment of a caliphate as a necessity upon individual Muslims. Ibn 'Abd al-Wahhab was rather alarmed by what he claimed was the erosion of religious morality in neighboring Ottoman vilayets and found fault with the administrative functioning of the Ottoman Empire, which he criticized for not properly enforcing Sharia (Islamic law) in its territories. This included an economic criticism, as Ottoman economic decline led to taxes that the Wahhabis argued against on religious grounds. The Wahhabis believed that they offered an alternative religious and political model to that of the Ottomans and had a separate claim to Islamic leadership. They called for social reform based on their doctrines. These differences eventually led the new small state to move beyond the cautious criticisms against the vast neighboring empire that its founders had avoided.

=== From Ideological Conflict to Political Conflict ===
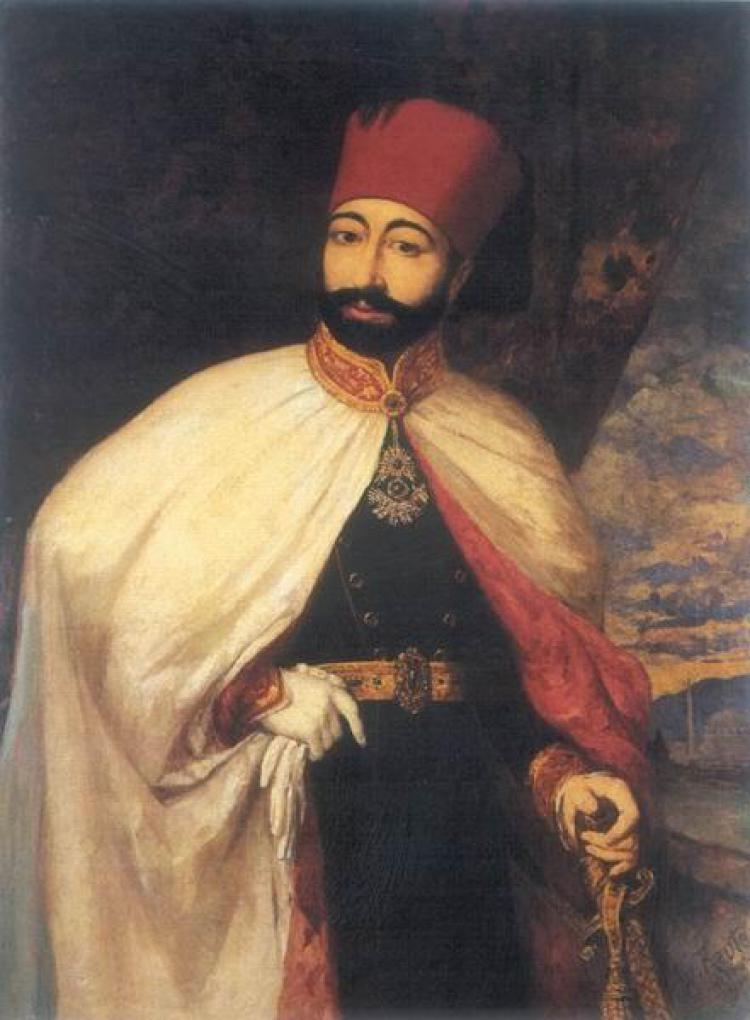
Ottoman Sultan Mahmud II

Political hostility and distrust would eventually lead the Wahhabis and the Ottomans to declare mutual exchanges of Takfir (excommunication), many years after Muhammad Ibn 'Abd al-Wahhab's death. By the 1790s, the Wahhabis had consolidated their rule over most regions of Central Arabia. Growing Wahhabi influence alarmed Ghalib ibn Musa'id, the Sharif of Mecca, who responded by starting a war with the Wahhabis in 1793. Intending to form a military coalition to defeat them, he corresponded with Ottoman authorities in Istanbul. He sought to create hostility towards the Wahhabis by portraying them as disbelievers (a declaration that they were apostates). Similar efforts were made by the ruler of Baghdad. These reports, along with Wahhabi expansion, eventually succeeded in turning the Ottoman bureaucrats against the Wahhabis. There became significant hostility towards the movement.

In 1797, Sulayman the Great, the Ottoman governor of Iraq, invaded Diriyah with around 15,000 troops in co-ordination with Ghalib. They laid siege to Al-Ahsa for a month. However, re-inforcements led by Saud ibn 'Abd al-Azeez would force the Ottomans to retreat. After three days of skirmishes, Sulayman the Great and the Wahhabis came to a peace settlement which was to last for six years. However, the peace would be broken in 1801, when a caravan of pilgrims protected by a Wahhabi convoy was plundered near Hail; upon orders from the Mamluk administration in Baghdad. This attack would completely break down the already deteriorating Wahhabi-Ottoman diplomatic relations, and the Wahhabi's Emirate of Diriyah sent a large-scale expedition towards Iraq.

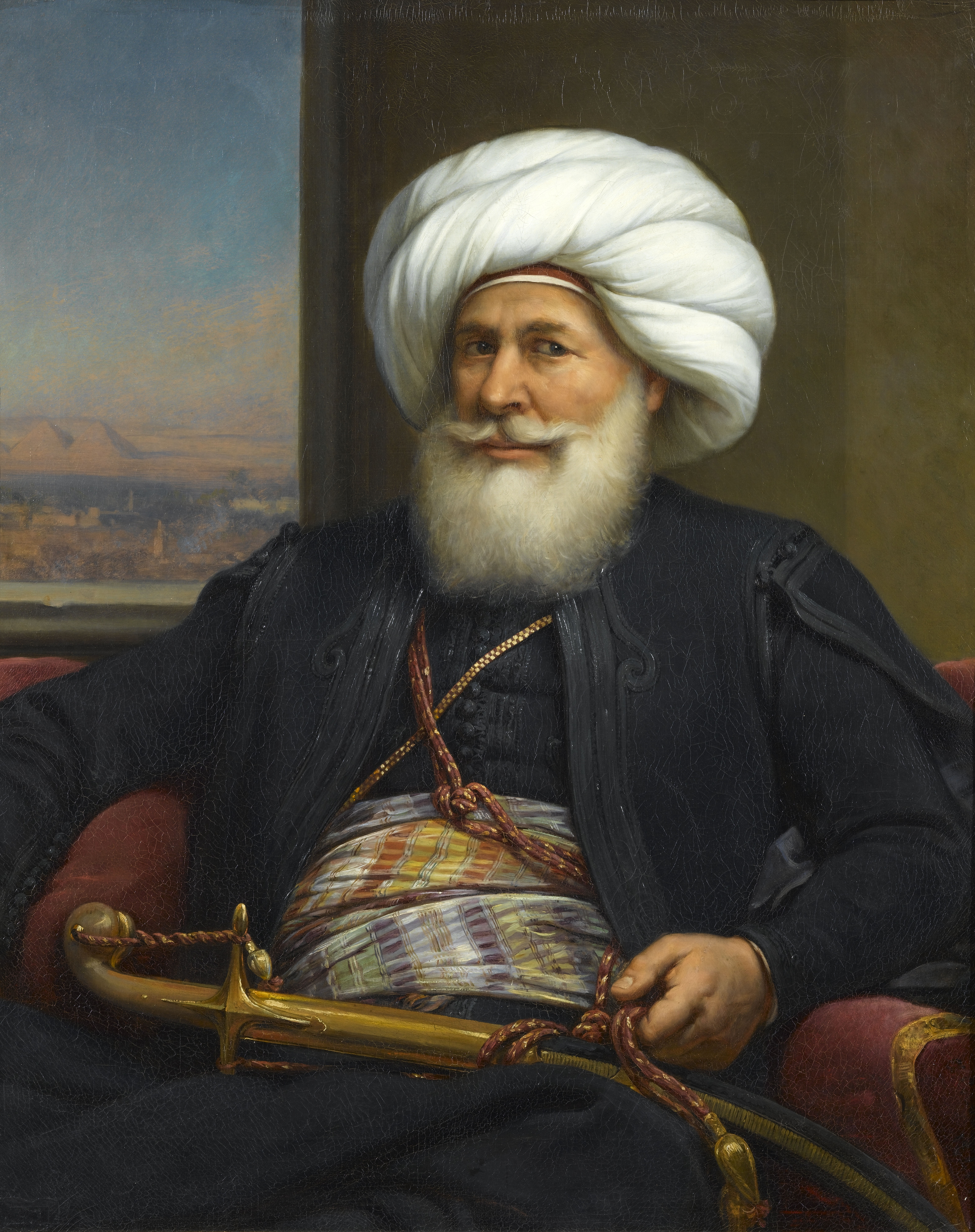
Muhammad Ali of Egypt

There were multiple Wahhabi raids on Najaf. In 1802, 12,000 Wahhabis sacked Karbala in Iraq killing up to 5,000 people and plundering the Imam Husayn shrine. Wahhabi forces led by Abdulaziz bin Muhammad Al Saud entered Mecca in 1803 after defeating Ghalib and forcing his surrender. The assassination in November 1803 of Abdulaziz during prayers in al-Dir'iyya by an Iraqi; was suspected of being orchestrated by the Mamluk governor of Baghdad, which greatly deteriorated Wahhabi-Ottoman relations. Ghalib had worked hard to dampen the prospects of reconciliation between the Emirate of Diriyah (later the first Saudi state) and the Ottoman Empire. In the ensuing conflict, the Wahhabis gained control of Mecca and Medina by 1805. After his assassination, Abdulaziz was replaced as his son Saud bin Abdulaziz Al Saud (1748–1814). He also held the titles Emir and Imam of Diriyah. He denounced the Ottoman sultan and called into question the validity of his claim to be caliph and guardian of the sanctuaries of the Hejaz. Under his rule, the Wahhabis also attacked Ottoman trade caravans which led to further deterioration of Ottoman finances.

In response, Ottoman Sultan Mahmud II, ordered Muhammad Ali, governor of Egypt, to attack the Wahhabi state in December 1807. Ali had embarked on an extensive modernization program that included a significant expansion of Egypt's military forces. The Ottomans had grown increasingly wary of Ali's reign. Ordering him to go to war with the Wahhabi state would serve their interests in either victory or defeat as the destruction of either's forces would be beneficial to them. Tensions between Ali and his troops also contributed to his decision to send them to Arabia and fight against the Wahhabi movement, where many would die rather than be able to challenge his rule in Egypt. Events within Egypt delayed the expedition until 1811.

== Campaigns ==
=== First Campaign (1811–1813) ===
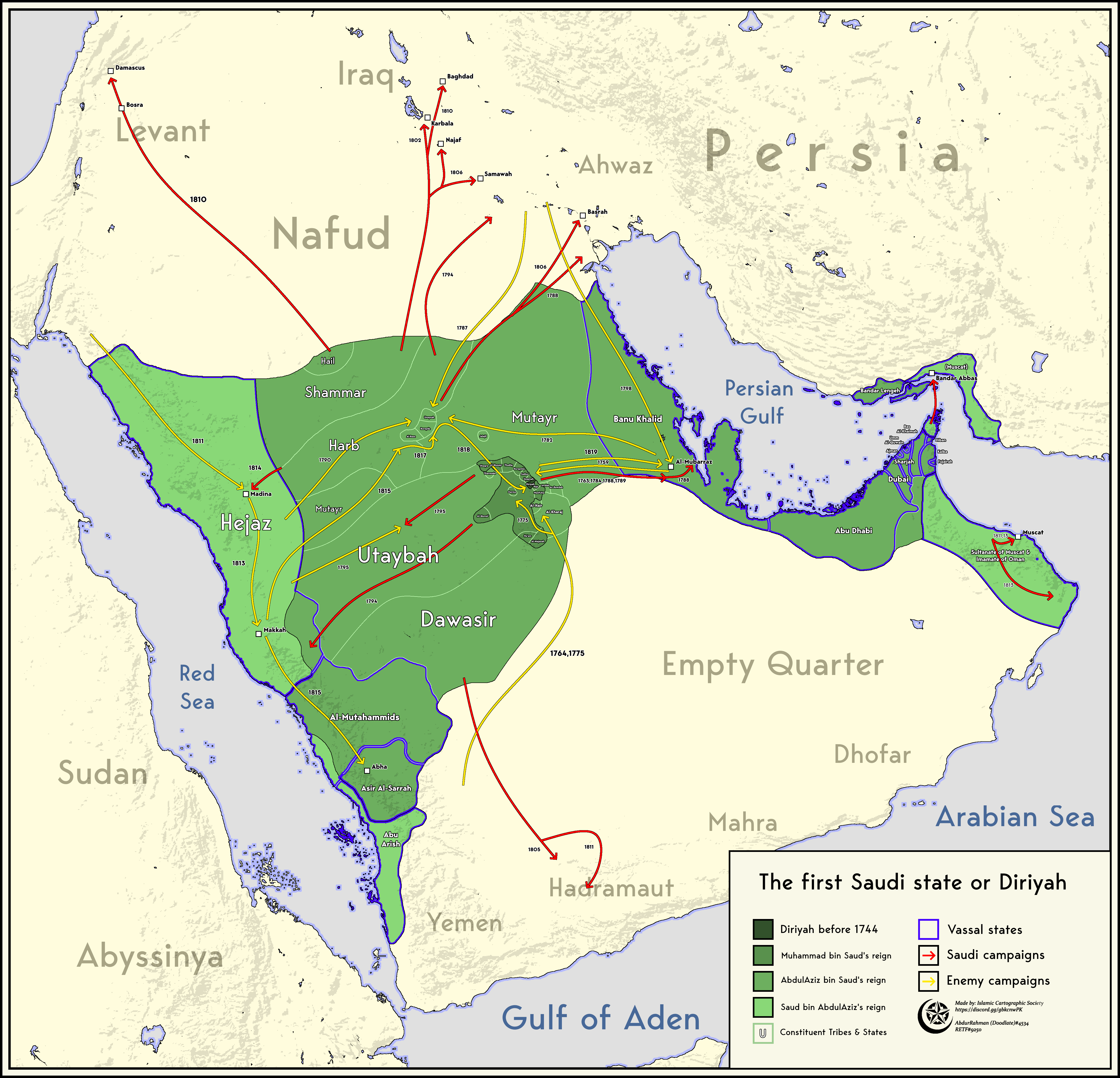
Campaigns with the Emirate of Diriyah

In 1811, Muhammad Ali's Ottoman troops landed in Yanbu under the command of his son Tusun Pasha. They captured the city of Yanbu in a bloodless confrontation where all of Al-Saud's forces surrendered. The Ottoman troops then moved south to attempt to recapture the city of Medina. However, the Ottomans were decisively defeated at the Battle of Al-Safra in 1812 during their initial attempt to reach the city. 5,000 Ottoman troops were killed by the Wahhabis who successfully repelled them from the area. The Ottomans were forced to retreat back to Yanbu. Muhammad Ali Pasha then sent an additional 20,000 troops to help recapture Medina. The Ottoman forces successfully reached the city in their second attempt and won Battle of Medina in late 1812. A small Ottoman contingent then recaptured the city of Jeddah without a fight a month later. A week after that, in January 1813, Ottoman troops also captured Mecca without a fight. Both cities had been ruled by the Ottomans for centuries and preferred their rule to the Wahhabis. At the end of the first campaign, the five major cities of Western Arabia (Hejaz) had returned to Ottoman rule. However, Wahhabi power remained intact to the east.

=== Second Campaign (1813–1816) ===
To signal reestablished authority and inspire confidence, Muhammad Ali Pasha decided to visit the area in person in 1813. He arrived in September 1813 in Jeddah with 2,000 infantry, 2,000 cavalry, and 8,000 camels. The camels carried a large amount of supplies and ammunition for the Ottoman army. He set about recapturing the remaining areas of Western Arabia. His troops marched east and were successful in many tribal areas. However, these minor fights tired the troops and they were initially unable to regain control of Turubah in 1813 when they attempted a siege of the city. In early 1814, a force led by Abidin Bey not only failed to recapture Al-Bahah, but was put under siege at the city of Taif when it retreated. The Ottomans were able to break the Siege of Taif, but were then only able to recapture and hold the city of Al Qunfudhah for around a month. In 1815, one of the main rebels, Bakhroush bin Alass of Zahran tribe, was killed and beheaded by Muhammad Ali's forces in Al Qunfudhah. In the spring of 1815, Ottoman forces inflicted large-scale defeat upon the Saudis, forcing them to conclude a peace treaty. Under the terms of treaty, the Wahhabis had to give up Hijaz. Abdullah ibn Saud was forced to acknowledge himself as the vassal of the Ottoman Empire and obey its Sultan unquestionably. However, neither Muhammad Ali nor the Ottoman Sultan had confirmed the treaty.

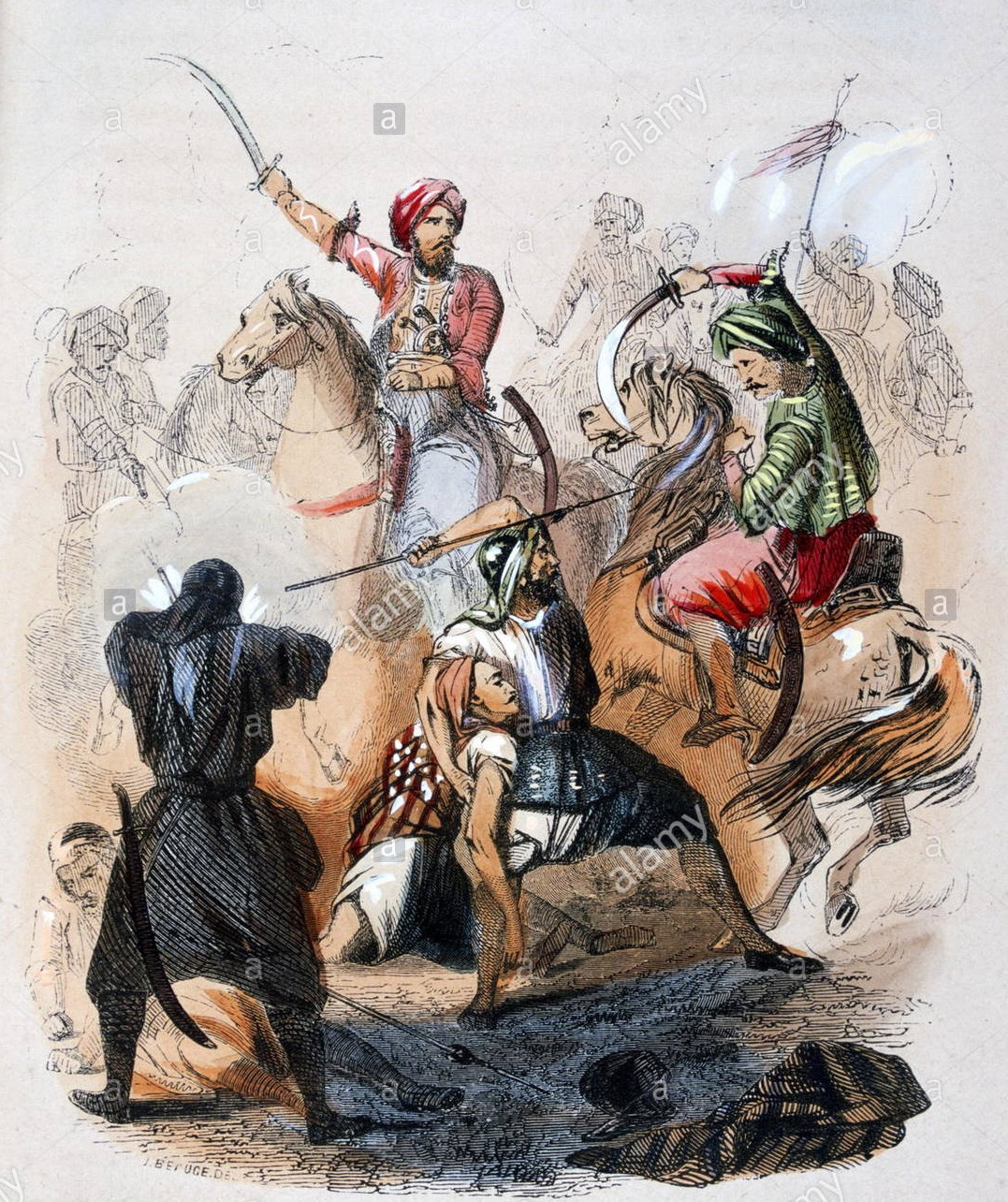
Ibrahim Pasha fighting in the Third Campaign

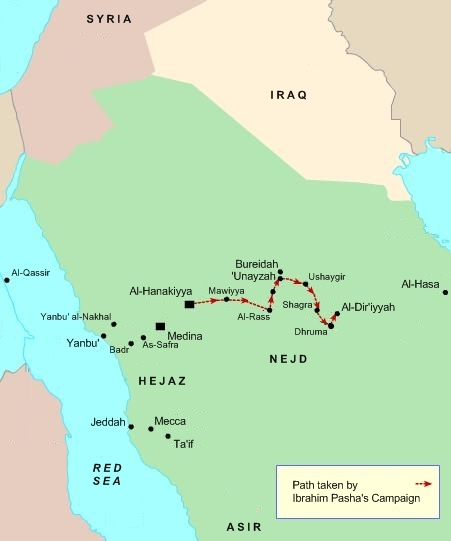
A route-map of Ibrahim Pasha's Campaign into Diriyah

=== Third Campaign (1816–1818) ===
Suspicious of Wahhabi Emir Abdullah, the Ottomans resumed the war in 1816, with the assistance of French military instructors. The Ottoman-Egyptian force was led by Muhammad Ali's elder son, Ibrahim Pasha, and penetrated into the heart of Central Arabia, besieging the chief centres of Qasim and Najd. Waging a war of extermination between 1816 and 1818, the invading armies pillaged various towns and villages, forcing the inhabitants to flee and seek refuge in remote regions and oases. By 1817, the armies had overrun Rass, Buraida and Unayza. Saudi armies put up a fierce resistance at Al-Rass where they withstood a siege of 3 months. Faced with the advance of the Ottoman-Egyptian army, Emir Abdullah retreated to his Emirate of Diriyah.

The Ottomans began the Najd Expedition in 1818, involving a series of military conflicts. En route to Dariyya, the Ottoman armies executed everyone over ten years age in Dhurma. Ibrahim's forces would march towards Diriyya during the early months of 1818, easily routing Saudi resistances and arrive at the capital by April 1818. The Siege of Diriyah would last until September 1818, with the Ottoman forces waiting for Saudi supplies to run out. On 11 September 1818, Abdullah Ibn Saud would sue for peace, offering his surrender, in exchange for sparing Diriyah. However, the city would be razed to ground by order of Ibrahim Pasha. It was not until September 1818 that the Wahhabi state formally ended with the surrender of its leaders and the Wahhabi head of state, Emir Abdullah bin Saud, taken captive and sent to Istanbul to be executed.

== Aftermath ==
=== Fate of the Wahhabis and the Destruction in Arabia ===
George Forster Sadleir left a record on the aftermath of the former capital of the Wahhabi state:

"The site of Deriah is in a deep ravine north-west of Munfooah, about ten miles distant. It is now in ruins, and the inhabitants who were spared, or escaped from the slaughter, have principally sought shelter here ... Munfooah ... was surrounded with a wall and ditch which the Pacha ordered to be razed .... Riad is not so well peopled .... The inhabitants were at that time in a more wretched state than at any prior period since the establishment of the power of the Wahabees. Their walls, the chief security for their property, had been razed ... The year's crop had been consumed by the Turkish force"

Wahhabi leader 'Abdullah ibn Saud was transported first to Cairo and then to Istanbul. He was beheaded in December alongside several other Wahhabi Imams, and his corpse was publicly displayed, on the orders of the Ottoman Sultan Mahmud II. Other than 'Abdullah, most of the political leaders and members of the Saudi family were treated well. After the Destruction of Diriyah, Ibrahim Pasha rounded up the prominent survivors of the Saudi family and the scholarly Al ash-Sheikh many of whom were deported to Egypt. Per Ottoman estimates, over 250 members related to the Saudi family and 32 members related to the Al ash-Sheikh were exiled.

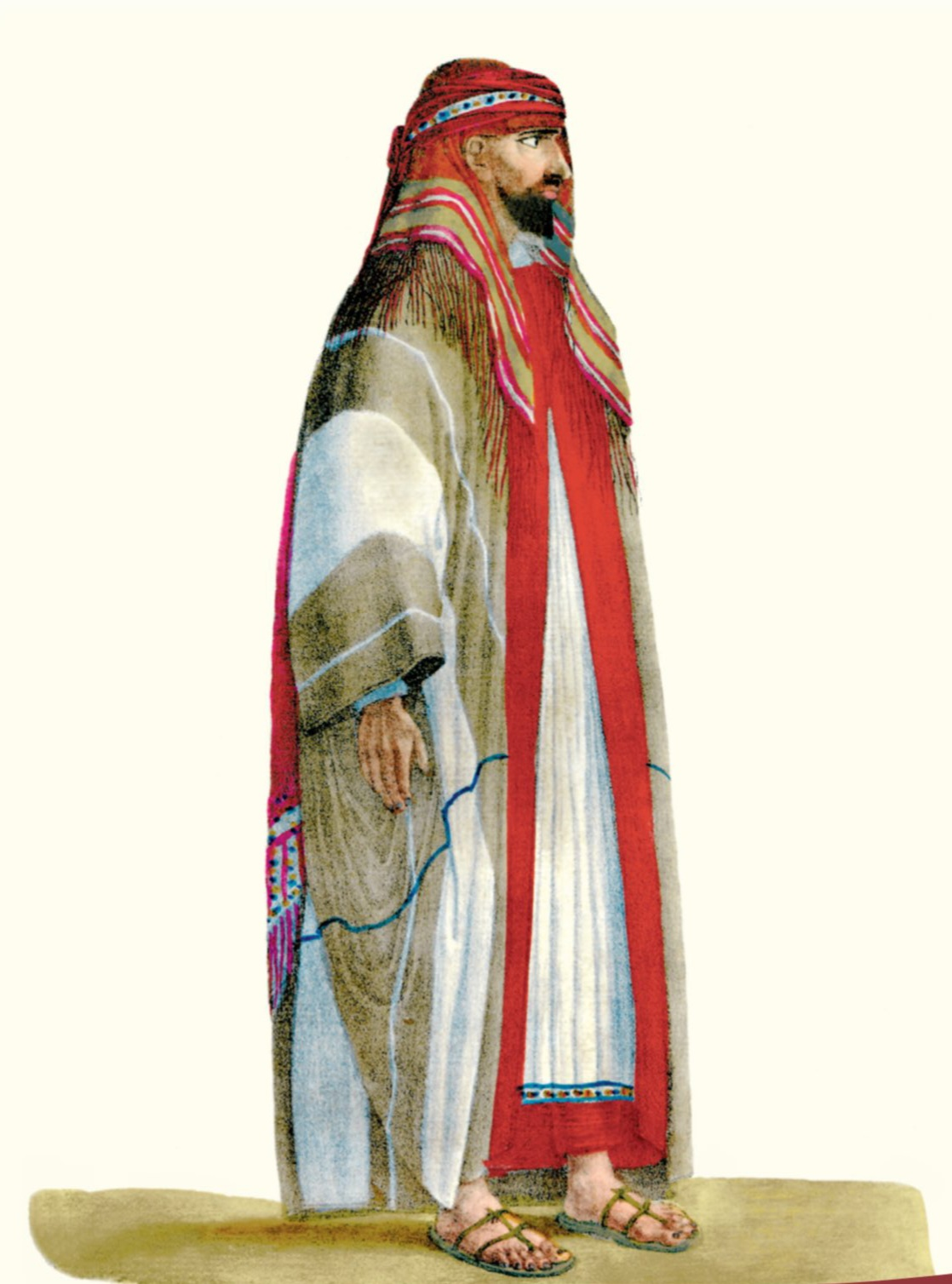
Drawing of Abdullah bin Saud

The Ottomans were far harsher with the religious leaders that inspired the Wahhabi movement, executing Sūlayman ibn 'Abd Allah Aal-Shaykh and other religious notables, as they were thought to be uncompromising in their beliefs and therefore a much bigger threat than the political leaders. Prominent scholars such as the Qadi of Dir'iyya, Sulayman ibn 'Abd Allah (the grandson of Muhammad ibn Abdul-Wahhaab) were tortured, forced to listen to guitar (knowing the Najdi prescriptions and customs that prohibited music) and executed by a firing-squad. Other ulema such as Abd Allah ibn Muhammad Aal Al-Shaikh and his nephew Abd al Rahman ibn Hasan Aal Al-Shaikh would be exiled to Egypt (the latter would return to Najd in 1825, to revive and lead the Wahhabi movement). Some other Qadis and scholars were hunted down and executed. Abd al Aziz ibn Hamad al Mu'ammar managed to settle in Bahrain, where the ruler welcomed him. Few scholars managed to escape to the remote Southern corners of Arabia. The executions reflected how seriously the Ottomans viewed the Wahhabi threat, and were also motivated by deep Ottoman resentment of Wahhabi views. Altogether, the Najdis lost about two dozen scholars and men from the ulema families in the aftermath of the invasion.

=== Subsequent Wahhabi-Ottoman Conflict ===
Later, Ibrahim Pasha of Egypt and his troops went on to conquer Qatif and el-Hasa. Remnants of Wahhabi fortifications were demolished across Najd. The Emir's relatives and important Wahhabi leaders were taken captive and exiled to Egypt. In December 1819, Ibrahim Pasha returned to Egypt after formally incorporating Hejaz into the Ottoman Empire. However, they were unable to totally subdue the opposition forces and Central Arabia became a region of permanent Wahhabi uprisings and the attempted suppression proved to be a failure. In the 1823, Prince Turki ibn 'Abd Allah ibn Muhammed ibn Saud, gathed growing support from tribes and groups that opposed the Turkish occupation, and laid Siege to Riyadh. By August 1824, Al-Saud had captured Riyadh in a Second Siege, and established the Emirate of Nejd (later known as the Second Saudi State) with Riyadh as its capital.

=== British Intervention ===
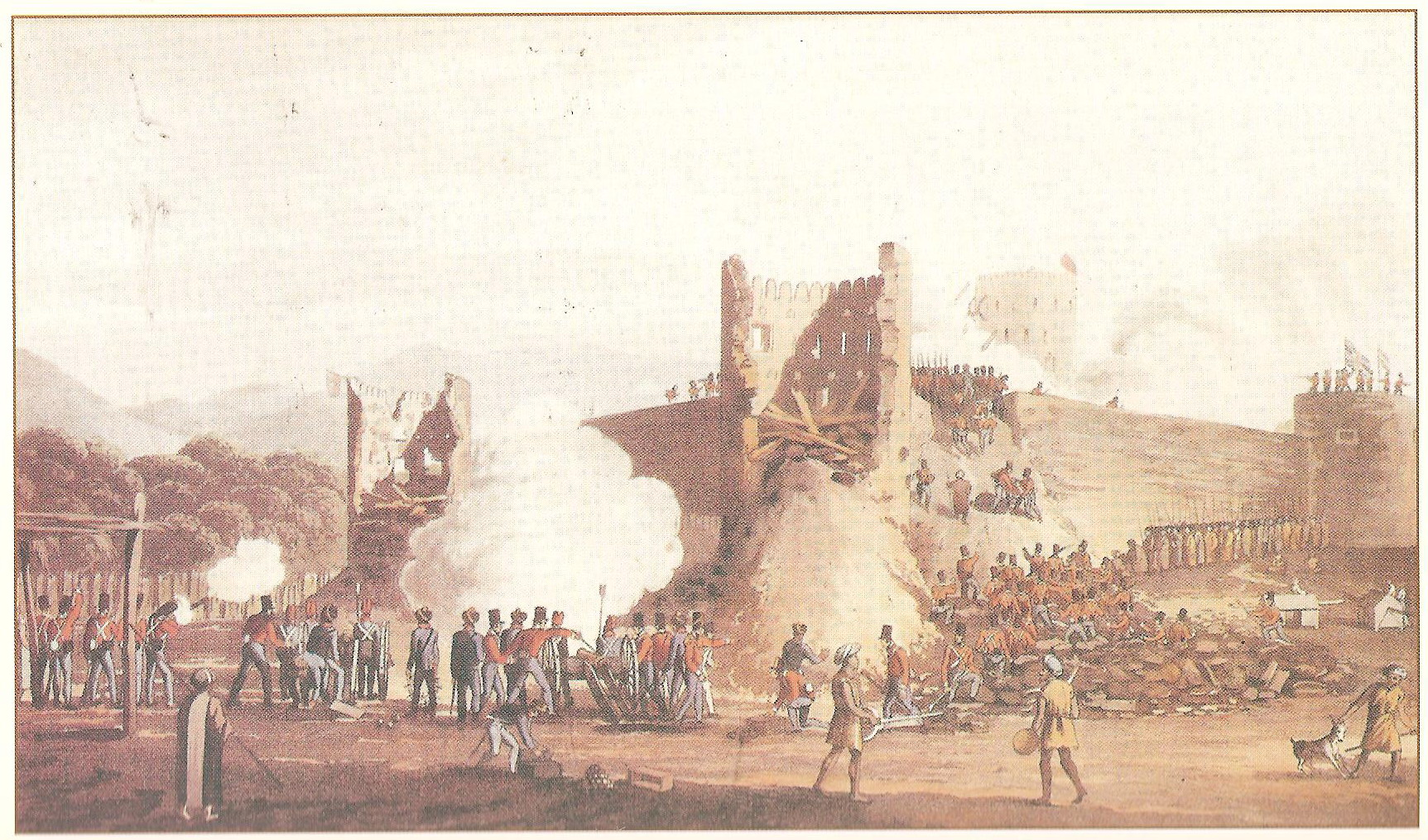
Destruction of Ras al-Khaimah by British troops

The British Empire welcomed Ibrahim Pasha's siege of Diriyah with the goal of promoting their trade interests in the region. Captain George Forster Sadleir, an officer of the British Army in India, was dispatched from Bombay to consult with Ibrahim Pasha in Diriyah. Following the fall of the first Saudi state, the British empire launched their Persian Gulf campaign of 1819. A formidable force consisting of 2,800 British soldiers and 3 warships fought the Qasimi tribesmen allied to Diriyah. Their city Ras al Khaimah was demolished in 1819. The General Maritime treaty was concluded in 1820 with the local chieftains, which would eventually transform them into a protectorate of Trucial States; heralding a century of British supremacy in the Gulf.

=== Wider Influence of Wahhabism ===
In the aftermath of the war, there was continual hatred between the Wahhabi movement and the Ottoman Empire. Wahhabi views were likely a factor in the persecution of Sufis in the following century. The war continues to influence modern Turkey where many Turkish Imams consider Wahhabism to be un-Islamic. Wahhabism also influenced movements aligned with the Ottomans and their successor states such as Islamic neo-traditionalism and Sufism that were critical of Wahhabism or opposed to aspects of it. Saudi Arabia, which became a nation a century later, considers the war to be the start of their struggle for independence from the Ottoman Empire. However, in the 21st century it engaged in a "conscious uncoupling" with Wahhabism. It stopped requiring adherence to the ideology and some Saudi academics called to rewrite the history of the state to begin years before ibn Abd al-Wahhab joined the Diriyah pact. The Saudis continue to view Turkey, as the main successor state of the Ottoman Empire, with suspicion. Saudi-Turkey relations are still influenced by past hostility. Contemporary Saudi and Turkish nationalist writers accuse each other of engaging in systematic campaigns of historical revisionism.

Some Western scholars and commentators also viewed Wahhabism as promoting ahistorical or fanatical views. The historian Bernard Lewis referred to the Wahhabis using Saudi oil wealth to "promulgate bizarre doctrines" and likened the Wahhabi relationship with Islam to that of the Ku Klux Klan with Christianity. He believed it "was a reaction to the general perception of that time that things were going wrong." However, by the 20th century, many Gulf states saw the adoption of Wahhabi views in the wider Islamic world as necessary for their legitimacy. Without their independence from the Ottomans, their newly discovered oil wealth would have belonged to the wider Empire rather than to them individually. The spread of Wahhabism was also seen as a way to increase their geopolitical influence. As such, they spent large amounts of money on the International propagation of the Salafi movement and Wahhabism.

== See also ==
- Expedition to Najd (1836)
- Egypt–Saudi Arabia relations
- Fitnat al-Wahhabiyya
- Hadith of Najd
- History of Wahhabism
- Khawarij
- List of wars involving Saudi Arabia
- Salafi–Sufi relations
- Saudi Arabia–Turkey relations
