= Capture of Jeddah (1813) =

1813 battle in western Arabia

Coordinates: 21°32′36″N 39°19′22″E

- Part of the Ottoman–Wahhabi war
Date	22 January 1813
Location	Jeddah, Hejaz (western Arabia)
Result	Ottoman-Egyptian victory
Territorial changes	Return of Jeddah to Ottoman rule

Belligerents
Ottoman Empire; Eyalet of Egypt	Emirate of Diriyah

Commanders and leaders
Muhammad Ali Pasha; Mustafa Pasha	Unknown

Strength
A Few Hundred	Unknown

Casualties and losses
None	None

The Capture of Jeddah, a west Arabian (Hejaz) port City, occurred in 1813. It occurred with no casualties in the First Campaign of the Ottoman-Wahhabi war.

== Capture ==
Mustafa Bey, the brother-in-law of Muhammad Ali Pasha, advanced to Jeddah after taking Medina. Meccan Sharif Ghalib ibn Musa'id wanted an end to the decade of Wahhabi rule. He preferred the Ottomans, who had ruled for the prior three centuries. As such, he sent messages to Mustafa Bey inviting him to the cities of his sharifate (or emirate), including Jeddah. Mustafa Bey then dispatched a few hundred soldiers to reclaim the city while his main force went to capture Mecca. Jeddah returned to Ottoman rule without a fight in January 1813.

== Aftermath ==
In September 1813, Muhammad Ali Pasha arrived in Jeddah with a force of 2,000 infantry, 2,000 cavalry, and 8,000 camels carrying equipment and ammunition. Meccan Shariff Ghalib ibn Musa'id, received him well but it did not save him from arrest and exile later that year. After his was replacement, Jeddah became an important base from which the Ottomans began the Second Campaign of the war.

== See also ==
- History of Saudi Arabia
