= Capture of Mecca (1813) =

Part of the Ottoman–Saudi War

- Part of the Ottoman–Wahhabi war
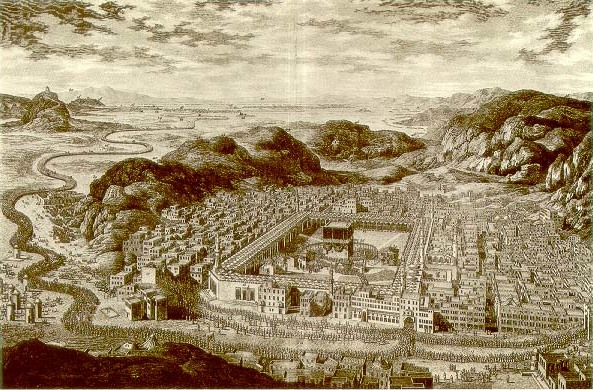
- View of Mecca
Date	22 January 1813
Location	Mecca, Hejaz (western Arabia)
Result	Ottoman-Egyptian victory
Territorial changes	Return of Mecca to Ottoman rule

Belligerents
Ottoman Empire; Eyalet of Egypt	Emirate of Diriyah

Commanders and leaders
(Ottoman Empire) Mustafa Bey (Ottoman Empire) Muhammad Ali Pasha	Uthman Al-Medhyafi

Strength
1,500 men	Unknown

Casualties and losses
None	None

The Capture of Mecca in 1813 took place several days after the Ottoman Capture of Jeddah in the First Campaign of the Ottoman–Wahhabi war.

== Capture ==
Mustafa Bey, the brother-in-law of Muhammad Ali Pasha advanced after taking Medina with a force of a thousand cavalry and five hundred infantry. Meccan Sharif Ghalib ibn Musa'id wanted an end to Wahhabi rule. He preferred Ottoman rule and sent messages to Mustafa Bey, inviting him to his emirate. Saud bin Abdulaziz Al Saud's General, Uthman Al-Medhyafi, met the Ottoman forces but discovered didn't have sufficient strength to resist them. He retreated towards Taif. A few hours before Mustafa Bey's forces recaptured Mecca, he declaired an amnesty for the inhabitants of Mecca. Ghalib then joined forces, around a thousand Arabs and black slaves, with the Ottomans.

== Aftermath ==
After the capture of Mecca and Jeddah, news quickly reached Cairo and celebrations were held for five days. Ottoman forces captured Taif a week after Mecca on 29 January after very minor battles.
