= Siege of Taif (1814) =

Saudi battle in Hejaz, 19th century

- Part of the Wahhabi war
Date	June 1814
Location	Taif, Hejaz (Western Arabia)
Result	Ottoman-Egyptian victory
Territorial changes	Siege of Taif lifted

Belligerents
Ottoman Empire; Eyalet of Egypt	Emirate of Diriyah; Zahran tribe

Commanders and leaders
Muhammad Ali Pasha; Tusun Pasha; Abidin Bey	Abdallah I Bakhrosh ibn A'llas; Tami bin Shu'aib

Strength
20,000 men	10,000 men

Casualties and losses
1,000 killed	Heavy

In 1814, in a counter attack during the Second Campaign of the Ottoman–Wahhabi war, Abdullah bin Saud Al Saud's forces laid siege to the Ottoman held city of Taif. However, troops of Ottoman Egypt governor Muhammad Ali Pasha successfully lifted the siege.

== Siege ==
In 1814, in the month of Shawwal, the Ottomans prepared an expedition force of 20,000 troops. They recruited fighters locally from Mecca and Taif. Commander Abidin Bey then led the force against the Zahran tribes in Al Bahah. The path to Al Bahah was undefended, and they encountered no resistance on the way. However, Al Bahah had multiple forts as well as a large fortress castle that were defended by the troops of Zahran commander Bakhrosh ibn A'llas. The Ottomans encountered resistance and laid siege against the defenders.

When Abdullah bin Saud and the Wahhabis heard of the Ottoman expedition, they marched an army of 10,000 led by Tami bin Shu'aib to relieve the fort. They engaged the Ottomans near the fortress, and defeated them. The Ottomans lost 1,000 men in the battle and retreated to Taif.

The Ottoman garrison at Taif was led by Tusun Pasha, and the Saudis besieged the city, led by Tami bin Shu'aib and Bakhrosh ibn A'llas. Muhammad Ali Pasha heard the situation in Taif and marched with a force of 20 cavalry there. Muhammad Ali then looked upon the besieged city from a mountain. His men captured a Saudi and asked him about the Saudi army. He then offered the prisoner freedom in exchange for sending a letter to Bakhrush in order to fool the enemies of an upcoming large Ottoman relief army. This trick successfully worked, and the siege was lifted from Taif and Muhammad Ali and his son returned to Mecca in June.
