= HMS Suva =

Cruiser of the Royal Navy

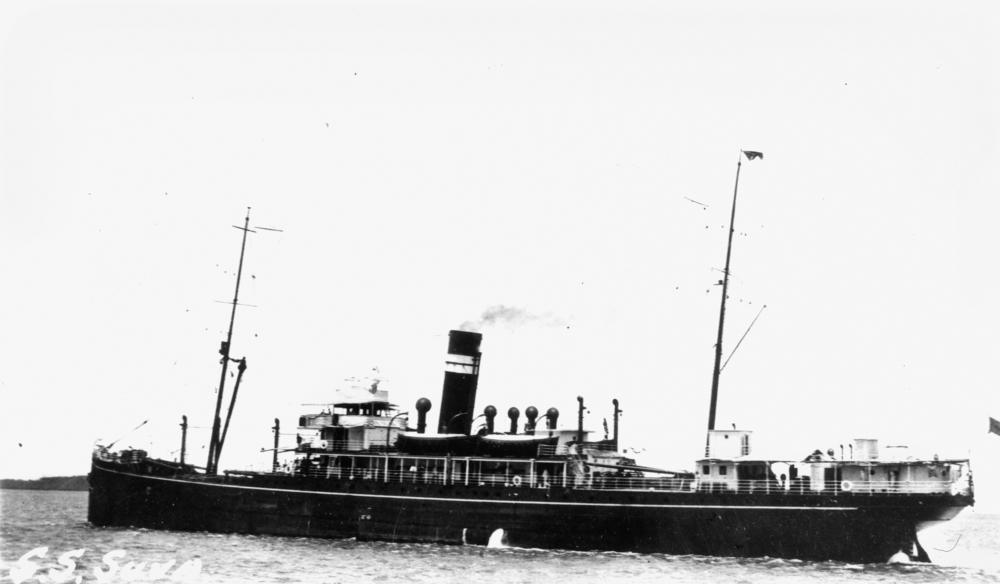
- Suva, circa 1919

History
- Name: Suva (1906–1928); Sirius (1928–1929); Bohol (1929–1941)
- Namesake: Suva, Bohol
- Operator: Australasian United Steam Navigation Company (1906–1928); Madrigal and Company (1928–1929); Fernandez Bros (1929–1941)
- Builder: Workman, Clark and Company
- Launched: 14 December 1905
- Fate: Sunk during air raid on Manila in 1942

United Kingdom (RN)
- Name: HMS Suva
- Commissioned: 20 July 1915
- Decommissioned: 19 December 1919
- Fate: Commissioned in RAN

Australia (RAN)
- Name: HMAS Suva
- Commissioned: 23 June 1919
- Decommissioned: 12 August 1919
- Fate: returned to Australasian United Steam Navigation Company

General characteristics
- Tonnage: 2,126 gross register tonnage
- Length: 300.3 ft (92 m)
- Beam: 41.1 ft (13 m)
- Depth: 11.8 ft (4 m)
- Armament: 3 × 4.7 inch naval guns (1915); 2 × 3 pounder naval guns (1919)

HMS Suva was an Armed boarding steamer of the Royal Navy during World War I. She was also commissioned briefly into the Royal Australian Navy before being returned to her owners. She was sold in 1928 and renamed Sirius and sold again in 1929 and renamed Bohol. An Imperial Japanese air raid on Manila in 1942 during the Second World War sank her.

== Career ==
Built by Workman, Clark and Company, Belfast she was launched in 1906 for the Australasian United Steam Navigation Company and used on the Australia-Fiji run and coastal passenger service from Brisbane.

She was commissioned into the Royal Navy on 20 July 1915 and converted into an armed boarding steamer at Garden Island, New South Wales. She was armed with two QF 4.7 inch naval guns, with a third being fitted in Colombo.

Suva was part of the Red Sea Patrol during the First World War, taking part in the Capture of Yanbu.

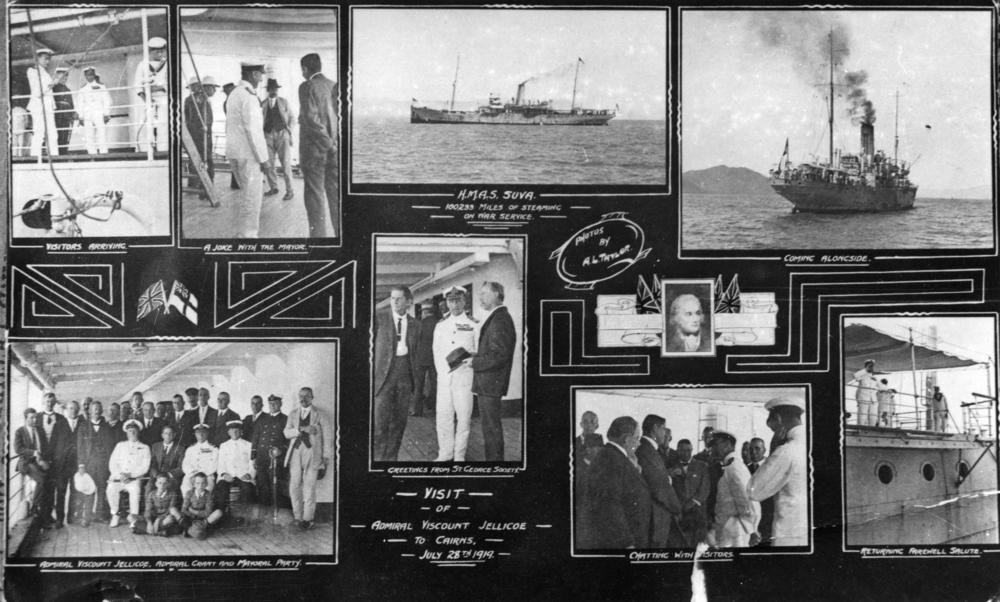
Collage of commemorative photographs, including the visit of Admiral Viscount Jellicoe

She was commissioned into the Royal Australian Navy on 23 June 1919, equipped with two QF 3 pounder naval guns, as HMAS Suva, for transporting Admiral of the Fleet Lord John Jellicoe to the Australia Station and Pacific Islands. Suva was paid off on 12 August and was returned to her owners. Suva was sold in July 1928 to Madrigal and Company, Manila, and renamed Sirius. She was later resold in December 1929 to Fernandez Bros., who renamed her Bohol. A Japanese air attack in Manila Bay sank her on 16 April 1942.
