= Capture of Yanbu (1811) =

1811 confrontation between the Ottomans and Saudi State

- Part of the Wahhabi war
Date	October 1811
Location	Yanbu, Hejaz (Western Arabia) 24.079°N 38.060°E
Result	Ottoman-Egyptian victory

Belligerents
Ottoman Empire	Emirate of Diriyah

Commanders and leaders
Tusun Pasha	Unknown

Strength
14,000 men	300 men

Casualties and losses
None	All surrendered

The Capture of Yanbu, or Yanbu Landing, in 1811 was a military engagement that began the First Campaign of the Ottoman–Wahhabi war. It occurred with virtually no resistance as the Wahhabis had no troops in the area when the Ottomans initially arrived.

== Capture ==
Ottoman Sultan Mahmud II had ordered Egyptian Viceroy Mohammed Ali Pasha to move against the Wahhabis and re-conquer Mecca. Its recapture was seen as necessary to return honor to the Ottoman Empire as custodian of the Holy City. Mohammed Ali sent his son Tusun Pasha in command an army of 14,000 troops. The start of their campaign began with the lannding in Yanbu. It became an initial station to re-conquer other cities that had been captured by the Wahhabis. Tusun's forces landed successfully in Yanbu. The Wahhabis initially had no forces in the area. A contingent of 300 men that arrived from Mecca surrendered without any losses. Nevertheless, the Ottomans looted the city.
