= Battle of Medina (1812) =

Battle of the Ottoman–Saudi War

Coordinates: 24°28′N 39°36′E

- Part of the Wahhabi war
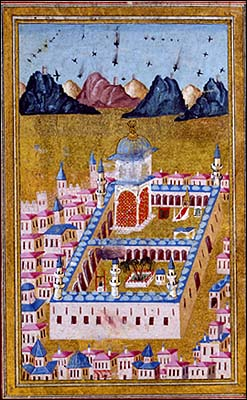
- Medina under Ottoman Rule, Medina Mosque
Date	November 1812
Location	Medina, western Arabia
Result	Ottoman–Egyptian victory

Belligerents
Ottoman Empire; Eyalet of Egypt	Emirate of Diriyah: Harb tribe; Juhaynah tribe

Commanders and leaders
Tusun Pasha; Ahmad Bonaparte	Masoud bin Madhyan Al-Harbi (executed)

Strength
15,000 Infantry; 2,000 Maghrebi soldiers 3,000 African soldiers	14,000

Casualties and losses
50 killed	7,000 casualties

The Battle of Medina in 1812 was part of the First Campaign of the Ottoman–Wahhabi war. Following his defeat at the Battle of Al-Safra, Tusun Pasha's forces regrouped and made another attempt to reach Saud's Wahhabi forces in Medina.

== Prelude ==
After the defeat at the hands of the Saudis in the Battle of Al-Safra, Tusun Pasha fled with his surviving force, heading towards Yanbu, and fortified himself there. Since he had only three thousand fighters out of eight thousand regular soldiers with him, he quickly asked for help from his father, reporting that his defeat was due to disputes between his commanders. The loss shocked Muhammad Ali. Still, it didn't prevent him from continuing the campaign.

In 1812, Muhammad Ali Pasha prepared another expedition, with an army of 20,000 men, 18 guns, and three mortars, led by Ahmad Bonaparte. Both Tusun and Ahmad marched again to Wadi Al-Safra and successfully captured it without a fight. Many of the Arab tribes, such as Juhaynah and Harb tribes supported the Ottomans.

== Battle ==
In October 1812, Tusun was ready again to march against Medina; his men were to rest at daylight and march at night. His march lasted for three nights until they arrived in Medina. Some skirmish happened between the Saudi garrison and the Ottomans, in which Ahmad Bonaparte successfully drove them into the inner city of Medina. The city was well fortified with high walls. the Ottomans prevented from bombarding the city hoping it would not damage Al-Masjid an-Nabawi, Tusun then ordered the inhabitants to stay in their houses to avoid further damage.

The Saudi garrison numbered 14,000 men. They made several sorties for the next fourteen or fifteen days while also suffering from diseases and a lack of water as the Ottomans cut off the water supply. The Ottomans began mining tunnels to blow up the walls. A first attempt by the Ottomans was discovered by the garrison, which stopped the mines. A second attempt was done in November, which successfully destroyed a portion of the walls. The Ottomans charged into the opened gap and successfully fought the Saudi garrison killing 1,000 of them while losing only 50. The remainder of the garrison escaped to a castle nearby, numbering 1,500 men.

The Ottomans, not having proper artillery and the castle being mining proof, besieged them for three weeks until the Saudis, lacking supplies, surrendered with a promise of granting safe and unmolested passage, however, once they had gotten out of the castle, Ahmad Bonaparte broke his promise and attacked them, killing many of them and a few of them escaped. This action disgusted their Arab allies and the garrison leader, Mas'ud Bin Madhian, was taken to Constantinople and executed there.

== Aftermath ==
The capture of Medina was the first major Ottoman-Egyptian victory in the Wahhabi War. Soon, news reached Cairo and celebrations were made for this victory. The Ottoman-Egyptian army then marched to Al Hinakiyah and captured it.
