= Battle of Yanbu =

1916–17 battle of WWI's Arab Revolt

- Part of Arab Revolt of the Middle Eastern theatre of World War I
Date	1 December 1916 – 18 January 1917
Location	Yanbu, Kingdom of Hejaz
Result	Allied victory
Territorial changes	Yanbu annexed to Kingdom of Hejaz

Belligerents
Kingdom of Hejaz; British Empire	Ottoman Empire

The Battle of Yanbu (Arabic: الاستيلاء على ينبع, Turkish: Yanbu'nun yakalanması; 1 December 1916 – 18 January 1917) was an Ottoman attempt to recapture the city of Yanbu during the Arab Revolt.

The attack on Yanbu commenced on 1 December 1916, when Fakhri Pasha and two brigades invaded the outskirts of the city. The Ottomans initially had repelled the revolting Arabs from strategic points in the city. Within a couple of days Fakhri Pasha controlled all routes in and out of the city. The Arab soldiers in the city began constructing a makeshift airstrip for use by British aircraft. More Arab and British reinforcements arrived and strengthened defences in the city.

Five Royal Navy ships also arrived to help in the defence of the city, including HMIS Dufferin, HMS M31 and HMS Suva. T. E. Lawrence stated,

Afterwards, old Dakhil Allah told me he had guided the Turks down to rush Yenbo in the dark that they might stamp out Faisal's army once for all; but their hearts had failed them at the silence and the blaze of lighted ships from end to end of the harbour, with the eerie beams of the searchlights revealing the bleakness of the glacis they would have to cross. So they turned back: and that night, I believe, the Turks lost their war.

By 9 December, Arab counter-attacks opened up the routes to the city, and flights from the seaplane carrier HMS Raven II severely attacked the Ottoman columns. Because of the Navy's presence in the sea off Yanbu, Fakhri Pasha called off all advances on the night of 11/12 December. Due to logistical errors, and counterattacks from the Arabs, the Ottomans started the retreat to Medina on 18 January 1917, thus ending the attempted recapture of Yanbu.
