= Abidin Bey =

Albanian-Egyptian general and politician (d. 1827)

Abidin Bey al-Arnaut
- Born: c. 1780; Albania
- Died: 1827 (aged 46–47) Egypt
- Allegiance: Egypt under Muhammad Ali
- Rank: Commander
- Conflicts: Campaign against the Wahhabi movement (1814); Sudanese campaign (1820)
- Other work: Governor of Dongola

Abidin Bey al-Arnaut (c. 1780–1827) was an Albanian commander and politician of Egypt during the early era of Muhammad Ali's rule. A member of the core group of Muhammad Ali's commanders, after his death the Abdeen Palace named after him was built on the site of his residence in Cairo and a district of the city was renamed to honour him.

== Life ==
In 1814 he led a campaign against the Wahhabi movement but was defeated. A year later he warned Muhammad Ali of an assassination plot against him, an intervention that gave Ali the opportunity to escape the attack. Until 1820, when he was appointed second-in-command in the Sudanese campaign, Abidin was the governor of al-Minya. During the campaign, he distinguished himself in the battle of al-Kurdi.

In April 1821 he became the first governor of the province of Dongola (approximately corresponding to eastern As Samaliya) and had his mansion designed by Christian Gottfried Ehrenberg. His main duties included the building of depots for the resupplying of passing troops and the region's tax assessment. Abidin Bey's taxation system was regarded as just and it contributed to the reduction of revolt risk in the province. However, his shipyard project for the building of sailing ships for the transport of Black African slaves from Sudan to Egypt was unsuccessful. Dongola's political stability during Abidin Bey's rule is considered unusual as rebellions were frequent in all the newly acquired territories of Egypt in the 1820s. After 1825 he returned to Egypt and was killed two years later during a mutiny.

== See also ==
- Turco-Egyptian conquest of Sudan (1820–1824)
