= Muhammad Ali of Egypt =

Ruler of Egypt from 1805 to 1848

Muhammad Ali Pasha
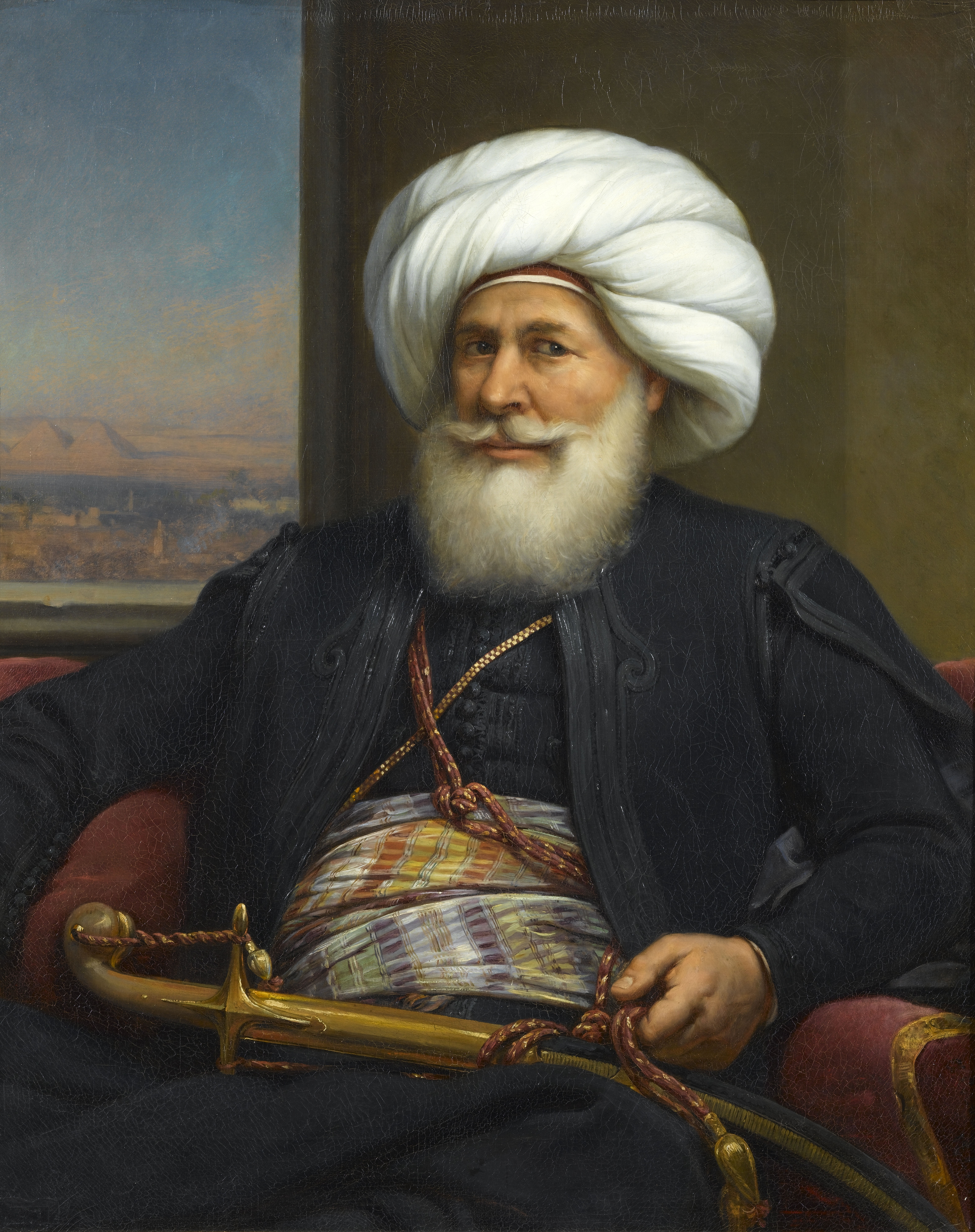
- Portrait by Auguste Couder, 1840

Wāli of Egypt
- In office 17 May 1805 – 20 July 1848
- Monarchs: Selim III; Mustafa IV; Mahmud II; Abdülmecid I
- Preceded by: Hurshid Ahmed Pasha (Beylerbey)
- Succeeded by: Ibrahim Pasha

Personal details
- Born: 4 March 1769 Ottoman Albania
- Died: 2 August 1849 (aged 80) Ras el-Tin Palace, Alexandria, Ottoman Egypt
- Resting place: Muhammad Ali Mosque, Cairo, Egypt
- Spouses: Amina Hanim; Mahduran Hanim; Ayn al-Hayat Qadin; Mumtaz Qadin; Mahwish Qadin; Namshaz Qadin; Zayba Khadija Qadin; Shams Safa Qadin; Shami Nur Qadin; Umm Numan; Naila Qadin; Gulfidan Qadin; Qamar Qadin
- Children: Princess Tawhida Hanim; Ibrahim Pasha of Egypt; Prince Ahmed Tusun Pasha; Prince Isma'il Kamil Pasha; Princess Khadija Nazli Hanim; Sa'id Pasha of Egypt; Prince Abd al-Halim Bey; Prince Muhammad Ali Pasha Al Sahgheer; Princess Zaynab Hanim; Prince Muhammad Abd al-Halim Pasha
- Parents: Ibrahim Agha (father); Zaynab Hanim (mother)
- House: Alawiyya

Military service
- Battles/wars: See battles: French campaign in Egypt and Syria; Battle of Al Khankah; Muhammad Ali's rise to power; Anglo-Turkish War (1807–1809); Alexandria expedition; Wahhabi War; Battle of Mecca; Siege of Taif; Battle of Byssel; Expedition of Najd; Turco-Egyptian conquest of Sudan (1820–1824); Ahmad Revolt; Greek War of Independence; Ottoman–Egyptian invasion of Mani; Kasos Massacre; Egyptian–Ottoman War (1831–1833); Ethiopian–Ottoman border conflict; Syrian Peasant Revolt (1834–1835); Peasants' revolt in Palestine; Alawite Revolt; 1834 looting of Safed; Expedition to Najd (1836); 1838 Druze revolt; Egyptian–Ottoman War (1839–1841); Oriental Crisis of 1840; Bombardment of Beirut; Battle of Sidon; Storming and Capture of Acre

Muhammad Ali (Note: Arabic: محمد علي, romanized: Muḥammad 'Alī; Albanian: Mehmet Ali; Turkish: Kavalalı Mehmed Ali.) (4 March 1769 – 2 August 1849) was an Ottoman viceroy who became the de facto ruler of Egypt from 1805 to 1848, and is widely considered the founder of modern Egypt. A governor of Albanian origin, Ali extended his control from Egypt to include Sudan, Hejaz, the Levant, Cyprus, Crete and parts of Greece at the height of his rule in 1840, and transformed Cairo from a mere Ottoman provincial capital to the center of an expansive empire.

Born in a village in Albania, when he was young he moved with his family to Kavala in the Rumelia Eyalet, where his father, an Albanian tobacco and shipping merchant, served as an Ottoman commander of a small unit in the city. Ali was a military commander in an Albanian Ottoman force sent to recover Egypt from French occupation following Napoleon's withdrawal. He rose to power through a series of political maneuvers, and in 1805 he was named Wāli (governor) of Egypt and gained the rank of Pasha. As Wāli, Ali attempted to modernize Egypt by instituting dramatic reforms in the military, economic and cultural spheres. He also initiated a violent purge of the Mamluks, consolidating his rule and permanently ending the Mamluk hold over Egypt.

Militarily, Ali recaptured the Arabian territories for the sultan, and conquered Sudan of his own accord. His attempt at suppressing the Greek rebellion failed decisively, however, following an intervention by the European powers at Navarino. In 1831, Ali waged war against the sultan, capturing Syria, crossing into Anatolia and directly threatening Constantinople, but the European powers forced him to retreat. After a failed Ottoman invasion of Syria in 1839, he launched another invasion of the Ottoman Empire in 1840; he defeated the Ottomans again and opened the way towards a capture of Constantinople. Faced with another European intervention, he accepted a brokered peace in 1842 and withdrew from the Levant; in return, he and his descendants were granted hereditary rule over Egypt and Sudan. His dynasty would rule Egypt for over a century, until the revolution of 1952 when King Farouk was overthrown by the Free Officers Movement led by Mohamed Naguib and Gamal Abdel Nasser, establishing the Republic of Egypt.

== Name ==
The spelling of Muhammad Ali's first name in both Arabic and Ottoman Turkish was consistent: محمد (Muḥammad). This is the name by which he was known to his Egyptian subjects, and the name used uniformly in Egyptian and Arabic language historical scholarship. However, given his origins in Ottoman Albania and status as a commander in the Ottoman military, his first name is often rendered as Mehmed, which is the standard rendition of that name in Ottoman Turkish, or Mehmet in Albanian. Current English-language historical scholarship is divided as to which is preferable, with the majority opinion favoring the former. Typically, historians accentuating the Egyptian character of his rule opt for Muhammad, whilst those accentuating the Ottoman character opt for Mehmed or Mehmet. This distinction is an issue for those writing in the Latin alphabet, but not in Arabic.

== Early life ==
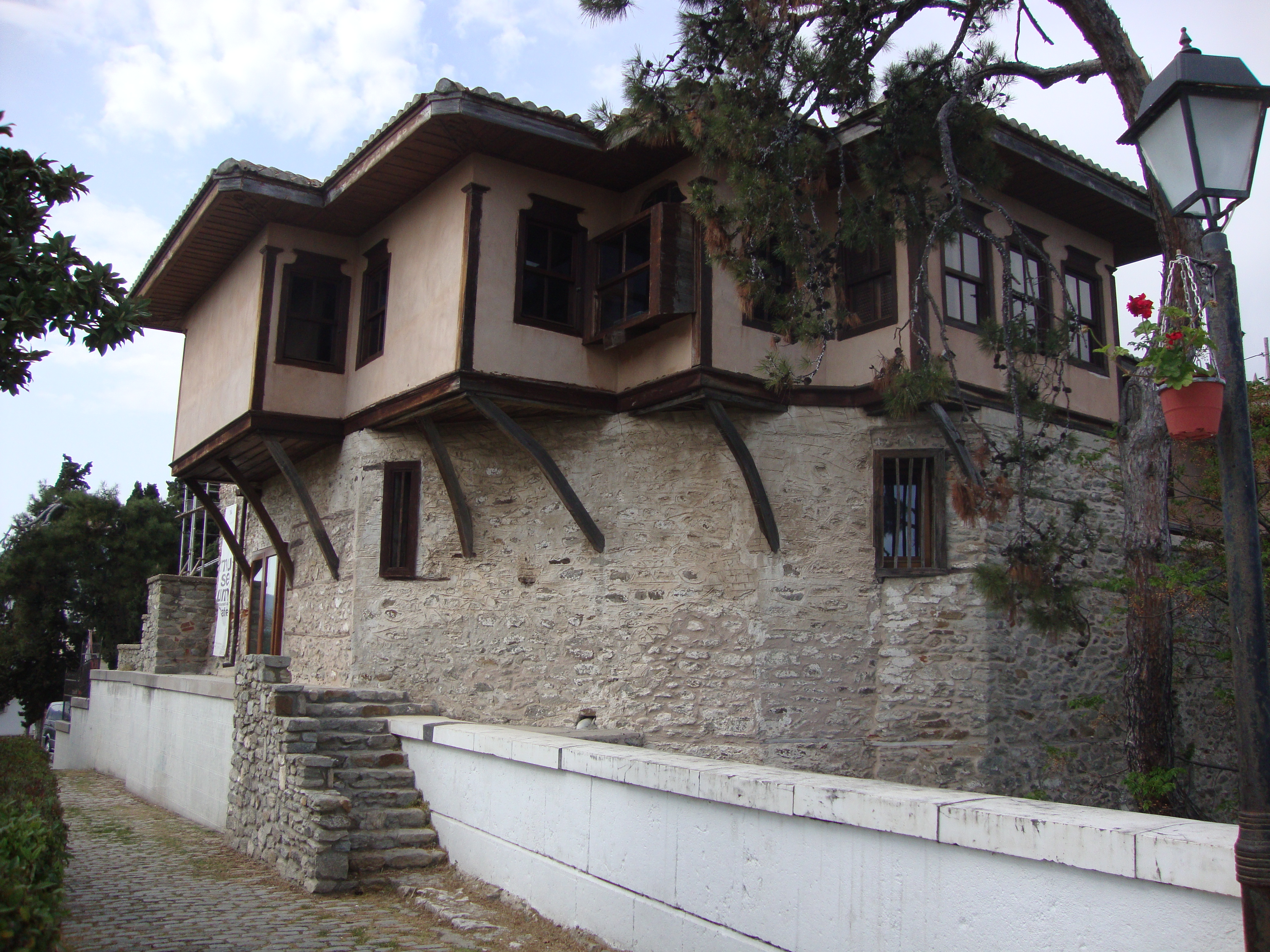
Muhammad Ali's house in Kavala, now in northeastern Greece.

Muhammad Ali was born in a village in Albania in the Ottoman Empire, to ethnic Albanian parents from the Korça region. When he was young he moved with his family to the Sanjak of Kavala (modern-day Kavala), in the Rumelia Eyalet. He was the second son of a Bektashi Albanian tobacco and shipping merchant named Ibrahim Agha, who also served as an Ottoman commander of a small unit in Kavala. His mother was Zaynab Hanim, the daughter of Çorbaci Husain Agha, another Muslim Albanian notable in Kavala. When his father died at a young age, Muhammad was taken and raised by his uncle Husain Agha with his cousins. As a reward for Muhammad Ali's hard work, his uncle gave him the rank of "Bolukbashi" for the collection of taxes in the town of Kavala. Muhammad Ali later married his cousin Amina Hanim, a wealthy widow. She was the daughter of Nusretli Ali Agha, the governor of Kavala, and Kadriye (Zaynab's sister).

After Muhammad's promising success in collecting taxes, he earned the rank of Second Commander (Binbashi) under his cousin Sarecheshme Halil Agha in the Kavala Volunteer Contingent of Albanian mercenaries that was sent to re-occupy Egypt following General Napoleon Bonaparte's withdrawal. In 1801, his unit was sent, as part of a much larger Ottoman force, to re-occupy Egypt following a brief French occupation that upended Mamluk dominance in Egypt. The expedition, aboard xebecs, landed at Aboukir in the spring of 1801. One of his trusted army commanders was Miralay Mustafa Bey, who had married Muhammad's sister Zubayda and was the ancestor of the Yeghen family. He was the brother of Muhammad's first wife, Amina Hanim.

== Rise to power ==
The French withdrawal left a power vacuum in Egypt. Mamluk power had been weakened, but not destroyed, and Ottoman forces clashed with the Mamluks for power. During this period of turmoil, Muhammad Ali used his loyal Albanian troops to work with both sides, gaining power and prestige for himself. As the conflict drew on, the local populace grew weary of the power struggle. In 1801, he allied with the Egyptian leader Umar Makram and Egypt's Grand Imam of al-Azhar. During the infighting between the Ottomans and Mamluks between 1801 and 1805, Muhammad Ali carefully acted to gain the support of the general public.

In 1805, a group of prominent Egyptians led by the ulama (scholars, savants) demanded the replacement of Wāli (governor) Hurshid Pasha by Muhammad Ali, and the Ottomans yielded. In 1809, though, Ali exiled Makram to Damietta. According to Abd al-Rahman al-Jabarti, Makram had discovered Muhammad Ali's intentions to seize power for himself.

Sultan Selim III could not oppose Muhammad Ali's ascension. By appearing as the champion of the people, Muhammad Ali was able to forestall popular opposition until he had consolidated his power.

Massacre of the Mamelukes by Horace Vernet, 1819. The painting depicts the 1811 massacre of Mamelukes at the Citadel of Cairo in 1811

The Mamluks still posed the greatest threat to Muhammad Ali. They controlled Egypt for more than 600 years, and over that time they extended their rule systematically south along the Nile River to Upper Egypt. Muhammad Ali's approach was to eliminate the Mamluk leadership, then move against the rank and file. Muhammad Ali invited the Mamluk leaders to a celebration at the Cairo Citadel in honour of his son, Tusun Pasha, who was to lead a military expedition into Arabia. The event was held on 1 March 1811. When the Mamluks had gathered at the Citadel, they were surrounded and killed by Muhammad Ali's troops. (Note: Reports vary about how many died. William Cleveland claims 74 killed while H. Wood Jarvis claims nearly 500. Whatever the actual number, it is clear that the event dealt a serious blow to the Mamluks.) After the leaders were killed, Muhammad Ali dispatched his army throughout Egypt to rout the remainder of the Mamluk forces.

Muhammad Ali transformed Egypt into a regional power which he saw as the natural successor to the decaying Ottoman Empire. He summed up his vision for Egypt as follows:

I am well aware that the (Ottoman) Empire is heading by the day toward destruction... On its ruins I will build a vast kingdom... up to the Euphrates and the Tigris.

== Building the Egyptian state ==
Sultan Selim III (reigned 1789–1807) had recognized the need to reform and modernize the Ottoman military, along European lines, to ensure that his state could compete. Selim III, however, faced stiff local opposition from an entrenched clergy and military apparatus, especially from the Janissaries. Consequently, he was deposed and ultimately killed in 1808.

Muhammad Ali shared some traits with common warlords seeking to gain the upper hand at the expense of the weakened imperial power, but scholars have noted that Muhammad Ali's rule was the first significant program of Europeanization of the military and its supporting institutions. Unlike Selim, he had dispatched his chief rivals, giving him a free hand to attempt reforms similar to those first begun by Selim III.

Muhammad Ali's goal was for Egypt to leave the Ottoman Empire and be ruled by his own hereditary dynasty. To do that, he had to reorganize Egyptian society, streamline the economy, train a professional bureaucracy, and build a modern military.

His first task was to secure a revenue stream for Egypt. To accomplish this, Muhammad Ali 'nationalized' all the iltizam lands of Egypt, thereby officially owning all the production of the land. He accomplished the state annexation of property by raising taxes on the 'tax-farmers' who had previously owned the land throughout Egypt. The new taxes were intentionally high and when the tax-farmers could not extract the demanded payments from the peasants who worked the land, Muhammad Ali confiscated their properties. The other major source of revenue Muhammad Ali created was a new tax on waqf endowments, which were previously tax-free. Through these endowments, personal income could be set aside for schools or other charitable purposes. As well as raising revenue to fund his new military, this tax took revenue away from the local elite, Mamluks and the ulama, weakening opposition to Muhammad Ali's reforms.

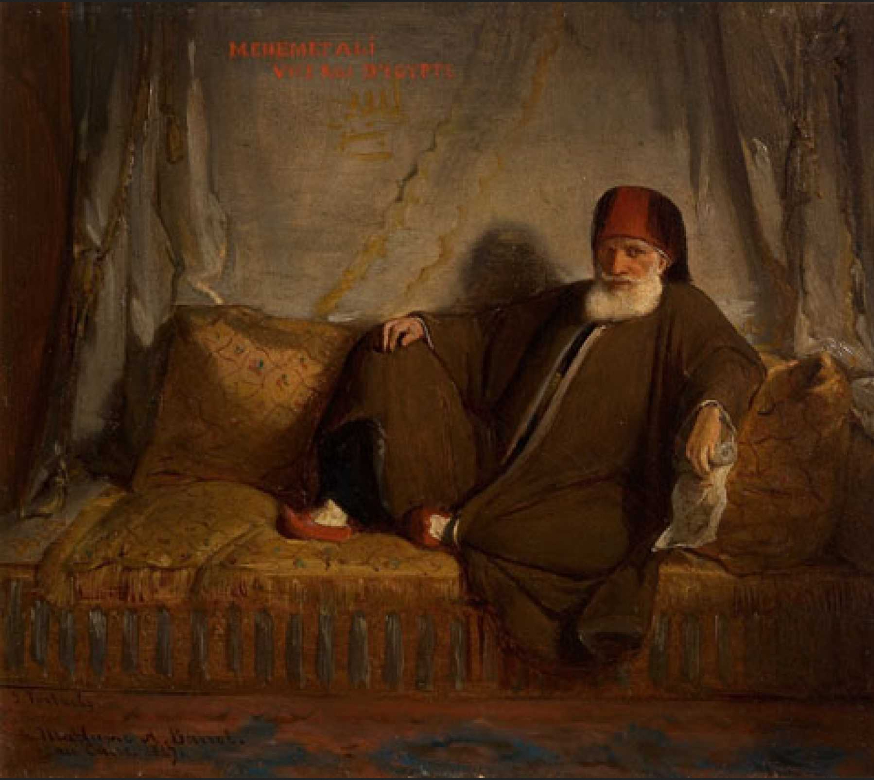
Muhammad Ali by Jean-François Portaels, 1847

In practice, Muhammad Ali's land reform amounted to a monopoly on trade in Egypt. He required all producers to sell their goods to the state. The state in turn resold Egyptian goods, within Egypt and to foreign markets, and retained the surplus. The practice proved very profitable for Egypt with the cultivation of long staple cotton, a new cash crop. To help improve production, he expanded the land used for agriculture and overhauled the irrigation system, largely completed by the corvée, or forced peasant labor. The new-found profits also extended down to the individual farmers, as the average wage increased fourfold.

In addition to bolstering the agricultural sector, Muhammad Ali built an industrial base for Egypt. His motivation for doing so was primarily an effort to build a modern military. Consequently, he focused on weapons production. Factories based in Cairo produced muskets and cannons. With a shipyard he built in Alexandria, he began construction of a navy. By the end of the 1830s, Egypt's war industries had constructed nine 100-gun warships and were turning out 1,600 muskets a month.

However, the industrial innovations were not limited to weapons production. Muhammad Ali established a textile industry in an effort to compete with European industries and produce greater revenues for Egypt. While the textile industry was not successful, the entire endeavour employed tens of thousands of Egyptians. Muhammad Ali used contracts called concessions to build cheap infrastructure – dams and railroads – whereby foreign European companies would raise capital, build projects, and collect most of the operating revenue but would provide Ali's government with a portion of that revenue. Ali also granted Barthélemy Prosper Enfantin permission to build technical schools modeled after the Ecole Polytechnique. Additionally, by hiring European managers, he was able to introduce industrial training to the Egyptian population. To staff his new industries, Muhammad Ali employed a corvée labor system. The peasantry objected to these conscriptions and many ran away from their villages to avoid being taken, sometimes fleeing as far away as Syria. A number of them maimed themselves so as to be unsuitable for combat: common ways of self-maiming were blinding an eye with rat poison and cutting off a finger of the right hand, so as to be unable to fire a rifle.

Beyond building a functioning, industrial economy, Muhammad Ali also made an effort to train a professional military and bureaucracy. He sent promising citizens to Europe to study. Again the driving impulse behind the effort was to build a European-style army. Students were sent to study European languages, primarily French, so they could in turn translate military manuals into Arabic. He then used both educated Egyptians and imported European experts to establish schools and hospitals in Egypt. European education also provided talented Egyptians with a means of social mobility.

A by-product of Muhammad Ali's training program was the establishment of a professional bureaucracy. Establishing an efficient central bureaucracy was an essential prerequisite for the success of Muhammad Ali's other reforms. In the process of destroying the Mamluks, the Wāli had to fill the governmental roles that the Mamluks had previously filled. In doing so, Muhammad Ali kept all central authority for himself. He partitioned Egypt into ten provinces responsible for collecting taxes and maintaining order. Muhammad Ali installed his sons in most key positions; however, his reforms did offer Egyptians opportunities beyond agriculture and industry.

A 2015 study found that Ali's economic policies had a positive impact on industrialization in Egypt.

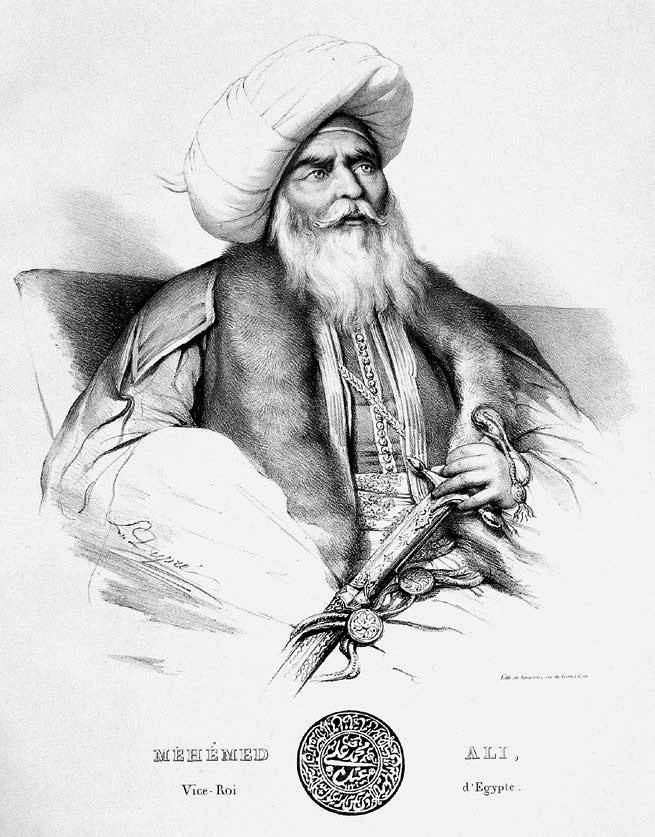
Muhammad Ali of Egypt, drawn by Louis Dupré.

== Law under Muhammad Ali ==
The purpose of the law was to represent Muhammad Ali in his absence. Muhammad Ali's initial focus was on reforming the criminal law, passing his first penal legislation in 1829. By this time, Muhammad Ali was already moving towards an establishment of an independent state, which he first expressed in 1830, by creating a state of "law and order", where Christians within Egypt can be safe, which was a way Muhammad Ali was able to pull influence from Europe. He started gradually reforming the government in a way that increased his influence and reduced that of the Sultan. He implemented a police force (principally in Cairo and Alexandria) that combined public order and prosecutorial functions. Strict Shari'a rules of evidence were relaxed, and modern evidence, particularly autopsy reports, became increasingly important in investigations and trials.

== Hakimas and the school of medicine for women ==
In 1832, Muhammad Ali allowed Antoine Clot, known as "Clot Bey" in Egypt, to establish a School of Medicine for women. Clot-Bey had been invited in 1827 by Muhammad Ali to found the Qasral-'Ayni School of Medicine at the Army hospital of Abou Zabel which later transferred to Cairo. The Army Medical School had a difficult beginning with religious officials against dissection of corpses for anatomy lessons.

The medical school for women would produce hakimas, "doctoress", to treat women and children. French women adherents of the Saint-Simonian social reform movement were living in Egypt during 1833–36 and studied or provided medical care under Clot Bey's direction. French sage-femme (midwife) Suzanne Voilquin writes of assisting during the cholera epidemic of 1834. Several of the French women contracted cholera and died.

Ali's military and economic goals required a healthy army and population from which young boys could be conscripted. Venereal diseases, especially syphilis, were common among soldiers and smallpox outbreaks led to high childhood mortality rates. Clot Bey argued that female-provided health care for women and children was crucial to maintain a healthy population. He believed that the untrained local dayas (midwives) were unable to provide appropriate care and under Egyptian law, male doctors could not treat women. Clot Bey's solution was a school to train female doctors.

The school of medicine for women followed a French model. The first two years of training provided Arabic literacy in order to communicate with patients. The following four included training in: obstetrics, pre- and post-natal care, dressing wounds, cauterization, vaccination, scarification, cupping, application of leeches, identification/preparation of common medicines. Students were provided housing, food, clothes and a monthly allowance from the state.

Graduates served at the Civil Hospital in Cairo or at health centres throughout Egypt. Some stayed at the school to serve as instructors. Marriages were arranged by the state to male doctors. Once married, hakimas were given the title of Effendi, the rank of second lieutenant, and a monthly salary of 250 piasters.

Licensed hakimas treated women and children, providing vaccinations and delivering children. They served a fundamental role in reducing the incidence of smallpox during the 19th century by vaccinating approximately 600 children a month in the Civil Hospital. They checked and treated women, mainly prostitutes, for venereal diseases. Another important task was the "forensic examination" of women. In this respect, hakimas operated in a legal setting. Their examination was used as evidence in cases involving unnatural death, suspected premarital loss of virginity, or miscarriage.

Although one task of the hakimas was overseeing childbirth, the majority of the population continued to use the dayas. Hakimas performed almost no deliveries and often were only called upon during difficult deliveries. However, dayas were required to have a certificate to perform deliveries, which could only be obtained from hakimas. They were also expected to report statistics on births to the hakimas.

A significant issue was recruitment of students. Egyptian culture at the time opposed the education of women. Therefore, the first students at the medical school were young slave girls. Slaves continued to be recruited through slave auctions as well as orphans from hospices. Despite the modest success of the school and its graduates, increasing enrolment remained a consistent problem, though the limit of 60 students was reached in 1846.

Contemporary and modern historians have viewed the creation of a school of medicine for women and the position of hakima as an example of modernization and reform for women under Muhammad Ali. Khaled Fahmy argues against this view. Fahmy states that, because the reasons for the creation of the school are primarily for the maintenance of a healthy army, the school was not a sign of reform but Ali furthering his military goals. For example, their treatment of venereal diseases was intended to curb its incidence among soldiers and smallpox vaccinations increased the pool of potential soldiers by reducing childhood mortality rate. Furthermore, the hakimas allowed for increased state control over social life. This is observed in the use of hakimas to collect statistics on childbirth, either personally or through dayas, as well as in the cases where a hakima was used to examine a woman.

== Role in the Arabic literary renaissance ==
In the 1820s, Muhammad Ali sent the first educational "mission" of Egyptian students to Europe. This contact resulted in literature that is considered the dawn of the Arabic literary renaissance, known as the Nahda.

To support the modernization of industry and the military, Muhammad Ali set up a number of schools in various fields where French texts were studied. Rifa'a al-Tahtawi supervised translations from French to Arabic on topics ranging from sociology and history to military technology. In 1819/21, his government founded the first indigenous press in the Arab World, the Bulaq Press. The Bulaq press published the official gazette of Muhammad Ali's government.

Among his personal interests was the accumulation and breeding of Arabian horses. In horses obtained as taxes and tribute, Muhammad Ali recognized the unique characteristics and careful attention to bloodlines of the horses bred by the Bedouin, particularly by the Anazeh in Syria and those bred in the Nejd. While his immediate successor had minimal interest in the horse breeding program, his grandson, who became Abbas I shared this interest and further built upon his work.

== Military campaigns ==
The flag of Muhammad Ali

Though Muhammad Ali's chief aim was to establish a European-style military, and carve out a personal empire, he waged war initially on behalf of the Ottoman Sultan, Mahmud II, in Arabia and Greece, although he later came into open conflict with the Ottoman Empire. He used several new strategies to ensure the success of his new military. First new recruits were isolated from the environment they were used to. They began housing soldiers in barracks, leadership enforced a strict regime of surveillance, roll call was done several times a day, and corporal punishment used to ensure the new fighting force grew to become a strong disciplined military. The army often used the bastinado and the whip to control and punish the soldiers. Muhammad not only wanted his soldiers to be disciplined, but he also created many military codes to regulate the definitions of crime and punishment, this helped to create blind obedience to the laws. A large part of Ali's goal of a European-style military was through the creation of new labelling and organizational systems to identify soldiers, distinguish officers from enlisted men, structure units, and properly distribute salaries. Soldiers were given a unique number that identified their unit and their role within it, and officers were expected to use lists with these numbers to keep a close watch on the men and ensure every man performed his clearly assigned duty. This was particularly useful in identifying deserters who often fled in the chaos of massed movement, such as during forced marches or relocation to a new encampment. The soldiers were placed under strict surveillance in the barracks. In order to accomplish this Muhammad Ali relied on the Bedouins to guard the troops that were sent to the training camps. Despite being hired to control the troops the Bedouins were actually a menace to the government who often had to use the army to control the Bedouins. In order to combat this the government slowly switched from using Bedouins to guard the soldiers and to capture deserters and instead attempted to set up the expectation of internment from the beginning of the soldiers stay at the training camps in order to deter them from deserting the military in the first place.

=== Arabian campaign ===
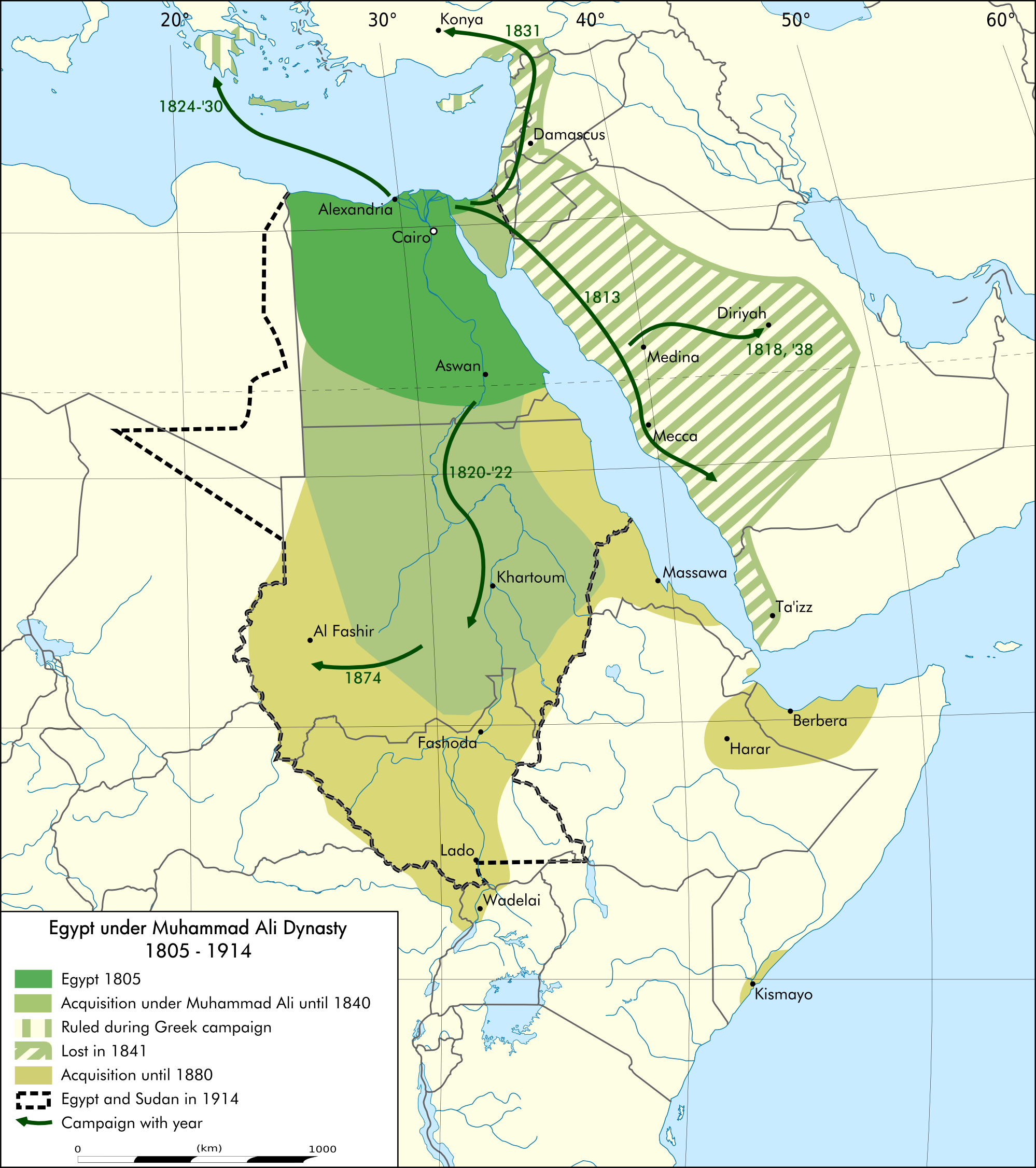
Map of Egypt under Muhammad Ali Dynasty

Muhammad Ali's first military campaign was an expedition into the Arabian Peninsula. The holy cities of Mecca, and Medina had been captured by the House of Saud, who had recently embraced a Wahabi interpretation of Islam. Armed with their newfound religious zeal, the Saudis began conquering parts of Arabia. This culminated in the capture of the Hejaz region by 1805.

With the main Ottoman army tied up in Europe, Mahmud II turned to Muhammad Ali to recapture the Arabian territories. Muhammad Ali in turn appointed his son, Tusun, to lead a military expedition in 1811. The campaign was initially turned back in Arabia; however, a second attack was launched in 1812 that succeeded in recapturing Hejaz.

While the campaign was successful, the power of the Saudis was not broken. They continued to harass Ottoman and Egyptian forces from the central Nejd region of the Peninsula. Consequently, Muhammad Ali dispatched another of his sons, Ibrahim, at the head of another army to finally rout the Saudis. After a two-year campaign, the Saudis were crushed and most of the Saudi family was captured. He placed his nephew Ahmed Yeghen Pasha as governor of Mecca and Jeddah. The family leader, Abdullah ibn Saud, was sent to Constantinople, and executed.

=== Conquest of Sudan ===
Muhammad Ali next turned his attention to military campaigns independent of the Porte, beginning with the Sudan which he viewed as a valuable additional resource of territory, gold, and slaves. The Sudan at the time had no real central authority, as since the 18th century many petty kingdoms and tribal sheikhdoms had seceded from the declining Sultanate of Sennar, fighting each other with Medieval weaponry. In 1820 Muhammad Ali dispatched an army of 5,000 troops commanded by his third son, Ismail, and Abidin Bey, south into Sudan with the intent of conquering the territory and subjugating it to his authority. Ali's troops made headway into Sudan in 1821, but met with fierce resistance by the Shaigiya. Ultimately, the superiority of the Egyptian troops and firearms ensured the defeat of the Shaigiya and the subsequent conquest of the Sudan. Ali now had an outpost from which he could expand to the source of the Nile in Ethiopia, and Uganda. His administration captured slaves from the Nuba Mountains, and west and south Sudan, all incorporated into a foot regiment known as the Gihadiya (pronounced Jihadiya in non-Egyptian Arabic) which were composed of the recently defeated Shaigiya who now took service under the invaders in exchange for keeping their domains. Ali's reign in Sudan, and that of his immediate successors, is remembered in Sudan as brutal and heavy-handed, contributing to the popular independence struggle of the self-proclaimed Mahdi, Muhammad Ahmad, in 1881.

=== Greek rebellion ===
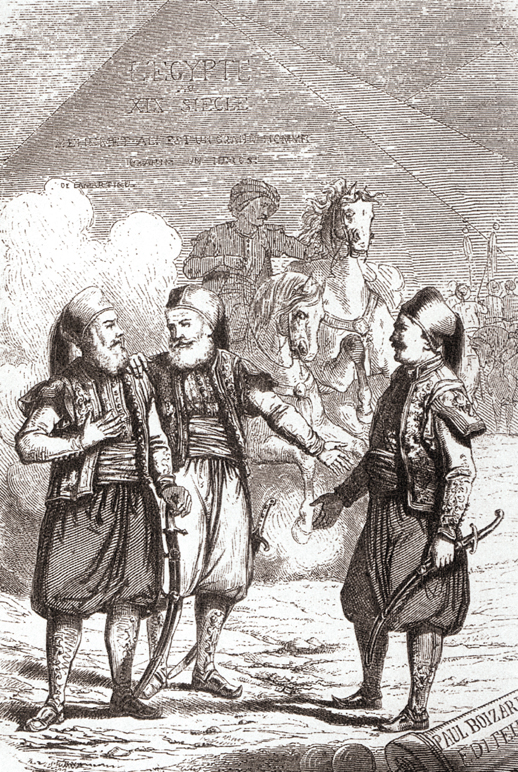
Muhammad Ali Pasha with his son, Ibrahim, and Soliman Pasha al-Faransawi.

While Muhammad Ali was expanding his authority into Africa, the Ottoman Empire was being challenged by ethnic rebellions in its European territories. The rebellion in the Greek provinces of the Ottoman Empire began in 1821. The Ottoman army proved ineffectual in its attempts to put down the revolt as ethnic violence spread as far as Constantinople. With his own army proving ineffective, Sultan Mahmud II offered Muhammad Ali the island of Crete in exchange for his support in putting down the revolt.

Muhammad Ali sent 16,000 soldiers, 100 transports, and 63 escort vessels under command of his son, Ibrahim Pasha. After Ibrahim sustained successive defeats in Greece (see Ottoman–Egyptian invasion of Mani) Britain, France, and Russia intervened to aid the Greek revolution as a check on Ibrahim's expansionist agenda which threatened the balance of power in the East Mediterranean. On 20 October 1827 at the Battle of Navarino, while under the command of Muharram Bey, the Ottoman representative, the entire Egyptian navy was sunk by the European Allied fleet, under the command of Admiral Edward Codrington. If the Porte was not in the least prepared for this confrontation, Muhammad Ali was even less prepared for the loss of his highly competent, expensively assembled and maintained navy. With its fleet essentially destroyed, Egypt had no way to support its forces in Greece and was forced to withdraw. Ultimately the campaign cost Muhammad Ali his navy and yielded no tangible gains.

=== War against the sultan ===
In compensation for his loss at Navarino, Muhammad Ali asked the Porte for the territory of Syria. The Ottomans were indifferent to the request; the Sultan himself asked blandly what would happen if Syria was given over and Muhammad Ali later deposed. But Muhammad Ali was no longer willing to tolerate Ottoman indifference. To compensate for his and Egypt's losses, the wheels for the conquest of Syria were set in motion.

Like other rulers of Egypt before him, Ali desired to control Bilad al-Sham (the Levant), both for its strategic value and for its rich natural resources; nor was this a sudden, vindictive decision on the part of Ali since he had harboured this goal since his early years as Egypt's unofficial ruler. For not only had Syria abundant natural resources, it also had a thriving international trading community with well-developed markets throughout the Levant; in addition, it would be a captive market for the goods now being produced in Egypt. Yet perhaps most of all, Syria was desirable as a buffer state between Egypt and the Ottoman Sultan.

A new fleet was built, a new army was raised and on 31 October 1831, under Ibrahim Pasha, the Egyptian invasion of Syria initiated the First Turko-Egyptian War. For the sake of appearance on the world stage, a pretext for the invasion was vital. Ultimately, the excuse for the expedition was a quarrel with Abdullah Pasha of Acre. The Wāli alleged that 6,000 fellahin had fled to Acre to escape the draft, corvée, and taxes, and he wanted them back. (See also: 1834 Arab revolt in Palestine)

The Egyptians overran most of Syria and its hinterland with ease. The strongest and only really significant resistance was put up at the port city of Acre. The Egyptian force eventually captured the city after a six-month siege, which lasted from 3 November 1831 to 27 May 1832. Unrest on the Egyptian home front increased dramatically during the course of the siege. Ali was forced to squeeze Egypt more and more in order to support his campaign and his people resented the increased burden.

After the fall of Acre, the Egyptian army marched north into Anatolia. At the Battle of Konya (21 December 1832), Ibrahim Pasha soundly defeated the Ottoman army led by the sadr azam Grand Vizier Reshid Pasha. There were now no military obstacles between Ibrahim's forces and Constantinople itself.

Through the course of the campaign, Muhammad Ali paid particular focus to the European powers. Fearing another intervention that would reverse all his gains, he proceeded slowly and cautiously. For example, Muhammad Ali continued the practice of using the sultan's name at Friday prayers in the newly captured territories and continued to circulate Ottoman coins instead of issuing new ones bearing his likeness. So long as Muhammad Ali's march did not threaten to cause the complete collapse of the Ottoman state, the powers in Europe remained as passive observers.

Despite this show, Muhammad Ali's goal was now to remove the current Ottoman Sultan Mahmud II and replace him with the sultan's son, the infant Abdülmecid. This possibility so alarmed Mahmud II that he accepted Russia's offer of military aid resulting in the Treaty of Hünkâr İskelesi. Russia's gain dismayed the British and French governments, resulting in their direct intervention. From this position, the European powers brokered a negotiated solution in May 1833 known as the Convention of Kutahya. The terms of the peace were that Ali would withdraw his forces from Anatolia and receive the territories of Crete (then known as Candia) and the Hijaz as compensation, and Ibrahim Pasha would be appointed Wāli of Syria. The peace agreement fell short, however, of granting Muhammad Ali an independent kingdom for himself, leaving him wanting.

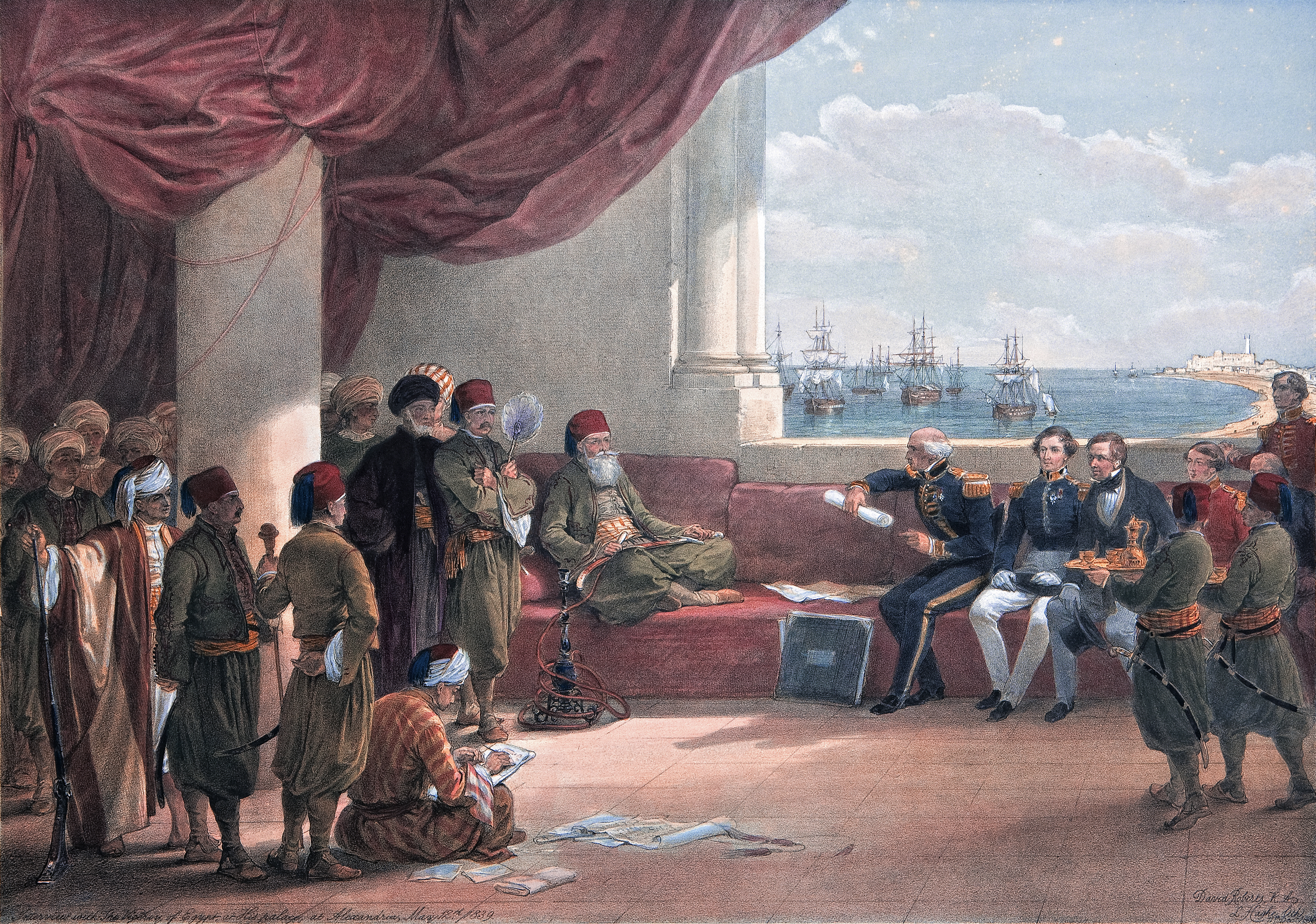
Interview with Mehmet Ali in his Palace at Alexandria (1839), with Patrick Campbell in the centre. After David Roberts, in The Holy Land, Syria, Idumea, Arabia, Egypt, and Nubia

Sensing that Muhammad Ali was not content with his gains, the sultan attempted to pre-empt further action against the Ottoman Empire by offering him hereditary rule in Egypt and Arabia if he withdrew from Syria and Crete and renounced any desire for full independence. Muhammad Ali rejected the offer, knowing that Mahmud could not force the Egyptian presence from Syria and Crete.

On 25 May 1838, Muhammad Ali informed Britain, and France that he intended to declare independence from the Ottoman Empire. This action was contrary to the desire of the European powers to maintain the status quo within the Ottoman Empire. With Muhammad Ali's intentions clear, the European powers, particularly Russia, attempted to moderate the situation and prevent conflict. Within the Empire, however, both sides were gearing for war. Ibrahim already had a sizable force in Syria. In Constantinople, the Ottoman commander, Hafiz Pasha, assured the Sultan that he could defeat the Egyptian army.

When Mahmud II ordered his forces to advance on the Syrian frontier, Ibrahim attacked and destroyed them at the Battle of Nezib (24 June 1839) near Urfa. In an echo of the Battle of Konya, Constantinople was again left vulnerable to Ali's forces. A further blow to the Ottomans was the defection of their fleet to Muhammad Ali. Mahmud II died almost immediately after the battle took place and was succeeded by sixteen-year-old Abdülmecid. At this point, Ali and Ibrahim began to argue about which course to follow; Ibrahim favoured conquering the Ottoman capital and demanding the imperial seat while Muhammad Ali was inclined simply to demand numerous concessions of territory and political autonomy for himself and his family.

At this point, the European powers again intervened (see Oriental Crisis of 1840). On 15 July 1840, the British government, which had negotiated with Austria, Prussia, and Russia to sign the Convention of London, offered Muhammad Ali hereditary rule of Egypt as part of the Ottoman Empire if he withdrew from the Syrian hinterland and the coastal regions of Mount Lebanon. Muhammad Ali hesitated, believing he had support from France. His hesitation proved costly. France eventually backed down as King Louis-Philippe did not want his country to find itself involved and isolated in a war against the other powers, especially at a time when he also had to deal with the Rhine crisis. British naval forces were ordered to sail to Syria and Alexandria. In the face of such displays of European military might, Muhammad Ali acquiesced.

After the British and Austrian navies established a naval blockade over the Nile Delta coastline and launched an attack on Egyptian controlled Acre, Muhammad Ali agreed to the terms of the Convention on 27 November 1840. These terms included renouncing his claims over Crete, and Hijaz, downsizing his navy, and reducing his standing army to 18,000 men, provided that he and his descendants would enjoy hereditary rule over Egypt and Sudan: an unheard-of status for an Ottoman governor.

== Final years ==
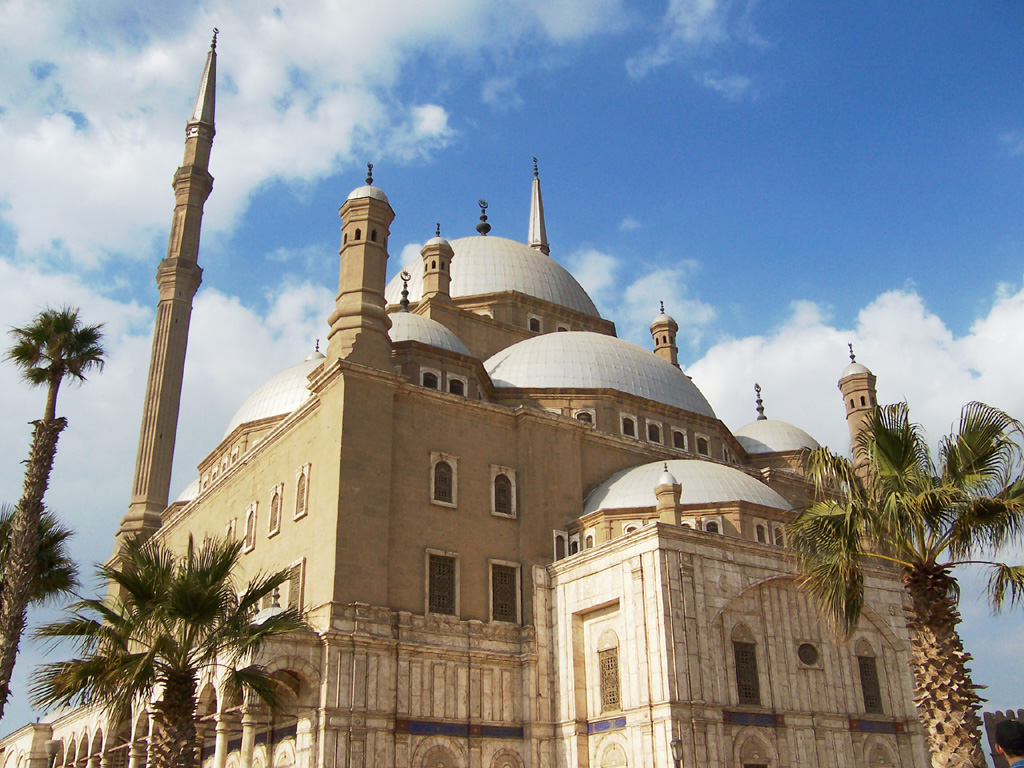
The Mosque of Muhammad Ali in Cairo, Egypt

After 1843, fast on the heels of the Syrian debacle, and the Treaty of Balta Liman, which forced the Egyptian government to tear down its import barriers and to give up its monopolies, Muhammad Ali's mind became increasingly clouded and tended towards paranoia. Whether it was genuine senility or the effects of the silver nitrate he had been given years before to treat an attack of dysentery remains a subject of debate.

In 1844 the tax receipts were in, and Sherif Pasha, the head of the diwan al-maliyya (financial ministry), was too fearful for his life to tell Ali the news that Egyptian debt now stood at 80 million francs (£2,400,000). Tax arrears came to 14,081,500 piastres (Note: A piastre is forty paras. A para is the smallest Egyptian silver coin. In this instance, a piastre can be viewed as approximately 40% of a British pound sterling.) out of a total estimated tax of 75,227,500 pts. Timidly he approached Ibrahim Pasha with these facts, and together came up with a report and a plan. Anticipating his father's initial reaction, Ibrahim arranged for Muhammad Ali's favourite daughter to break the news. It did little, if any, good. The resulting rage was far beyond what had been expected, and it took six full days for a tenuous peace to take hold.

In 1846, while Ibrahim, progressively crippled by rheumatic pains and tuberculosis (he was beginning to cough up blood), was sent to Italy to take the waters, Muhammad Ali travelled to Constantinople. There he approached the Sultan, expressed his fears, and made his peace, explaining: "[My son] Ibrahim is old and sick, [my grandson] Abbas is indolent (happa), and then children will rule Egypt. How will they keep Egypt?" After he secured hereditary rule for his family, the Wāli ruled until 1848, when senility made further governance by him impossible.

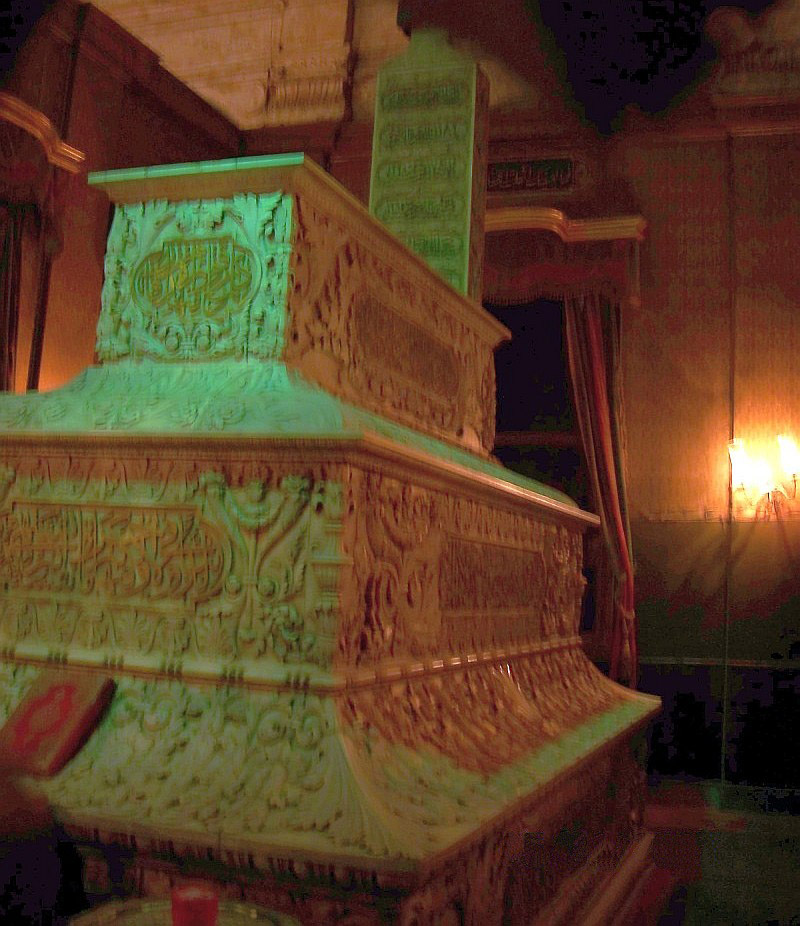
Tomb of Muhammad Ali in Alabaster Mosque in Cairo

It soon came to the point where his son and heir, the mortally ailing Ibrahim, had no choice but to travel to Constantinople and request that the Sultan recognize him ruler of Egypt and Sudan even though his father was still alive. However, on the ship returning home, Ibrahim, gripped by fever and guilt, succumbed to seizures and hallucinations. He survived the journey but within six months was dead. He was succeeded by his nephew (Tosun's son) Abbas I.

By this time Muhammad Ali had become so ill and senile that he was not informed of his son's death, instead he was told that his son had conquered Crete, by his closest advisors. Lingering a few months more, Muhammad Ali died at Ras el-Tin Palace in Alexandria on 2 August 1849, and ultimately was buried in the imposing mosque he had commissioned in the Cairo Citadel.

But the immediate reaction to his death was noticeably low-profile, thanks in no small part to the contempt the new Wāli Abbas Pasha had always felt towards his grandfather.

Eyewitness British consul John Murray wrote:

... the ceremonial of the funeral was a most meagre, miserable affair; the [diplomatic] Consular was not invited to attend, and neither the shops nor the Public offices were closed – in short, a general impression prevails that Abbas Pasha has shown a culpable lack of respect for the memory of his illustrious grandfather, in allowing his obsequies to be conducted in so paltry a manner, and in neglecting to attend them in person.

...[the] attachment and veneration of all classes in Egypt for the name of Muhammad Ali are prouder obsequies than any of which it was in power of his successor to confer. The old inhabitants remember and talk of the chaos and anarchy from which he rescued this country; the younger compare his energetic rule with the capricious, vacillating government of his successor; all classes whether Turk, or Arab, not only feel, but do not hesitate to say openly that the prosperity of Egypt has died with Muhammad Ali...In truth my Lord, it cannot be denied, that Muhammad Ali, notwithstanding all his faults was a great man.

== Legacy ==
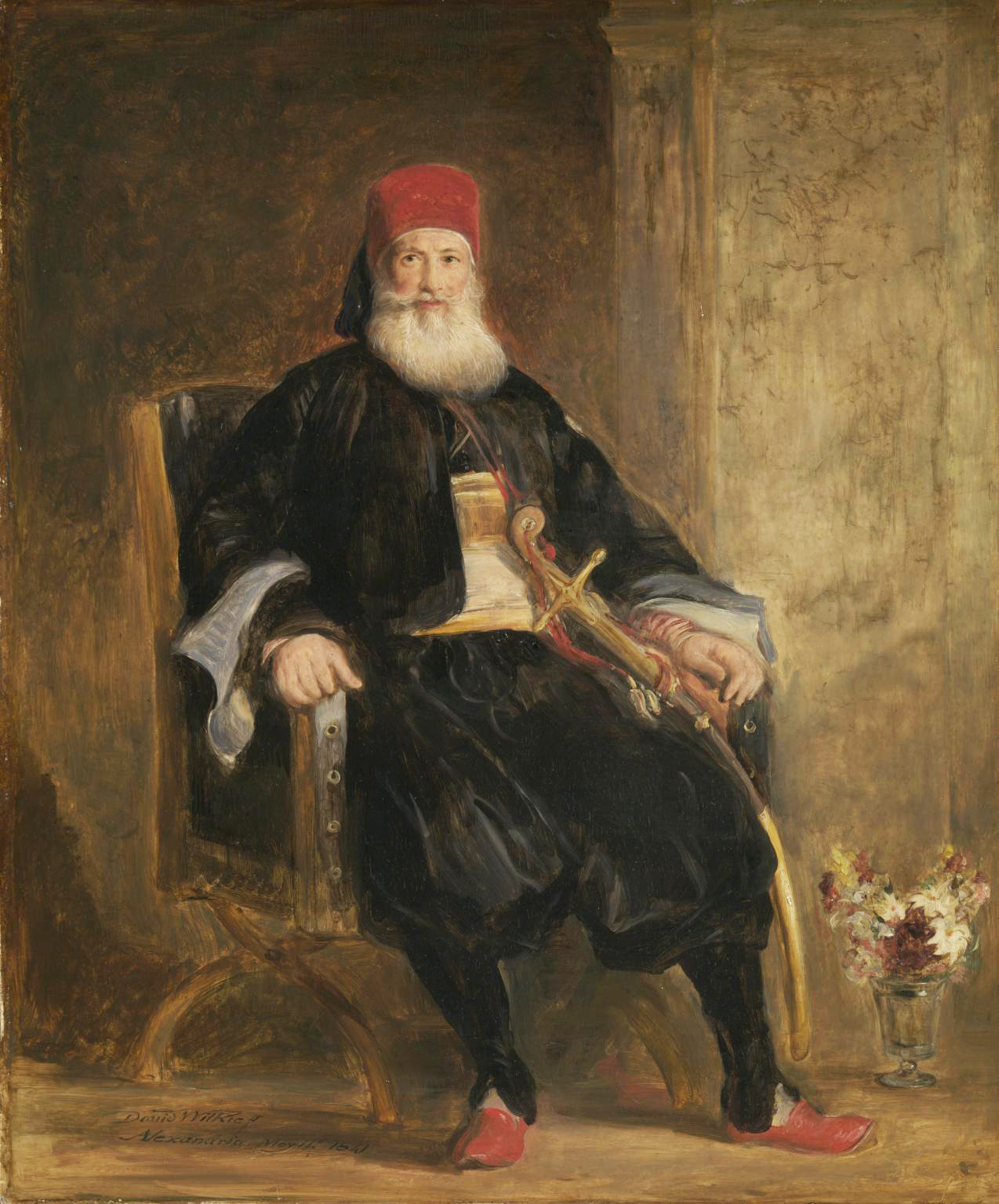
Portrait of Muhammad Ali of Egypt by David Wilkie (1841).

The prevailing historical view of Muhammad Ali is as the "Father of Modern Egypt", being the first ruler since the Ottoman conquest in 1517 to permanently divest the Porte of its power in Egypt. While failing to achieve formal independence for Egypt during his lifetime, he was successful in laying the foundation for a modern Egyptian state. In the process of building an army to defend and expand his realm, he built a central bureaucracy, an educational system that allowed social mobility, and an economic base that included an agricultural cash crop, cotton, and military-based manufacturing. His efforts established his progeny as the rulers of Egypt and Sudan for nearly 150 years and rendered Egypt a de facto independent state.

Others, however, view him not as a builder but rather as a conqueror. He was of Albanian origin rather than Egyptian, and, throughout his reign, Ottoman Turkish was the official language of his court rather than Arabic. Some argue that he exploited Egyptian manpower and resources for his own personal ends, not Egyptian national ones, with the manpower requirements that he placed on Egyptians being particularly onerous. Taken together in this light, Muhammad Ali is cast by some as another in a long line of foreign conquerors dating back to the Persian occupation in 525 B.C. This view, however, is at odds with the majority opinion of Egyptian, and other Arab historians, and Egyptian public opinion.

Much of the historical debate regarding Muhammad Ali reflects the simultaneous political struggles which occurred in Egypt during the 20th century. Fuad I of Egypt in the 1930s sponsored the collection, arrangement, and translation of the available historical documents relating to his predecessors, which became the Royal Archives of Egypt. These Royal Archives represented the primary and, in the case of some important works, the only source of information for Egyptian history until the sharia court records became available in the 1970s. Fuad's portrayal of Muhammad Ali as a nationalist and benevolent monarch therefore heavily influenced the historical debate. Later, Nasser and his revolutionary republican regime promoted an alternative narrative which portrayed Muhammad Ali as the nationalist founder of modern Egypt but also an ambitious monarch with little regard for his people whose policies ultimately benefited himself and his dynasty at the expense of Egypt.

== See also ==
- History of Egypt under the Muhammad Ali dynasty
- Khedive, title Muhammad Ali gave himself
- Lists of rulers of Egypt
- Muhammad Ali dynasty
- Muhammad Ali's seizure of power
- Ottoman Egypt

== Notes ==
Muhammad Ali of Egypt Muhammad Ali Dynasty Born: 4 March 1769 Died: 2 August 1849
Preceded by Hurshid Ahmed Pasha as Ottoman Governor of Egypt	Wāli of Egypt and Sudan; 1805–1848	Succeeded by Ibrahim Pasha
