= Battle of Byssel =

Ottoman battle in Hejaz, 19th century

- Part of the Ottoman-Wahhabi war
| Date | January 1815 |
| Location | Byssel, between Taif and Kolakh, Hejaz (Western Arabia) |
| Result | Ottoman-Egyptian victory |

Belligerents
| Ottoman Empire; Eyalet of Egypt | Emirate of Diriyah; Zahran tribe |

Commanders and leaders
| Muhammad Ali Pasha; Hassan Pasha; Abidin Bey; Mahou Bey; Ahmad Bonaparte; Topous Oglou; Sheriff Rajeh | Abdallah I Faisal bin Saud; Tami bin Shuaib; Bakrosh bin A'llas; Ibn Melha; Ibn Ketnan; Ibn Khorshan; Ibn Shokban; Ibn Dahman; Ibn Katamel; Bakhrosh ibn A'llas (executed); Ghaliyya Al Bogammiah |

Strength
| 4,000 men (20,000 according to Muhammad Ali of Egypt) | 20,000–25,000 men 5,000 camels |

Casualties and losses
| 400–500 killed | 5,000 killed 300 prisoners (50 executed) |

The Battle of Byssel was the last major military engagement in the Second Campaign of the Ottoman–Wahhabi war. It was fought between Ottoman-Egyptian forces and Abdullah bin Saud's Wahhabi and Bedouin tribal forces in Byssel. The Ottomans decisivley won the battle and broke Abdullah bin Saud's power.

== Background ==
After the Battle of Medina in 1812, the Ottomans began suffering military defeats in Hinakiyah, Turubah, Qunfudhah, and Bahah. Soon after their recent defeat in Al-Bahah, Muhammad Ali Pasha set Turubah as his next objective. He encouraged his troops that the walls of Turubah wouldn't last long and no soldier would have to scale them.

The Saudi commander, Bakhrosh bin A'llas, sent a taunting letter to Muhammad Ali Pasha, informing him that he would lose with his troops and return to Egypt. To encourage his army, he captured 13 Bedouins and claimed they were Saudi robbers, while in reality they headed to Jeddah to purchase supplies. All of them were executed, although one of them managed to escape, but he was chased by a Turkish cavalryman and killed.

== Prelude ==
Everything was now prepared for the expedition. Ahmad Bonaparte left Mecca and headed towards Kolakh (south of Taif, 70 kilometers) on December 15, 1814. Muhammad Ali intended to follow him, but on December 24, he received a report that a strong Saudi force was seen in Al Qunfudhah and headed towards Jeddah. Bedouins were dispatched to obtain information, and at Jeddah, there was disorder as capturing Jeddah would cut off communication lines with Mecca, and water in Jeddah was scarce.

A few days later, news arrived that Bakhrosh had conducted a raid against the Nasira tribes, the allies of the Pasha, and attacked a fort that was the headquarters of Abidin Bey and sacked it. Turubah received news of the upcoming Ottoman attack and made preparations, and reinforcements were coming from all quarters to defend the town. The Turubah garrison commander, Faisal ibn Saud, brother of Abdullah bin Saud Al Saud, recruited his forces in Hejaz, many of whom came from 'Asir, Zahran, and Ghamd led by Tami bin Shu'aib.

== Battle ==
On January 7, 1815, Muhammad Ali marched from Mecca with all his troops and camels that he could muster and proceeded towards Kolakh, where Hassan Pasha, Abidin Bey, Mahou Bey, Ahmad Bonaparte, Topous Oglou, and Sherif Rajeh, with sufficient provisions for 60 days, had a force of 4,000 men. They were informed that Saudis had stopped at Byssel while also attacking the Otaibah tribe, the allies of the Ottomans. Muhammad Ali then quickly marched there and dispatched Sheriff Rajeh with his Bedouin and Libyan soldiers to support them. He arrived in Byssel on Thursday. The Saudi forces had a force of 20,000 or 25,000, and they had a small number of cavalry since the mountains nearby were poor in horses. They were accompanied by 5,000 camels but wanted artillery of every type. The Saudis were led by Faisal bin Saud, Tami bin Shuaib, Bakrosh bin A'llas, Ibn Melha, Ibn Ketnan, Ibn Khorshan, Ibn Shokban, Ibn Dahman, and Ibn Katamel.

When Muhammad Ali Pasha arrived, the Saudis occupied a strong position in the center of the Ottoman lines; they remained in their mountains and repulsed an attack on the valley when the Ottomans attempted to plant one of their artillery pieces. The whole Thursday was full of fruitless attempts made by the Ottoman cavalry, and in their last attack they lost around 20 men to the Saudi cavalry. Although few people were killed, the Ottomans began to despair of success. Several Ottoman soldiers and Bedouins deserted the army and headed towards Mecca, where they would spread news of the defeat, which caused panic, and several Turkish soldiers and merchants began escaping.

Muhammad Ali Pasha had clearly seen that as long as the Saudis stuck to the mountains, he had no chance of winning. He then sent a message during the night to Kolakh for reinforcements and dispatched a force of 2,000 infantry to take a position on the flank of the Saudis. The next morning, he renewed the attack but was repulsed. He then commanded his officers to advance with their columns closer to the enemy, and after firing their guns, they would pretend to retreat disorderly. The Saudis saw them retreating, so they left their positions in the mountains. He rallied his forces and faced them.

The Ottomans compelled the Saudis to retreat, and upon seeing this, Muhammad Ali Pasha ordered a prize for anyone who would bring a head of the enemy, and in a few hours they brought him 5,000 heads. Their whole baggage and most of their camels became loot for the Ottomans, and about 300 Saudi prisoners were captured. The Ottomans lost between 400 and 500 men.

== Aftermath ==
Messengers were immediately dispatched to Constantinople and Cairo news of the victory, Muhammad Ali Pasha had the 300 prisoners brought to him and executed 50 of them by impaling. This cruel act was condemned by Sheriff Rajeh, who complained to the Pasha to no avail.

Muhammad Ali continued with his success. Four days after the battle, he arrived in Turubah and the town quickly capitulated. His soldiers plundered a few houses and kidnapped some Arab women, but Muhammad Ali restored them to their families. The Ottomans then marched on Al Qunfudhah, Ranyah, and Beisha and captured them.

The Ottomans successfully invaded the territories of the Zahran tribes for the third time, and captured Bakhrosh bin A'llas. He was taken to Al Qunfudhah where he was executed. It wasn't long after that Abdullah bin Saud Al Saud offered a peace treaty to the Ottomans which they accepted.
