= Battle of Dhurma (1818) =

Battle and Massacre in Arabia during the Wahhabi War

- Part of the Ottoman–Wahhabi war's Najd Expedition
Date	January 1818
Location	Dhurma, Najd (Central Arabia)
Result	Ottoman–Egyptian victory

Belligerents
Ottoman Empire; Eyalet of Egypt	Emirate of Diriyah

Commanders and leaders
(Ottoman Empire) Ibrahim Pasha	Abdullah Ibn Saud

Strength
Unknown	~1,200 soldiers

Casualties and losses
~600+ soldiers killed	800+ soldiers killed 3,000 civilians expelled Unknown number of civilians killed

The Battle of Dhurma was a battle and massacre in the Third Campaign of the Ottoman–Wahhabi war during the Expedition to Najd. The Ottomans laid siege to Dhurma, and their troops intentionally killed many of those that surrendered.

== Battle ==
In January 1818, Ibrahim Pasha led Ottoman forces to the Dhurma fortress, a stronghold equipped with an abundance of both defenders and provisions. Upon arrival, Ibrahim Pasha meticulously surveyed the fortress before initiating the siege at its eastern flank. Despite Ottoman bombardments and assaults on the walls, the fierce battle that ensued concluding with the initial Ottoman attack being thwarted. Ibrahim Pasha tried to negotiate with the fortress' garrison, but was unsuccessful and his forces attacked again.

Ottoman cannons bombed the fortress walls relentlessly, reportedly firing 5,300 shots at the stronghold. Despite the strength of their renewed attack, they were decisively repulsed again, and incurred losses of 600 men. The garrison was undeterred by the initial attacks and even began reconstruction on damaged sections of the fortress walls. After his attacks from the east failed, Ibrahim Pasha subsequently attacked the fortress, under the leadership of Mut'ab bin 'Aafisan, from the south. After additional cannon bombardments and another assault, the Ottomans succeeded in seizing the fortress, infiltrating it from all sides. Street battles continued within the walls, which caused numerous additional Ottoman casualties. The battle resulted in the death of 800 of Saud's soldiers, with only 400 of 1,200 surviving.

== Massacre ==
Inside the fortress, the Ottomans conducted a ruthless campaign, targeting residents in both shops and houses. In a deceitful maneuver, after surrendering soldiers had their weapons confiscated only to be subsequently killed by Ottomans. The fortress endured widespread pillaging of money, weapons, cattle, clothing, and personal belongings and was rendered uninhabitable. Ibrahim Pasha seized control and captured 3,000 women and children, dispatching them to Diriyah.
