= Battle of Al Qunfudhah (1814) =

Ottoman battle in Hejaz, 19th century

- Part of the Ottoman-Wahhabi war
Date	March–early May 1814
Location	Al Qunfudhah, Hejaz (Western Arabia)
Result	Wahhabi victory

Belligerents
Ottoman Empire; Eyalet of Egypt	Emirate of Diriyah

Commanders and leaders
Muhammad Ali; Hussian Agha; Saym Oglu	Saud ibn Abdulaziz; Tami bin Shu'aib

Strength
1,500 men 40 ships	Garrison: 500 men Relief army: 8,000–10,000 men

Casualties and losses
Heavy	Unknown

The Battle of Al Qunfudhah in 1814 was a counterattack during the Second Campaign of the Ottoman–Wahhabi war. The Emirate of Diriyah fought to retake the city of Al Qunfudhah from the Ottoman Empire, which had recaptured the city in the prior month. The attack was successful and the city was retaken.

== Background ==
Since the Ottoman capture of Mecca and Medina in the First Campaign, the Ottomans began to suffer setbacks. In 1813 they lost Al Hinakiyah and twice were defeated in the Battles of Turubah. Egyptian Governor Muhammad Ali Pasha, who commanded the Second Campaign of the war, decided it was necessary to plan a diversion. He thought it would encourage his army and draw away Saud bin Abdulaziz's forces from their main attack on Al Qunfudah. However, Bedouin tribes of the Asir province to the south, helped Abdulaziz and the Wahhabis by skirmishing with the Ottoman troops in Hejaz.

== Battle ==
A naval expedition was launched with an army of 1,500 men and 40 ships filled with supplies and provisions, Hussain Agha and Saym Oglu were entrusted with the command of the expedition, they proceeded to Al Qunfudhah, a seaport city, and marched for seven days, the city was ruled by Asir tribe and was in the possession of Tami Bin Shu'aib, the leader of the Asir tribe, it had a small garrison of five hundred men, the capture of the city would open the way for the conquest of Yemen.

The Ottomans besieged the city and began bombarding the walls until the garrison surrendered in March 1814 without any fight; most of the inhabitants escaped, The city walls were fortified to defend against enemy attack but had no water supplies, and the nearest water wells were three hours away near the mountains, The Ottomans dispatched 150 Albanian troops to guard the wells; they remained in the city for one month until the Saudis launched a counter-attack led by Tami bin Shu'aib with a force of 8,000 to 10,000 men.

The Saudis first attacked the Albanian soldiers protecting the wells; some of them fought and the rest escaped to the town. without an attempt to defend the walls, panic struck the commanders, and they ordered the troops to retreat towards the ships. the Saudis entered the city and killed any soldiers and servant they met who could not escape into the ships; many were killed in the water next to the ships. The Ottoman commander then abandoned all who could not escape; the ships were badly supplied with water or provisions which caused many to die of thirst on their way to Jeddah.

The Saudis never found great booty; all that was left was their baggage and their guns, the only valuable loot captured was the horses; they captured around 400-500 horses, and it is said they captured around one thousand war tents.

== Sources ==
- John Lewis Burckhardt, Notes on the Bedouins and Wahábys, p. 374
- Othman bin Bishr, Glory in the History of Najd, p. 366
