= Al-Faqir Fort =

18th-century fort in modern-day Saudi Arabia

al-Faqir Fort
- قلعة الفقير
- Al-'Ula, Saudi Arabia
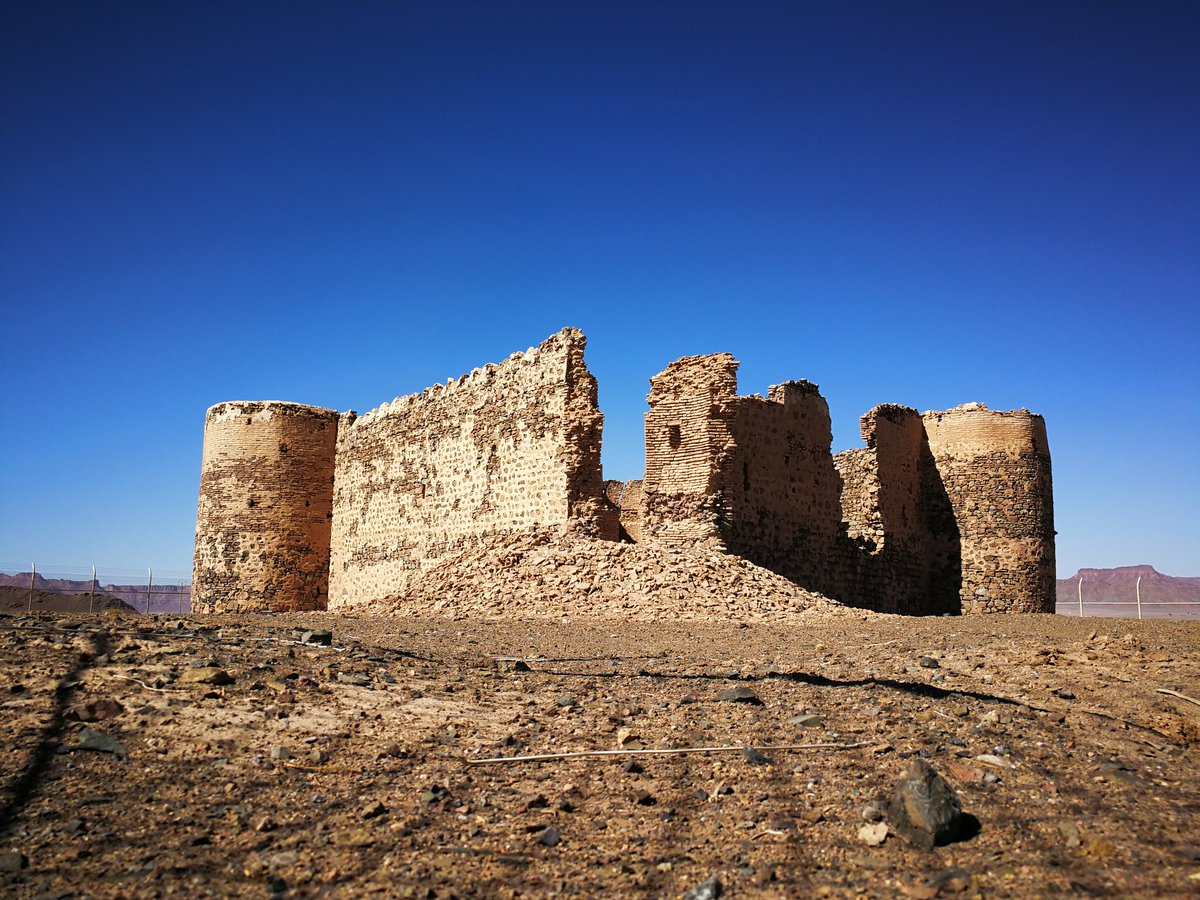
- The fort viewed from the southern portion

Site information
- Type: Fort
- Condition: Ruins

Site history
- Built: 18th century
- Built by: Ottoman dynasty
- Materials: stone and brick

Al-Faqir Fort (Arabic: قلعة الفقير) is an 18th-century fort situated in the Levantine pilgrimage route on a small hilltop in the southern portion of modern-day Al-'Ula, Saudi Arabia. The fort takes a squared form with round towers, three of which are standing while the southern one was completely destroyed. The fort occupies 340 m^{2} with approximate height of slightly over 6 m tall walls, that appears to be originally two-storey structure supported by wooden beams.

Most of the interior walls, ceilings, and stairs of the fort were destroyed. Nothing left except for the walls and towers along with small interior remains.

== Building materials and history ==
The fort was originally known in historical documents as the fort of al-Hafa'ir. It was built by the Ottoman Empire dynasty to facilitate the pilgrimage process and to protect the pilgrims in their journey to the holy sites.

Varieties of materials were used during the construction, primarily local limestones and sandstones (also schist and gneiss) additional to the employment of bricks on the upper levels and in different parts of the structure.

== See also ==
- Ajyad Fortress
- List of castles in Saudi Arabia
- Masmak fort
