= Battle of Turubah =

- Part of the Hejaz-Nejd War and Al-Khurma dispute
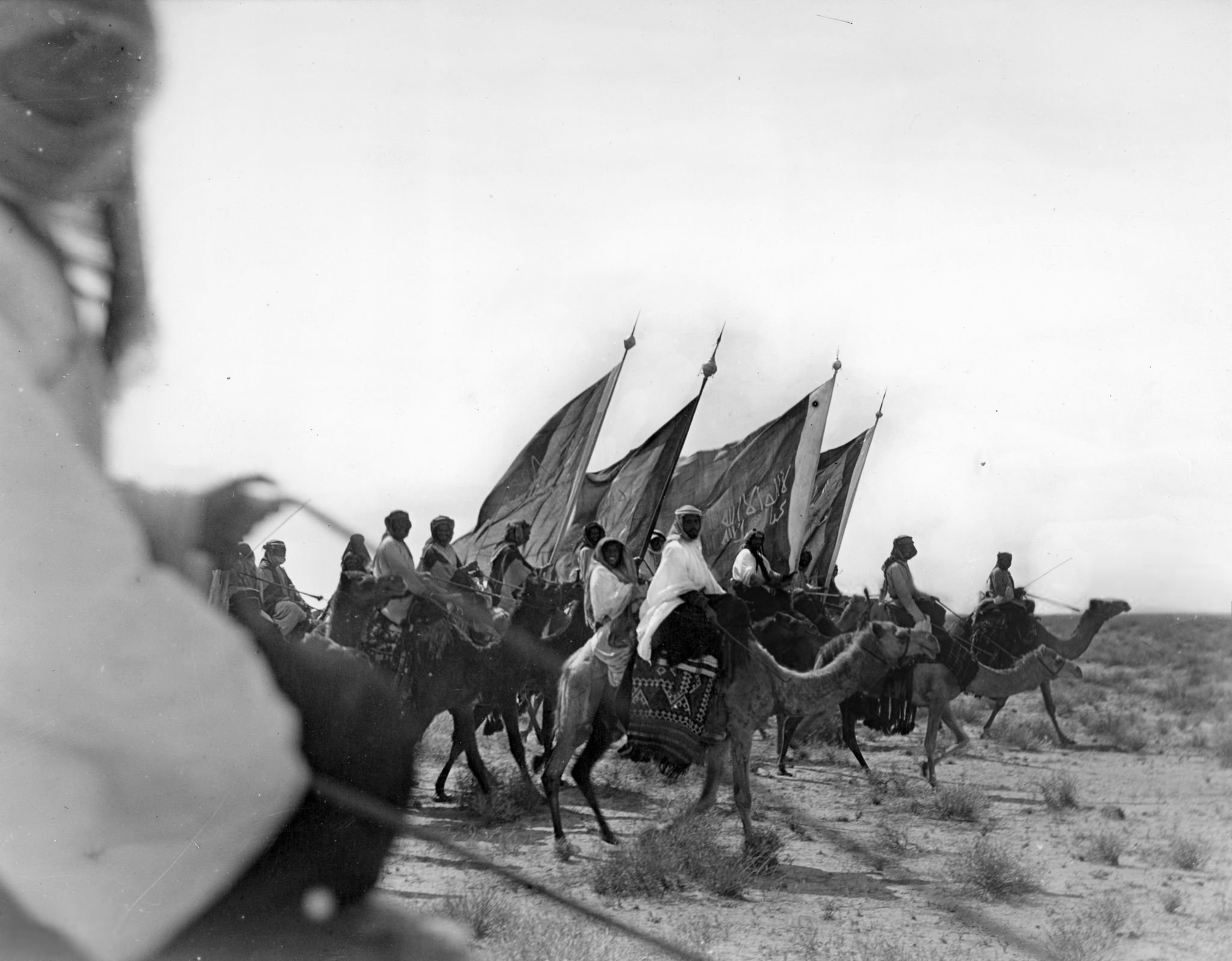
- Ikhwan fighters
Date	May 26, 1924
Location	Turubah, modern Saudi Arabia 21°10′12″N 41°36′00″E
Result	Overwhelming Ibn Saud victory End of Hashemite power in the Arabian Peninsula

Belligerents
Hejaz	Abdulaziz bin Saud

Commanders and leaders
Abdullah bin Al-Hussein	Abdulaziz bin Abdul Rahman Al Saud; Khalid ibn Luai; Sultan bin Bajad Al Otaibi

Strength
850 regulars 1,500 tribal levies 10 artillery pieces 20 light machine guns 20 heavy machine guns	12,000 tribal levies 1,500 Ikhwan skirmishers

Casualties and losses
All save for 157 regulars All equipment captured	Unknown

The Battle of Turubah was fought on May 26, 1924, between the forces of Hussein bin Ali, under the command of his son Abdullah bin Al-Hussein, and forces under the command of Abdulaziz bin Abdul Rahman Al Saud. It was a larger part of the Hejaz-Nejd War, as well as the Al-Khurma dispute. The battle resulted in the end of Hussein's hopes to expand into the Arabian peninsula, as well as opening the way for Ibn Saud to fortify his own control over the region, which in turn would eventually lead to the creation of Saudi Arabia.

== Prelude ==
As King of Hejaz, Hussein bin Ali had an over-realized sense of importance which led into many delusions. He believed that all Arabs supported him, said that his interpretation of the Quran superseded all other clerical opinions, and had dreams of forming an enlarged caliphate. These problems were combined with financial situations exacerbated in the period following World War I. British subsidies and payments began to be reduced, which caused Hussein to tax urban centers and meddle in the affairs of merchants. Bedouins who had been paid by Hussein through the subsidies now turned to raiding caravans and setting up toll roads around Mecca, Medina, Jeddah, and Taif. An attack against Iraqi pilgrims saw forty killed, which Hussein then compensated, further straining his finances.

In 1918, Abdullah assaulted Khalid ibn Luai, the ruler of Taif, over a disagreement. This caused Ibn Luai not only to turn to Ibn Saud, in the neighboring Najd region, for support, but to embrace Wahabism. Hussein in turn devoted forces to secure Taif and fight Ibn Luai and, by extension, his sponsor Ibn Saud. In 1919, Hussein's forces took over the Ottoman arsenal in Medina, which gave him a large quantity of artillery pieces, machine guns, ammunition, and rifles.

On March 1, 1924, Kemal Ataturk abolished the caliphate institution. This sent shock waves in the Islamic world, as the institution had been in existence since the death of Muhammad in 632 AD. At the encouragement of Abdullah, Hussein declared himself caliph. Both of his sons swore fealty to him in their respective roles: Abdullah as Emir of Transjordan, and Faisal bin Al-Hussein as King of Iraq. Hussein's move disgruntled many local powers, including the British (who feared a caliph would agitate Muslims in India, Malaya, Egypt, and the Sudan), King Fuad of Egypt (who did not like Hussein's courting of Shiites in Iraq), and especially Ibn Saud in Central Arabia, who had no interest in caliphs.

Feeling confident about the weaponry taken in Medina, and feeling inspired for further expansion, Hussein ordered Abdullah to march into central Arabia and subdue Ibn Saud. Abdullah, having only a force of 850 regulars and 1500 tribal levies, and having already warned his father that their forces were inadequate, nonetheless obeyed. With him were ten artillery pieces and twenty light and heavy machine guns apiece. He went to the village of Turubah, which was, along with Khurmah, considered a tribal border between Ibn Saud and Hussein. Ibn Saud, hearing of this, assembled a large force of 12,000 tribal levies, along with 1500 Ikhwan warriors to serve as skirmishers. The Ikhwan were commanded by Ibn Luai and Sultan Ibn Bajad.

In May 1924, Ibn Saud sent Abdullah a messenger, requesting that he withdraw from Turubah. The messenger added that the Ikhwan were on the outskirts of the town already, which angered Abdullah so much that he had the messenger killed.

== Battle ==
Some days later, the Ikhwan attacked Turubah, right in the middle of the call for dawn prayers. The town was still covered in darkness, and most of Abdullah's forces were asleep or just waking up to pray. The Husseini army was completely overwhelmed. Of Abdullah's 850 regulars, only 157 survived. All machine guns, artillery pieces, and rifles were captured. Many of the captured Hashemite soldiers were sold into slavery.

Abdullah was nearly killed by the Ikhwan. He was only saved when Zeid Ibn Shakir, father of a future Jordanian general, provided him a horse and camel for escape.

(It is interesting to note that both Hussein and Ibn Saud were funded by different British departments - thus at Turubah the Foreign Office and India Office were in essence "at war" with each other.)

== Aftermath ==
The victory sent shockwaves throughout Mecca, Medina, Jeddah, London, and Cairo. The British consul general in Jeddah sent a note to Ibn Saud, demanding he withdraw his forces from Turubah and Khurmah and return to the Najd. They even went so far as to threaten to void all agreements if he invaded the Hejaz. Despite the eagerness of the Ikhwan fighters to press onward, Ibn Saud chose to maintain his hold on Turubah and Khurmah. General Edmund Allenby, high commissioner in Cairo, had six biplanes shipped to Jeddah to defend the Hejaz. However, he was advised that if the pilots were captured in Ibn Saud's territory, they would be "cut to pieces", and so he kept them crated. In the years following, the British would lose interest in supporting Hussein and stopping Ibn Saud, leading Princess Modah, Ibn Saud's granddaughter, to later remark that the British had asked Ibn Saud to stop fighting after the Battle of Turubah, but now "are the source of his warlike power in money and weapons".

The effect of the battle was even worse on Hussein. He fell ill after hearing the news, and blamed his son. He became obsessed with seeking revenge on Ibn Saud. Instead of preparing to defend the Hejaz, he sought further expansion by demanding from T. E. Lawrence that the British grant him complete control of Iraq, Palestine, and the Transjordan. Another of Hussein's sons, Ali bin Hussein, would rule in the Hejaz after his father fled to the Transjordan. This proved short-lived: Ibn Saud would launch an offensive, taking Mecca and Jeddah in 1925. In 1926, he declared himself King of Hejaz.
