= Siege of Diriyah =

Destruction of diriya from 1811 to 1818

Coordinates: 24°44′00″N 46°34′32″E

- Part of the Najd Expedition
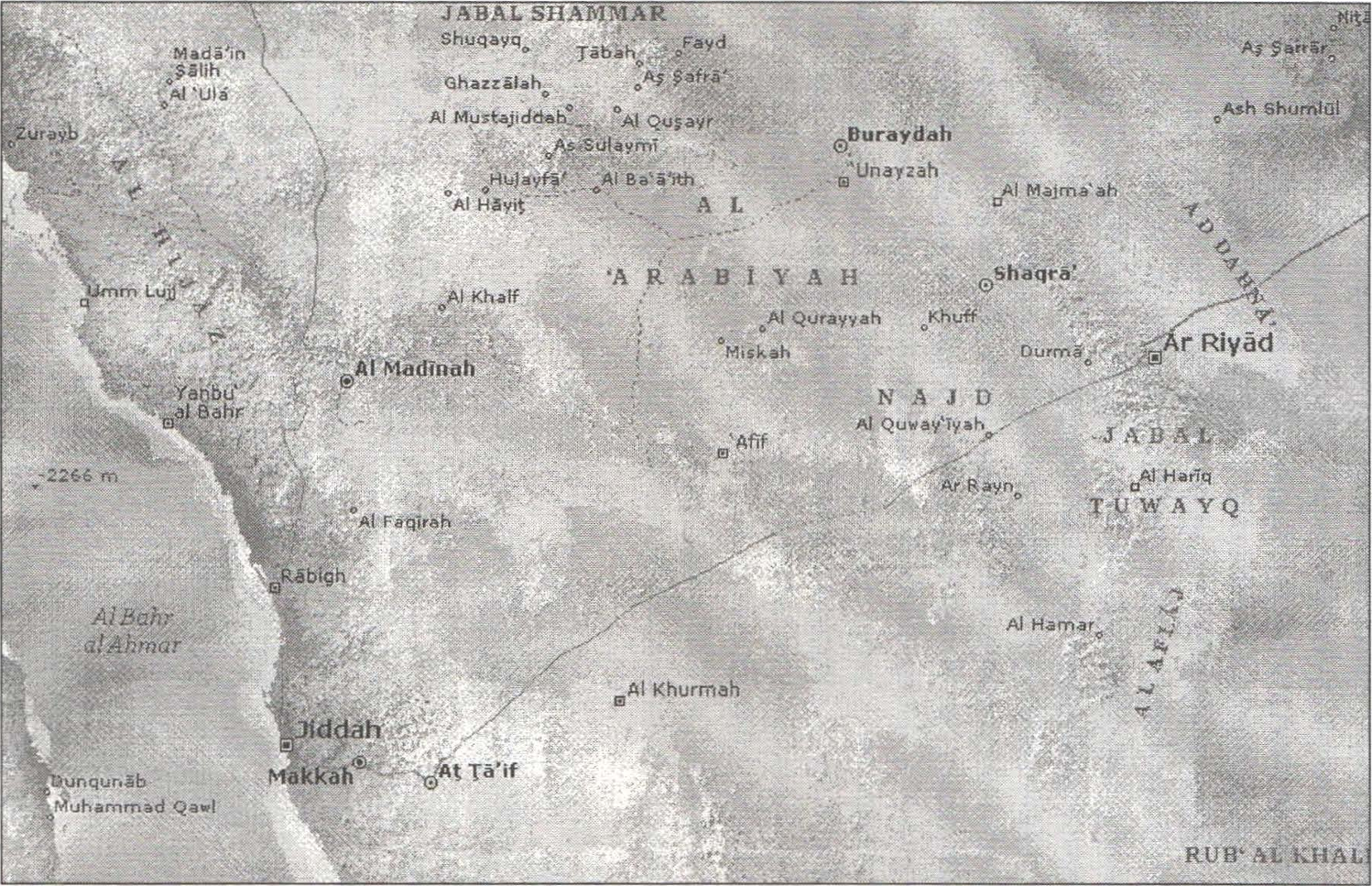
- Map showing the places captured by Ibrahim Pasha along his campaign route from Medina to Riyadh
Date	22 April – 9 September 1818
Location	Diriyah
Result	Ottoman victory

Belligerents
Ottoman Empire	Emirate of Diriyah

Commanders and leaders
(Ottoman Empire) Ibrahim Pasha (Ottoman Empire) Muhammad Ali of Egypt	Abdullah bin Saud (executed); Ghasab bin Sharaan †

Strength
5,500 men or 7,600 men (4,300 Turkish and Albanian soldiers 2,000 cavalrymen 1,300 Maghrebi cavalrymen 150 gunners)	Unknown

Casualties and losses
1,500 killed	1,300 killed

The siege of Diriyah was a successful Ottoman siege that took place in late 1818 at the end of the Wahhabi War of 1811–1818 during the Nejd Expedition.

== Background ==
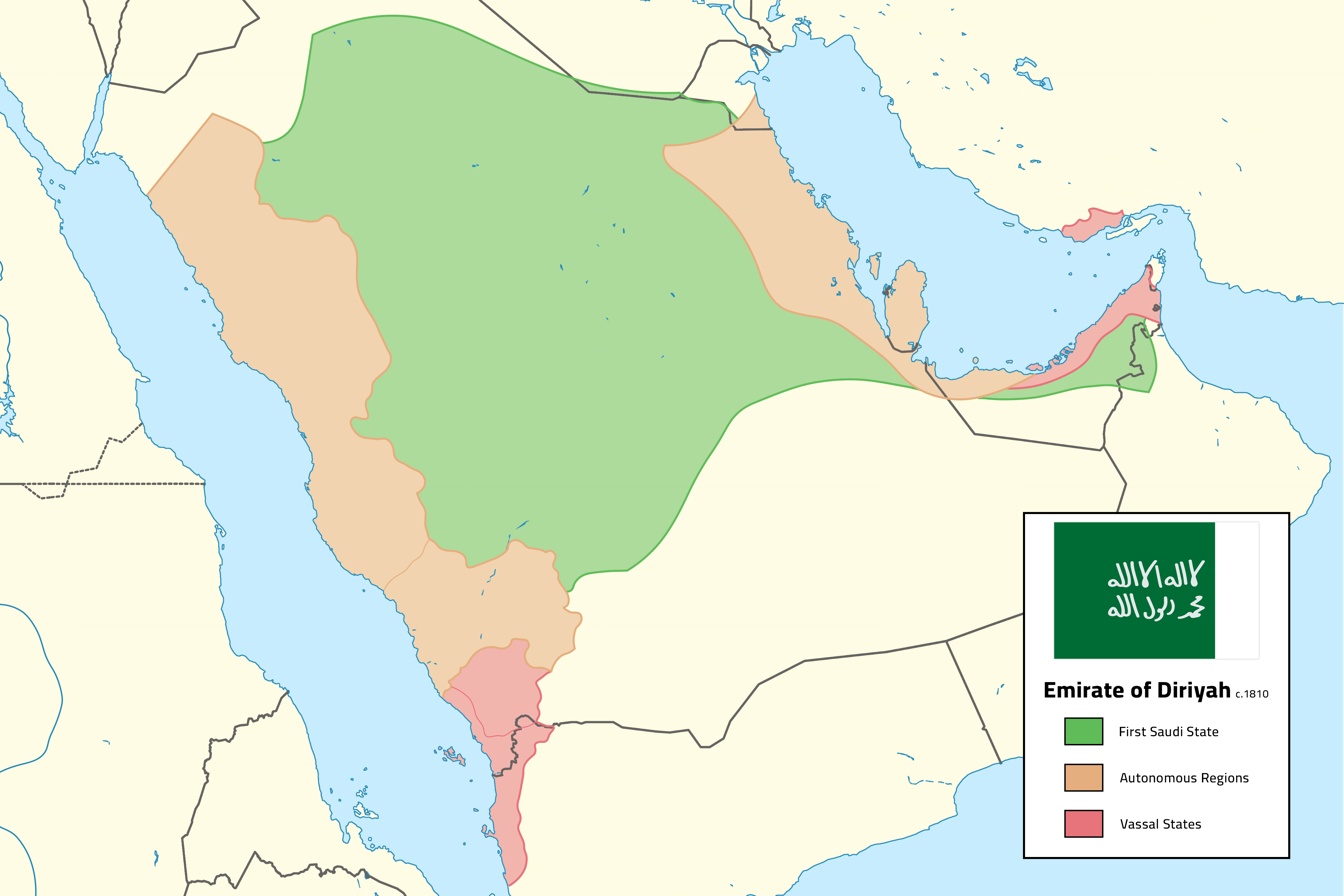
The greatest extent of the First Saudi State

In September 1817, Ibrahim Pasha of Egypt launched a campaign into the interior of Arabia in the hope of subduing the Emirate of Diriyah. The campaign was largely successful, capturing the major forts of Shaqra and Dhurma, and now Ibrahim was left with Diriyah, the capital of the emirate.

== Preparations ==
=== Ottomans ===
Having captured the fort of Dhurma, Ibrahim Pasha stayed there for two months due to heavy rains. He then left the city on March 22 and went to Diriyah. He arrived there on April 22. Ibrahim's force consisted of 5,500 infantry and cavalry with 12 cannons, or 7,600 men, including 4,300 Turkish and Albanian soldiers, 2,000 cavalrymen, 1,300 Maghrebi cavalrymen, and 150 gunners. Ibrahim then began inspecting the fort. Diriyah had five neighborhoods, with each one having its own walls; it was heavily fortified and had cannons to protect from any attack. Ibrahim began arranging his forces and preparing the cannons; he was assisted by the French general, M. Vaissière, who helped him draw the walls of the city.

=== Saudis ===
Abdullah bin Saud Al Saud began preparing for defense; he had those people who escaped from the conquered Ottoman towns; he had arranged them in the center of the valley, right and left outside of the city. They began building barricades and had cannons as defense. He began establishing his forces in the south of the city and other sections of the walls with barricades that prevents them from reaching the walls.

== Siege ==
=== Battle of 'Alab ===
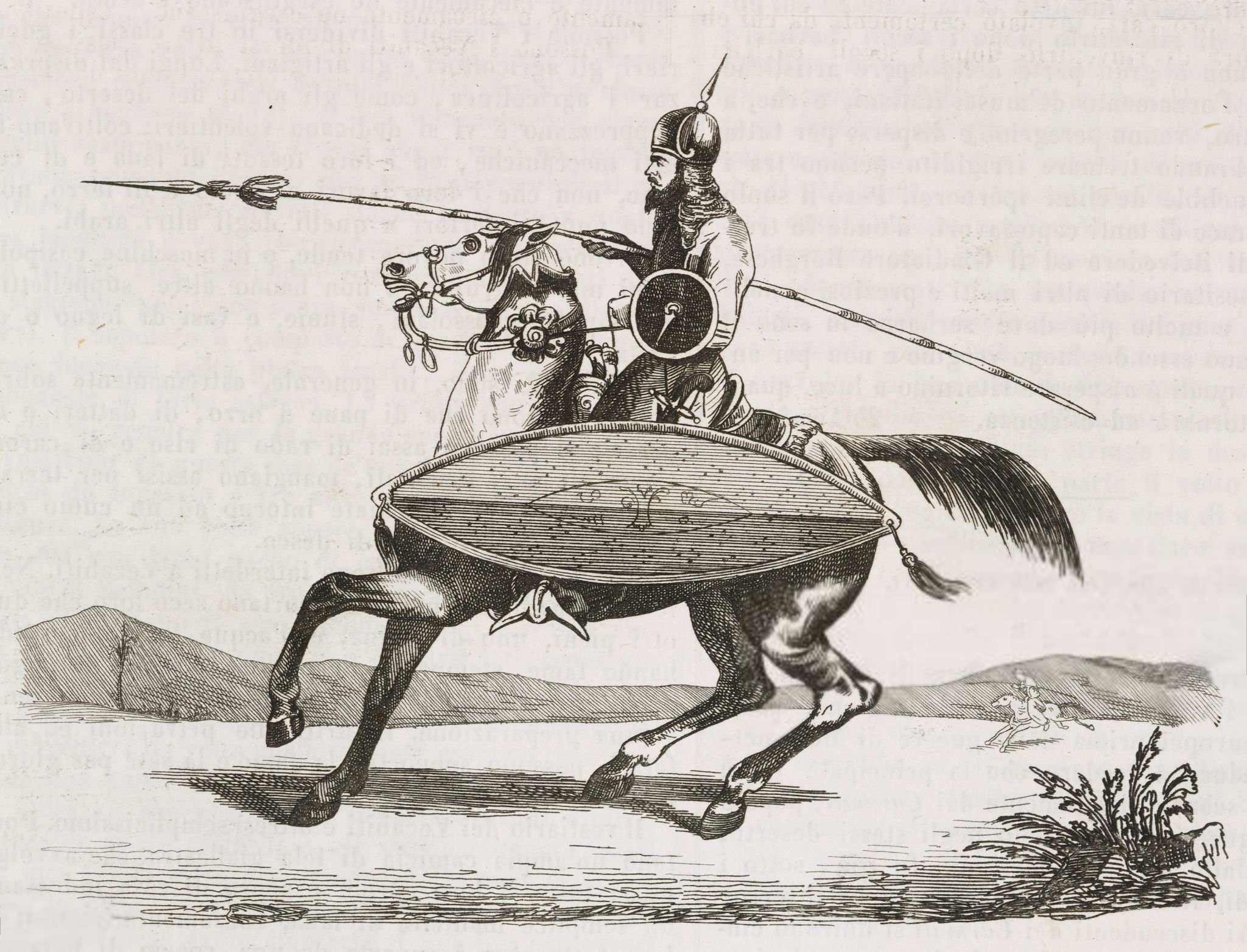
Saudi cavalry

After Ibrahim Pasha camped on the outskirts of Diriyah, he moved with some of his soldiers on horses and some cannons to choose the positions he wanted to land at Diriyah until he reached the Al-'Alab area, at the top of Diriyah, where Ibrahim Pasha dug barricades opposite the barricades of Abdullah, and Abdullah began firing from his cannons resulting in a fierce battle for ten days. In the tenth day the Saudi forces rallied their men and prevented them from bombarding the northern walls.

=== Battle of Ghubaira' ===
Ibrahim Pasha then moved to Ghubaira's walls, where at night he had some cavalry and stationed them next to Ghubaria's barricades and attacked them from behind, and in the dawn he sent reinforcements to the cavalry. The Ottomans killed 100 of the enemy, and the Saudis retreated back but regrouped and repulsed the Ottomans, with losses on the Ottoman side.

=== Battle of Samha ===
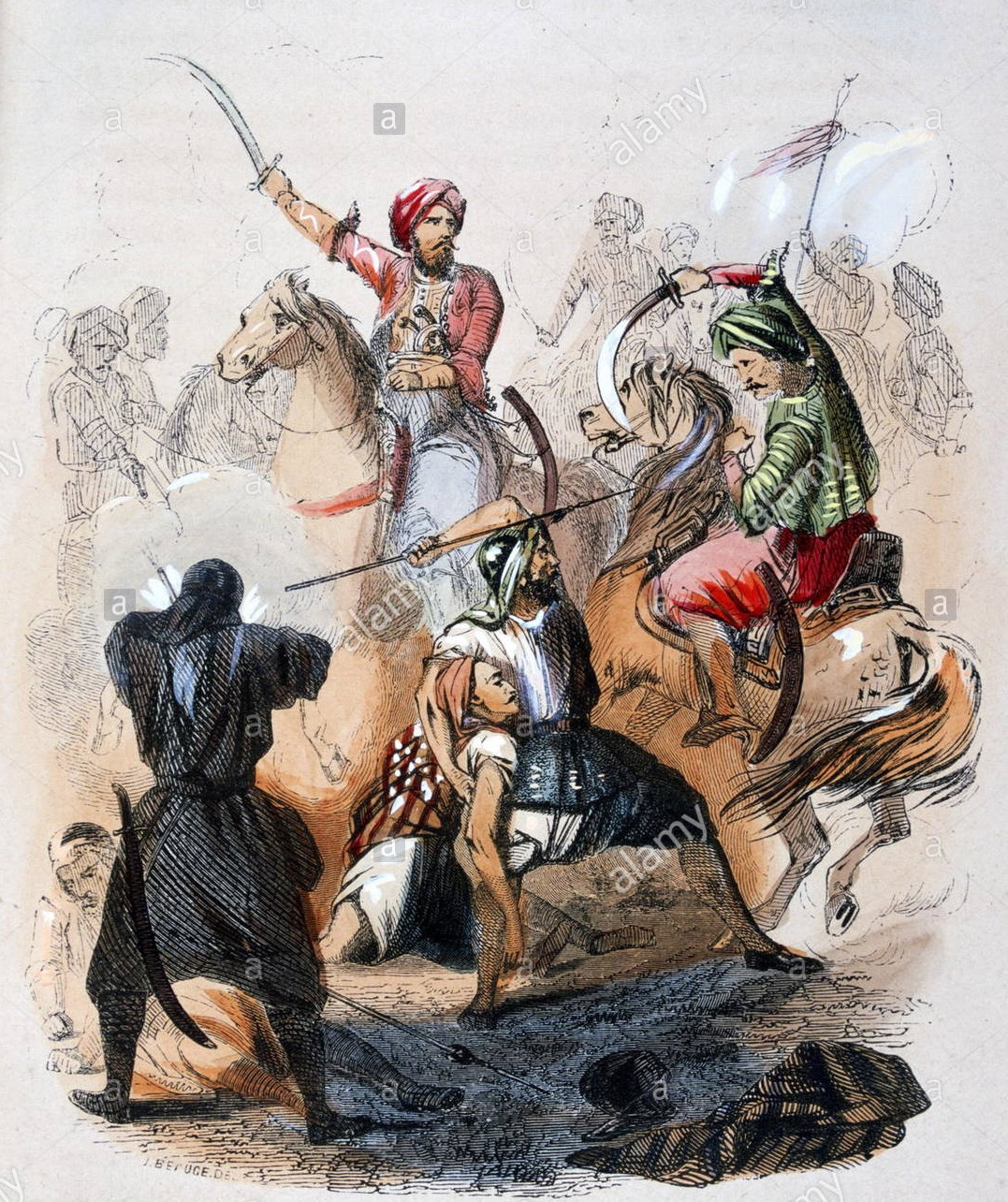
Ibrahim Pasha fighting the Saudis

The northern section of the walls, about a month after the siege, was where the Saudis were defeated and moved away from their barricades because some people from the city went out to Ibrahim Pasha and told him of the weakness in the fort. Ibrahim Pasha gathered the cavalry and attacked them on some of the barricades, as guided by those who joined them from the people of Diriyah, so he stormed the shield of Omar bin Saud, the barricade of his brother Faisal bin Saud the Great in Samha, and others. The tower protecting Omar's barricade, including its cannons, also fell, and they retreated.

Soon after this, the barricades in the north and south fell to the Ottomans.

=== Assault on Assalmani, Balida, Qulaiqel, and 'Arqa ===
After their withdrawal from Samha, the Saudis engaged with the Turks on the walls of Assalmani; a fierce battle ended with the Ottomans beaten back from the walls. The Ottomans attempted to attack the south, and once again a fierce battle ensued in which both sides suffered casualties. With the battle raging from afternoon till evening, another assault happened in Balida from noon till evening when the Ottomans succeeded in capturing the barricades of Balida, but the Saudis regrouped and beaten the Ottomans back. Another assault was done by the Ottomans on Qulaiqel, who was once again beaten back.

Ibrahim Pasha then attacked the south village in a place called "Arqa." The Ottomans succeeded in capturing the village and killing 30 Saudis who fled to the walls. The Ottomans then burned the village.

=== Fire on the Ottoman camp ===
The siege lasted for more than two months. On June 21, 1818, a storm blew over the Ottoman camp and blew out a fire that was lit by one of the soldiers that was close to the gunpowder storage. The fire spread to the storage and blew it up, wiping out half of the Ottoman's powder and ammunition, which caused panic in the camp. Ibrahim was then forced to ask for reinforcements from Ottoman bases that were conquered by the enemy, such as Shaqraa, Unaizah, Mecca, and Medina. The Saudis planned to attack the disorderly camp, but that didn't happen.

=== Assault on Arrafia' ===
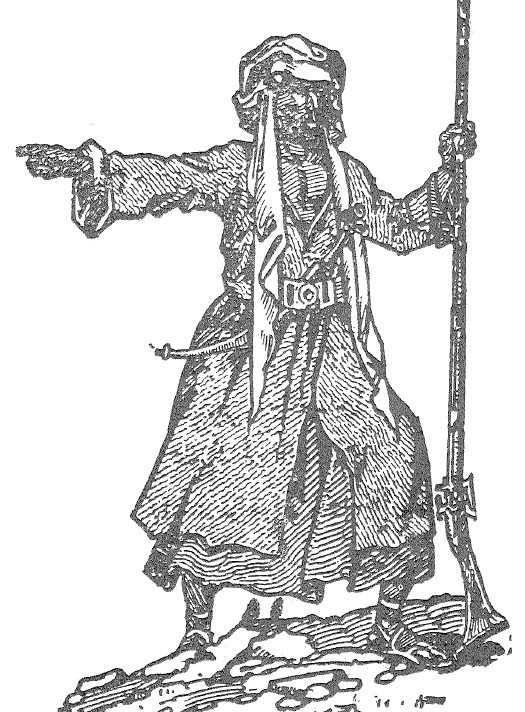
Saudi warrior

Another assault was launched on Arrafia's eastern side of the city, and with a cavalry force, he succeeded in capturing the barricades on the eastern side. However, the Saudis launched a sortie that repulsed the Ottomans, but Ibrahim again charged, and a fierce battle ensued from morning till noon in which both sides suffered heavy losses.

=== Assault on all sides ===
In September, Ibrahim began preparing a full assault on every side of the wall with his newly arrived reinforcements; he sent Ali Uzun to the south, and Ibrahim began preparing the artillery in the north and began assaulting the walls from the north and south; the Ottomans assaulted on Mashrafa's side; the Ottomans succeeded in capturing their barricades; both sides suffered heavy losses; the Saudis were forced to disperse their forces on all sides; the Ottomans partly entered the walls and nearly conquered the fort; however, once again they were beaten back.

=== Surrender of Diriyah ===
The siege had lasted for five months. Abdullah knew he wouldn't last long after he suffered heavy losses and supplies began to wane, so he asked for surrender on September 9. Ibrahim was delighted with this and ordered the fight to stop. Abdullah negotiated with Ibrahim to cede Diriyah and nearby cities to the Ottomans in exchange for the safety of the Saudis and that Abdullah would travel to Cairo and Constantinople, to which he agreed.

News arrived in Cairo on October 28, and Muhammad Ali Pasha was delighted to hear the news, and celebrations were made.

=== War casualties ===
The Ottomans suffered 1,500 deaths during the siege, and the Saudis lost around 1,300.

== Aftermath ==
=== Destruction of Diriyah and death of Abdullah bin Saud ===
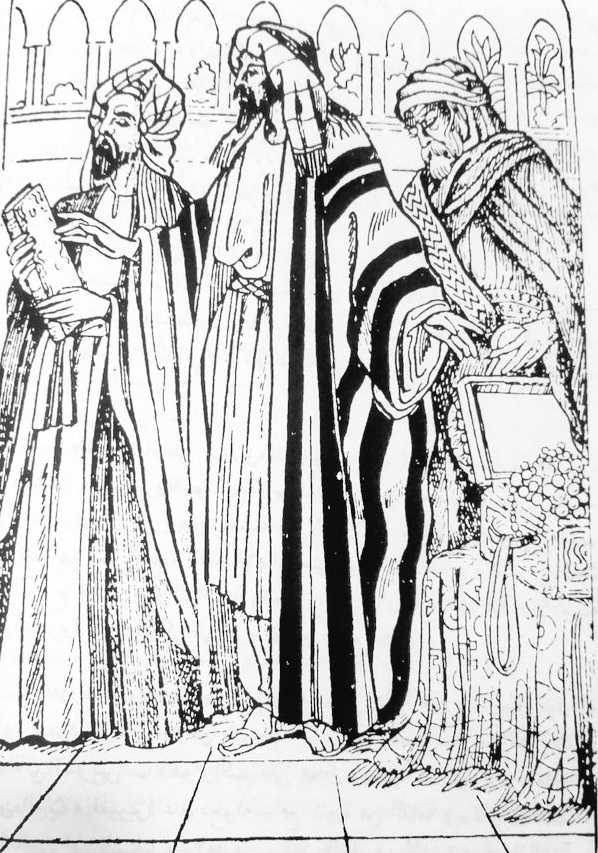
Abdullah in Cario

Muhammad Ali broke the treaty between Ibrahim and Abdullah and ordered the city to be destroyed with its walls and houses and burned to the ground. Ibrahim Pasha's troops plundered Diriyah and massacred several Saudi ulama. Ibrahim pasha showed a harsh attitude towards the Saudis. He ordered Abdullah to prepare for the journey to Istanbul, 400 men escorted him to Cairo where Muhammad Ali kindly received him, two days later he was hurried off to Istanbul guarded by a detachment of Tartars. When he reached Istanbul he was paraded in the streets for three days amid celebrations. Several Turkish ulama tried to convince him of the errors of his faith during his brief imprisonment. When the spectacle was over Abdullah was beheaded, after the execution his head was crushed with a mortar and his body was suspended on a post with a dagger plunged into it for all to see.

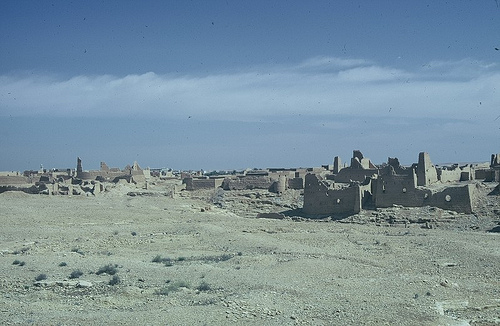
Ruins of Diriyah

More brutal punishments of the Saudis followed, notably against two sheikhs who had personally offended Ibrahim Pasha two years earlier. The first who was the former governor of Diriyah had all of his teeth pulled out while the second was beaten and tied to the mouth of cannon which was then fired.
