= List of castles in Saudi Arabia =

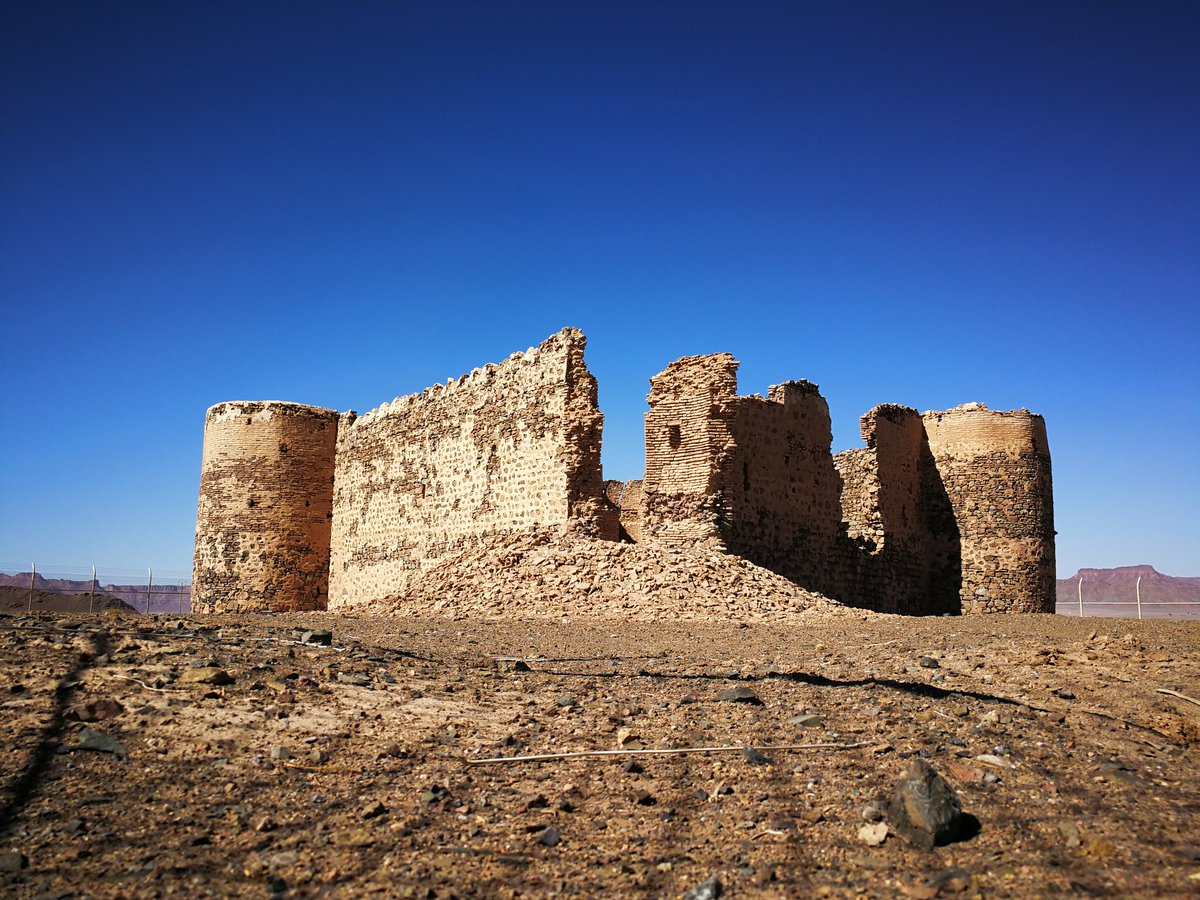
Al-Faqir Fort

This is a list of castles in Saudi Arabia.

- Ajyad Fortress
- Al-Faqir Fort
- Al-Ukhaydir, Tabuk Province
- Dhat al-Hajj
- Marid Castle
- Masmak fort
- Qal'at al-Mu'azzam
- Qal'at al-Qatif
- Qamus
- Qasr Ibrahim
- Asfan Castle
- Qishla of Jeddah
- Qishla of Mecca
- Qisla of Ha'il
- Shanqal Fort
- Tarout Castle
- Uqair

== See also ==
- Archaeology of the Arabian Peninsula
