= Asfan Castle =

Historical edifice in Asfan, Saudi Arabia

Coordinates: 21°54′58.6944″N 39°20′23.9244″E

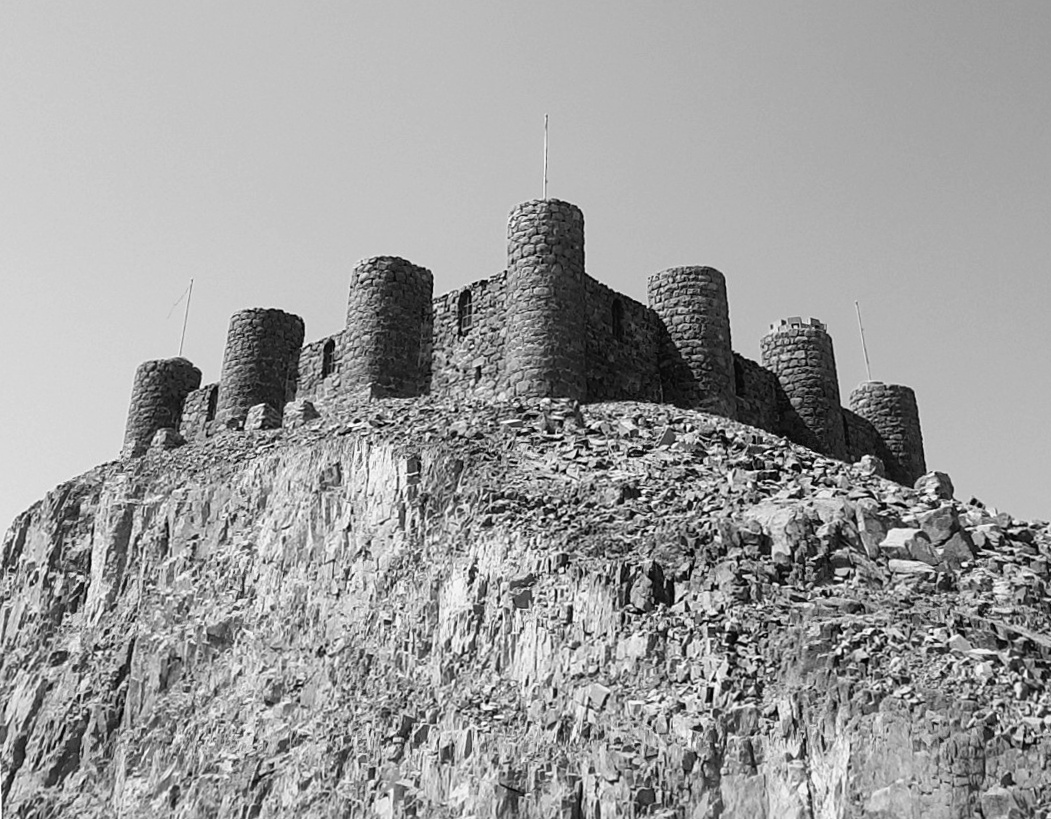

Asfan Castle (Arabic: قلعة عسفان, romanized: qalʿat ʿasfān) is a historical edifice in Asfan Village, 30 km North of both Jeddah and Mecca, Saudi Arabia, built in the eighteenth century -Exact date is disputed- as an outpost of the Ottoman army, Monitoring the road between Mecca and Medina.

The small Fort is equipped with an Ammo storage and ready sites for light Artillery. However, there is no reference that story-tells its rule during the Ottoman-Saudi War (Wahhabi War) between 1811 and 1818.

== Gallery ==
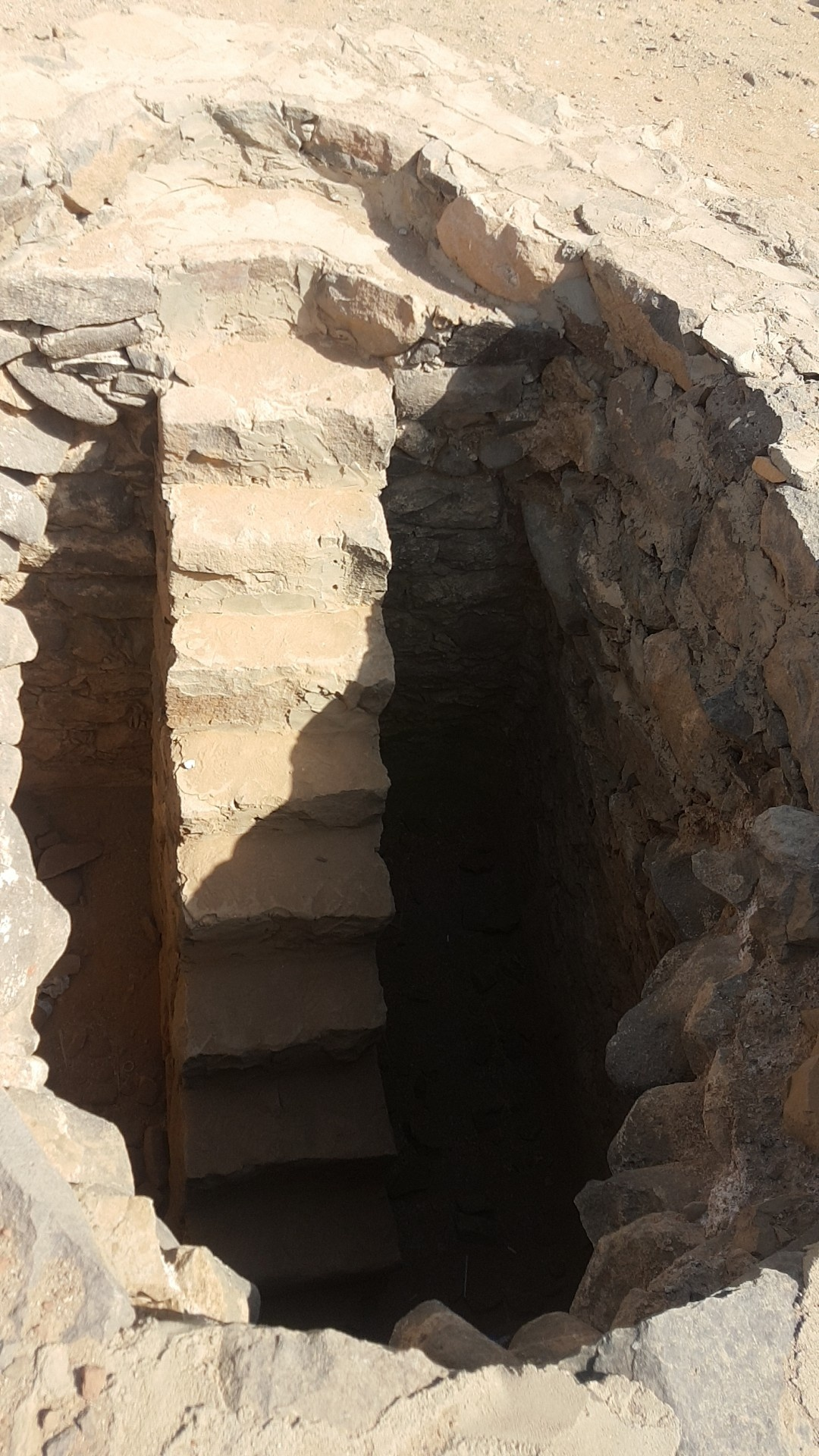

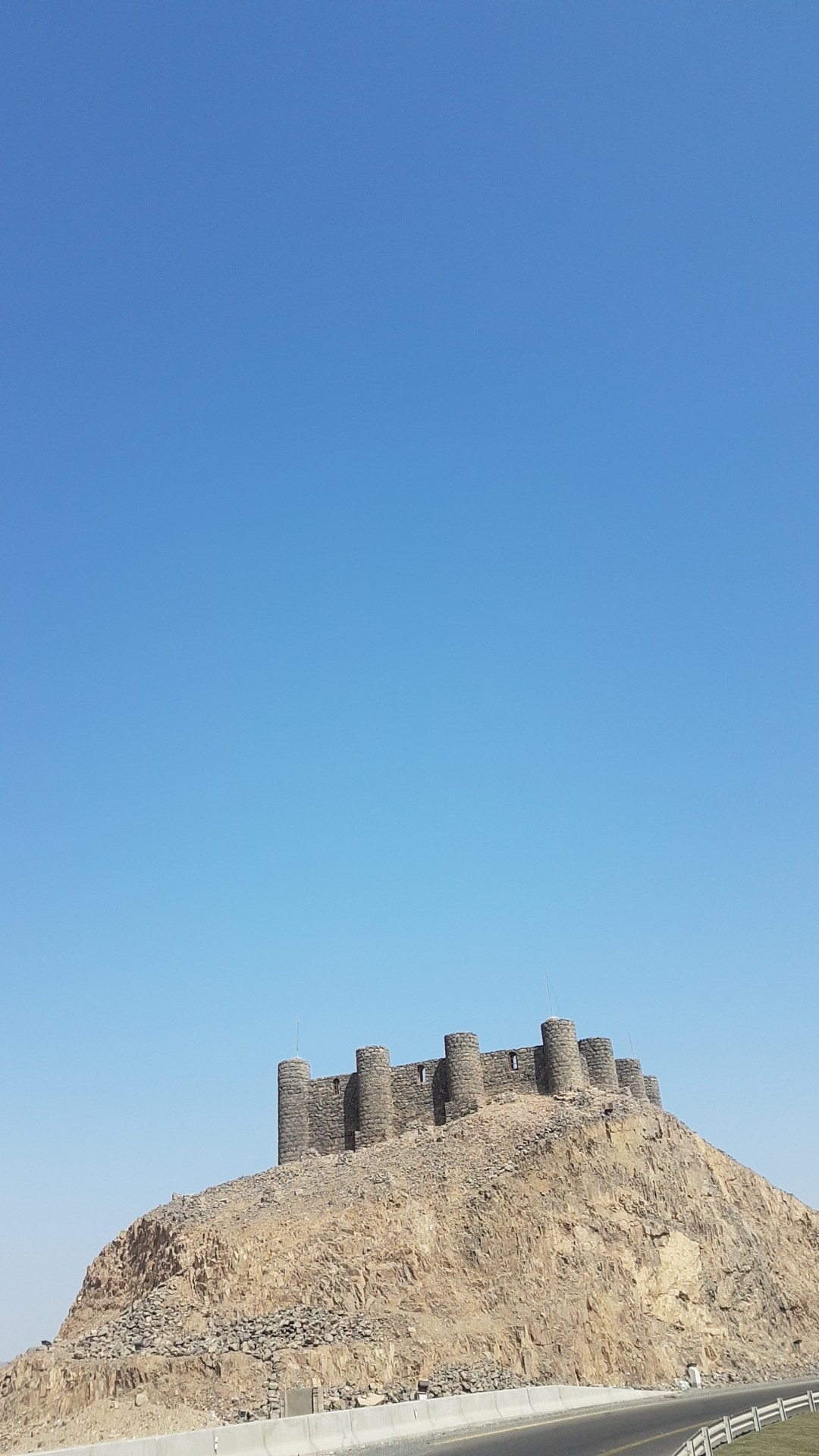

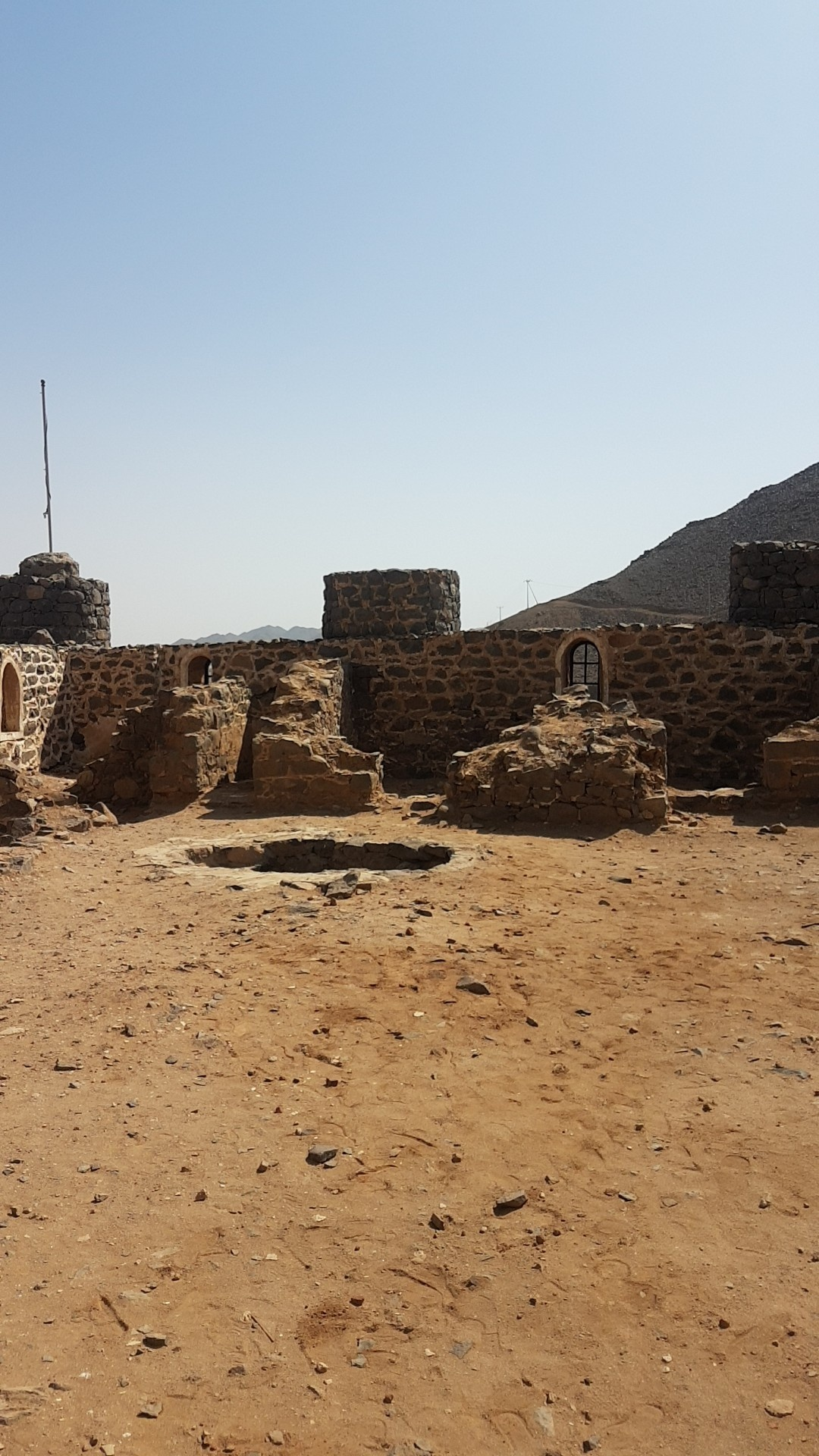

== See also ==
- List of castles in Saudi Arabia
