= Al-Khurma dispute =

1918–1919 War

First Saudi–Hashemite War
- Part of the Unification of Saudi Arabia
Date	July 1918 – 4 July 1919
Location	Turubah, Kingdom of Hejaz
Result	Saudi victory
Territorial changes	The Emirate of Nejd gains territories from the Hejaz

Belligerents
Najd and Hasa: Ikhwan tribesmen; Al-Khurma tribesmen	Hejaz

Commanders and leaders
Abdulaziz bin Saud; Sultan bin Bajad; Hamud ibn Omar †; Khalid ibn Mansur †	Hussein bin Ali; Abdullah bin Hussein

Casualties and losses
2,000 killed	5,000 killed
- 7,000+ soldiers and 1,392+ civilians killed

The First Saudi–Hashemite War, also known as the First Nejd–Hejaz War or the al-Khurma dispute, took place in 1918–19 between Abdulaziz Ibn Saud of the Emirate of Nejd and Hasa and the Hashemites of the Kingdom of Hejaz.

The war came within the scope of the historic conflict between the Hashemites of Hejaz and the Saudis of Riyadh (Nejd) over supremacy in Arabia. It resulted in the defeat of the Hashemite forces and capture of al-Khurma by the Saudis and their allied Ikhwan, but British intervention prevented immediate collapse of the Hashemite kingdom, establishing a sensitive ceasefire that would last until 1924.

== Background ==
When World War I began, Ibn Saud, the powerful Emir of Nejd, offered the Hashemite ruler Sharif Husayn ibn Ali and the leaders of Ha'il and Kuwait to adopt a neutral stance in the conflict, avoiding intervention in European-related matters, and seeking self-determination for the Arab people. However, with no interests coinciding, no agreement was reached. Ibn Saud ignored involvement on any side for the first two years of war, while Sharif Husayn of Hejaz began promoting the Arab Revolt against the Ottoman Empire, proclaiming himself "King of the Arabs." Ibn Saud was infuriated over the Sharif's claim to the entire Arab peninsula and demanded negotiations to consider the borders of Nejd and Hejaz. Husayn rejected Saudi demands and insulted Ibn Saud, which eventually led Ibn Saud to become involved in the political crisis over al-Khurma oasis.

== The War ==
=== First clashes (1918) ===
Ibn Saud himself however did not maintain neutrality through World War I, being generously supported by the British against the pro-Ottoman emirate of Ha'il. In December 1917, a British deputation, led by Colonel R.E. Hamilton, tried to convince the Saudi leader to take action against the Ha'il emirate of Jabal Shammar. This attempt was unneeded as the Shammar rulers were already hostile and at war with the Saudis since their capture of Riyadh. In return for active campaigning effectively, Ibn Saud demanded firearms as he sought to recapture Ha'il like previous Saudi states and get revenge for his father's exile. The British gave him the opportunity. Yet, the British advancement in the Ottoman province of Palestine made the Saudis less relevant, while the Hashemite leader in turn concluded a peace agreement with Jabal Shammar. Thus, in the fall of 1918, when Ibn Saud organized some 5,000 men against Jabal Shammar, a British demand to cease military activities came in.

Al-Khurma, a crucial strategic oasis on the way between Nejd and Hejaz, had been under Hashemite rule, but following the dispute between the Saudis and the Hashemites, Khurma's emir Khalid ibn Mansur ibn Luwai defected to the Saudi side. In July 1918, after the defection of al-Khurma's emir, a detachment was dispatched by the Hashemite King to seize al-Khurma. In response, Ibn Saud sent his Ikhwan forces to protect the oasis, defeating the Hashemites from Mecca.

=== Negotiations ===
Following the end of World War I, Sharif Husayn sought to strike a deal with Ibn Saud over the al-Khurma oasis. The conflict at that point expanded from a political dispute into a religious sectarian dimension, with the Wahhabis of Nejd standing against the Sunni Hashemites. Sharif Husayn decided on another expedition to Khurma. Though aware of the coming dispute, the British turned a blind eye to the Hashemite advances, largely underestimating the strength of the Saudis, who the British thought would be quickly overrun.

=== Battle of Turaba ===
In May 1919, a Hashemite army, led by Abdallah ibn Husayn, was dispatched towards Turaba, an oasis some 80 miles away from Khurma. Turaba was seized and plundered on May 21. Ibn Saud dispatched a warning to the Hashemites, that their presence in Turaba or advance on Khurma would provoke a war, but neither side was willing to compromise at that time.

An Ikhwan force led by Sultan bin Bajad, Hamud ibn Umar and Khalid meanwhile advanced on Turaba, and attacked the Hashemites by surprise on May 25–26 in their camp. In a few hours, an entire Hashemite army was annihilated, with hundreds killed and thousands escaping in disarray. Abdallah ibn Husayn himself barely managed to flee the battlefield.

=== Saudi preparations to conquer Hejaz ===
The battle of Turaba was a turning point in the conflict, placing Sharif Husayn in a very weak position against Ibn Saud. In early July 1919, Ibn Saud himself arrived to Turaba with an army of 10,000 men, ready to advance on Hejaz. On July 4, however, a British ultimatum arrived to the Saudis, demanding to stop the campaign and return the Nejd. Unwilling to face the British, Ibn Saud submitted to the British demand and capitulated. It however could not change the notion of the Saudi ruler that the victory over Hejaz is possible.

== Aftermath ==
In the next 4 years, the Saudi ruler was preoccupied with consolidation of his domain, undertaking several campaigns in new regions of Arabia, while keeping the Hejazi frontier quiet. Jabal Shammar was annexed in 1920–21, while Kuwait was defeated in 1922, defining the border with Iraq and Transjordan through the Uqair protocol of 1922, while simultaneously conquering Asir in south Arabia. By early 1923, Ibn Saud decided to take over Hejaz, but was unsure over British position. The key turning point was the decision by the British in late 1923 as an economy measure to cease paying subsidies to Ibn Saud and the Sharif of Mecca. Without the £60, 000 annual subsidy in gold coins paid to him by the British government, the principle reason for Ibn Saud to not invade the Hejaz was removed. Likewise, the end of the subsidies amounting to £25,000 gold coins per month to Husayn spelled the end of his regime as Husayn needed British gold to bribe Bedouin tribal chiefs to fight for him.

The worsening relations between Britain and Hashemite rulers and the proclamation of Sharif Husayn as Caliph, finally prompted Ibn Saud to undertake the campaign, enthusiastically supported by the religiously insighted Ikhwan, who had hoped to take over the holy sites of Islam. The preliminary attack on Taif came in September 1924, beginning the Saudi conquest, which would be complete in December 1925.

== Casualties and Deaths ==
The number of fatalities in the 1918–19 war were hundreds of killed, including civilians and soldiers, while there were thousands of people injured The total number of fatalities was estimated at 1,392.

== See also ==
- History of Saudi Arabia
- List of modern conflicts in the Middle East
- List of wars involving Saudi Arabia

== Books ==
- Lacey, Robert (1981). The Kingdom. New York: Harcourt Brace Jovanovich. ISBN 0-15-147260-2.
