= Shanqal Fort =

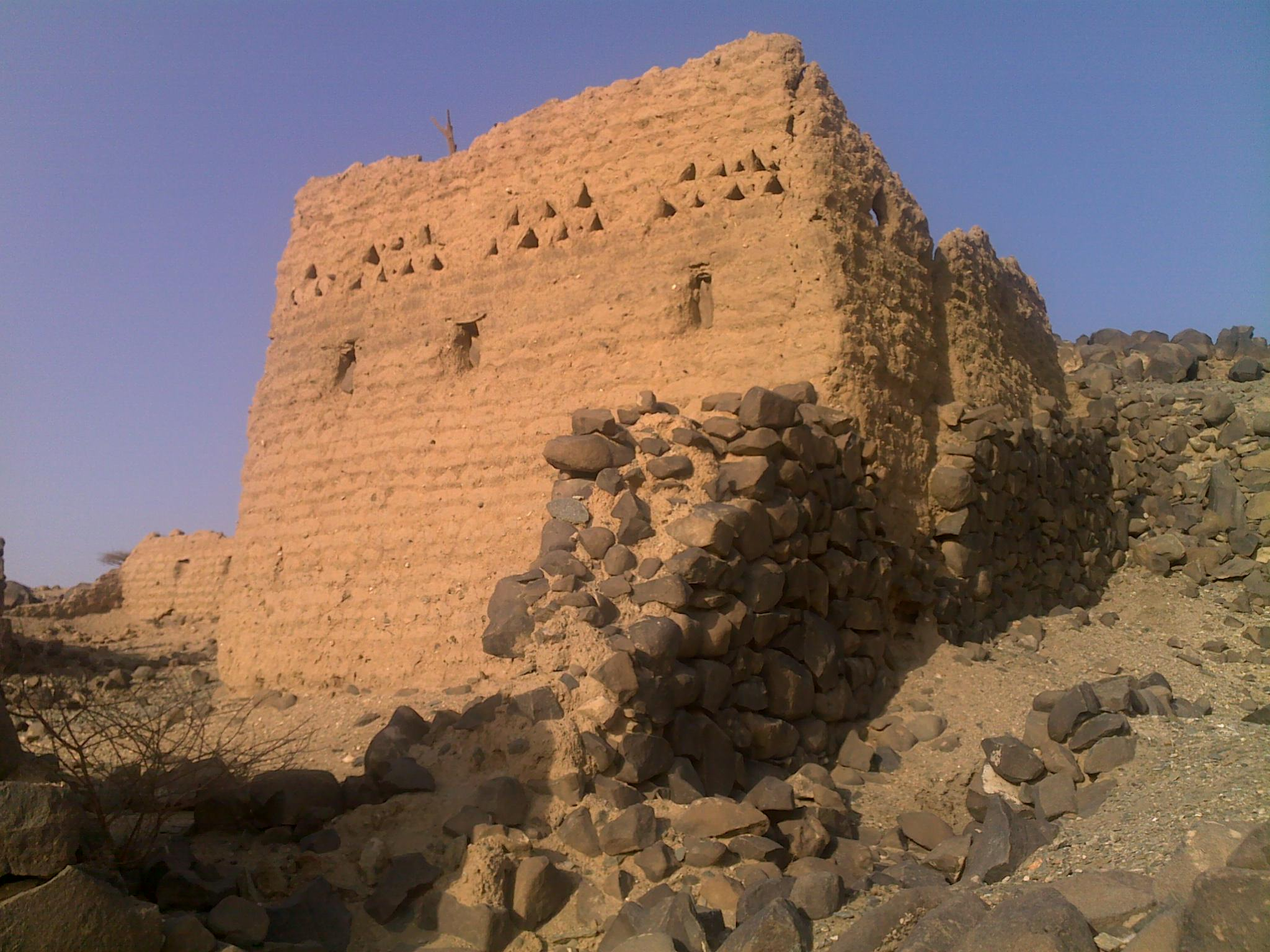
- Interactive map of Shanqal Fort
- 21°12′0″N 41°39′25″E
- Type: Fort
- Location: Turubah, Saudi Arabia

History
- Built: 1737 (construction started)

Site notes
- Elevation: 1,133 meters (3,717 ft)
- Area: 3,000 square metres (32,000 sq ft)

Shanqal Fort (Arabic: قلعة شنقل, romanized: qalʿat šanqal) is a ruined fort near the city of Turubah, Saudi Arabia. The fort is located in the village of Al-Labt, to the east of Turubah valley within the Makkah Region. It is built on the rocky slope which consists the northwestern border of the territory of Al-Baqum tribe, and it reaches 1133 meters above the sea level. Historians consider that the fort was a construction of the wealthy prince belonged to Al-Baqum tribe. Historian Muhammad bin Ghanam considers that the fort was established as a residence of the prince since 1729. Thus, it is likely that it was belonged to the Sheikh Abdurrahman bin Sultan al-Badri.

== See also ==
- List of castles in Saudi Arabia
