= Qishla of Mecca =

Former Ottoman fortress in Saudi Arabia

The Qishla of Mecca (Arabic: قشلة جرول, romanized: Qišlat Jarwal) was a fortress in Mecca, in what is now Saudi Arabia. Built in the eighteenth century as a military castle of the Ottoman Army, the building was located in the Jarwal district on the western side of the city. In the early hours of 10 June 1916, the barracks was attacked by Sharifian forces and its soldiers besieged.

It was demolished by the Saudi government to build several modern hotels facing the Grand Mosque.

== Etymology ==
The word Qishla (modern Turkish: Kışla) is a Turkish word meaning barracks.

== See also ==
- Ajyad Fortress
- Tarout Castle
- Qal'at al-Qatif
- List of castles in Saudi Arabia
