= Saud bin Abdulaziz Al Saud (1748–1814) =

Ruler of the First Saudi State, 1803–1814

Saud bin Abdulaziz bin Muhammad bin Saud I

Emir and Imam of Diriyah
- In office 1803 – 1814
- Preceded by: Abdulaziz bin Muhammad Al Saud
- Succeeded by: Abdullah bin Saud Al Saud

Personal details
- Born: 1748 Diriyah, Emirate of Diriyah
- Died: 27 April 1814 (aged 65–66) Diriyah, Emirate of Diriyah
- Children: List: Abdullah; Turki; Nasser; Saad; Mishari; Khalid
- Parent: Abdulaziz bin Muhammad (father)

Military service
- Battles/wars: Campaigns on Qatif (1788-1794) Campaigns on al-Hasa (1794) Invasion of Qatar (1793-1798) Thuwaini Al-Saadoun campaign (1797) Ail al-Kahiay Campaign (1798) Invasion of Bahrian (1801) Wahhabi sack of Karbala Wahhabi raids on Najaf Conquest of Hejaz Piracy in the Persian Gulf; Wahhabi Raids in Persian Gulf 1805 Battle of Izki Qajar-Wahhabi war Invasions of Kuwait (1793-1808) Battle of Al-Safra Capture of Al Hinakiyah Battle of Turubah (1813) Battle of Al Qunfudhah (1814)

Saud bin Abdulaziz Al Saud (Arabic: سعود بن عبد العزيز بن محمد بن سعود, romanized: Suʿūd ibn ʿAbd al-ʿAzīz ibn Muḥammad ibn Suʿūd; 1748 – 27 April 1814) ruled the First Saudi State from 1803 to 1814. Saud annexed Mecca and Medina from the Ottoman Empire making him the first Al Saud ruler who received the title of the servant of the Two Holy Cities. During his rule the state experienced a significant level of strength and expansion for which he was called Saud Al Kabeer or Saud the Great.

== Early life ==
Saud was born in Diriyah in 1748. He was the eldest son of Abdulaziz bin Muhammad. The mother of Saud was a daughter of Uthman bin Mu'ammar, ruler of Uyaina.

Saud's succession was decided and announced in 1787. Muhammad bin Abdul Wahhab, religious leader of the state, asked people to express their allegiance to him as heir apparent. It was Abdul Wahhab's last significant function in affairs of state. From early age Saud began to act as the chief military commander of the Emirate together with his uncle, Abdullah bin Muhammad, who was the father of Turki bin Abdullah, the founder of the Emirate of Nejd or the Second Saudi State. Saud led the forces of the Emirate in 1789 and conquered Al Hasa region defeating the army of the Bani Khalid Emirate who had been the ruler of the region. Although the rule of Bani Khalid Emir, Abdul Muhsin bin Abdullah Al Hamid, was ended by them, the Emirate could not completely capture the eastern Arabia. When Abdul Muhsin was killed by his tribe members in 1791, Saud again attacked them and won a victory eliminating the dominance of Bani Khalid in the region in 1792.

In April 1802 Saud led an army with 12,000 Wahhabis and attacked Karbala destroying the tomb of Imam Hussain bin Ali, a grandson of Muhammad. In addition, they stole valuable materials in the tomb and killed the inhabitants of the city. Following the incident Saud sent a message to the Ottoman governor in Iraq stating: "As for your statement that we seized Karbala, slaughtered its people, and took their possessions — praise belongs to God, Lord of the Worlds! We make no apology for that, and we say: 'And like catastrophes await the unbelievers' [Quran 47:10]."

== Reign ==
The reign of Saud bin Abdulaziz began in 1803. Upon his accession to the throne he held the titles of both Emir and Imam like his father.

Saud's reign was a period of religious cleansing in Arabia and in nearby regions. He continued to attack on shrines in Iraq, and Basra was blockaded by his forces for twelve days. The Emirate extended its rule beyond Najd and into the Hijaz which culminated with the capture of Medina in April 1804 and Mecca in 1806. In addition to capturing Hijaz he managed to strengthen his authority there. Furthermore, Bahrain and Oman were annexed to the Emirate, and Saud exerted his influence in Yemen. In 1805 Saud's supremacy was also recognized by the rulers of Qawasim and Muscat, and Saud managed to capture a part of Oman. The same year he also annexed the Buraimi Oasis.

Saud's forces transformed the Kaaba in Mecca and destroyed the tombs of numerous religious figures in Medina in accordance with Wahhabi theology. Due to the differences between Saud and the Ottomans in terms of the interpretation of Islam, Saud ordered not to mention the name of the Ottoman sultan in Friday prayers in Mecca. Following the capture of Mecca he sent a letter to Ottoman Sultan Selim III, inviting him to follow the Wahhabi theology. In the same letter he declared that he had captured Mecca and destroyed all tombs there and that he would not let people from Damascus and Cairo to visit Mecca "with the Mahmal and with trumpet and drums."

In 1807 Saud did not permit pilgrims from Egypt, Syria and Istanbul to enter Hijaz and expelled Turkish soldiers and settlers from Mecca. Such religious transformations did not sit well with other Muslims, and many other Muslims found his actions to be extreme, and were stunned that the holy cities had been taken so easily. The Ottoman Empire did not want to relent control over the cities to local tribesmen. The Ottomans could not retake the cities on their own though as the bulk of their forces were tied up in Europe. Muhammad Ali, the viceroy of Egypt, was assigned to recapture the Arabian territories in 1809. One of his sons, commanding the Egyptian troops, succeeded in re-conquering Hijaz in 1813.

== Personal life and death ==
Saud had a very different personality than his father, who was a deeply religious figure. He was interested in the material side of rule. However, like his grandfather and father he dressed in a plain way, and his armaments were not decorated like those of Mamluk and Ottoman rulers. He died in Diriyya on 27 April 1814 due to fever and was succeeded by his eldest son Abdullah.

Saud's other sons included Mishari, Turki, Nasser and Saad. His youngest son, Khalid, ruled the Emirate of Nejd or the Second Saudi State from 1838 to 1841 with the support of the Ottomans. Three of Saud's sons were killed in the siege of Diriyah by Ibrahim Pasha, who also arrested Saud's successor, Abdullah bin Saud. Mishari bin Saud returned to Diriyah in 1819 and attempted to establish his rule, but Mohammed bin Mishari bin Muammar who began to rule the region after the collapse of the Emirate imprisoned him.

Preceded by Abdulaziz bin Muhammad Al Saud	Emir and Imam of First Saudi State; 1803–1814	Succeeded by Abdullah bin Saud Al Saud
