= Ghaliyya Al Bogammiah =

Saudi military resistance leader (died 1818)

Princess Ghaliya
- غالية البدري البقمية
- Died: 1818
- Other names: Ghaliyya Al-Badry Al-Bogammiah, Ghaliyya bint Abdelrahman Al-Bogammy
- Known for: Resistance against Ottoman forces during the Wahhabi War / Battle of Turaba (1814)
- Title: Amira (Princess)
- Spouse: Prince Hamad Ben Abduallah ben-Umhay

Princess Ghaliya or Ghaliyya Al-Badry Al-Bogammiah (Arabic: غالية البدري البقمية; died 1818) was a Saudi woman who led military resistance to prevent the Ottoman recapture of Mecca during the Wahhabi War. She was given the title Amira, which is the female version of the title Emir which means princess, in recognition of her acts.

== Biography ==
Ghaliyya bint Abdelrahman Al-Bogammy was a Hanbali Bedouin from Tarba near Ta'if southeast of Mecca. She was the daughter of Sheikh Abd al-Rahman bin Sultan al-Badri from the Kalash family. Ghaliyya was the wife of Prince Hamad Ben Abduallah ben-Umhay, the governor of Tarba for the Emirate of Diriyah. She was described as intelligent, and used the fortune she inherited from her father to support her husband and their home and religion. When her husband was injured during the Hijaz wars, his injuries made him an invalid for years before he died; he made his wife the guardian of their minor son and heir, and thus, in effect, his regent.

During the Wahhabi War (1811–1818), Mecca was under attack from the Ottoman Empire, and she formed a military resistance movement to defend Mecca against the Ottoman forces. She allied with Al-Baqum, and provided Al-Baqum with money and provisions to fight the Ottoman. Because of her active participation, the Ottomans assumed that she was the ruling princess of the area, though she acted as the guardian of her son.

She was credited with boldness and strategic ability, and chronicles describe her participation: "Never had the resistance of the Arab tribes from the vicinity of Mecca been so strong as was that of the Arabs of Tarba ... . They had at their head a woman who bore the name of Ghaliyya." Ghaliya's tactics enabled her forces to repel Ottoman incursions successfully during the beginning of the war. Incapable of admitting that they could be defeated by a woman, the opponents spread rumours accusing her of being a sorceress who cast the Wahhabi forces invisible.

Specifically, this was to have taken place at the Battle of Turaba in 1814: "A number of incidents ensued (including a Saudi victory under the command of a woman, Ghaliya, at the Battle of Turaba in 1814)...", and: "Initially, Muhammad Ali suffered a series of military failures. In late 1813 and early 1814, his troops were defeated near Turaba and Qunfudha. In the Turaba battle, the Wahhabis were commanded by a woman, named Ghaliya, to whom the Egyptians immediately ascribed the power of casting the evil eye".

== Analysis ==
While modern and secondary sources describe Ghaliyya al-Bogammiah as a military leader who played a leading role among the Begoum Arabs in the early 19th century, primary Ottoman archival documents and contemporary chronicles do not mention any woman commanding Wahhabi forces or a Begum tribe involvement. Reports that she may have "influenced Ottoman soldiers' perception" or exercised direct battlefield command appear to be later literary or secondary accounts, often derived from Johann Ludwig Burckhardt, Gilbert Sinoué, or other modern historians. Consequently, her role in the conflict may have been exaggerated, and the evidence from contemporary sources does not confirm her as an active military commander.

== Notes ==
a: Spelled as "Trubah". source MAYYA ALRAJHI
