= Battle of Turubah (1813) =

Ottoman battle in Turubah. Saudi Arabia, 19th century

- Part of The Ottoman–Wahhabi war
Date	Late October or early November 1813
Location	Turubah, Saudi Arabia

Belligerents
Ottoman Empire: Eyalet of Egypt	Emirate of Diriyah

Commanders and leaders
Tusun Pasha	Ghaliyya Al Bogammiah

Strength
2,000 men	

Casualties and losses
700+ killed	

The Battle of Turubah took place in 1813 when Ottoman forces besieged Turubah.

== Background ==
The town of Turubah was located southeast of Mecca and was the home of the Al-Bugum tribes, who worked as shepherds and cultivators. They were led by a widow named Ghaliyya Al Bogammiah whose husband was one of the chiefs of Turuba and possessed great wealth. She distributed her wealth to the poor who were ready to fight the Ottomans and she usually held councils with other Saudi chiefs in her house. In the month of Sha'ban (August), she led the Saudi troops against Mustafa Bey, who attacked Turuba, and defeated the first Ottoman attack.

The Ottoman army's fears soon inspired stories against her. They regarded her as chief of the Wahhabis and circulated stories about her being a sorceress. Such reports generally discouraged the Ottomans and improved the confidence and morale of the Saudis. After the first failed attack on the city, Saud Bin Abdulaziz began fortifying it and ordered the Arab tribes of the Hejaz to reinforce the garrison.

== Battle ==
Muhammad Ali Pasha was determined to launch a second attack, so he dispatched his son Tusun Pasha with a force of two thousand men, who left Taif in late October or early November. During the march between Taif and Turuba, they encountered the hostile tribes of Otaibah, Nasira and Banu Sa'd. Tusun engaged with these tribes, which wasted his supplies and provisions. He chased them into the mountains and subjugated half of them. By the time he arrived in Turuba, he had enough supplies and provisions for only three days.

The Ottomans immediately attacked the town, but the Saudis held firm and repulsed the attack, being animated by the speeches and exhortations of Ghaliyya, while the Ottomans were already exhausted by previous combat with the hostile tribes. Tusun ordered a second attack the next day but the Ottoman soldiers openly refused his orders. His officers reported that the troops were exhausted and urged a retreat towards Taif. The Saudis, aware of what was happening, chased the retreating Ottomans and attacked them during their march, killing many of them and forcing them to abandon their baggage and guns.

The Ottomans lost seven hundred men during the retreat and many more died from lack of water and supplies. The army was saved from destruction by a hundred cavalry. The Saudis were unable to withstand the cavalry charge and retreated back to Turuba. The battle had lasted four days.

== Aftermath ==
Saud's forces resumed harassing the Pasha's caravans and began cutting lines of communication between Mecca and Medina, weakening the Ottoman position and gaining advantage for the Saudis. The city eventually capitulated to the Ottomans in early 1815, when Saud's Wahhabis abandoned the city four days after their loss in the Battle of Byssel.
