= Qishla of Jeddah =

Castle in Jeddah, Saudi Arabia, built in 1525 for the Ottoman army

Coordinates: 21°29′27″N 39°11′19″E

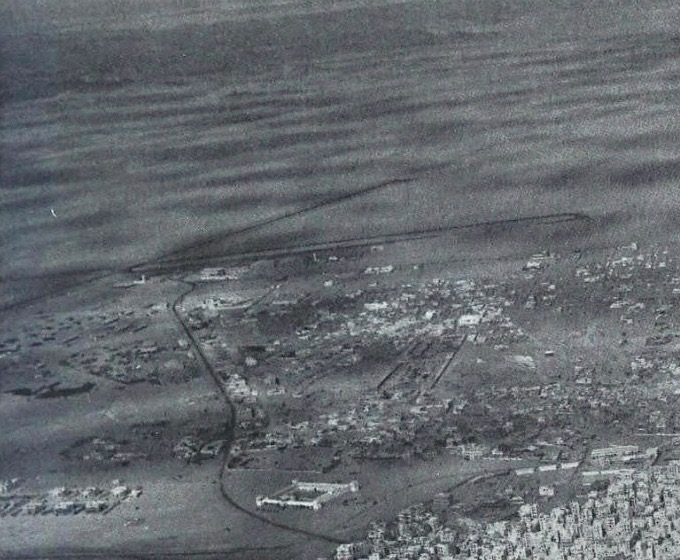
The Qishla of Jeddah can be seen at the bottom center of the 1952 aerial photo.

The Qishla of Jeddah (Arabic: قشلة جدة; Hejazi Arabic pronunciation: [ɡɪʃ.ˈlat ˈdʒɪd.da]) is a historical edifice in Jeddah, Saudi Arabia, built in 1525 to be a military castle of the Ottoman army. Today, the ruins of the castle lay beneath the Jeddah branch of the ministry of defense.

Qishla (modern Turkish: Kışla) is a Turkish word meaning "barracks".

== See also ==
- List of castles in Saudi Arabia
