= Expedition to Najd (1817–1818) =

Egyptian military conflicts

- Part of the Ottoman–Wahhabi war
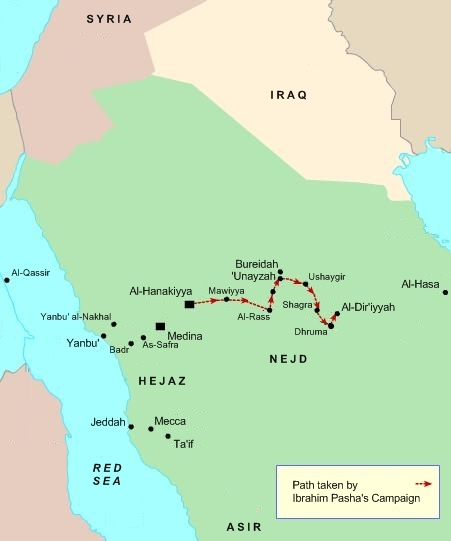
- Ibrahim Pasha's march in Najd
Date	29 September 1817 – 9 September 1818
Location	Najd, Central Arabia
Result	Egyptian-Ottoman victory; Execution of Abdullah I
Territorial changes	End of the Emirate of Diriyah

Belligerents
Ottoman Empire; Eyalet of Egypt	Emirate of Diriyah

Commanders and leaders
(Ottoman Empire) Mahmud II (Ottoman Empire) Ibrahim Pasha (Ottoman Empire) Muhammad Ali Pasha	Abdullah I (executed)

Strength
8,000 men 6,000 camels	Unknown

Casualties and losses
4,700 total killed	200 in Mawiyyah; 70 or 160 in Ar Rass; 800 killed and 3,000 captured in Dhurma; 1,300 in Diriyah

The Najd Expedition (Turkish: Nejd Seferi) was a multi-battle campaign waged by Ottoman Egypt from 1817 to 1818. It was part of Third Campaign of the Ottoman–Wahhabi War of 1811 to 1818, which was the final campaign on the war. It was commanded by Ibrahim Pasha, son of Egyptian ruler Muhammad Ali Pasha, by order of Ottoman Sultan Mahmud II. The goal was to end the Emirate of Diriyah and capture the capital city of Diriyah, through no real strategy other than brute force.

== Background of the Ottoman - Wahhabi War ==
Main Article: Background of the Ottoman–Wahhabi war

The emir of Diriyah, Muhammad bin Saud Al Muqrin, was influenced by Muhammad ibn Abd al-Wahhab and allowed him to stay in his capital. There, he preached his call to many of the tribes of Najd. He also began preaching to areas outside Najd. The new ruler, Abdulaziz bin Muhammad Al Saud, began an era of expansion of the Emirate until it reached the borders of Iraq and Hejaz. Hejaz then fell under the rule of Saud's Wahhabis. They then marched to Karbala and sacked it, triggering the Ottoman–Wahhabi war.

== Prelude ==
After the Battle of Byssel, Saudi power broke, and the Ottomans successfully recaptured the south of Hejaz, subduing the Zahran and 'Asir tribes. These defeats prompted Abdullah bin Saud Al Saud to ask for a peace treaty with the Ottomans, which the governor of Egypt, Muhammad Ali Pasha, accepted. Muhammad Ali then returned to Egypt to deal with internal issues such as the conspiracy of Latif Pasha. Muhammad Ali left his son, Tusun Pasha, in Hejaz with a large army to invade Najd, and the peace treaty he made with the Saudis was to be over.

However, Tusun Pasha returned to Egypt as well to deal with the Albanian soldiers who had been wreaking havoc in Cairo. Arriving there on November 8, 1815, he was well greeted. Muhammad Ali Pasha then prepared a large expedition that took 6 months and gave the command to his son, Ibrahim Pasha. Ibrahim Pasha then prepared 6,000 camels for the expedition. He arrived in Yanbu on September 29. The Ottoman army had a force of 8,000 men from Turkey, Albania, and North Africa.

== Course of the Expedition ==
=== March to Medina and Al Hinakiyah ===
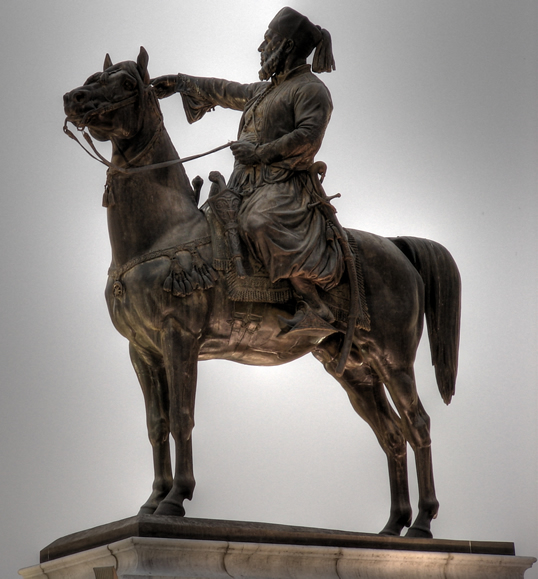
Ibrahim Pasha, Opera Square, Cairo, Egypt

After reaching Yanbu, Ibrahim Pasha marched to Medina and stayed there, He then marched to Sowaidrah, north of Medina, and took it as a base, but he had to suffer during his march since the majority of the tribes had allied with the Saudis and began attacking caravans between Sowaidrah and naval bases. Ibrahim then sent a force of 1,000 men to fight them and defeat them, which he succeeded in doing.

After this defeat, the Arab tribes began siding with the Ottomans and promised to assist them by providing camels. Ibrahim then moved to Al Hinakiyah and fortified it; he took it as a base and began moving to Ar Rass.

=== Battle of Mawiyya ===
Abdullah bin Saud Al Saud then began preparing his army to resist Ibrahim; he left Diriyah and took Ar Rass as his base to meet the Ottomans. He heard the Ottoman forces were marching to Mawiyyha near Al Hinakiyah. Arriving there, Abdullah attacked them in the morning near Mawiyyah. The Ottomans were surprised and were forced to retreat to their camp; however, the Saudis chased them, and once they got near the Ottoman camp, they began bombarding the Saudis, which put them on the route. The Saudis lost 200 men in this battle, and Abdullah was forced to retreat to Unaizah.

=== Siege of Ar Rass ===
After their victory in Mawiyyah, the Ottomans marched to Ar Rass and besieged it. Ibrahim then prepared his cannons and invested the fort. Ar Rass was well fortified, but the fort was heavily besieged for 3 months and 27 days. Ibrahim would encourage his troops to scale the walls, and the Saudis would repair the damage. The Ottomans assaulted the fort three times but were repulsed with heavy casualties. The Saudis bravely defended the fort and the Ottomans fired 5,000 shots into the city. The Ottomans began suffering from the siege due to low ammunition and supplies. Seeing the bad situation in the army, Ibrahim then negotiated with the Saudis to stop the fighting. He negotiated with them to raise the siege in exchange for the fort putting down their weapons and remaining neutral in the war. They would be spared, to which they agreed. another condition imposed was that if Unaziah had fallen to Ibrahim, Ar Rass would fall for them.

The Ottomans have lost 600 or 2400 men while the Saudis lost 70 or 160 killed.

=== Capture of Al Khabra' and Unaizah ===
After the Siege of Ar Rass, Ibrahim marched to Al Khabra' and bombarded it for several hours until it surrendered; the Ottomans rested there for 21 days. Ibrahim then moved to Unaizah, where Abdullah had fled from the city, and after a siege for six days, Unaizah surrendered after its commander Muhammad bin Hassan negotiated with Ibrahim to leave unharmed in exchange for leaving their weapons; Ibrahim agreed.

The fall of Unaizah was a strategic victory for the Ottomans. Abdullah then retreated to Shaqra and then Diriyah.

=== March to Shaqraa ===
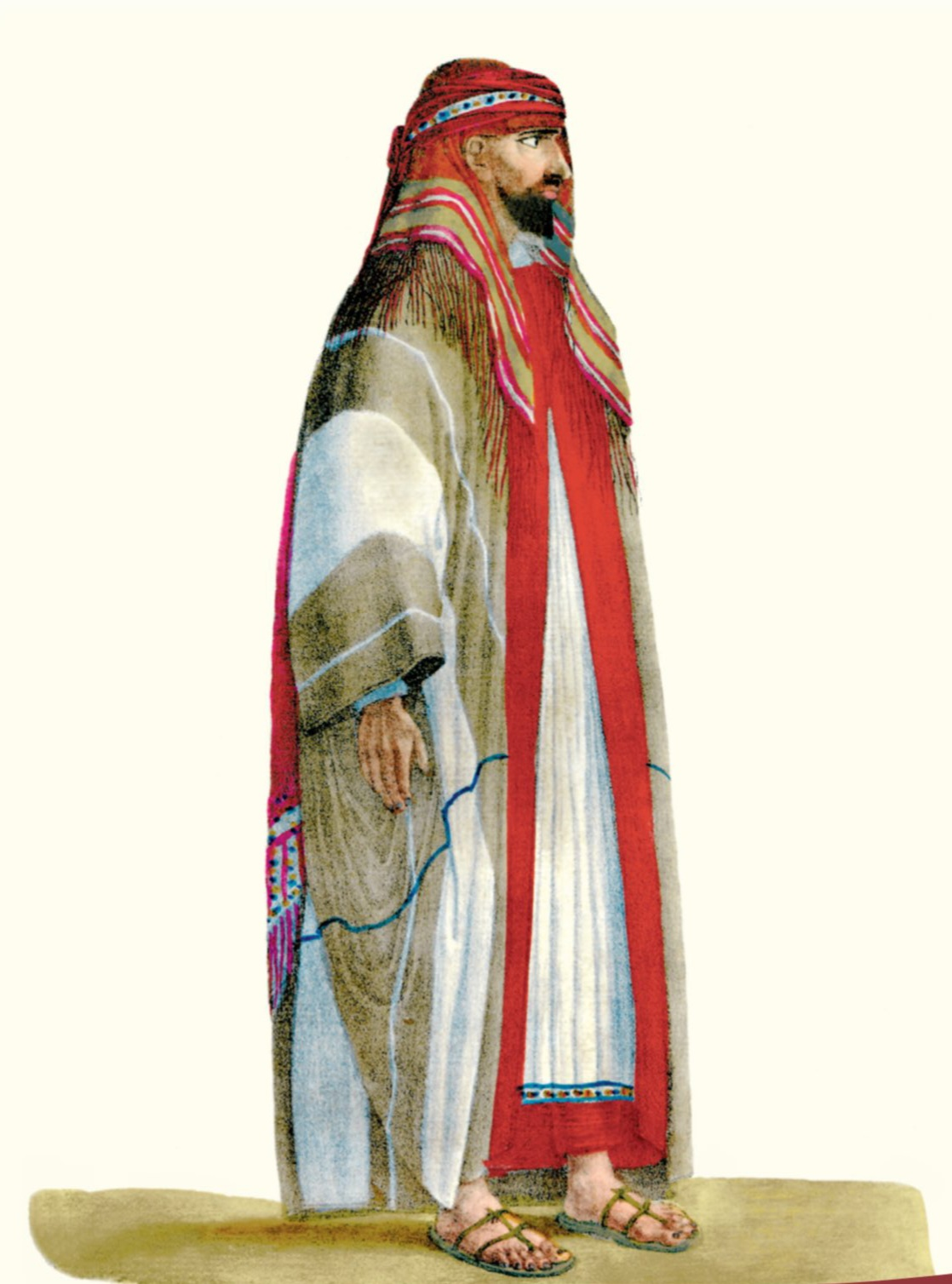
Drawing of Abdullah I

Ibrahim Pasha then resumed his march in October 1817. He reached Buraidah and skirmished with the fort until it surrendered. The commander, Hajilan bin Hamad, along with other inhabitants, obeyed Ibrahim. The Ottomans stayed in Buraidah for two months, during which they received reinforcements from Egypt. Ibrahim resumed his march in late December, during which Al Mithnab, Ushaiger, and Al Fara' surrendered to the ottomans.

Arriving at Shaqraa on January 13, 1818, he besieged it from the north and south; the garrison then attacked them, resulting in a fierce battle in which many ottomans were killed; however, the garrison was overwhelmed, and the leader, Hamad bin Yahya, was wounded and retreated back to the fort. Ibrahim then began bombarding from the north so heavily that it terrified the surrounding villages, but seeing the low damage it inflicted, he then moved the cannons near the wall, which destroyed a portion of it. The Ottomans assaulted the walls, but the garrison held firm and repulsed them.

The siege didn't last long and the garrison left the fort in exchange for their lives, to which he agreed.

=== Siege of Dhurma and massacre ===
In January 1818, Ibrahim marched to Dhurma fortress; the fort was well fortified with men and supplies. Ibrahim began inspecting the fort, then went to the eastern side of the fort and began besieging it. The Ottomans bombarded and assaulted the walls, resulting in a fierce battle in which the Ottomans were repulsed. Ibrahim attempted to negotiate with the garrison but failed.

The Ottomans kept bombarding the walls, and it is said they fired 5,300 shots into the fort. The Ottomans attacked again but were repulsed with a loss of 600 men. The garrison began rebuilding the destroyed portions of the walls. Ibrahim then besieged the fort from the south, where it was led by Mut'ab bin 'Aafisan. Ibrahim then bombarded the section of the fort and attacked the fort once again. The Ottomans succeeded in capturing the fort, and they began entering it from all sides.

The Ottomans began killing the inhabitants in the shops and houses; the fighting still continued in the street, where many Ottomans were killed; however, the Ottomans would trick the surrendered men by taking their weapons and killing them, and the fort was sacked. The Ottomans looted money, weapons, cattle, clothes, and pieces of baggage. The fort was left uninhabited. Ibrahim then captured 3,000 women and children and sent them to Diriyah.

The massacre resulted in the deaths of 800 men; the fort originally had 1,200 men. Ibrahim Pasha spent two months in the fort and left Dhuruma on March 22.

=== Siege of Diriryah ===
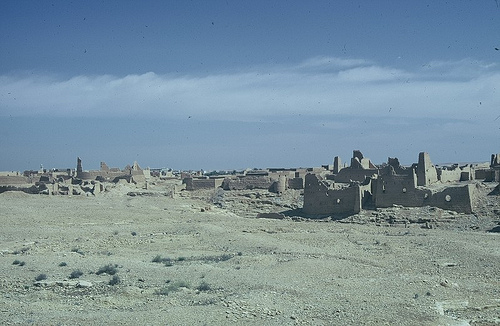
Ruins from Diriyah's destruction

Ibrahim Pasha arrived at the gates of Diriyah with 2,000 cavalrymen, 4,300 Turkish and Albanian soldiers, 1,300 Maghrebi cavalrymen, 150 gunners with around 15 guns, 20 weapons technicians and 11 sappers'. After the total destruction of his capital and its fortifications Abdullah surrendered to the Ottomans on September 11. Ibrahim Pasha's troops plundered Diriyah and massacred several Wahhabi ulama.

== See also ==
- Expedition to Najd (1836)
- Najd
- Emirate of Najd
