= Ajyad Fortress =

Ottoman historical citadel in Mecca (1780–2002)

Coordinates: 21°25′08″N 39°49′35″E

- Interactive map of Ajyad Fortress
- Type: Fort
- Location: Mecca, Saudi Arabia

History
- Built: 1780
- Demolished: 1–9 January 2002

The Ajyad Fortress (Arabic: قلعة أجياد; Hejazi Arabic pronunciation: [qal.ʕat ʔadʒ.jaːd]) was an 18th century Ottoman-era citadel which stood on a hill overlooking the Grand Mosque of Mecca, in what is now Saudi Arabia. Built in the late 18th century, it was demolished by the Saudi government in 2002 for commercial development of the Abraj Al Bait, sparking protests from Turkey and other concerned Muslims of the world.

== History ==
The fortress was built in 1780 under Ottoman rule (later Hejaz vilayet) to protect the Kaaba in Mecca from bandits and invaders. The fort covered some 23,000 m^{2} (250,000 sq ft) on Bulbul Mountain (a spur of Jebel Kuda) overlooking the Masjid al-Haram from the south.

From 1 to 9 January 2002 the Ajyad Fortress was demolished and most of Bulbul mount was leveled, to clear the area for the $15 billion construction project. The project involved the development of the hotel complex of Abraj Al-Bait (The Clock Towers), designed to accommodate up to 65,000 residents. Located in close proximity to Masjid Al-Haram, the complex was developed to serve the millions of Muslim pilgrims who visit Mecca throughout the year.

== Reactions ==
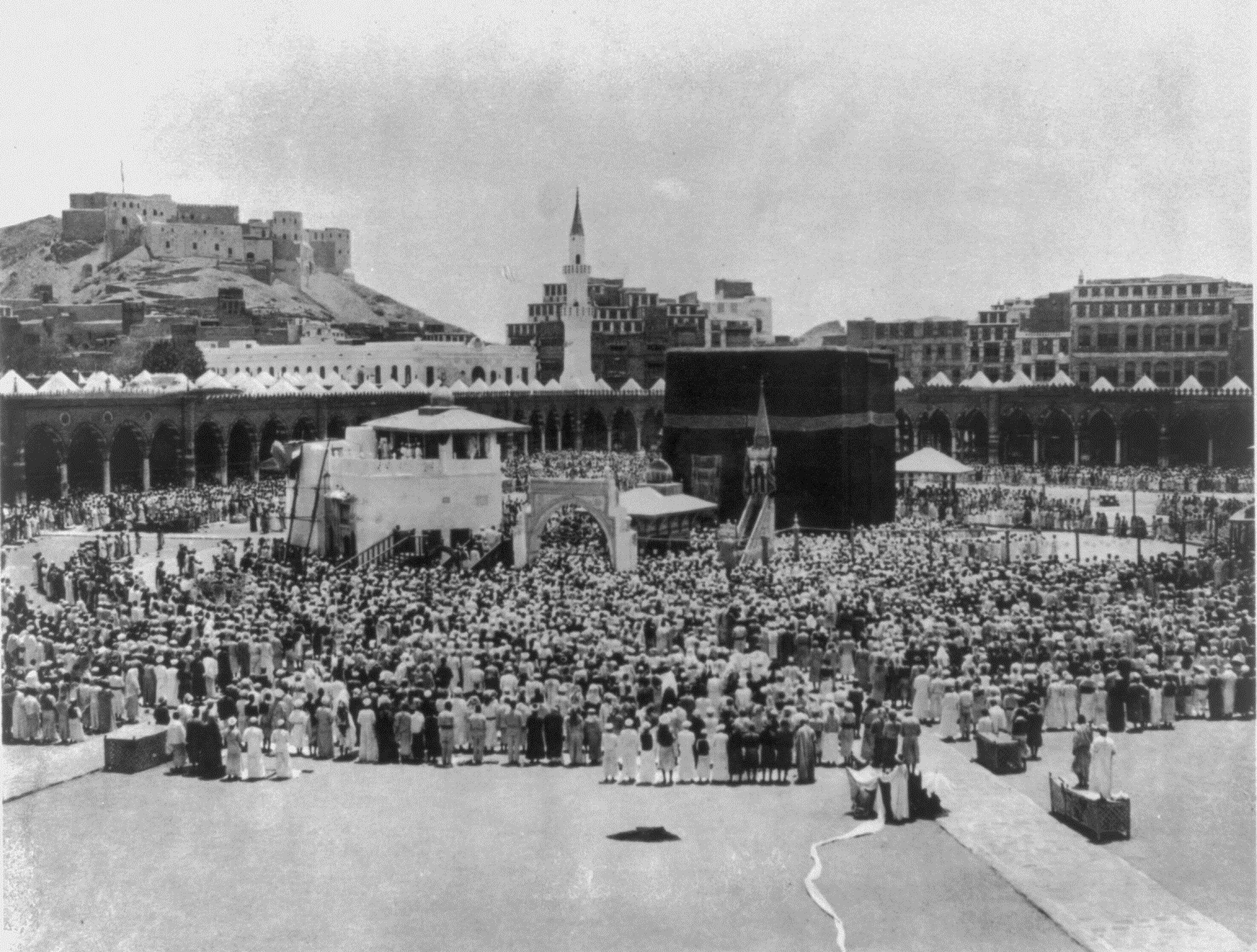
The Ajyad Fortress in the background of the Kaaba, in 1889.

The destruction of the historic structure stirred both domestic and international protest. The Turkish Foreign Minister İsmail Cem İpekçi as well as several institutions tried to prevent the demolition. The Turkish Democratic Left Party (DSP) Deputy Ertuğrul Kumcuoğlu even suggested a boycott on travelling to Saudi Arabia. The Turkish Ministry of Culture and Tourism condemned the obliteration of the fortress, comparing the act to the destruction of the Buddhas of Bamiyan, and accusing the Saudi authorities of "continuing with their policy of demolishing Ottoman heritage sites".

The French news agency Agence France-Presse (AFP) quoted Saudi Islamic affairs Minister Saleh al-Shaikh as saying "no-one has the right to interfere in what comes under the state's authority". In reference to the housing component of the plan, al-Sheikh added that it was intended to house pilgrims to Mecca, and said "this is in the interest of Muslims all over the world". Arab commenters are dismissive of the protests against the destruction, and ascribed them to a residual bitterness on the loss of the Arabian peninsula by the Ottoman Empire.

However, the destruction of this and other historic sites fueled criticism of the Saudis, and plans were made to rebuild the castle, as ordered by the King in 2001:

King Fahd has given his approval for the King Abdul Aziz Endowment for the Holy Haram and for the preparation of the project site by removing the hill and the castle. The king instructed that the castle should be preserved in full by rebuilding it," the minister said.

A 1/25 scale model of the fortress is included along with other architectural models at the Miniatürk miniature park in Istanbul, Turkey.

== See also ==
- List of castles in Saudi Arabia
- Qishla of Mecca
