= Capture of Al-Hinakiyah =

Saudi recapture of Al Hinakiyah, 19th century

- Part of the Ottoman–Wahhabi war
Date	April 1813
Location	Al-Hinakiyah, Medina
Result	Wahhabi victory

Belligerents
Ottoman Empire; Eyalet of Egypt; Harb tribe	Emirate of Diriyah

Commanders and leaders
Osman Kashif	Saud bin Abdulaziz

Strength
300 men	20,000 men

Casualties and losses
30+	Unknown

The Capture of Al-Hinakiyah was a military engagement in the Ottoman–Wahhabi war between the Emirate of Diriyah's Wahhabi army led by Saud bin Abdulaziz and an Ottoman garrison stationed at Al Hinakiyah.

== Capture ==
In the late of Rabi' al-Thani (April), Saud bin Abdulaziz, with a large army of 20,000 men, marched against the Ottoman-occupied fort of Al Hinakiyah, having already been captured by them after the Capture of Medina in late 1812. Al Hinaiyah fortress lies twenty leagues before Medina, and the Ottoman garrison was supported by the Harb tribe. Saud then decided to face off against the enemy tribe before heading to Al Hinakiya. Saud successfully captured the tribe's village, and the majority of them escaped. Saud looted their houses and captured their furniture.

Saud marched to Al Hinakiyah; the Ottoman fort had 300 men and was led by Osman Kashif; the Ottomans resisted for some time but were forced to capitulate to the larger Saudi forces; and the garrison was promised a safe passage to Iraq, in which Saud gave his word and ordered Muhammad Bin Ali with some force to escort them safely there. Saud then marched to Medina and began raiding the Harb tribes. He then reached Mount Uhud where he met an Ottoman cavalry force and defeated them, killing thirty of them.

== Aftermath ==
The military situation changed significantly. Ottoman defeats at Al Hinakiyah and Turubah weakened their position. Saud's Wahhabi troops responded to this by continually attacking along the border and the Ottomans suffered further tactical defeats.
