= Abdullah bin Saud Al Saud =

Last ruler of the Emirate of Diriyah (r. 1814–1818)

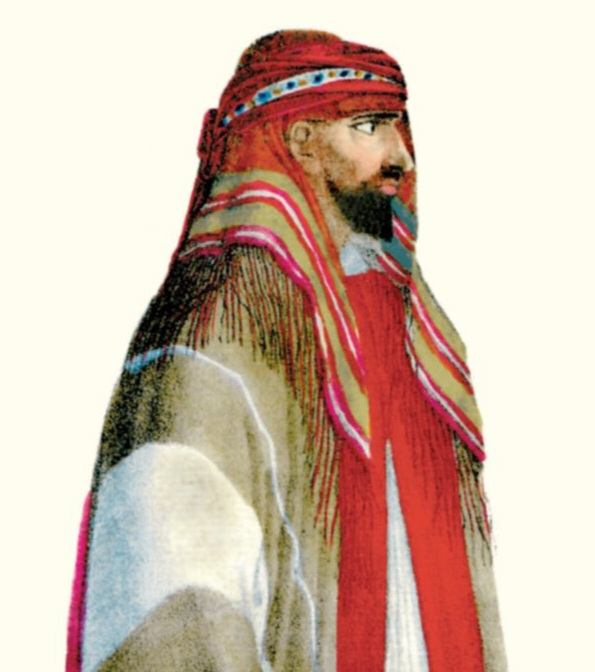
- Portrait in the book History of Egypt under the government of Mohammed Ali (1823) published by Félix Mengin

Emir of Diriyah
- Reign: May 1814 – 1818
- Predecessor: Saud bin Abdulaziz bin Muhammad
- Successor: Post abolished
- Died: May 1819; Istanbul, Ottoman Empire
- Issue: Saud; Muhammad
Names
- Abdullah bin Saud bin Abdulaziz
- House: Al Saud
- Father: Saud bin Abdulaziz bin Muhammad

Abdullah bin Saud Al Saud (Arabic: عبد الله بن سعود آل سعود, romanized: ʿAbd Allāh bin Suʿūd Āl Suʿūd; died May 1819) was the last ruler of the First Saudi State, from 1814 to 1818, and was executed in Istanbul under the Ottoman Empire. Although the Ottomans maintained several garrisons in the Nejd thereafter, they were unable to prevent the rise of the Emirate of Nejd, also known as the Second Saudi State, led by Turki bin Abdullah.

== Early life ==
Abdullah was the eldest son of Saud bin Abdulaziz, who declared him as the heir apparent in 1805. Abdullah's first military command was in 1811. In his second command he fought against the Egyptians in 1812, and was unable to prevent them from ultimately recapturing Hejaz. Following his failure, Saud bin Abdulaziz took back the command, which delayed the capture of the region.

== Reign ==
Abdullah succeeded his father, Saud, in May 1814. At the beginning of his reign, Abdullah faced intra-family challenges from his uncle Abdullah bin Muhammad, but managed to settle these problems.

His father had initiated a war with the Ottoman Empire with the capture of Hejaz, which was regained by the Ottomans in 1813. Because of his father's conquest, Abdullah immediately had to face an invasion of his domains by an Ottoman-Egyptian army under the command of Ibrahim Pasha, the son of Muhammad Ali Pasha. The Ottoman forces began their campaign by quickly recapturing Mecca and Medina. Heavily outnumbered and under-equipped, the forces of Diriyah Emirate were defeated in 1815 and retreated to their stronghold of Najd. Following the battle, Muhammad Ali sent a letter to Abdullah requesting his submission and, in May 1815, an agreement was made which terminated Abdullah's claims over two Islamic holy cities, Mecca and Medina, and recognised the supremacy of the Ottoman caliph. Between 1814 and 1816 Abdullah had to deal with the concerns of the British regarding piracy coming from the Qasimi region. Abdullah sent several letters to William Bruce who was the British resident in Bushehr to inform him that the Emirate did not involve in any such event.

Rather than engage the Ottomans in open battle, Abdullah decided to attempt to weather the invasion by fortifying his forces in the Najd towns in 1816. As a result, Ibrahim took the villages of Najd one by one, sacking any town that resisted. Ibrahim finally reached the Saudi capital at Diriyah. After a siege lasting several months, Abdullah finally surrendered on 9 September 1818, marking the end of the Saudi state.

== Fall of the Emirate ==
Ibrahim systematically razed Diriyah and sent many members of the Al Saud clan into captivity in Egypt and Constantinople, the Ottoman Empire. Three brothers of Abdullah and eighteen Al Saud members were killed. Abdullah, his three sons and two of his supporters were brought to Cairo in November 1818.

== Execution ==
After a six-month stay in Cairo, Abdullah was transferred to Constantinople by Muhammad Ali Pasha, with a recommendation for a pardon. This was refused by Sultan Mahmud II and, in May 1819, he and his two supporters were publicly beheaded in the square before Hagia Sophia for their acts in some Islamic holy cities and mosques. Hakan Özoğlu and Altan Tan argue that Abdullah's four sons were also beheaded with him. Prior to his execution, Abdullah, who had forbidden listening to music, was forced to listen to the lute.

=== Reasons for his execution ===
In 1802, during the Wahhabi sack of Karbala, the mausoleum of Husayn ibn Ali was desecrated by the army of Abdullah bin Saud, causing anger and shock in the Muslim world. As a result, the Ottoman authorities saw themselves in a situation that they had to punish the Saudis for their acts. The guardian of Islam's religious places was the Ottoman Sultan in Constantinople, Mahmud II, who ordered that an Egyptian force be sent to the Arabian Peninsula to defeat Abdullah bin Saud and his allies. In 1818, an Egyptian army led by Ibrahim Pasha led a siege on their capital, Diriyah, in Najd. Abdullah eventually surrendered. Abdullah bin Saud was taken along with two of his supporters who were then sent to Cairo and then to Constantinople where they were executed on the orders of Mahmud II.

Preceded by Saud bin Abdulaziz	Imam of First Saudi State; 1814–1818	Vacant Title next held by Turki bin Abdullah Next known title holder: Imam of Second Saudi State
