= Al Qunfudhah =

Al-Qunfudhah Arabic: ٱلْقُنْفُذَة, romanized: Al-Qunfuḏah
- City
- Nickname: The Ghadah of the South
- Location in Saudi Arabia Al-Qunfudhah (Middle East) Al-Qunfudhah (West and Central Asia)
- Coordinates: 19°7′35″N 41°4′44″E
- Country: Saudi Arabia
- Province: Makkah (Mecca)
- Joined Saudi Arabia: 1925

Government
  - City Governor: Fadha Al Bogami

Population (2022 census)
  - City: 42,447 (Al Qunfudhah town)
  - Metro: 205,188 (Al Qunfudhah governate)
- Time zone: UTC+3 (EAT)
  - Summer (DST): UTC+3 (EAT)
- Postal Code: (5 digits)
- Area code: +966-17

Al Qunfudhah (Arabic: ٱلْقُنْفُذَة, romanized: Al-Qunfuḏah), also known as Kunfuda, is a Saudi city in the region of the Tihamah on the coast of the Red Sea. Its population is the fourth largest in Makkah Province. the area of the governate is estimated at 5,195 km^{2}.

== History ==
The Ottoman Empire and Kingdom of Italy fought a naval battle off the coast of Al Qunfudhah in 1912. The governor of the Yemen vilayet fled to Al Qunfudhah in July 1914, due to the strength of al-Idrisi's army. Arabs forces took control of the city during the Arab Revolt in 1916.

== Geography and climate ==
Al Qunfudhah has a hot desert climate (BWh) according to the Köppen climate classification. The city has a long summer from March until end October, then a short fall 4 weeks after that a winter or spring that what locals of Al Qunfudhah prefer to call it from November until February.

Climate data for Al-Qunfudhah
Month	Jan	Feb	Mar	Apr	May	Jun	Jul	Aug	Sep	Oct	Nov	Dec	Year
Mean daily maximum °C (°F)	31.3 (88.3)	32.2 (90.0)	34.7 (94.5)	37.8 (100.0)	40.7 (105.3)	42.6 (108.7)	41.8 (107.2)	41.0 (105.8)	40.9 (105.6)	38.4 (101.1)	35.3 (95.5)	32.8 (91.0)	37.5 (99.4)
Daily mean °C (°F)	26.1 (79.0)	26.8 (80.2)	28.9 (84.0)	31.4 (88.5)	33.9 (93.0)	35.8 (96.4)	35.9 (96.6)	35.4 (95.7)	34.4 (93.9)	31.8 (89.2)	29.4 (84.9)	27.2 (81.0)	31.4 (88.5)
Mean daily minimum °C (°F)	21.0 (69.8)	21.4 (70.5)	23.2 (73.8)	25.0 (77.0)	27.2 (81.0)	29.0 (84.2)	30.1 (86.2)	29.9 (85.8)	27.9 (82.2)	25.2 (77.4)	23.6 (74.5)	21.6 (70.9)	25.4 (77.8)
Average precipitation mm (inches)	29 (1.1)	9 (0.4)	12 (0.5)	20 (0.8)	18 (0.7)	8 (0.3)	7 (0.3)	16 (0.6)	15 (0.6)	15 (0.6)	18 (0.7)	24 (0.9)	191 (7.5)
Source: Climate-Data.org

== Population ==
The population of Al Qunfudhah is 205,188 people divided between urban and coastal villages and abandonment, representing about 2.7% of the population of the province, which comes in fourth place of the region after the province of Taif in terms of population from the year 2022 according to the 2022 census.

- Jeddah Population 3,751,722 people.
- Mekkah Population 2,427,924 people.
- Al Ta'if Population 913,374 people.
- AL Qunfudhah Population 205,188 people.

== Universities and academic centers ==
- Umm Al-Qura University ( Al Qunfudhah branch)
- Al Qunfudhah Secondary Industrial Institute
- Scientific Institute of Imam Muhammad bin Saud Islamic University ( Al Qunfudhah branch).

== Regional airport ==
On 5 December 2018, Prince Khalid Al-Faisal the foundation stone for Al Qunfudhah airport. The 24 million square metre airport will provide serves to three regions, seven governorates, and 50 administrative centres. The airport will officially open in 2021.

In 2019 an agreement to establish the airport was signed between the General Authority of Civil Aviation (GACA) and Nesma and Partners Contracting Company. The airport that will have the capacity to accommodate half a million passengers costs a total amount of SR840 million.

== See also ==
- List of cities and towns in Saudi Arabia

== Works cited ==
=== Books ===
- DeLong-Bas, Natana (2022). Islam, Revival, and Reform: Redefining Tradition for the Twenty-First Century. Syracuse University Press. ISBN 9780815637509.

=== Journals ===
- "World Events of the Month". Current History. 4 (5). University of California Press: 783–787. 1916. doi:10.2307/45327859. JSTOR 45327859.
- Power, Edmond (1918). "The National Problem in Arabia". Studies. 7 (27). Messenger of the Sacred Heart: 456–473. doi:10.2307/30093391. JSTOR 30093391.
