= Turubah =

Turubah Arabic: تربة
- Town
- Turabah's location inside Saudi Arabia
- Coordinates: 21°10′12″N 41°36′00″E
- Country: Saudi Arabia
- Province: Makkah Region

Area
  - Total: 7.7 sq mi (20 km^{2})

Population (2021)
  - Total: 100,000

Turabah (Arabic: تربة, also spelled turaba, turba or tarba) is a city in Hejaz in Saudi Arabia, located in the valley of the same name. Turubah is located south of the mountain of Hadhn ("Jebel Hadhn"), to the southeast of Mecca. It is therefore considered on the border between the topographic regions of Hejaz and Najd. The town's traditional inhabitants are the tribe of Al-Bugum. The population of Turubah was 42,810 in 2004, while now in 2020 about 100,000.

== See also ==
- Shanqal Fort
- Battles of Turubah in 1813 and in 1924
- List of cities and towns in Saudi Arabia
- Regions of Saudi Arabia
