= Dafalas =

Village in the UAE

Dafalas ديرة الكداءة (Arabic)
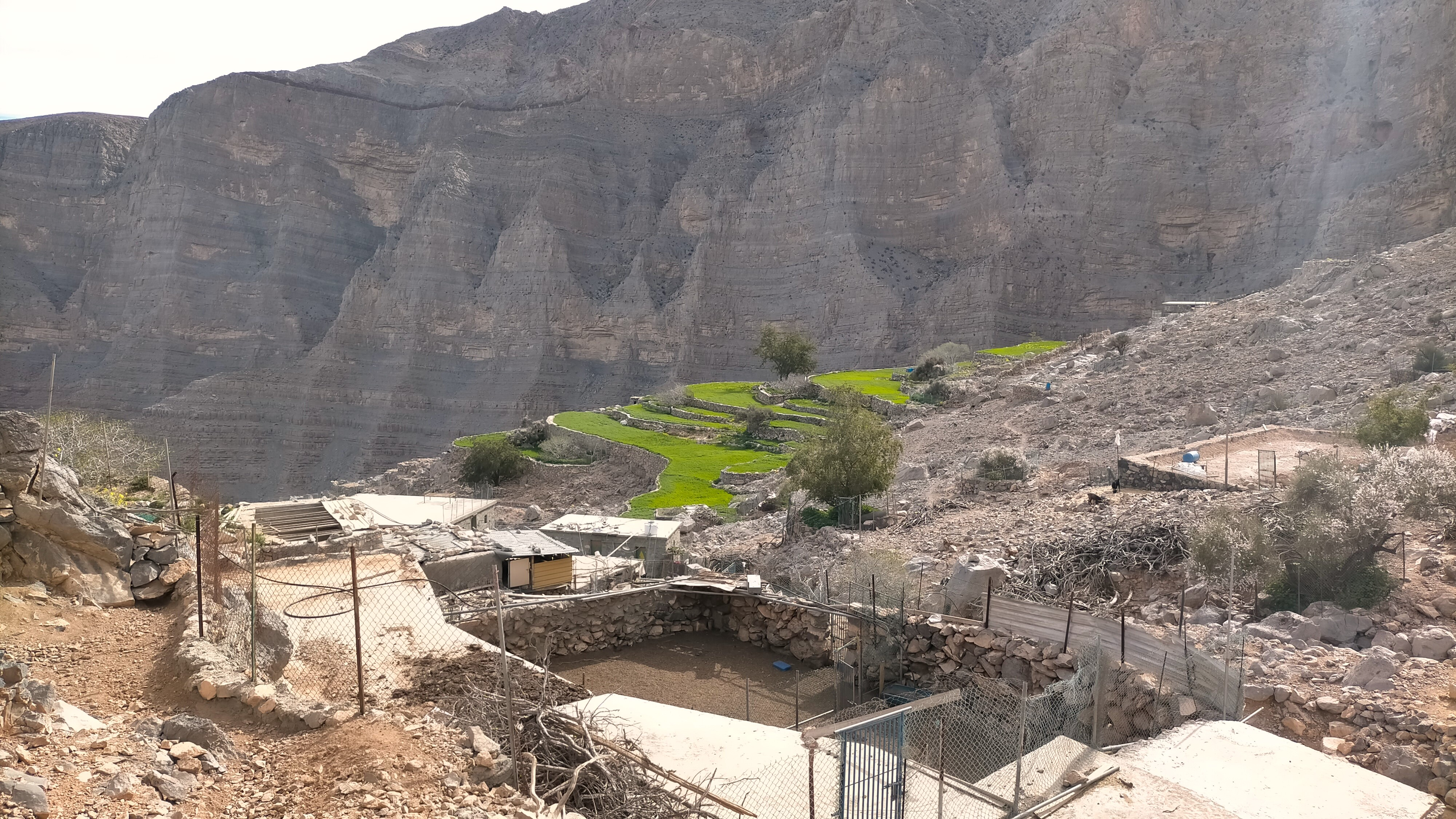
- Dafalas. Village located in the mountains of Ras Al Khaimah (UAE), south of Jabal Ar Rahrah.

- Location within United Arab Emirates Location within Persian Gulf Location within West and Central Asia
- Coordinates: 25°57′06.0″N 56°08′58″E
- Country: United Arab Emirates
- Emirate: Ras Al Khaimah

Area
  - Total: 0.24 km^{2} (0.093 sq mi)
- Elevation: 1,312 m (4,304 ft)
- Time zone: UTC+04:00

Dafalas (Arabic: ديرة دفالس, romanized: Dīrat Dafalas) is a small agricultural and livestock village, located in the northeast of United Arab Emirates (UAE), in the Hajar Mountains, Emirate of Ras Al Khaimah, very close to the border with Oman.

The village is located at the head of the Wadi Barut, tributary of the Wadi Ghalilah, at an approximate average altitude of 1,312 m (4,304 ft), and extends along a small plateau on the northern slope of the Jabal Ar Rahrah (1,691 m (5,548 ft)), highest mountain in the Emirates, located entirely within its territory.

One of the arms of the upper course of the Wadi Barut passes through the village of Dafalas, draining a part of the waters that descend from the Jabal Ar Rahrah Ridge.

This mountain ridge, almost 11 km (6.8 mi) long, delimits the drainage divide between the waters that flow into Wadi Ghalilah, Wadi Rahabah, Wadi Bakhit, and other smaller wadis that flow into the Persian Gulf, and those that flow into Wadi Shah or Wadi Shehah and its tributaries, and which contains, among other peaks, the Jabal Shintal (1,435 m (4,708 ft)), the Jabal Rahabah (1,543 m (5,062 ft)) and the Jabal Naqat (900 m (3,000 ft)).

The village has 30 houses approximately, many of them renovated in a traditional style, and others in the construction phase.

Dafalas has electricity and a drinking water supply, through a power line and a system of water pumping tanks, which arrives from the Wadi Ghalilah; this has facilitated the number of permanent residents in the locality to be much higher than in other mountain villages in the area.

There are also numerous terraces intended for the cultivation of wheat and barley, corrals, and several tanks and small canals intended to collect runoff water, and direct it towards cisterns and crop areas. The livestock herd, made up mainly of goats, is very numerous.

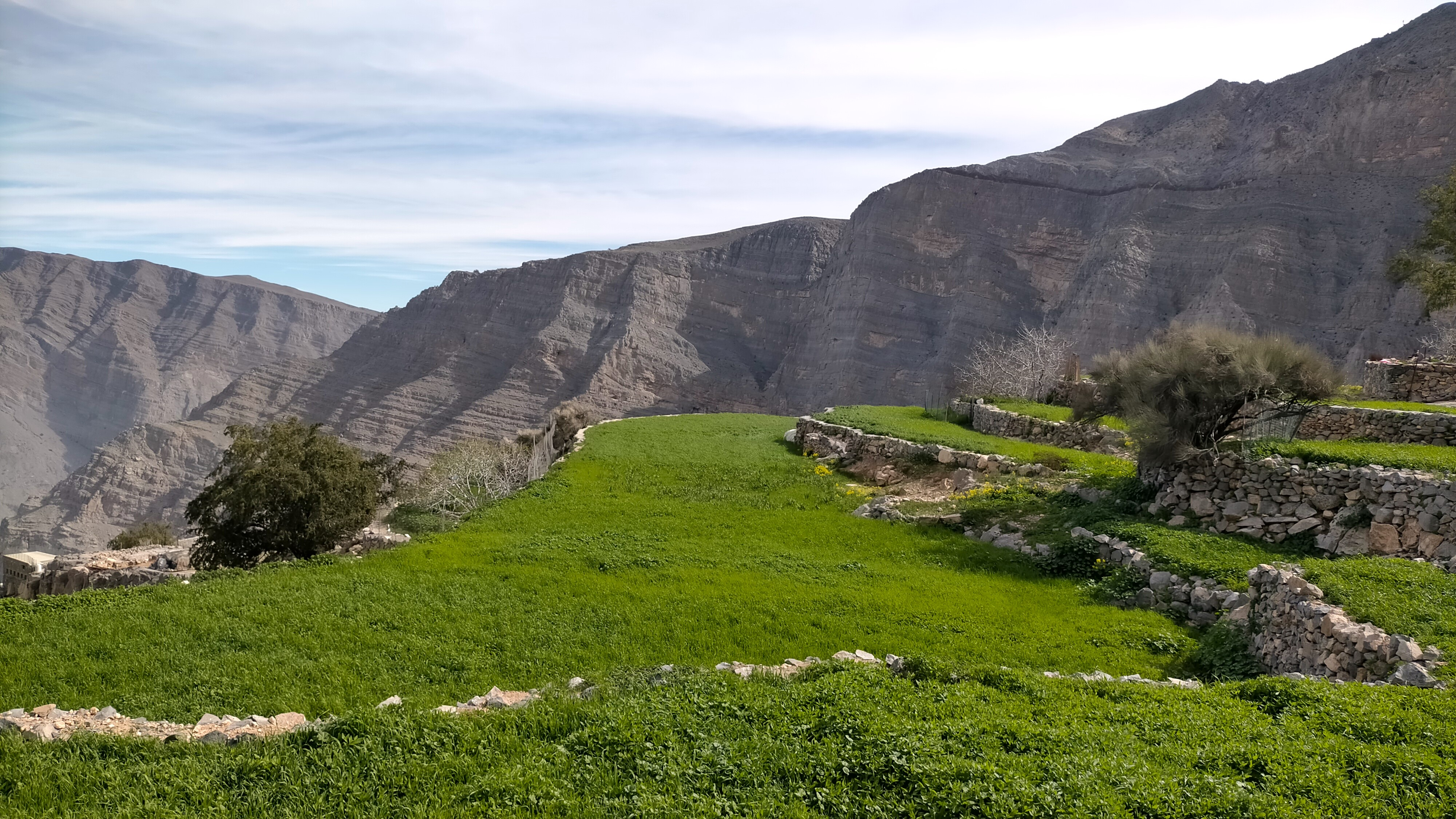
Cultivated terraces in Dafalas

Dafalas can only be accessed by walking or with donkeys, for which there are two trails and donkey paths. One of them, partially cobbled and only one kilometer long, is used as the main access road, since it connects the village with a wide paved road called Jais Road, through which most of the supplies. The second path starts from the Wadi Ghalilah Dam, is 6 km (3.7 mi) long, and has a considerable slope; nonetheless, it is still used as a means of communication with other villages in Wadi Barut and with the populations of Wadi Ghalilah and the city of Ghalilah itself.

This second itinerary has also become, in recent years, one of the most popular routes in Ras Al Khaimah, among fans of hiking and climbing.

== Toponymy ==
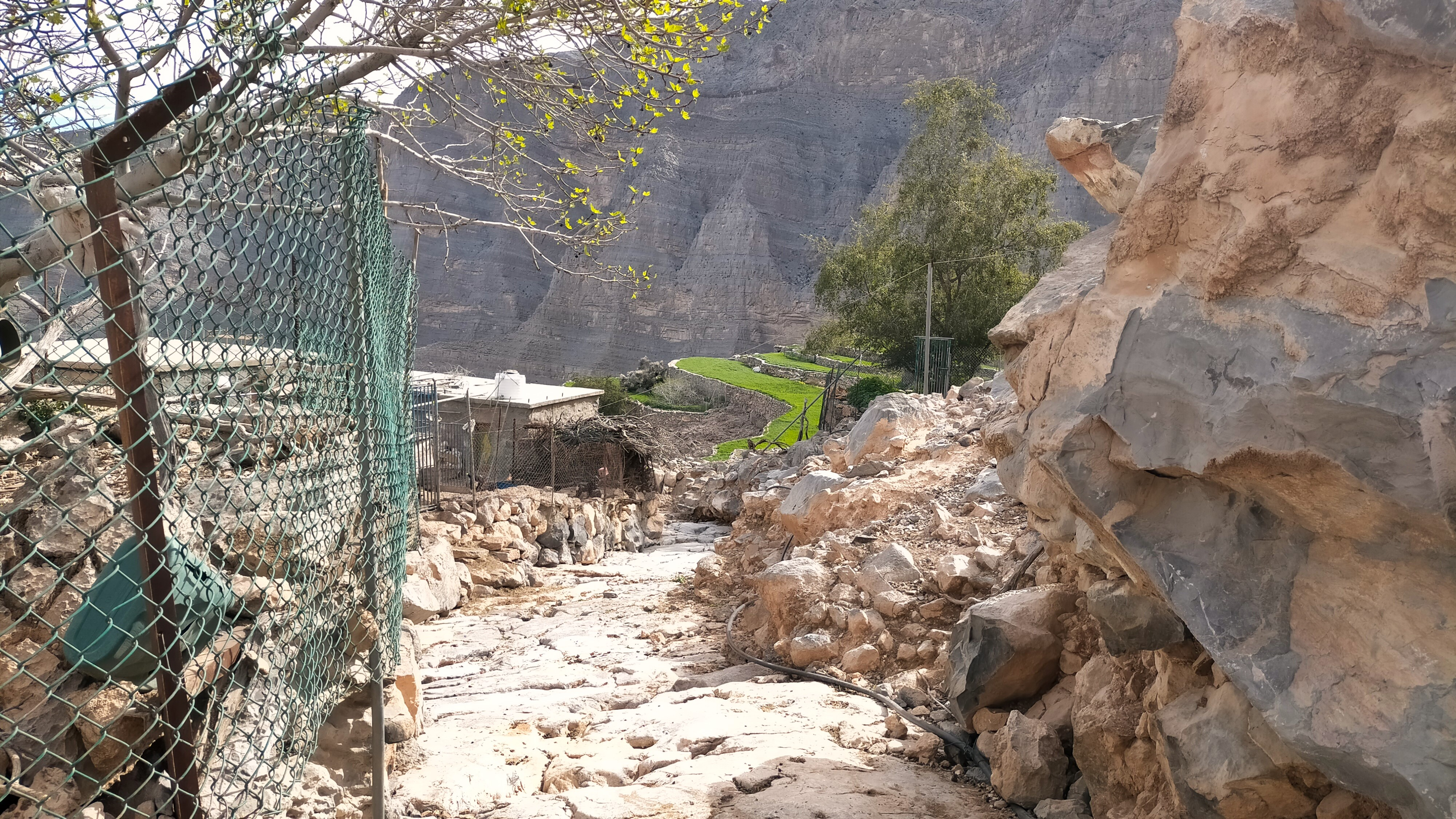
Central area of Dafalas village

Alternative names: Dīrat Dafalas, Dirat Dafalas, Defels, Barut Village.

The name of the village of Dafalas is not mentioned in the documentation and maps prepared between 1950 and 1960 by the British Arabist, cartographer, military officer and diplomat Julian F. Walker, during the work carried out to establish borders between the then called Trucial States, but that of other relevant toponyms in the area (Wadi Barut, Jabal Ar Rahrah, Jabal Shintal, Jabal Rahabah, Wadi Ghalilah, etc.), especially on the 1:100,000 scale map published in 1971 by the United Kingdom Ministry of Defence.

In The National Atlas of the United Arab Emirates it is referenced with the spelling Dīrat Dafalas.

== Population ==
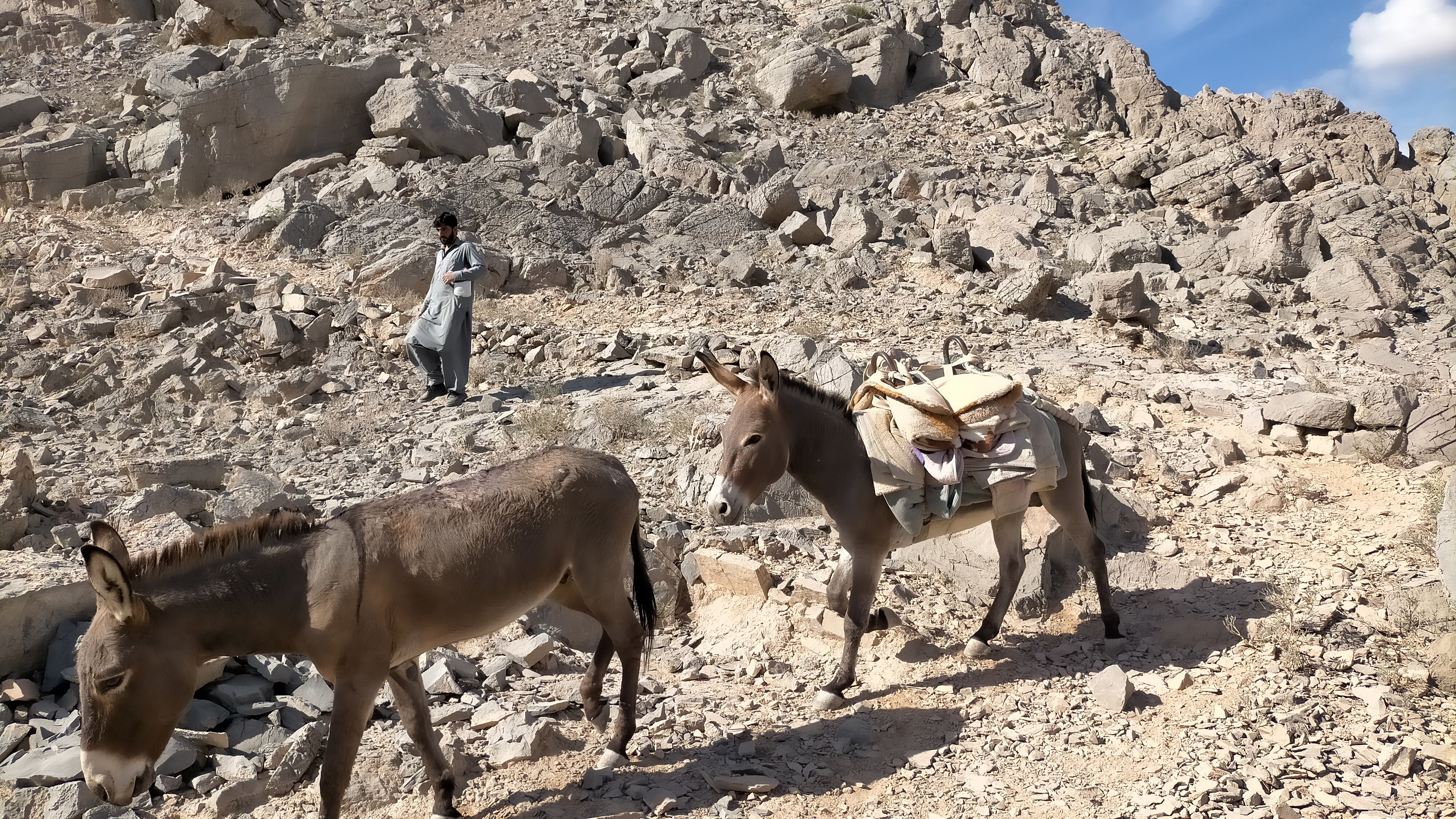
Wadi Barut. Donkey train on the bridle path between Dafalas and Wadi Ghalilah

The geographical area of Dafalas was historically populated by the semi-nomadic tribe Shihuh, section of Bani Shatair (Arabic: بني شطير), which occupied, between other territories, the tribal areas of Bani Bakhit and Banī Sā`ad.

== See also ==
- List of wadis of the United Arab Emirates
- List of mountains in the United Arab Emirates
- List of wadis of Oman
- List of mountains in Oman
