= Wadi Litibah =

Wadi in the UAE

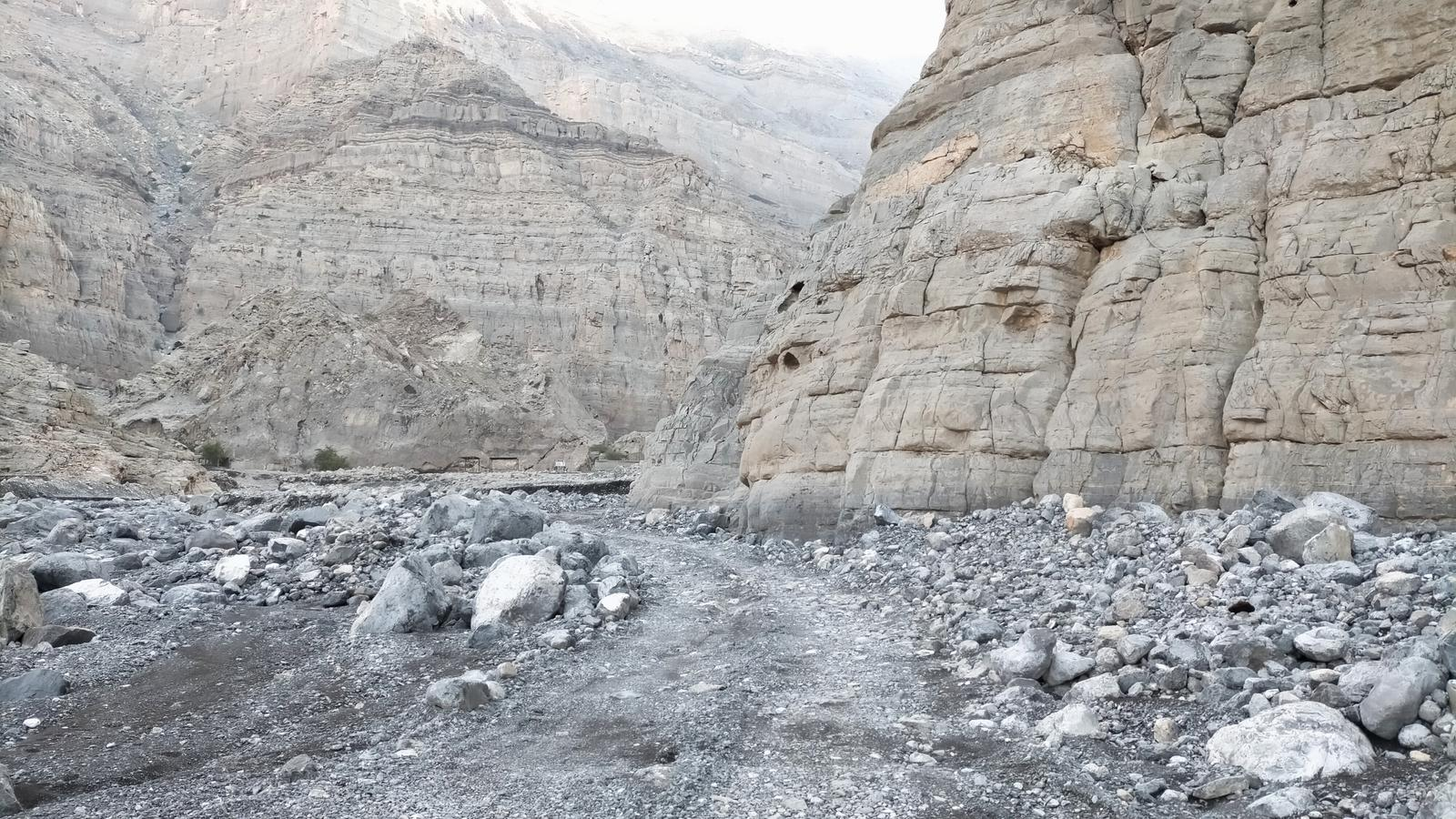
- Wadi Litibah - Tributary of Wadi Ghalilah. Emirate of Ras Al Khaimah (UAE)

- Location within United Arab Emirates Location within Persian Gulf Location within Middle East Location within West and Central Asia
- Native name: وادي ليتيبة (Arabic)

Location
- Country: United Arab Emirates
- Emirate: Ras Al Khaimah

Physical characteristics
- Source: North slope of Jabal Bil Ays (1,911 m) Hajar Mountains
  - elevation: 1,650 m (5,410 ft)
- Mouth: Confluence with the Wadi Barut into the Wadi Ghalilah, at the Wadi Ghalilah Dam
  - coordinates: 25°58′35″N 56°09′02″E
  - elevation: 140 m (460 ft)
- Length: 7 km (4.3 mi)
- Basin size: 76.32 km^{2} (29.47 mi^{2})

Basin features
- River system: Wadi Ghalilah

Wadi Litibah (Arabic: وادي ليتيبة, romanized: Wādī Litibah) is a valley or dry river, with intermittent flow, flowing almost exclusively during the rainy season, located northeast of the United Arab Emirates, in the Emirate of Ras Al Khaimah.

It is a tributary of the Wadi Ghalilah, from its confluence with the Wadi Barut, and is mainly formed by the ravines and torrents which flow downstream north of Jabal Bil Ays / Jebel Jais (1,911 m), divided into two main branches; and by the deep cliffs situated to the west and at the foot of the Jabal as Sayh (1,746 m), on the border between the United Arab Emirates (UAE) and Oman.

== Course ==
In its course, from south to north, and later turning towards the west in its middle course, the Wadi Litibah passes through some terraced cultivation areas, and small widely scattered farms, built on elevated areas in respect to the bed of the ravines, most of them abandoned or semi abandoned, which are accessed by a steep donkey path, with stone steps in some sections, which continues to be used at present for the transit of goods on the backs of donkeys, and which has become very popular as a hiking route, known as the Stairway to Heaven (Righ Bank), which runs between the lower part of the wadi and the Jabal Ar Rahrah Ridge.

One of those villages, located at 1,450 m altitude, is Ras Ash, also known as Ras al Ghash, which has a single inhabitant.

Another popular itinerary, but one of climbing, the Stairway to Heaven (Left Bank), also starts from the lower area of Wadi Litibah and climbs to the top of the vertical cliff that borders it on the east, where the Omani village of Ra's al Waḩḩ is located, continuing on to the south, towards the top of Jebel Jais, to finally reach the Jabal Ar Rahrah Ridge.

In the aforementioned lower area of Wadi Litibah, already located below 260 m altitude, there are two small groups of farms, which can be accessed through a stone and gravel road that follows the same dry bed of the wadi, and leads to its confluence with the Wadi Barut, next to the Wadi Ghalilah Dam, built in 2001.

== Toponymy ==
Alternative Names for the Wadi include Wadi Litibah and Wādī Litibah.

The name Wadi Litibah was recorded in the documentation and maps produced between 1950 and 1960 by the British Arabist, cartographer, military officer, and diplomat Julian F. Walker during the work carried out to establish borders between what was then called Trucial States, later completed by the Ministry of Defence (United Kingdom), on 1:100,000 scale maps published in 1971.

In the political and administrative organization of the Emirate of Ras Al Khaimah, the name of the main wadi is frequently used as an identifying element of the entire territory covered by its drainage basin.

In the case of Wadi Ghalilah, this drainage basin is very large (76.32 km^{2}), comprising numerous towns, villages and farms widely scattered throughout its valleys and mountains. Naturally, it also includes all the ravines and tributaries of the main wadi.

The same denomination is also used for postal purposes.

For this reason, the mistake of considering that this is the only name that corresponds to all the different wadis, and even to some population centers in this region, is widespread, frequently ignoring the true name of each of these places.

This has contributed to Wadi Litibah being incorrectly referred to as Wadi Ghalilah on a few occasions.

== Population ==
The geographical area of Wadi Litibah was historically populated by the semi-nomadic Shihuh tribe, sections of Bani Hadiyah (Arabic: بني هدية) and Bani Shatair (Arabic: بني شطير), which occupied, among others territories, the tribal areas of Ahl Sayḩ and Hammad, respectively.

== Gallery ==
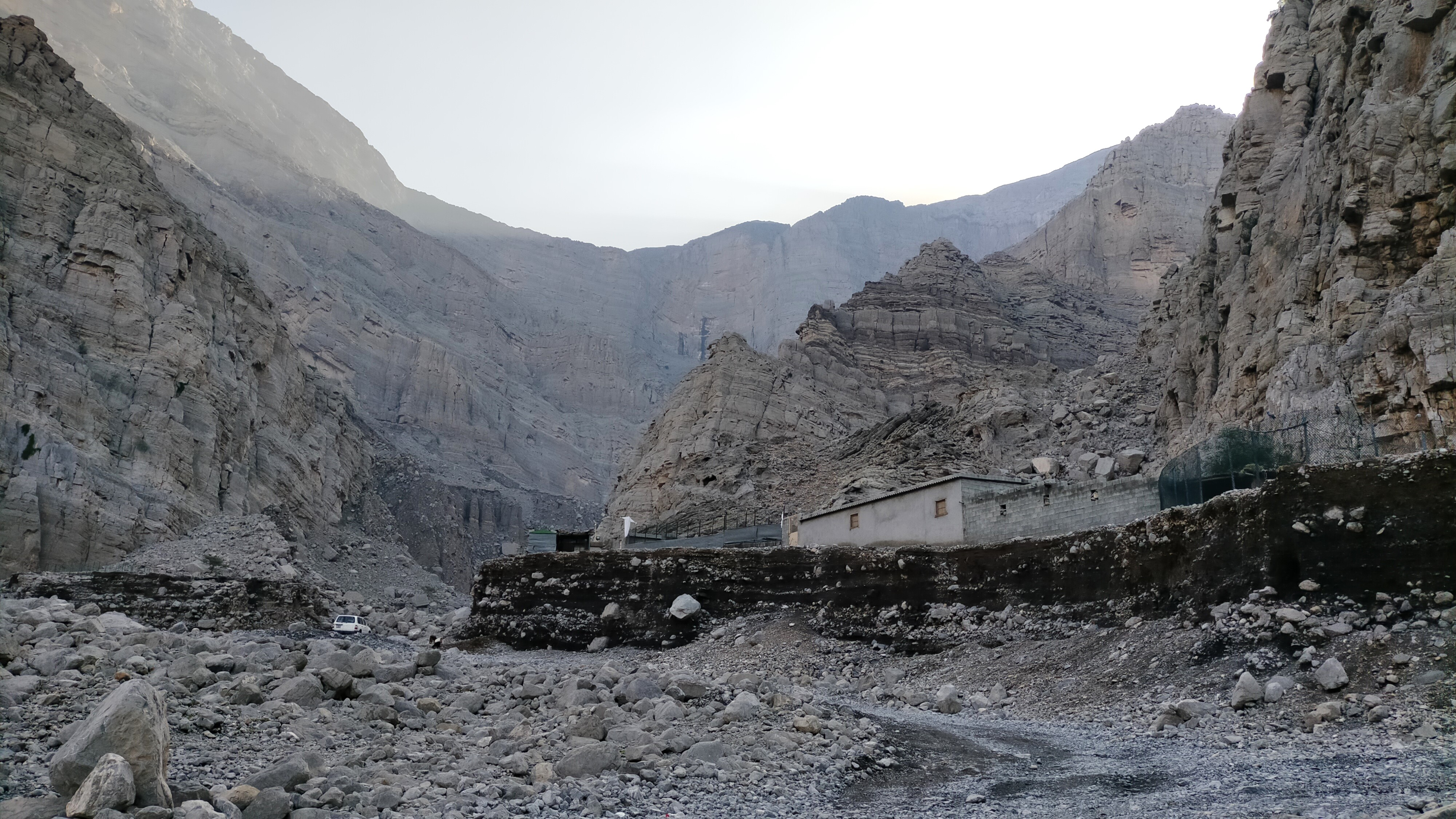
A farm at the bottom of the Wadi Litibah, a tributary of the Wadi Ghalilah. Starting point for the Stairway to Heaven trail

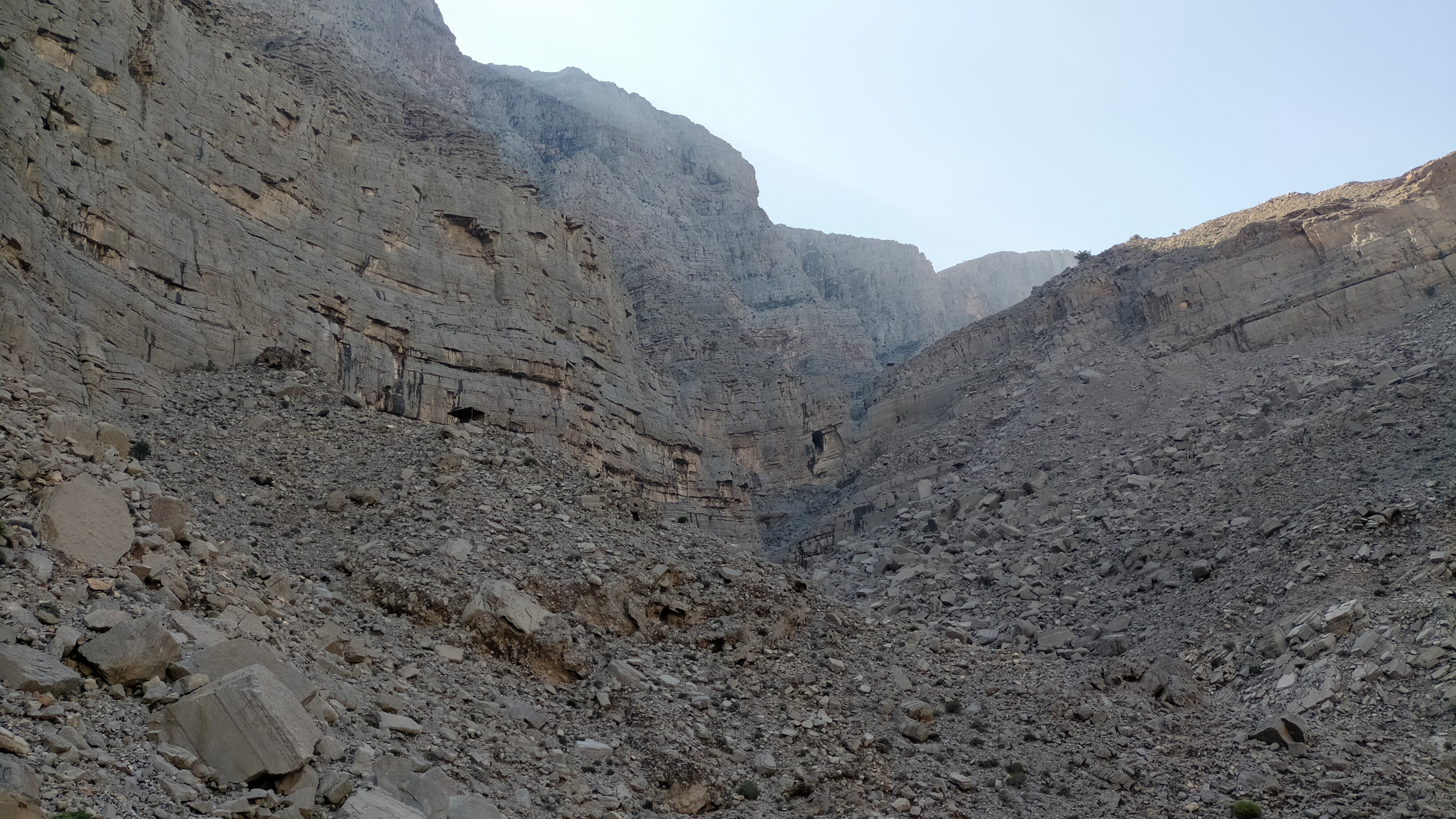
Deep ravine on the left branch of Wadi Litibah, a tributary of Wadi Ghalilah. Emirate of Ras Al Khaimah (UAE)

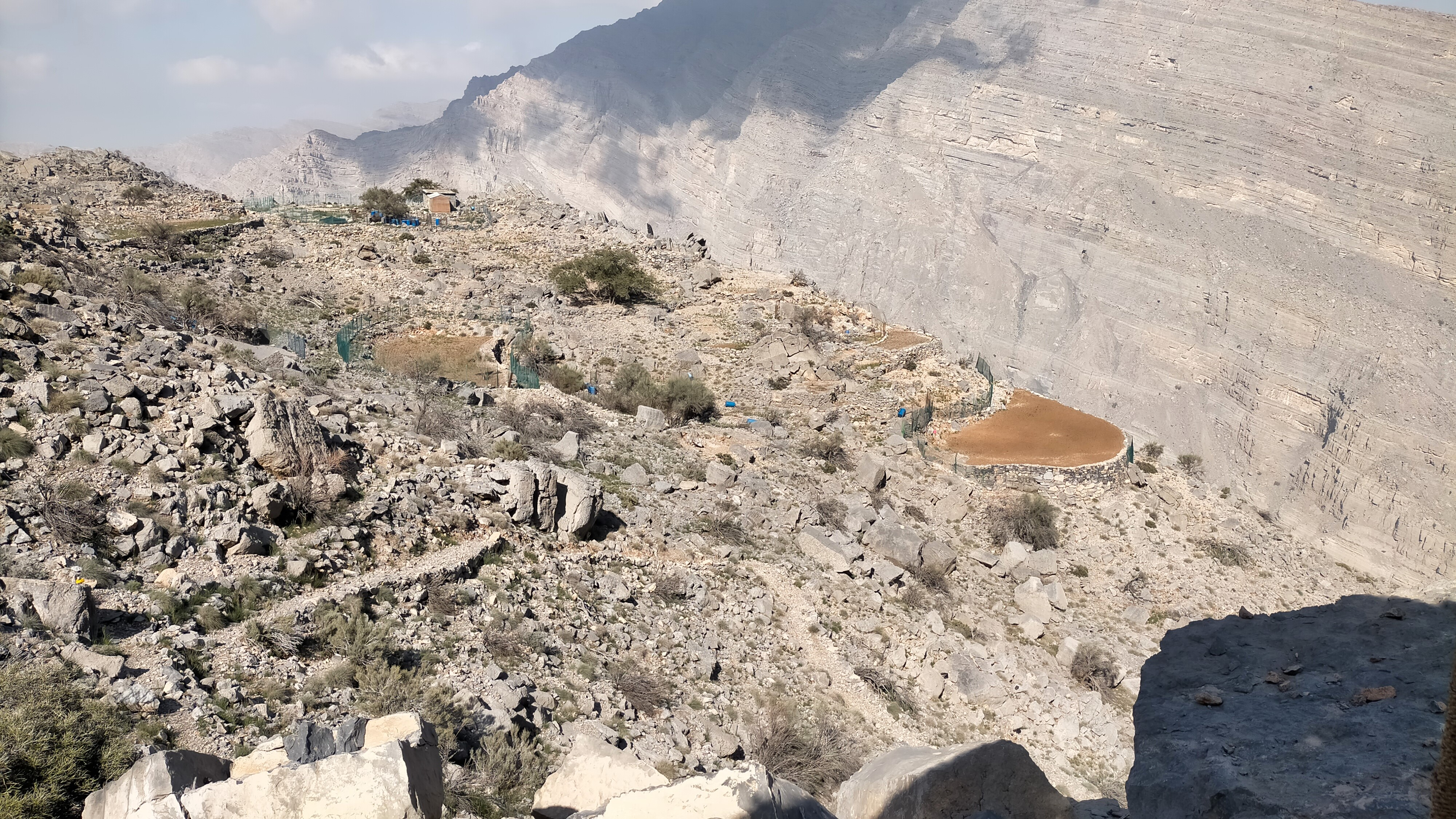
Some small farms and terraces in the upper areas of Wadi Litibah, a tributary of Wadi Ghalilah. Emirate of Ras Al Khaimah (UAE)

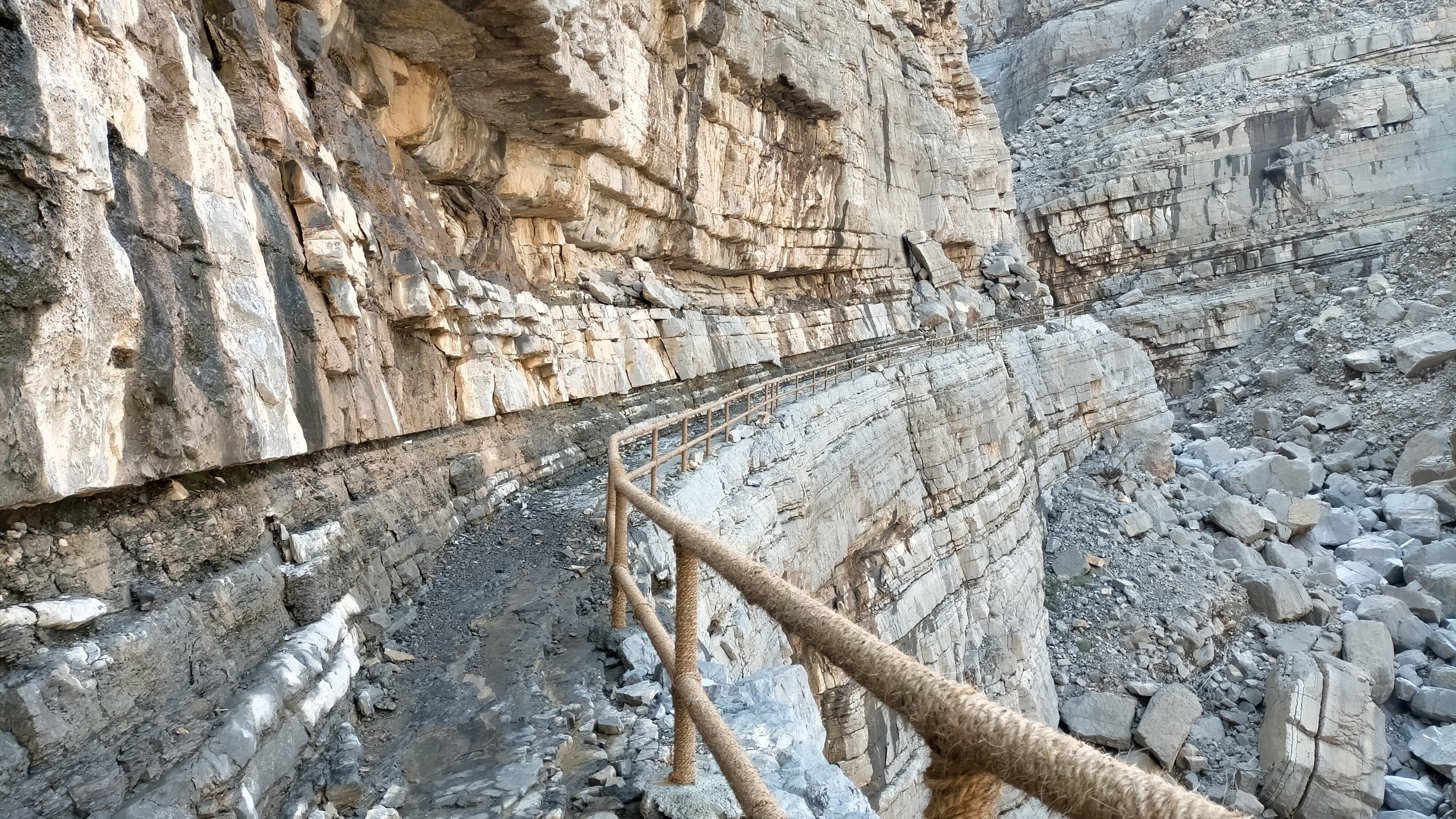
Very steep and rocky path, partly stepped with stone. Some sections are protected with safety railings. Wadi Litibah.

== See also ==
- List of wadis of the United Arab Emirates
- List of mountains in the United Arab Emirates
- List of wadis of Oman
- List of mountains in Oman
