= Wadi Barut =

Wadi in the UAE

Wadi Barut Wādī Barut
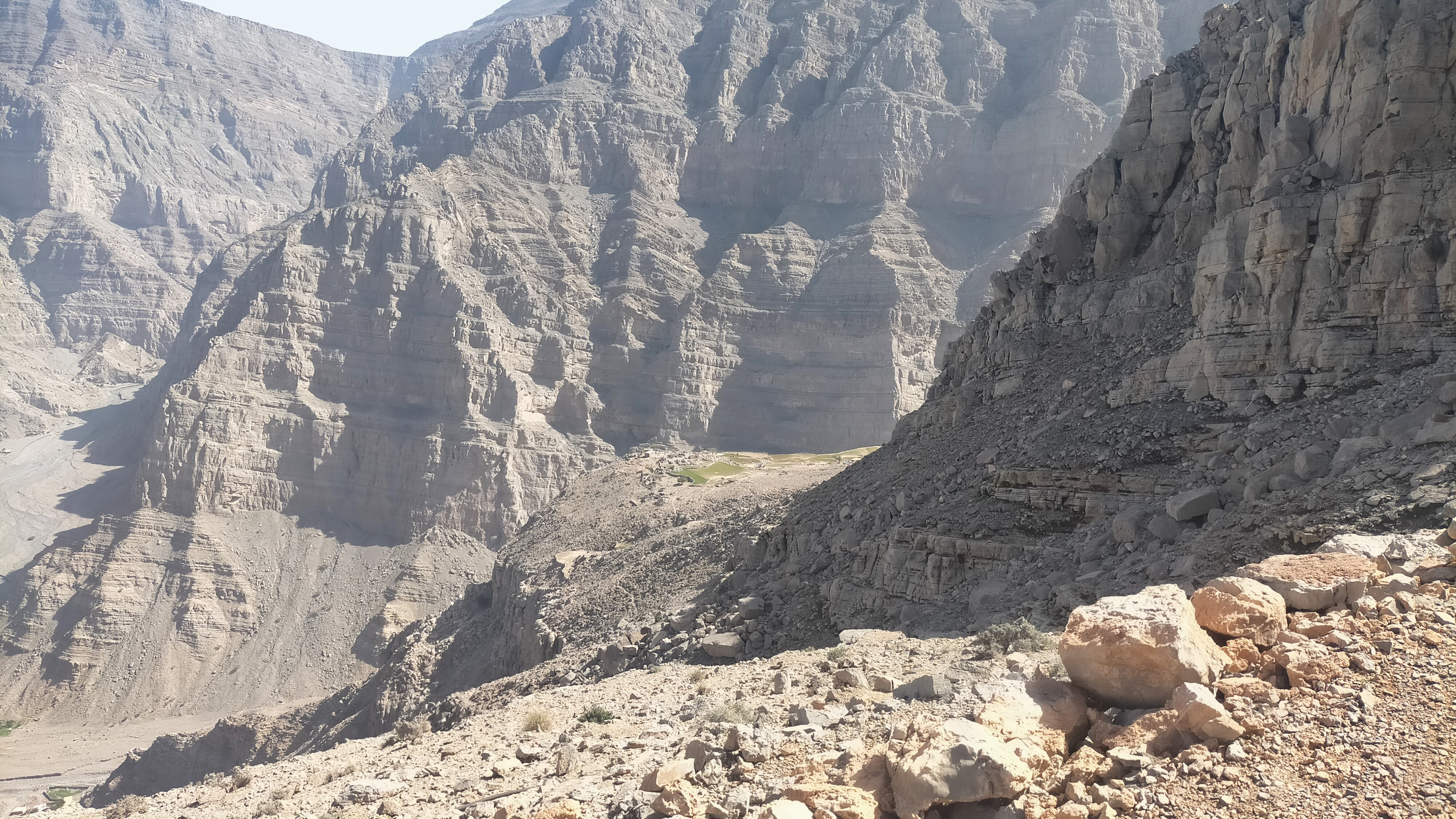
- Wadi Barut, a tributary of the Wadi Ghalilah, in the Emirate of Ras Al Khaimah

- Location within United Arab Emirates
- Native name: وادي باروت (Arabic)

Location
- Country: United Arab Emirates
- Emirate: Ras Al Khaimah

Physical characteristics
- Source: Northern slope of Jabal ar Rahrah (1,691 m) Hajar Mountains
  - elevation: 1,430 m (4,690 ft)
- Mouth: Confluence with the Wadi Litibah into the Wadi Ghalilah, at the Wadi Ghalilah Dam
  - coordinates: 25°58′35″N 56°09′02″E
  - elevation: 140 m (460 ft)
- Length: 4.5 km (2.8 mi)
- Basin size: 76.32 km^{2} (29.47 mi^{2})

Basin features
- River system: Wadi Ghalilah

Wadi Barut (Arabic: وادي باروت, romanized: Wādī Barut), is a valley or dry river, with ephemeral or intermittent flow, flowing almost exclusively during the rainy season, located in the northeast of the United Arab Emirates, in the Emirate of Ras Al Khaimah.

The Wadi Barut and the Wadi Litibah join to form the Wadi Ghalilah at their confluence. The Wadi Barut is formed mainly by the ravines and gullies that run along the northern slope of the Jabal ar Rahrah (1,691 m (5,548 ft)); along the western slope of Jabal Bil Ays / Jebel Jais (1,911 m (6,270 ft)); and along the eastern slope of a branch of the Jabal Ar Rahrah Ridge.

== Course ==
Along its route, from south to north, the different branches of the upper course of Wadi Barut cross a steep area, with very uneven terrain and little vegetation cover, which is almost impossible to access without climbing equipment and techniques, making it a little-known and rarely visited area, and an ideal natural space for the survival of some of the animal species threatened with extinction in this region of the Arabian Peninsula.

This feature of the area has aroused the interest of naturalists involved in conservation or management projects for natural areas and species, who have explored the place in search of traces that might allow them to detect the now improbable presence of arabian leopards (Panthera pardus nimr) and caracals (Caracal caracal), and to learn about the feeding habits of other wild mammals and their eventual prey: red foxes (Vulpes vulpes), Blanford's foxes (Vulpes cana), arabian tahr (Arabitragus jayakari), Arabian gazelle (Gazella gazella), etc.

In the western part and in its middle course (much more accessible), the Wadi Barut crosses cultivation areas in terraces and farms built on terraces arranged on its steep slopes, grouped in the small villages of Dafalas (Dirat Dafalas), Deira Al-Rakba, Barut, Qa`az, Abba, Salajat and others, communicated through a donkey trail that runs between the dam of the Wadi Ghalilah (Wadi Ghalilah Dam) and the Jabal Ar Rahrah Ridge.

Very close to the village of Deira Al-Rakba, the three main branches of Wadi Barut join together and form several spectacular dry waterfalls, known as Wadi Barut Dry Falls.

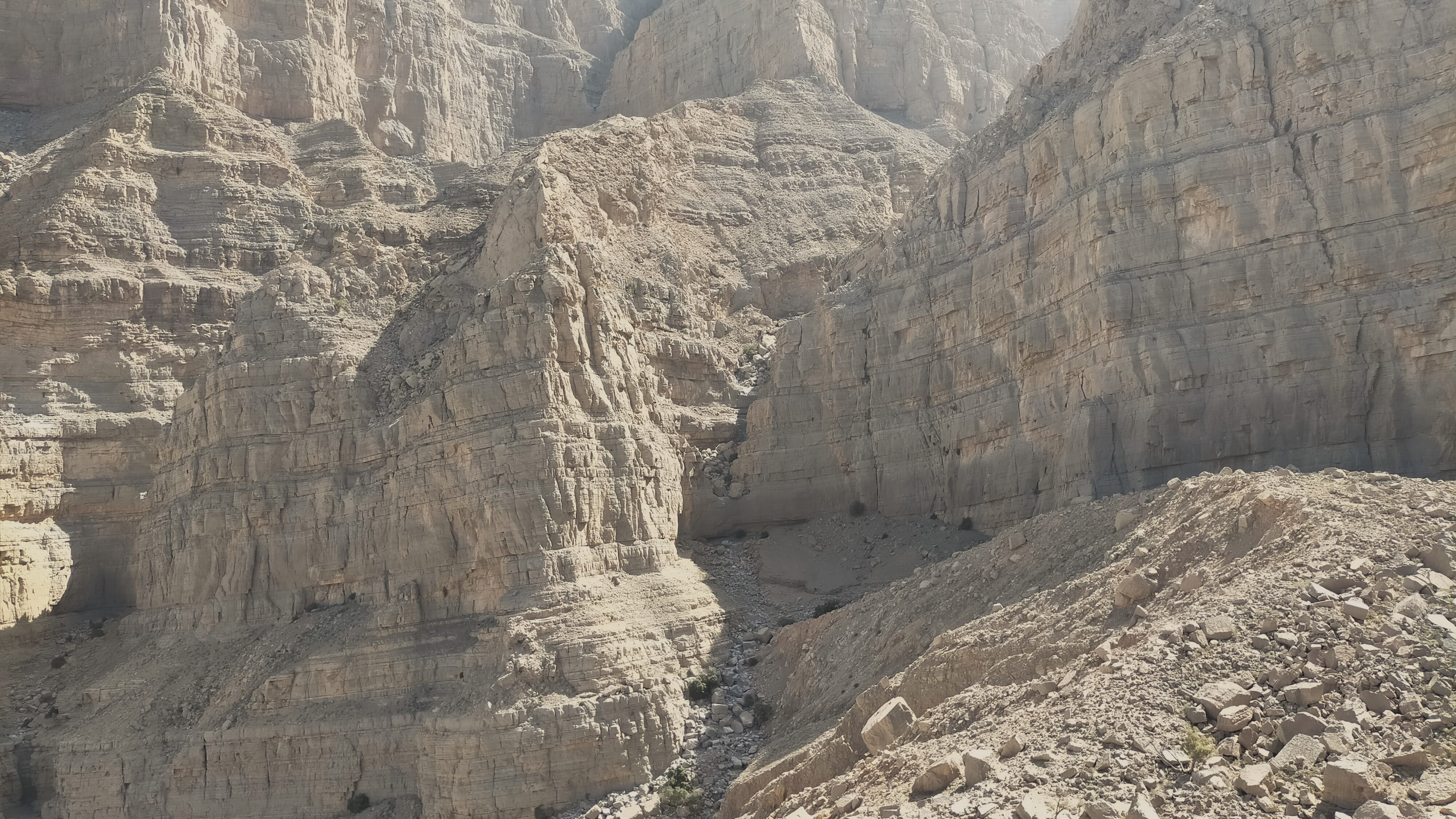
Wadi Barut Dry Falls

In the area of confluence with the Wadi Litibah, to form the Wadi Ghalilah, there are also small farms on both banks of the wadi, which can be accessed via a road of stone and gravel. Those on the right bank are located at the foot of a large rock wall, 600 m high, called Barut Wall, valued by climbers as the longest climbing route in the country.

== Toponymy ==
Alternative names are Wadi Barut, Wādī Barut, and Wadi Barun.

The name of Wadi Barut was recorded in the documentation and maps produced between 1950 and 1960 by the British Arabist, cartographer, military officer, and diplomat Julian F. Walker during the work carried out to establish borders between what was then called Trucial States, later completed by the Ministry of Defence (United Kingdom), on 1:100,000 scale maps published in 1971.

In the National Atlas of the United Arab Emirates it also appears spelled as Wādī Barut.

In the political and administrative organization of the Emirate of Ras Al Khaimah, the name of the main wadi is frequently used as an identifying element of the entire territory covered by its drainage basin.

In the case of Wadi Ghalilah, this drainage basin is very large 76.32 km^{2} (29.47 mi^{2}), comprising numerous towns, villages and farms widely scattered throughout its valleys and mountains. Naturally, it also includes all the ravines and tributaries of the main wadi.

The same denomination is also used for postal purposes.

For this reason, the mistake of considering that this is the only name that corresponds to all the different wadis, and even to some population centers in this region, is widespread, frequently ignoring the true name of each of these places.

This has contributed to the fact that Wadi Barut has also been incorrectly referred to as Wadi Ghalilah on a few occasions.

== Population ==
The geographical area of Wadi Barut was historically inhabited by the semi-nomadic tribe Shihuh, section of Bani Shatair (Arabic: بني شطير), which occupied, among other territories, the tribal areas of Bani Bakhit and Banī Sā`ad.

== Gallery ==
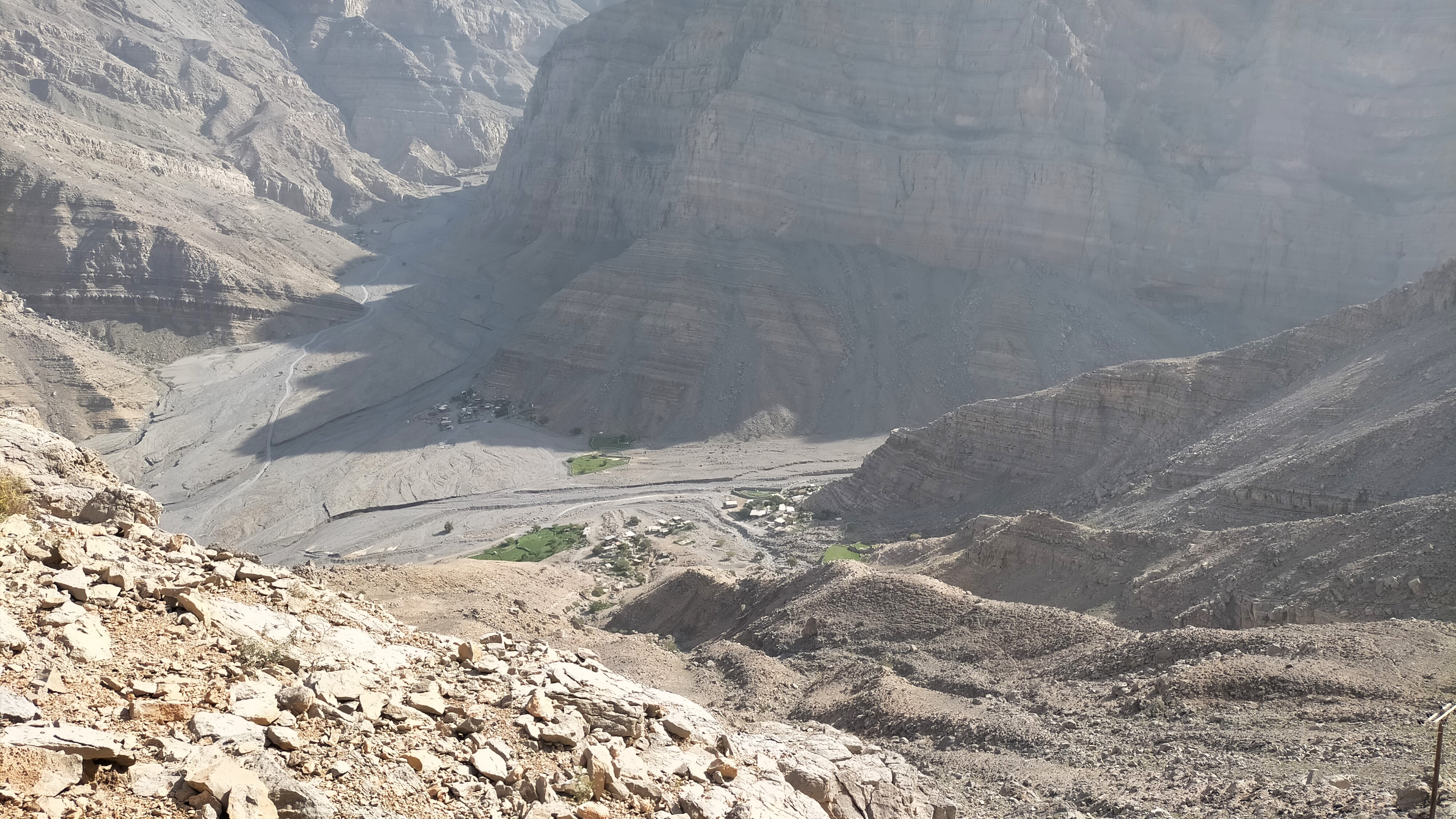
Confluence area of Wadi Litibah and Wadi Barut (UAE), next to the Wadi Ghalilah Dam

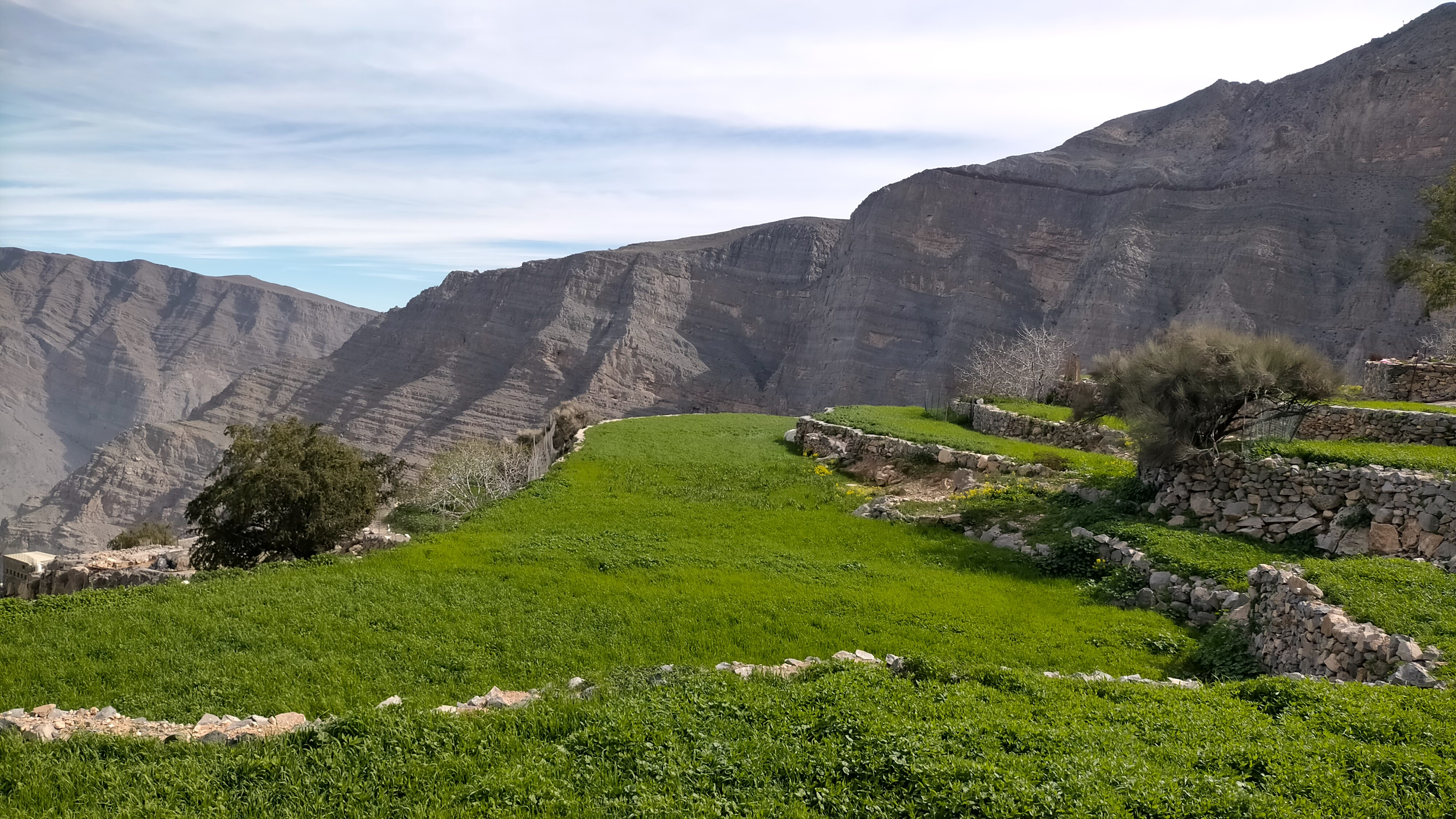
Cultivated terraces in the upper area of Wadi Barut - Dirat Dafalas

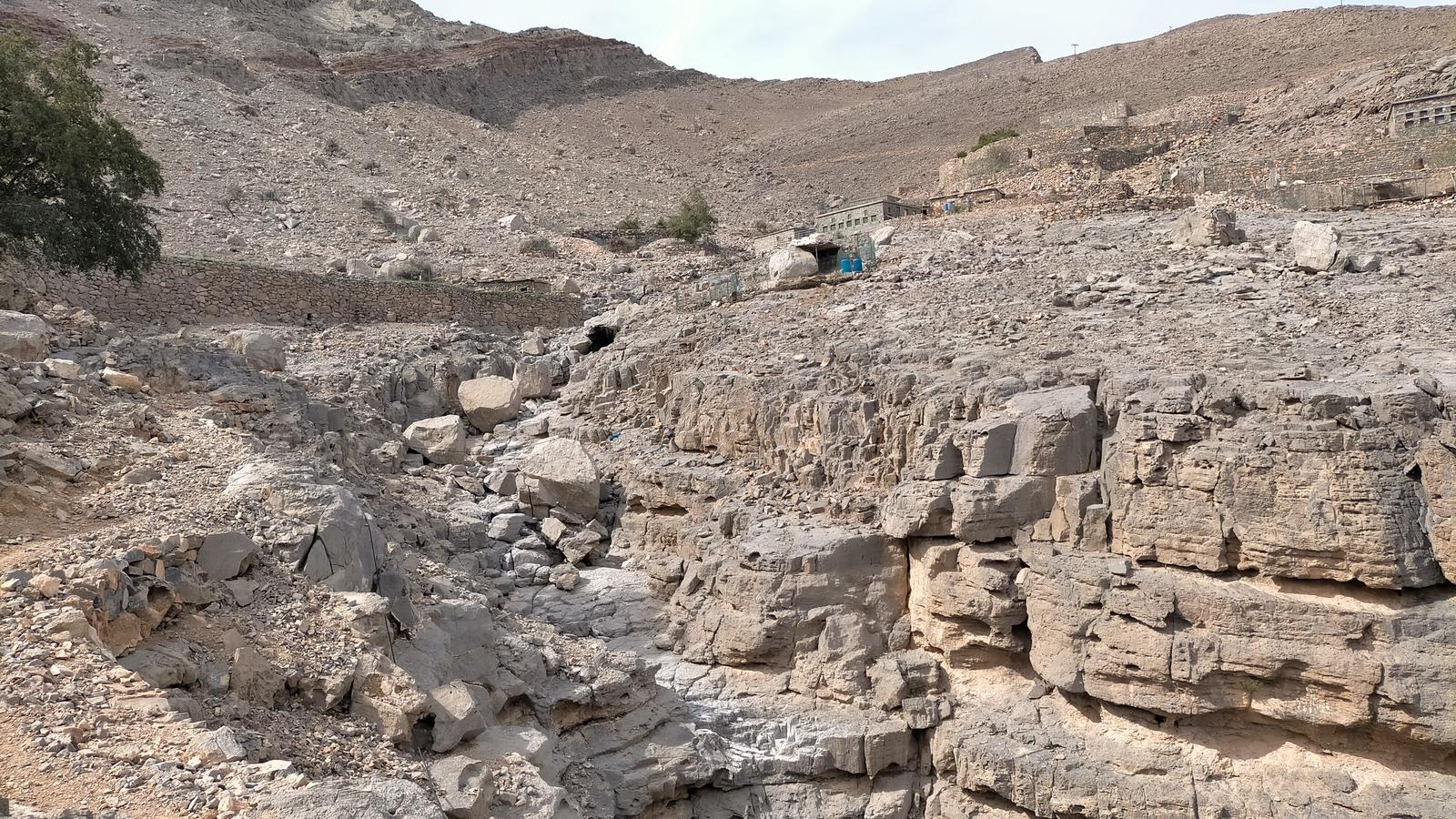
Tributary of Wadi Ghalilah in the upper area of Wadi Barut - Dirat Dafalas

== See also ==
- List of wadis of the United Arab Emirates
- List of mountains in the United Arab Emirates
- List of wadis of Oman
- List of mountains in Oman
