= Wadi Halhal =

Wadi in the UAE

Wadi Halhal Wādī Ḩālḥāl
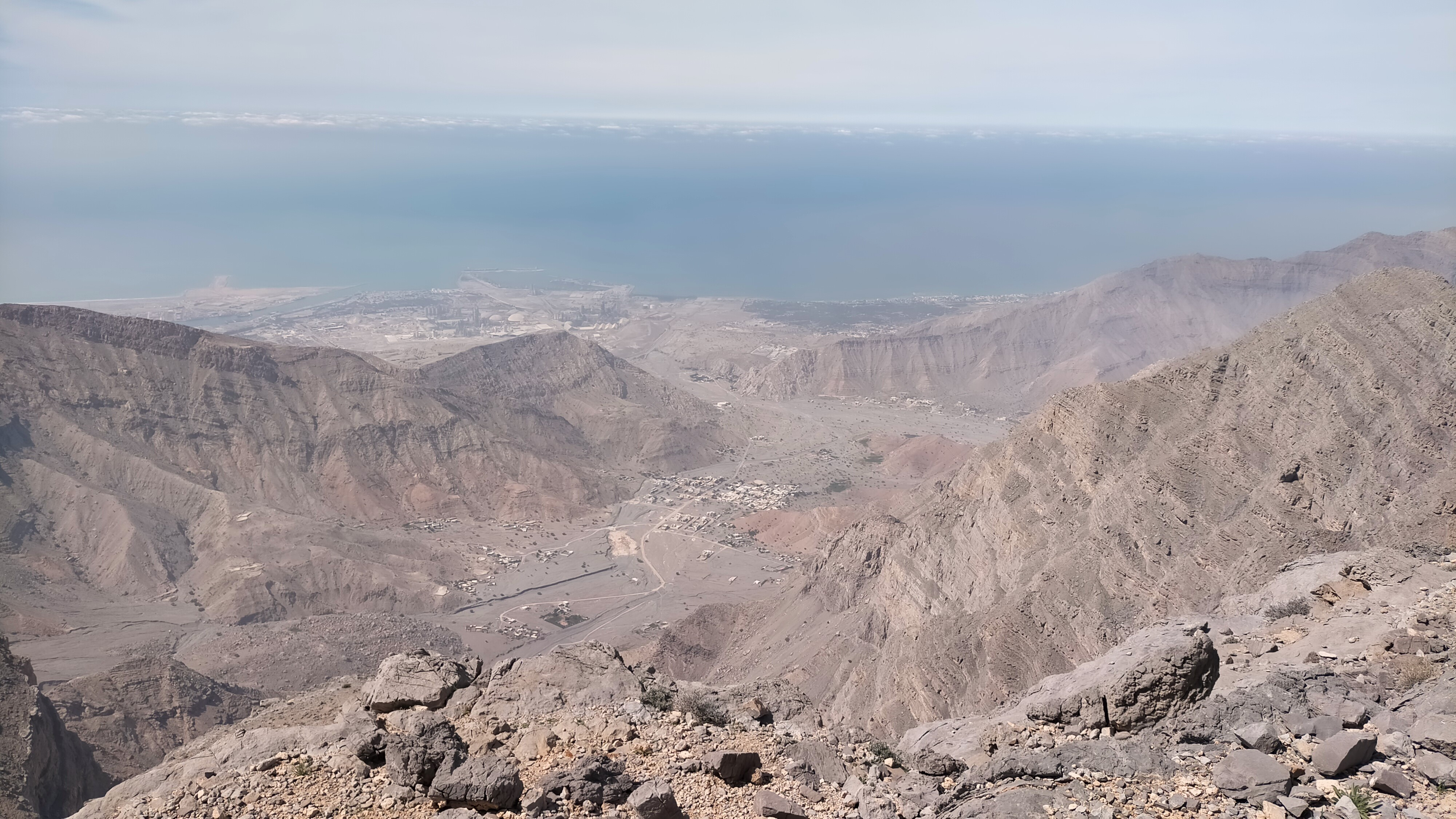
- Wadi Halhal, a tributary of the Wadi Ghalilah. View from the Jabal Ar Rahrah Ridge

- Location within United Arab Emirates
- Native name: وادي هالحال (Arabic)

Location
- Country: United Arab Emirates
- Emirate: Ras Al Khaimah

Physical characteristics
- Source: Northwest slope of Jabal Shintal (1,435 m) Hajar Mountains
  - elevation: 1,300 m (4,300 ft)
- Mouth: Confluence with Wadi Ghalilah
  - coordinates: 25°57′39″N 56°06′04″E
  - elevation: 140 m (460 ft)
- Length: 4.5 km (2.8 mi)
- Basin size: 76.32 km^{2} (29.47 mi^{2})

Basin features
- River system: Wadi Ghalilah

Wadi Halhal (Arabic: وادي هالحال, romanized: Wādī Hālḥāl) is a valley or dry river, with intermittent flow, which flows almost exclusively during the rainy season, located in the northeast of the United Arab Emirates, in the Emirate of Ras Al Khaimah.

It is a tributary of the Wadi Ghalilah, on the left bank, and its alluvial fan is formed by the ravines and gullies that run along the northwestern slope of the Jabal Shintal (1,435 m) and by the northern slope of Jabal Rahabah (1,543 m)

== Course ==
In its course, from the south and southeast, to the northwest, divided into two branches, the Wadi Halhal crosses in its upper zone, cultivated areas, some small farms with goats, and scattered houses, and in its middle course it crosses the town of Halhal, which It has had rapid growth in recent years, linked to the economic activity of Ghalilah, its port area, the cement industry, and its important water desalination plant.

== Toponymy ==
Alternative Names: Wadi Halhal, Wādī Ḩalḩal, Wādī Ḩālḥāl.

The name of this wadi was recorded in the documentation and maps produced between 1950 and 1960 by the British Arabist, cartographer, army officer and diplomat Julian F. Walker, during the work carried out to establish borders between the then called Trucial States, later completed by the Ministry of Defence - United Kingdom, on 1:100,000 scale maps published in 1971.

There are interesting bibliographical references to Wadi Halhal, in the works published by the British anthropologist William Lancaster, and is also listed, as Wādī Ḩalḩal', in the United Arab Emirates National Atlas

In the political and administrative organization of the Emirate of Ras Al Khaimah, the name of the main wadi is frequently used as an identifying element of the entire territory covered by its drainage basin.

In the case of Wadi Ghalilah, this drainage basin is very large (76.32 km^{2}), comprising numerous towns, villages and farms widely scattered throughout its valleys and mountains. Naturally, it also includes all the ravines and tributaries of the main wadi.

The same denomination is also used for postal purposes.

For this reason, the mistake of considering that this is the only name that corresponds to all the different wadis, and even to some population centers in this region, is widespread, frequently ignoring the true name of each of these places.

This has contributed to the fact that Wadi Halhal has also been incorrectly referred to as Wadi Ghalilah on a few occasions.

== Population ==
The geographical area of Wadi Halhal was populated historically by the semi nomadic tribe Shihuh, section of Bani Shatair (Arabic: بني شطير), which occupied, among other territories, the tribal areas of Bani Bakhit, Banī Sā‘ad and Maḩābīb.

== See also ==
- List of wadis of the United Arab Emirates
- List of mountains in the United Arab Emirates
- List of wadis of Oman
- List of mountains in Oman
