= Wadi Khabb =

Wadi in the UAE

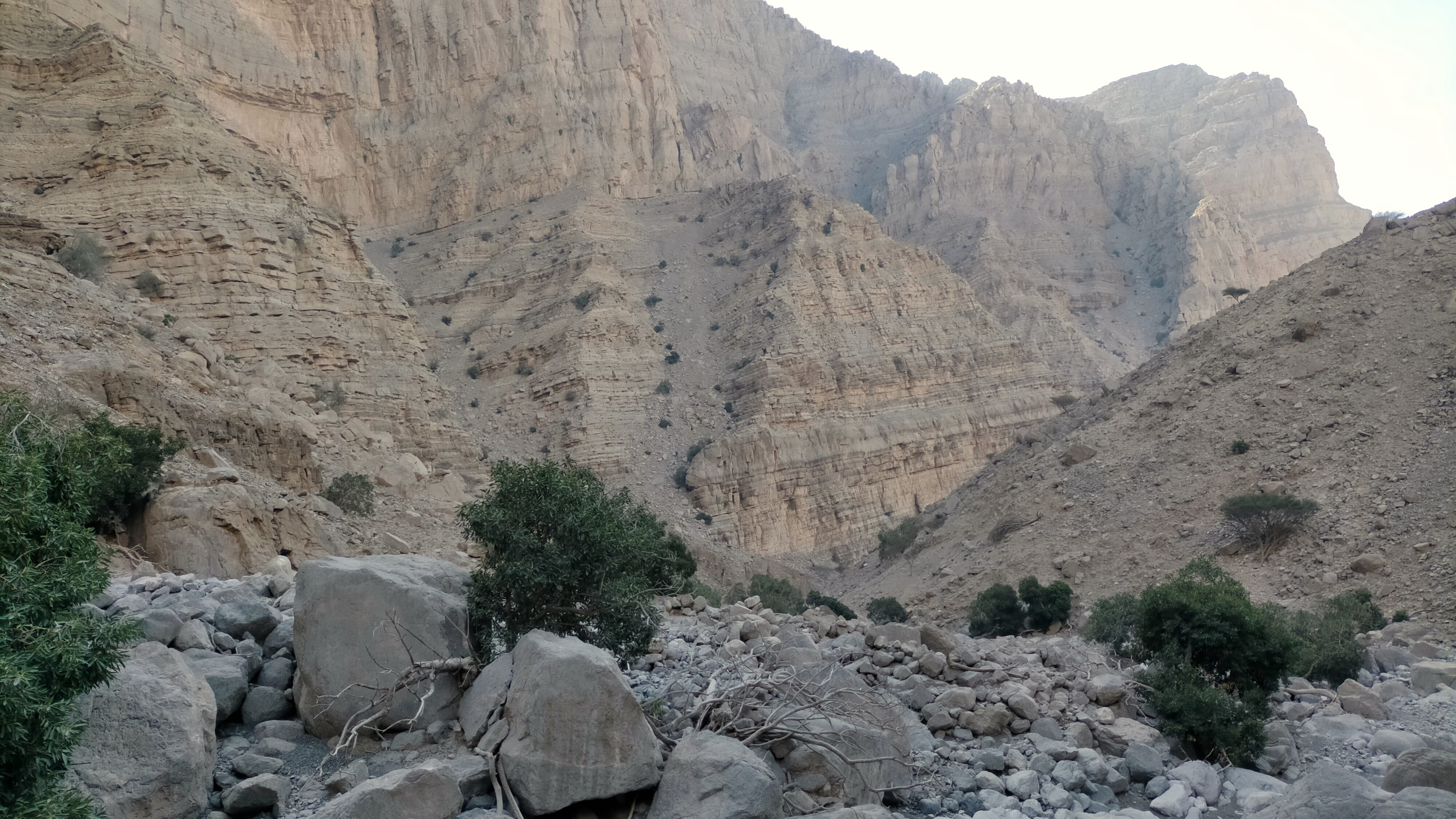
- Wadi Khabb - Tributary of Wadi Ghalilah. Emirate of Ras Al Khaimah (UAE)

- Location within United Arab Emirates

Location
- Country: United Arab Emirates
- Emirate: Ras Al Khaimah

Physical characteristics
- Source: Southwestern slope of Jabal Hadaba (1,712 m) Hajar Mountains
  - elevation: 1,140 m (3,740 ft)
- Mouth: Confluence with the Wadi Ghalilah, after the Wadi Ghalilah Dam
  - coordinates: 25°59′11.2″N 56°08′20.4″E
  - elevation: 140 m (460 ft)
- Length: 3.5 km (2.2 mi)
- Basin size: 76.32 km^{2} (29.47 mi^{2})

Basin features
- River system: Wadi Ghalilah

Wadi Khabb is a valley or dry river, with intermittent flow, which flows almost exclusively during the rainy season, located in the northeast of the United Arab Emirates, in the Emirate of Ras Al Khaimah.

It is a tributary on the right bank of the Wadi Ghalilah, and is formed mainly by the ravines and gullies that run along the southwestern slope of the mountain hill (1,712 m), located on the border between the UAE and Oman; and by the southern slope of Jabal Khabb (1,145 m).

== Course ==
In its short course, from northeast to southeast, the Wadi Khabb passes through the ancient settlement of Khabb, located in the center of the small alluvial fan of the valley, which has grown a lot and has spread to the south in recent years, towards the mouth of the wadi, currently forming an important population center, which benefits from the proximity and good access to the city of Ghalilah and the coast of the Persian Gulf.

== Toponymy ==
Alternative Names: Wadi Khabb, Wādī Khabb, Wādī Khab, Wadi Kubb, Wadi Al Kabs, Wadi Al Khab.

The name of this wadi was recorded in the documentation and maps produced between 1950 and 1960 by the British Arabist, cartographer, military officer and diplomat Julian F. Walker, during the work carried out to establish borders between the then called Trucial States, later completed by the UK Ministry of Defence, on 1:100,000 scale maps published in 1971.

There are interesting bibliographical references to the Wadi Khabb (translated from Arabic into English as Wadi Kubb), in the works published by the British anthropologist William Lancaster.

It also appears, with the spelling Wādī Khab, in the National Atlas of the United Arab Emirates.

In the political and administrative organization of the Emirate of Ras Al Khaimah, the name of the main wadi is frequently used as an identifying element of the entire territory covered by its drainage basin.

In the case of Wadi Ghalilah, this drainage basin is very large (76.32 km^{2}), comprising numerous towns, villages and farms widely scattered throughout its valleys and mountains. Naturally, it also includes all the ravines and tributaries of the main wadi.

The same denomination is also used for postal purposes.

For this reason, the mistake of considering that this is the only name that corresponds to all the different wadis, and even to some population centers in this region, is widespread, frequently ignoring the true name of each of these places.

This has contributed to Wadi Khabb being incorrectly referred to as Wadi Ghalilah on a few occasions.

== Population ==
The geographical area of Wadi Khabb was historically populated by the semi-nomadic tribe Shihuh, section of Bani Shatair (Arabic: بني شطير), which occupied, among other territories, the tribal area of Hammad.

== See also ==
- List of wadis of the United Arab Emirates
- List of mountains in the United Arab Emirates
- List of wadis of Oman
- List of mountains in Oman
