= Jabal Rahabah =

Mountain in the UAE

- Jabal Raḩabah
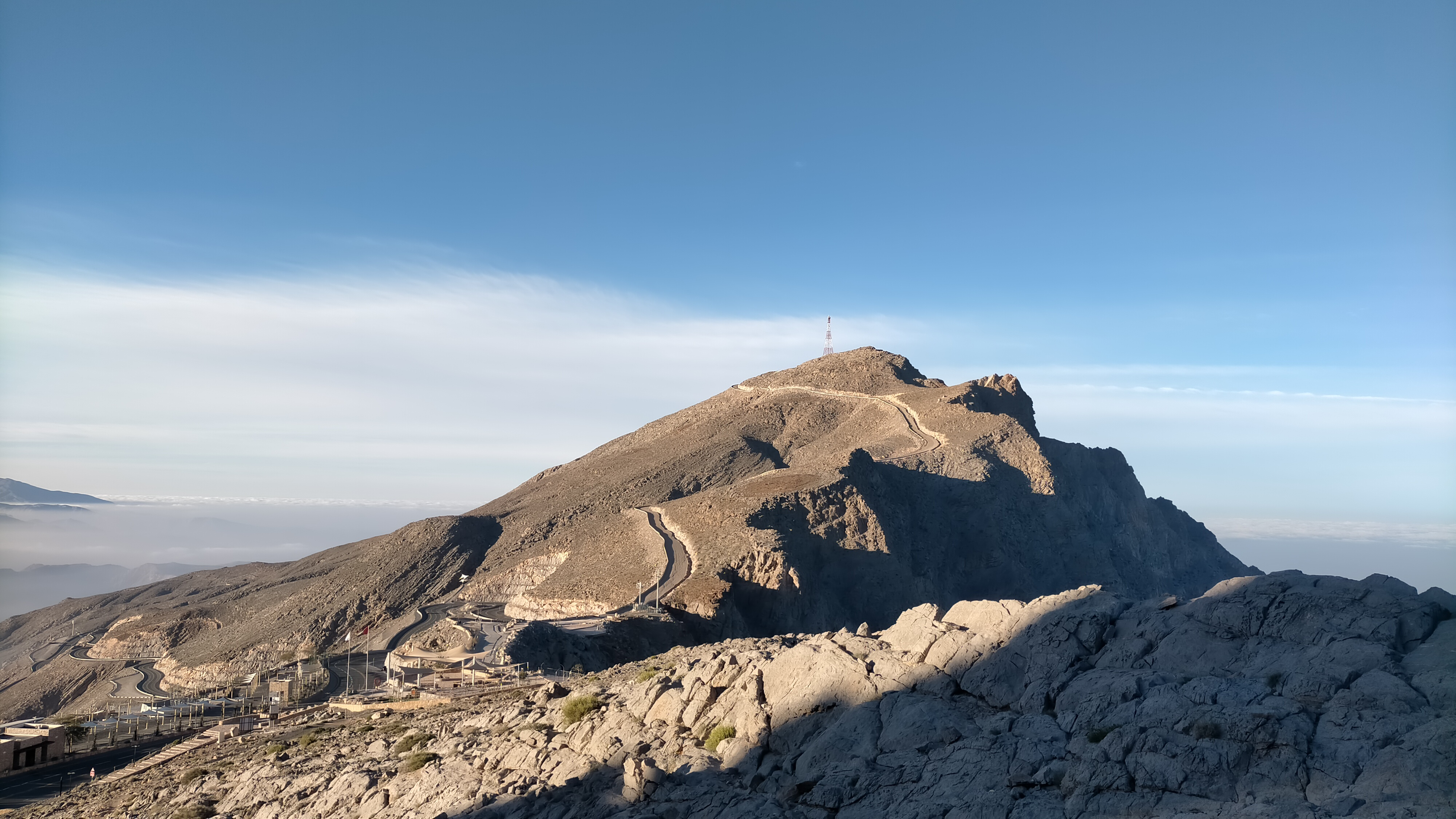
- View of Jabal Raḩabah from its North Col

Highest point
- Elevation: 1,543 m (5,062 ft)
- Prominence: 320 m (1,050 ft)
- Isolation: 4,032 km (2,505 mi)
- Coordinates: 25°55′34.0″N 56°07′00.8″E

Naming
- Native name: جبل رحبة (Arabic)

Geography
- Location within United Arab Emirates Location within Persian Gulf Location within West and Central Asia
- Country: United Arab Emirates
- Emirate: Ras al-Khaimah
- Parent range: Al-Hajar Mountains

Jabal Rahabah (Arabic: جبل رحبة, romanized: Jabal Raḩabah), is a peak in the Hajar Mountains, northeast of the United Arab Emirates, in the Emirate of Ras Al Khaimah. At 1,543 m (5,062 ft), it is one of the highest peaks in the UAE, located entirely within the territory of the Emirates

Between Jabal Rahabah (1,543 m (5,062 ft)) and Jabal ar Rahrah (1,691 m (5,548 ft)), the highest peak in the country, there is an important ridge of 5 km (3.1 mi) in length, called Jabal ar Raḩraḩ Ridge, which delimits the drainage divide between those that flow towards the Wadi Ghalilah and the Wādī Shāh or Wadi Shehah, through their respective tributaries.

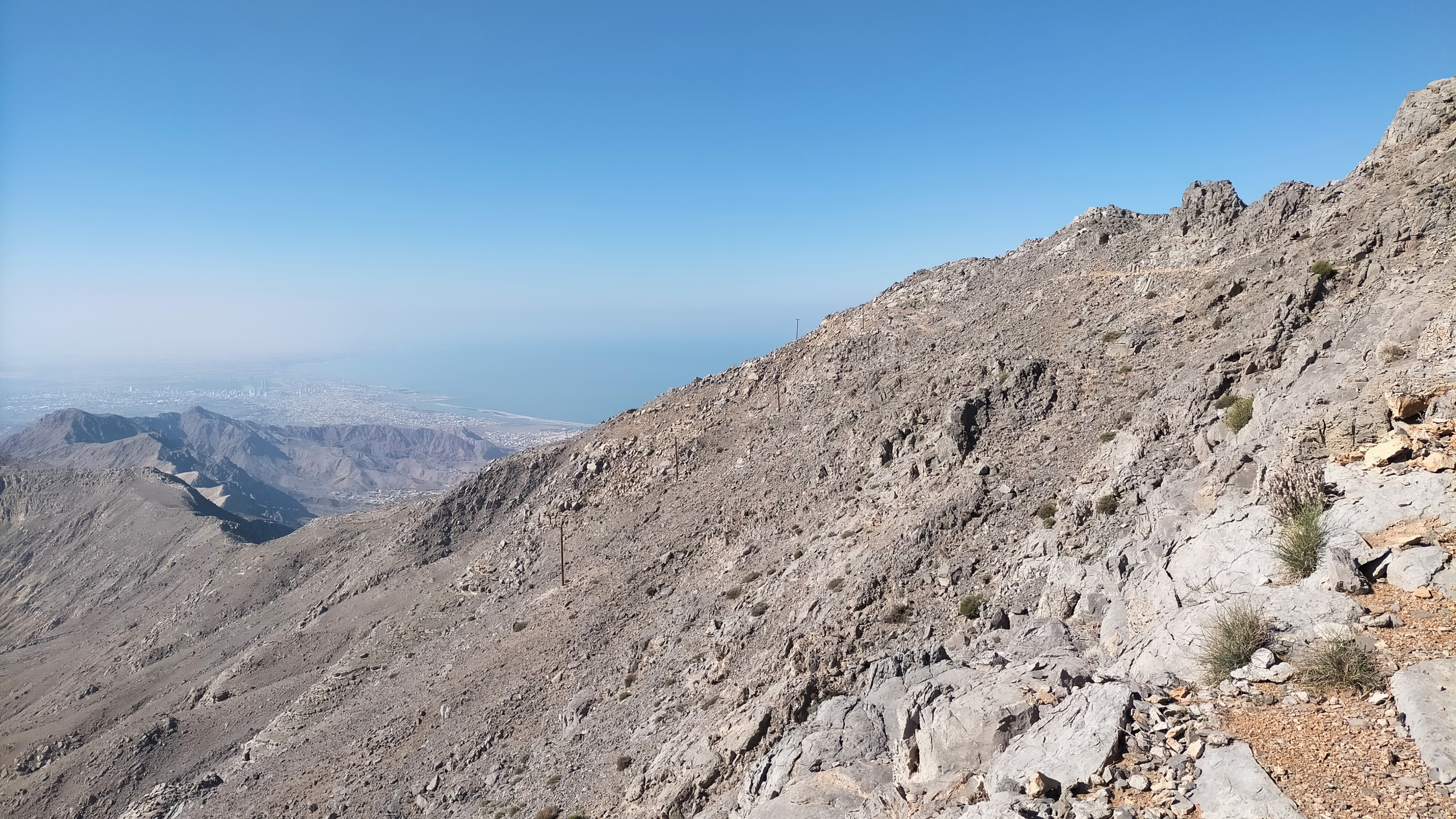
View of the ridge or mountain range extending southwards, from Jabal Rahabah

On the eastern slope of Jabal Rahabah, currently badly damaged by the construction of a wide road, flow intermittent streams and small ravines and wadis tributaries of Wadi Jib, which in turn is a tributary of Wādī Shāh or Wadi Shehah; and on the western slope it forms the Wadi Rahabah / Raḩbah, which flows directly into the Persian Gulf.

At the top of Jabal Rahabah there is currently a communications antenna, but it is perfectly accessible by following a pedestrian path towards the southwest that starts from Rahabah North Col 1,223 m (4,012 ft), where there are currently installed viewpoints and a service area, commercially identified with the name Viewing Deck Park.

== Population ==
The geographical area of Jabal Rahabah was historically populated by the tribe Bani Shatair (Arabic: بني شطير), one of the two main sections of the Shihuh seminomadic tribe, which occupied, among other territories, the Shihuh tribal area Bani Bakhit.

== Geographical features ==
Jabal Rahabah is the fifth highest peak in United Arab Emirates, located 7.2 km (4.5 mi) to the west of Jebel Jais / Jabal Bil 'Ays (1,911 m (6,270 ft)), whose summit is, however, in the Musandam Governorate, in the Sultanate of Oman

Jabal Rahabah's altitude may seem modest when compared to mountainous locations in other parts of the world, but considering that much of the country has predominantly flat relief, Jabal Rahabah represents a notable exception.

In this sense, the highest mountains in the Emirates, located entirely within its territory, or with its peak located exactly on the border with Oman, are the following:

  - Jabal as Sayh (1,746 m) Emirate of Ras Al Khaimah (On the border between UAE and Oman) - Coordinates 25.971889°N, 56.191667°E
  - Jabal Ar Rahrah (1,691 m) Emirate of Ras Al Khaimah - Coordinates 25.94419°N, 56.15219°E
  - Jabal Sal (1,575 m) Emirate of Ras Al Khaimah (On the border between UAE and Oman) - Coordinates 25.93251°N, 56.16921°E
  - Jabal Harf Tila (1,568 m) Emirate of Ras Al Khaimah (On the border between UAE and Oman) - Coordinates 25°41'21.4"N 56°09'30.6"E
  - Jabal Rahabah (1,543 m) Emirate of Ras Al Khaimah - Coordinates 25.92610°N, 56.11689°E
  - Jabal Yibir / Jabal Al-Mebrah (1,527 m) Emirate of Fujairah - Coordinates 25.64860°N, 56.12860°E
  - Jabal Yabānah (1,480 m) Emirate of Ras Al Khaimah (On the border between UAE and Oman) - Coordinates 25.87500°N, 56.16000°E
  - Jabal Shintal (1,435 m) Emirate of Ras Al Khaimah - Coordinates 25.94184°N, 56.13511°E
  - Jabal Al Ahqab / Jabal Qada‘ah (1,375 m) Emirate of Ras Al Khaimah - Coordinates 25.77781°N, 56.14190°E

== Toponymy ==
Alternative Names: Jabal Rahabah, Jabal Raḩabah, Jabal ar Ra`aylah, Jabal ar Ra‘aylah, Jabal Raḩbah, Jabal Rahaba.

The name of Jabal Rahabah (with the spelling Jabal Raḩabah) was recorded in the documentation and maps produced between 1950 and 1960 by the British Arabist, cartographer, military officer, and diplomat Julian F. Walker, during the work carried out to establish borders between what was then called Trucial States, later completed by the Ministry of Defence (United Kingdom), on 1:100,000 scale maps published in 1971.

== See also ==
- List of mountains in the United Arab Emirates
- List of wadis of the United Arab Emirates
- List of mountains in Oman
- List of wadis in Oman

== Gallery ==
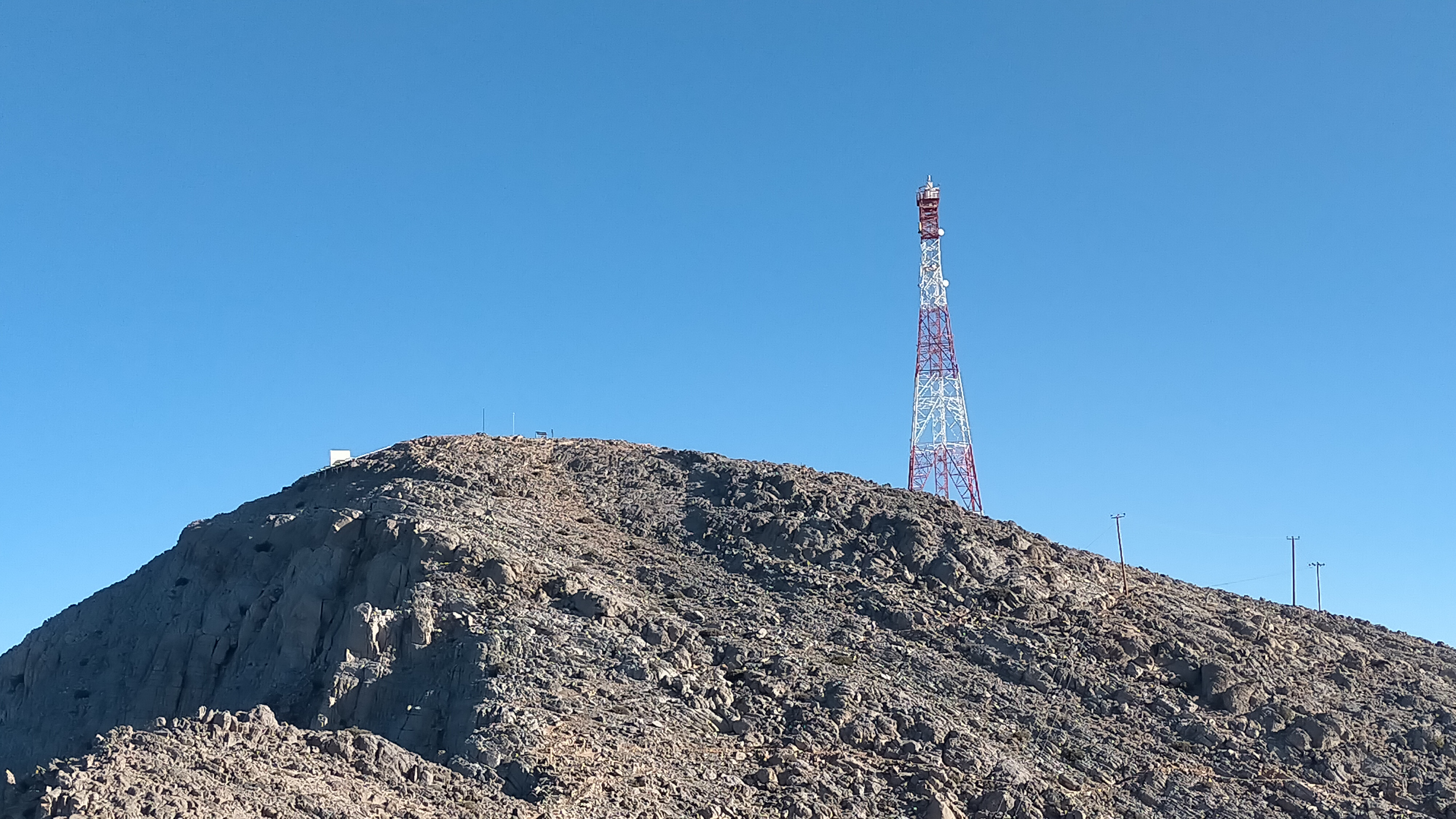
Summit

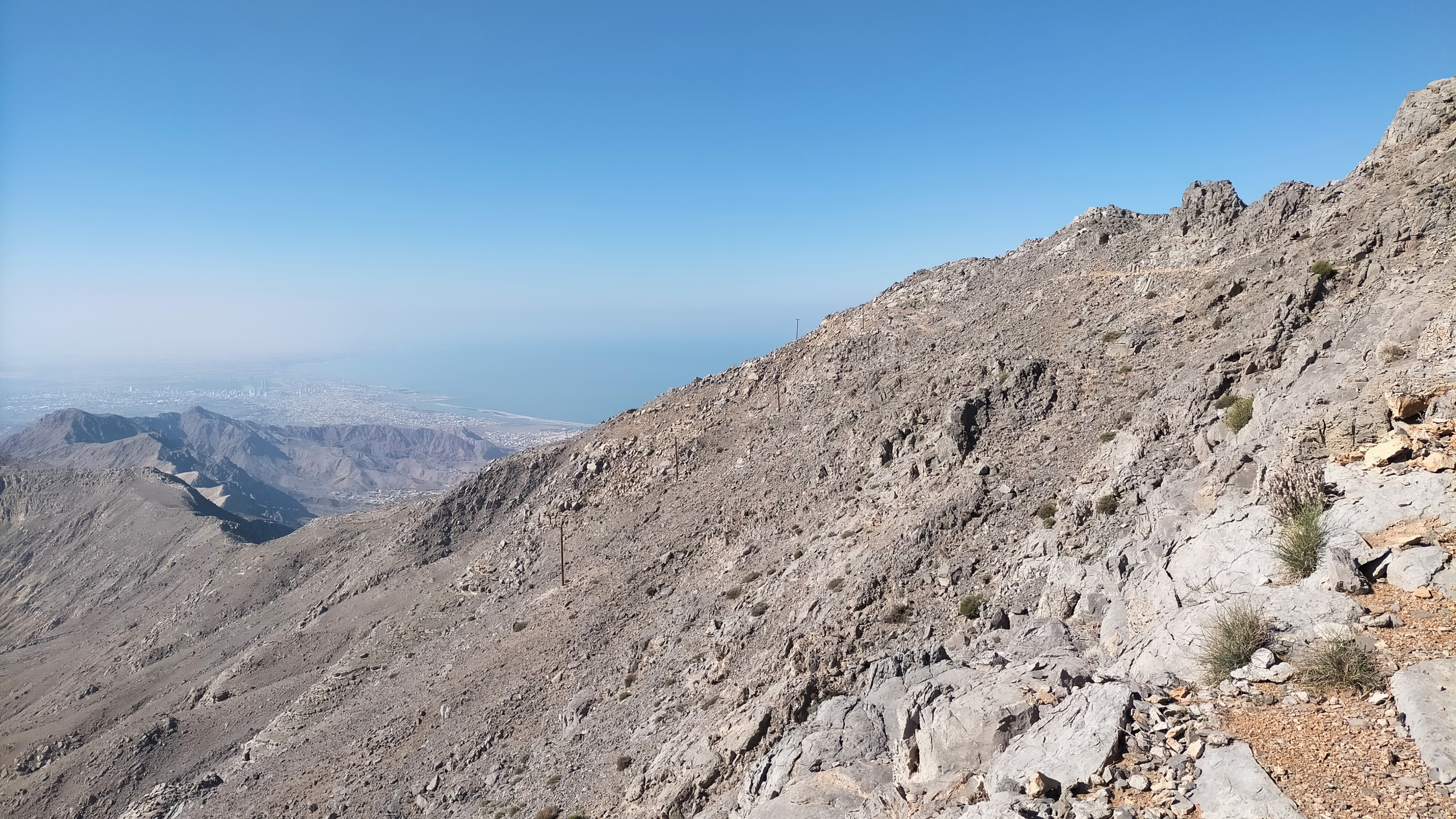
To the south of Jabal Raḩabah (1,543 m) a ridge extends, extending for approximately 6 km, paralleling the Persian Gulf coastline

== Maps and bibliography ==
- Julian Fortay Walker (1958) - Sketch map drawn by Julian Walker for boundary delimitation: Ras Al Khaimah - The National Archives, London, England
- Map of Trucial States, Muscat and Oman - Rams - Scale 1:100 000 - Published by D Survey, Ministry of Defence, United Kingdom (1971) - Edition 3-GSGS - The National Archives, London, England
- Heard-Bey, Frauke (2005). From Trucial States to United Arab Emirates : a society in transition. London: Motivate. ISBN 1860631673. OCLC 64689681.
- Lorimer, John (1915). Gazetteer of the Persian Gulf. British Government, Bombay. p. 735.
- Said., Zahlan, Rosemarie (2016). The Origins of the United Arab Emirates : a Political and Social History of the Trucial States. Taylor and Francis. p. 51. ISBN 9781317244653. OCLC 945874284.
