= Wadi Ghalilah =

Wadi in the UAE

Wadi Ghalilah Wādī Ghalīlah
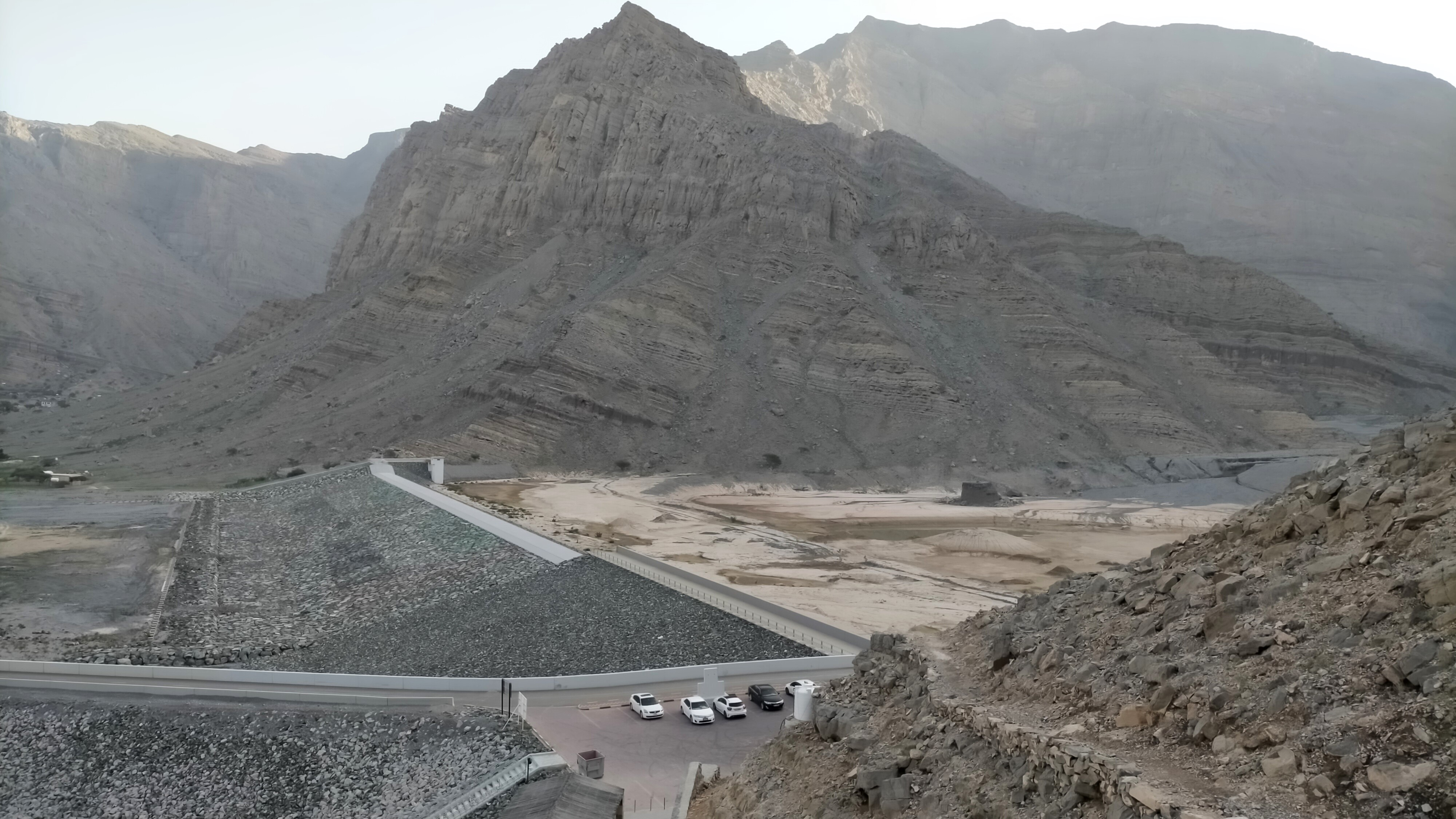
- Wadi Ghalilah Dam

- Location within United Arab Emirates Location within Persian Gulf Location within West and Central Asia
- Native name: وادي غليلة (Arabic)

Location
- Country: United Arab Emirates
- Emirate: Ras Al Khaimah

Physical characteristics
- Source: Wadi Ghalilah Dam. Confluence of the Wadi Litibah and the Wadi Barut. Al Hajar Mountains
  - elevation: 140 m (460 ft)
- Mouth: South of the city of Ghalilah, on the Persian Gulf
  - coordinates: 25°59′12.3″N 56°04′01.8″E
  - elevation: 0 m (0 ft)
- Length: 10 km (6.2 mi)
- Basin size: 76.32 km^{2} (29.47 mi^{2})

Basin features
- Progression: Wadi. Intermittent flow
- River system: Wadi Ghalilah
- Population: 1,622
- Tributaries
  - left: Wadi Litibah, Wadi Barut, Wadi Al Yaham, Wadi Halhal
  - right: Wadi Khabb

Wadi Ghalilah (Arabic: وادي غليلة, romanized: Wādī Ghalīlah) is a valley or dry river, with intermittent flow, which flows almost exclusively during the rainy season, located in the northeast of the United Arab Emirates, in the Emirate of Ras al Khaimah.

It is formed from the confluence of its two main tributaries: the Wadi Litibah and the Wadi Barut. At the point of confluence, a 420-meter-wide and 6-meter-high dam was built in 2001, called the Wadi Ghalilah Dam, intended mainly to feed underground water resources and reduce damage from eventual floods.

== Course ==
Starting from the dam, the Wadi Ghalilah follows its course from east to west, with a gentle and almost flat slope, a decline of 140 m in a distance of 10 km is distributed until its mouth in the Persian Gulf.

Throughout the wide valley that it forms, there are farms, small villages, scattered houses, and in recent years several urbanizations with chalets and luxurious residences have sprung up. According to the data collected in the Wadi Ghalilah Dam construction project, there are currently 1,100 houses and 188 farms in the area of this wadi.

The final stretch of the wadi runs through the controversial industrial zone of Khor Khwair, which is home to several of the largest quarries in the UAE, four cement factories, a gas processing plant, manufacturing facilities of marble and concrete, and other similar industries, with great environmental impact.

== Toponymy ==
Alternative Names: Wadi Ghalila, Wadi Ghalilah, Wādī Ghalīlah.

The names of this wadi and its tributaries was recorded in the documentation and maps produced between 1950 and 1960 by the British Arabist, cartographer, military officer and diplomat Julian F. Walker, during the work carried out to establish borders between what were then called Trucial States, later completed by the Ministry of Defense (UK), on 1:100,000 scale maps published in 1971.

Previously, there are multiple references to Ghalilah in the encyclopedic work published by the diplomat and historian John Gordon Lorimer (1870-1914), in the chapters devoted to the detail and description of the different tribes that inhabited the coast and the interior of the territory of the Musandam Peninsula.

It also appears, with the spelling Wādī Ghalīlah, in the National Atlas of the United Arab Emirates.

In the political and administrative organization of the Emirate of Ras al Khaimah, the name of the main wadi is frequently used as an identifying element of the entire territory covered by its drainage basin.

In the case of Wadi Ghalilah, this drainage sub-basin is very large (76.32 km^{2}), comprising numerous towns, villages and farms widely scattered throughout its valleys and mountains. Naturally, it also includes all the ravines and tributaries of the main wadi.

The same denomination is also used for postal purposes.

For this reason, the mistake of considering that this is the only name that corresponds to all the different wadis, and even to some population centers in this region, is widespread, frequently ignoring the true name of each of these places.

This has contributed to the tributaries of the Wadi Ghalilah: Wadi Litibah, Wadi Barut, Wadi Halhal and Wadi Khabb being sometimes incorrectly called Wadi Ghalilah.

== Geology and population ==
The geographical area of Wadi Ghalilah, highly valued in geological studies of marine sediments, it was inhabited by tribes was historically populated by the semi-nomadic Shihuh tribe, section of Bani Shatair (Arabic: بني شطير), distributed in the tribal areas of Maḩābīb, Raḩabah, Banī Sā‘ad and Hammad; and also by the section of Bani Hadiyah (Arabic: بني هدية), which occupied, among other territories, the tribal area of Ahl Sayḩ. According to the 2023 RAK census, the population of Wadi Ghalilah is 1622.

== See also ==
- List of wadis of the United Arab Emirates
- List of mountains in the United Arab Emirates
- List of wadis of Oman
- List of mountains in Oman
