= Ghalilah =

- Location within United Arab Emirates
- Coordinates: 25°59′51″N 56°4′28″E
- Country: United Arab Emirates
- Emirate: Ras Al Khaimah
- Elevation: 48 m (157 ft)

Ghalilah is a settlement in Ras Al Khaimah, in the United Arab Emirates (UAE). The location of a major desalination plant, Ghalilah also gives its name to the Wadi Ghalilah, the location of the 'Stairway to Heaven' hike.
