= Jabal Ar Rahrah =

Mountain in the UAE

- Jabal Ar Raḩraḩ
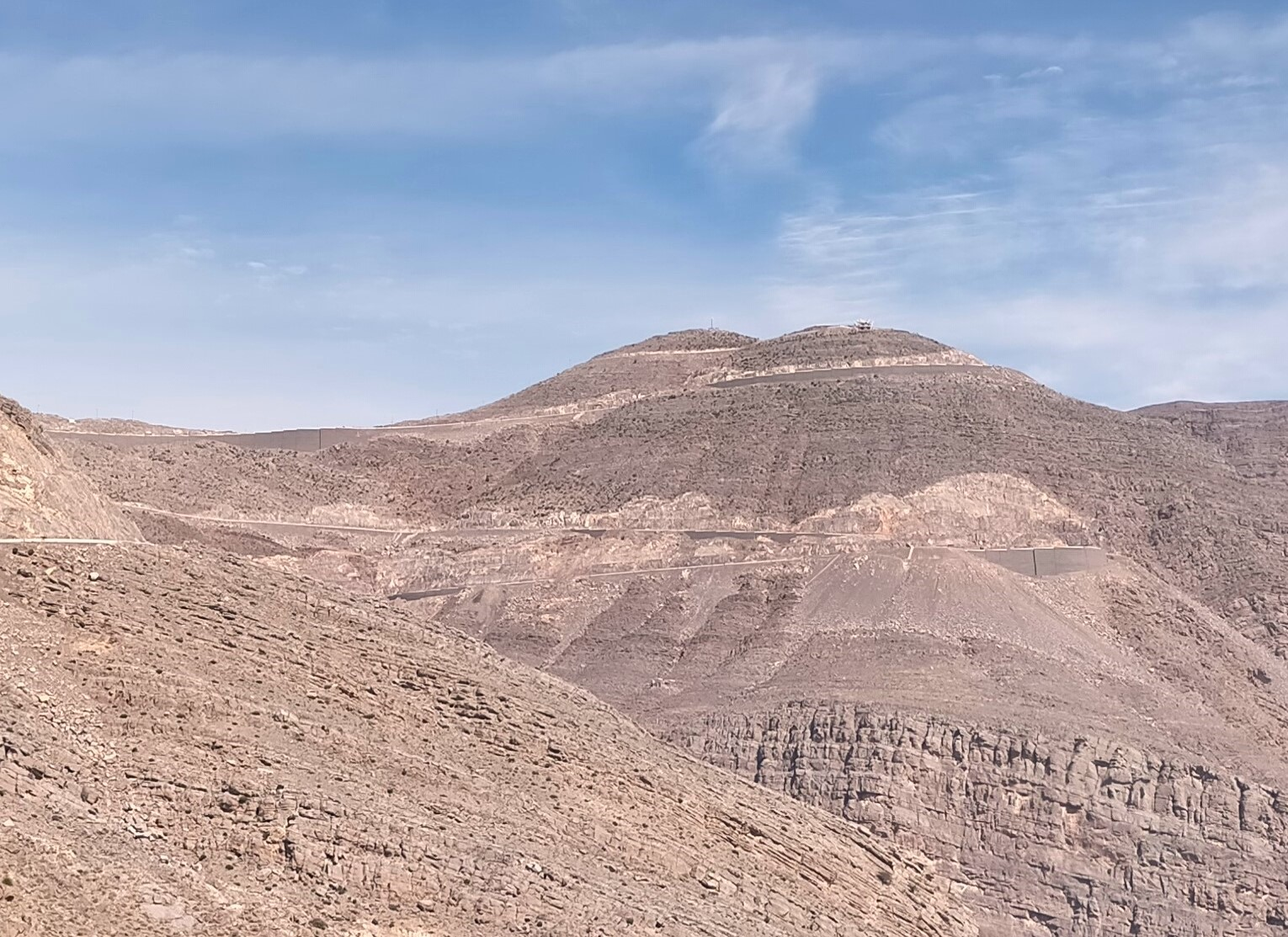

Highest point
- Elevation: 1,691 m (5,548 ft)
- Prominence: 71 m (233 ft)
- Isolation: 850 m (0.53 mi)
- Coordinates: 25°56′39.1″N 56°09′07.9″E

Naming
- Native name: جبل الراعي (Arabic)

Geography
- Location within United Arab Emirates Location within Persian Gulf Location within West and Central Asia
- Country: United Arab Emirates
- Emirate: Ras Al Khaimah
- Parent range: Hajar Mountains

Jabal Ar Rahrah (Arabic: جبل الراعي, romanized: Jabal Ar Raḩraḩ) is a peak in the Hajar Mountains, northeast of the United Arab Emirates, in the Emirate of Ras Al Khaimah. It has a height of 1,691 metres (5,548 feet), and is situated entirely within the United Arab Emirates.

== Population ==
The geographical area of Jabal Ar Rahrah was historically populated by the tribe Bani Shatair (Arabic: بني شطير), one of the two main sections of the Shihuh seminomadic tribe, which occupied, among other territories, the Shihuh tribal area Bani Bakhit.

== Geographical features ==
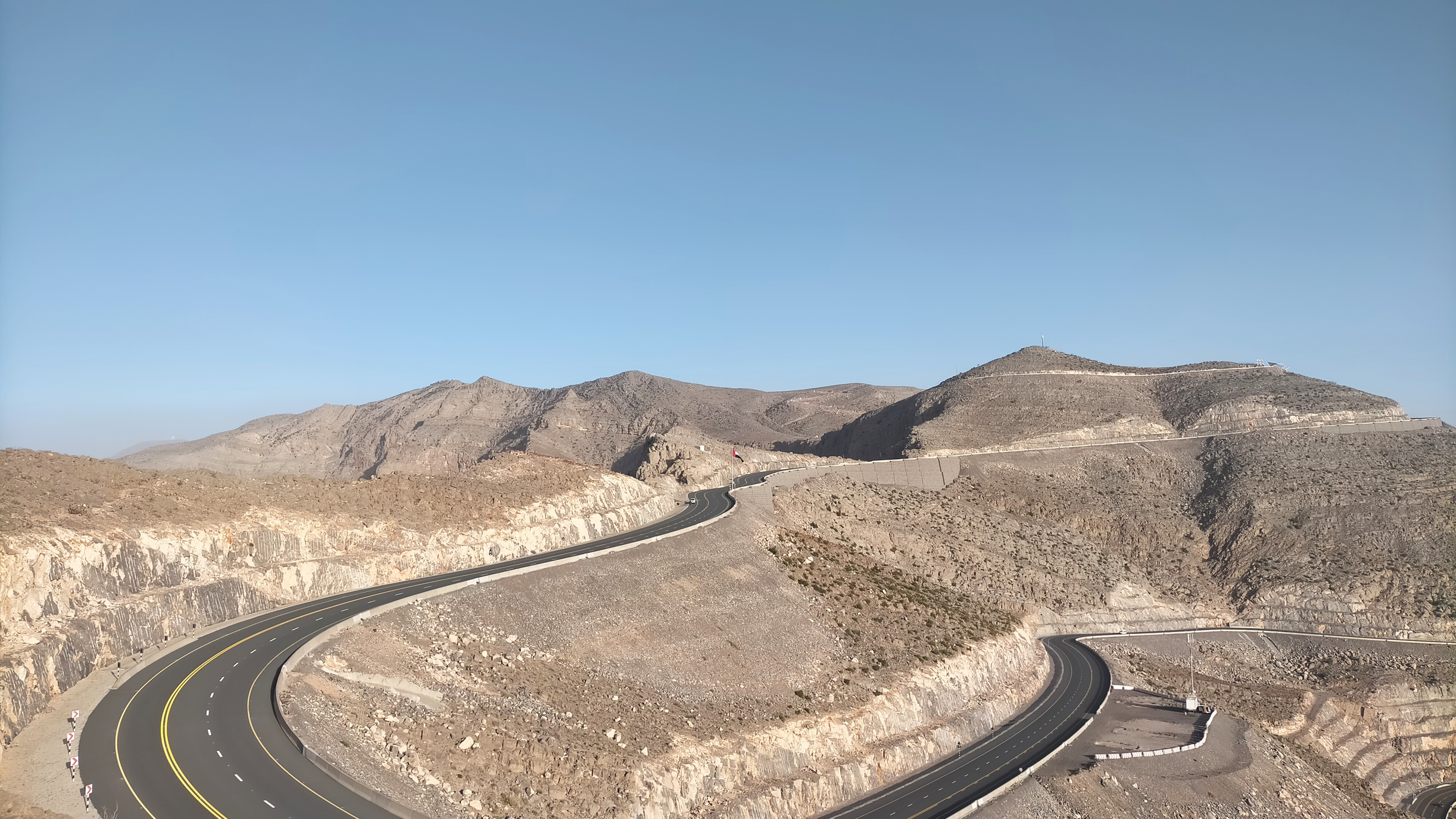
Jabal Ar Rahrah seen from the northwest

Jabal ar Rahrah is the highest mountain in the United Arab Emirates, located entirely on its territory, 3.37 km (2.09 mi) southwest of Jebel Jais / Jabal Bil 'Ays 1,911 m (6,270 ft), whose summit is, however, in the Musandam Governorate, in the Sultanate of Oman.

Jabal ar Rahrah's altitude may seem modest when compared to mountainous locations in other parts of the world, but considering that much of the country has predominantly flat relief, Jabal ar Rahrah represents a notable exception.

In this sense, the highest mountains in the Emirates, located entirely within its territory, or with its peak located exactly on the border with Oman, are the following:

  - Jabal as Sayh (1,746 m) Emirate of Ras Al Khaimah (On the border between UAE and Oman) - Coordinates 25.971889°N, 56.191667°E
  - Jabal ar Rahrah (1,691 m) Emirate of Ras Al Khaimah - Coordinates 25.94419°N, 56.15219°E
  - Jabal Sal (1,575 m) Emirate of Ras Al Khaimah (On the border between UAE and Oman) - Coordinates 25.93251°N, 56.16921°E
  - Jabal Harf Tila (1,568 m) Emirate of Ras Al Khaimah (On the border between UAE and Oman) - Coordinates 25°41'21.4"N 56°09'30.6"E
  - Jabal Rahabah (1,543 m) Emirate of Ras Al Khaimah - Coordinates 25.92610°N, 56.11689°E
  - Jabal Yibir / Jabal Al-Mebrah (1,527 m) Emirate of Fujairah - Coordinates 25.64860°N, 56.12860°E
  - Jabal Yabānah (1,480 m) Emirate of Ras Al Khaimah (On the border between UAE and Oman) - Coordinates 25.87500°N, 56.16000°E
  - Jabal Shintal (1,435 m) Emirate of Ras Al Khaimah - Coordinates 25.94184°N, 56.13511°E
  - Jabal Al Ahqab / Jabal Qada‘ah (1,375 m) Emirate of Ras Al Khaimah - Coordinates 25.77781°N, 56.14190°E

== Toponymy ==
Alternative Names: Jabal Rahah, Jabal Rāḩah, Jabal ar Rahrah, Jabal ar Raḩraḩ.

The name of Jabal Ar Rahrah was recorded in the documentation and maps produced between 1950 and 1960 by the British Arabist, cartographer, military officer, and diplomat Julian F. Walker, during the work carried out to establish borders between what was then called Trucial States, later completed by the Ministry of Defence (United Kingdom), on 1:100,000 scale maps published in 1971.

It also appears, with the spelling Jabal Ar Raḩraḩ, in the National Atlas of the United Arab Emirates.

== Climate ==
The climate is dry. The average temperature is 28 °C (82 °F). The hottest month is June, at 36 °C (97 °F), and the coldest, January, at 16 °C (61 °F). The average precipitation is 184 mm (7.2 in) per year. The rainiest month is November, with 37 mm (1.5 in) of rain, and the driest is August, with 2 mm (0.079 in).

== See also ==
- List of mountains in the United Arab Emirates
- List of wadis of the United Arab Emirates

== Maps and bibliography ==
- Heard-Bey, Frauke (2005). From Trucial States to United Arab Emirates : a society in transition. London: Motivate. pp. 78–87. ISBN 1860631673. OCLC 64689681.
- Lorimer, John (1915). Gazetteer of the Persian Gulf. British Government, Bombay. p. 735.
- Said., Zahlan, Rosemarie (2016). The Origins of the United Arab Emirates : a Political and Social History of the Trucial States. Taylor and Francis. p. 51. ISBN 9781317244653. OCLC 945874284.
