= Ghubb =

- Location within United Arab Emirates
- Coordinates: 25°48′32″N 55°59′27″E
- Country: United Arab Emirates
- Emirate: Ras al-Khaimah
- Elevation: 12 m (39 ft)

Ghubb is a suburb of the city of Ras Al Khaimah, United Arab Emirates (UAE).
