= Bani Hadiyah =

Bedouin tribe of the United Arab Emirates

The Bani Hadiyah (Arabic: بني هدية) is a tribe of the United Arab Emirates (UAE), originating in Ras Al Khaimah and also in areas of Northern Oman.

The Bani Hadiyah is one of two main sections of the Shihuh tribe. The other is the Bani Shatair. The Bani Hadiyah is also divided into sections, including the Kumzarah and Habus. Traditionally, the Shihuh changed domicile, taking work in Ras Al Khaimah, including the villages of Sha'am and Rams during the pearling season and farming in the Ruus Al Jibal area of the Hajar Mountains during the winter.

The relationship between the Shihuh and the Rulers of Ras Al Khaimah was often fractious, and both Rams and Sha'am seceded several times before, in 1921, becoming part of the recognised Trucial State of Ras Al Khaimah.
