= Shihuh =

Bedouin tribe of the United Arab Emirates and Oman

- Arab tribe
- The Shihuh tribe's flag. It was recorded by British researchers Richard N. Schofield and Gerald H. Blake. Officer Julian F. Walker also noted it in his boundary files for the Muscat–Trucial States
- Ethnicity: Arab
- Location: United Arab Emirates; Oman; Qatar
- Branches: Bani Hadiyah (Bani Muhammad, Bani Hamood, Bani Ali, Bani Ham Mazyud, Khanazirah); Bani Shatair (Khanabil, Kumzarah, Mahabib, Maqadilah)
- Language: Arabic (Shihhi, Emirati, Omani) Kumzari
- Religion: Islam

The Shihuh (Arabic: الشحوح, ash-Shiḥūḥ) is an Arab tribe living in the United Arab Emirates (UAE) and Oman. In the singular, the name is Al Shehhi, a common family name in the UAE and Oman today. Inhabiting the northern part of the Hajar Mountain range, specifically in the Ruus Al Jibal (Musandam Peninsula), the tribe has long been influential in the affairs of both the east and west coast settlements of the northern UAE and Oman and has fiercely maintained both its identity and independence.

== Sections ==
The Shihuh are divided into two main sections, the Bani Hadiyah and Bani Shatair. The Bani Hadiyah splits into several subsections: the Bani Muhammad; Bani Ali; Bani Ham Mazyud and Khanazirah. The Bani Shatair splits into the Khanabil; Kumazarah; Mahabib and Maqadilah.

At the turn of the 20th century, the tribe numbered some 21,500 people and was mostly settled around the Rus Al Jibal mountains, as well as Sha'am, Ghalilah, Ghubb and Khor Khwair in Ras Al Khaimah. In total, some 14,500 Shihuh had settled the coast, while 7,000 inhabited the mountainous interior, although the members of the tribe would travel seasonally between both domains. The Bani Hadiyah are mostly to be found on the western coast of the UAE, including Khasab, Oman, which would be their principal village. The Bani Shatair are centered around Kumzar, also at the tip of the peninsula. In general, the Shihuh inhabited the mountains to the north of Wadi Bih, while the closely allied Habus tribe settled the wadis and farms to the south of the wadi.

== Languages and lifestyle ==
The Shihuh were essentially agricultural during the winter months, when they would form communities inhabiting the stone-built buildings in the mountains, channelling the available water run-off from the mountains (there are no wells in the mountains) to irrigate their stepped fields. In the warmer months, they migrated mainly to work during the date season, typically to Khasab, Dibba and the Batinah coast of Oman. They also participated in the pearl fishing season. They maintained large herds of goats, the source of rare surplus for them to trade for other commodities. Because of the nature of their frequently hand-to-mouth existence in the mountains, arable land was particularly prized, a fact which has been used to explain the predominance of Bint Amm (daughter of my uncle) marriages among the Shihuh (land forming part of the marriage dowry).

The lifestyle and distinctive dialect of the Shihuh is markedly different to that of the desert Bedouin of the UAE and these differences led to the Shihuh being dubbed as being of non-Arab descent – to the point where some traditions had them as of Portuguese extraction. Research has shown that the tribe incorporates elements of Iranian origin, the Kumazarah subsection speaking an Iranian language. The Arab element of the tribe's make-up, the majority, is thought to be linked to the wave of immigration from Yemen, which brought groups of Malik bin Fahm immigrants north in the second century. Bertram Thomas described the dialect of the Kumazarah as "...a strange tongue which has baffled and confused strangers. It is a compound of Arabic and Persian but it is distinct from them both, and is intelligible neither to the Arab nor to the Persian nor yet to the linguist of both."

The unique axe of the Shihuh people, known as the Jerz, is long handled with a small head.

== History ==
Historically, the Shihuh were difficult to govern and their principal northern villages were often secessionist, depending on the inaccessibility of the terrain they inhabited. They were frequently in conflict with the Sharqiyin of the east coast of the UAE, but would settle their differences to make common cause against the central authority represented by Sharjah when the Sharqiyin made one of their numerous attempts to shake off that yoke. The Shihuh were frequently in conflict with the Al Qasimi of both Sharjah and Ras Al Khaimah and were generally more ready to accept the Suzerainty of Muscat. However, their economic needs crossed borders and Shihuh often had property or other holdings subject to Ras Al Khaimah or Sharjah. The village of Sha'am is a good example of a territory that became economically and therefore politically dependent on Ras Al Khaimah, even though its Shihuh population originated in the Rus Al Jibal and would have been considered Omani.

=== The battle for Rams ===
Sheikh Sultan bin Salim Al Qasimi took Ras Al Khaimah to full independence from Sharjah in 1921 and was determined to maintain the integrity of the emirate, despite a number of secessionist influences. One such was keenly felt at Rams where the headman, Abdelrahman bin Saleh Al Tanaiji, concluded an alliance with the Shihuh. Sultan bin Salim made a complaint to the British Agent, which yielded no effective response, and in June 1921, fighting broke out. Sheikh Saeed bin Maktoum bin Hasher Al Maktoum of Dubai tried to mediate in the clash, which was disrupting the pearling season (Sultan bin Salim had augmented his fighting force by bringing in all of the available pearl divers as additional troops).

It was eventually the risk of loss to the Indian merchant community (British subjects) that led the British to take action to solve the dispute and, in July 1921, HMS Cyclamen arrived off Rams, where a four-month truce had already been agreed between the Shihuh and Abdelrahman's brother, Muhammad bin Saleh Al Tanaiji, the new wali. Abdelrahman himself was dead, murdered by his cousin, Salim. The new treaty agreed that Muhammad bin Saleh recognised the suzerainty of Sultan bin Salim and Sultan bin Salim agreed to punish the murderer of his brother. It did not last three days until the parties fell out again and a further treaty negotiation took place with the Sheikhs of the Shihuh and the President of the Muscat Council's private secretary. This time, Muhammad bin Saleh and Sultan bin Salim were both sent into custody in Sharjah but broke out and returned to Rams with a force of Shihhu where fighting once again broke out. The final treaty, signed on 22 February 1922, broke the tie between the Shihuh and Muhammad bin Saleh and endured.

=== Shaping Dibba and Kalba ===
The Shihuh and their historical influence over events shaped Dibba, an eastern town which is the confluence of three borders: Sharjah and Fujairah in the UAE and Oman. The wali of Dibba in 1855 was killed by Shihuh tribesmen. Named Mashari, the man's brother was wali of Ras Al Khaimah. The pattern of rivalry between the townsfolk of Dibba and the Shihuh was established and by 1871 the depredations of the Shihuh were impacting the revenues of the town. The position of wali at Dibba being at times made almost untenable by this rivalry, in 1926 the wali signed a treaty with the Shihuh which however broke down on his death in 1932. The new wali lost no time in appealing to Muscat for protection, hoisting the Omani flag above his fort. This led the Ruler of Sharjah, Sultan bin Saqr Al Qasimi II, to protest to the British, who stated that Dibba was Sharjah territory. The result has been the creation of Dibba as a Sharjah town with Oman to the north and Fujairah to the south which has, as it has expanded, become a town with three Rulers.

Likewise, the wali of Kalba was more or less dependent on Shihuh goodwill and influence and they played the role of 'king maker' on more than one occasion.

British frustration with the wide-ranging conflicts between settled populations and the Shihuh led in 1926 to a proposal to rehouse them at Kalba - and give them control of the Shamailiyah, an area which represents the whole east coast of the present UAE (including newly independent Fujairah) and therefore reduce the clashes which were taking place between Shihuh and the local populations of the villages on the north-west coast. In the end the proposal came to nothing.

== See also ==
- Nadba - A ceremonial battle cry native to the Shihuh.
- Ahmed Mansoor al-Shehhi
- Marwan al-Shehhi
