= Bani Shatair =

Bedouin tribe of the United Arab Emirates

Bani Shatair (Arabic: بني شطير) (singular Arabic: الشطيري Al-Shutairi) is a tribal name, originating in Ras Al Khaimah, in the United Arab Emirates (UAE) and in areas of Northern Oman.

The Bani Shatair is one of two main sections of the Shihuh tribe. The other is the Bani Hadiyah. These are also divided into sections, such as the Kumzarah and Habus. Traditionally, the Shihuh changed domicile, taking work in Ras Al Khaimah and Rams during the pearling season and farming in the Ruus Al Jibal area of the Hajar Mountains during the winter.

The village of Sha'am, traditionally a dependency of Ras Al Khaimah, was originally settled entirely by the Bani Shatair. The relationship between the Shihhu and the Rulers of Ras Al Khaimah was often fractious, and Sha'am seceded several times before, in 1921, becoming part of the recognised Trucial State of Ras Al Khaimah.
