= Julian F. Walker =

British Arabist and diplomat (1929–2018)

Sir Julian Fortay Walker CMG MBE
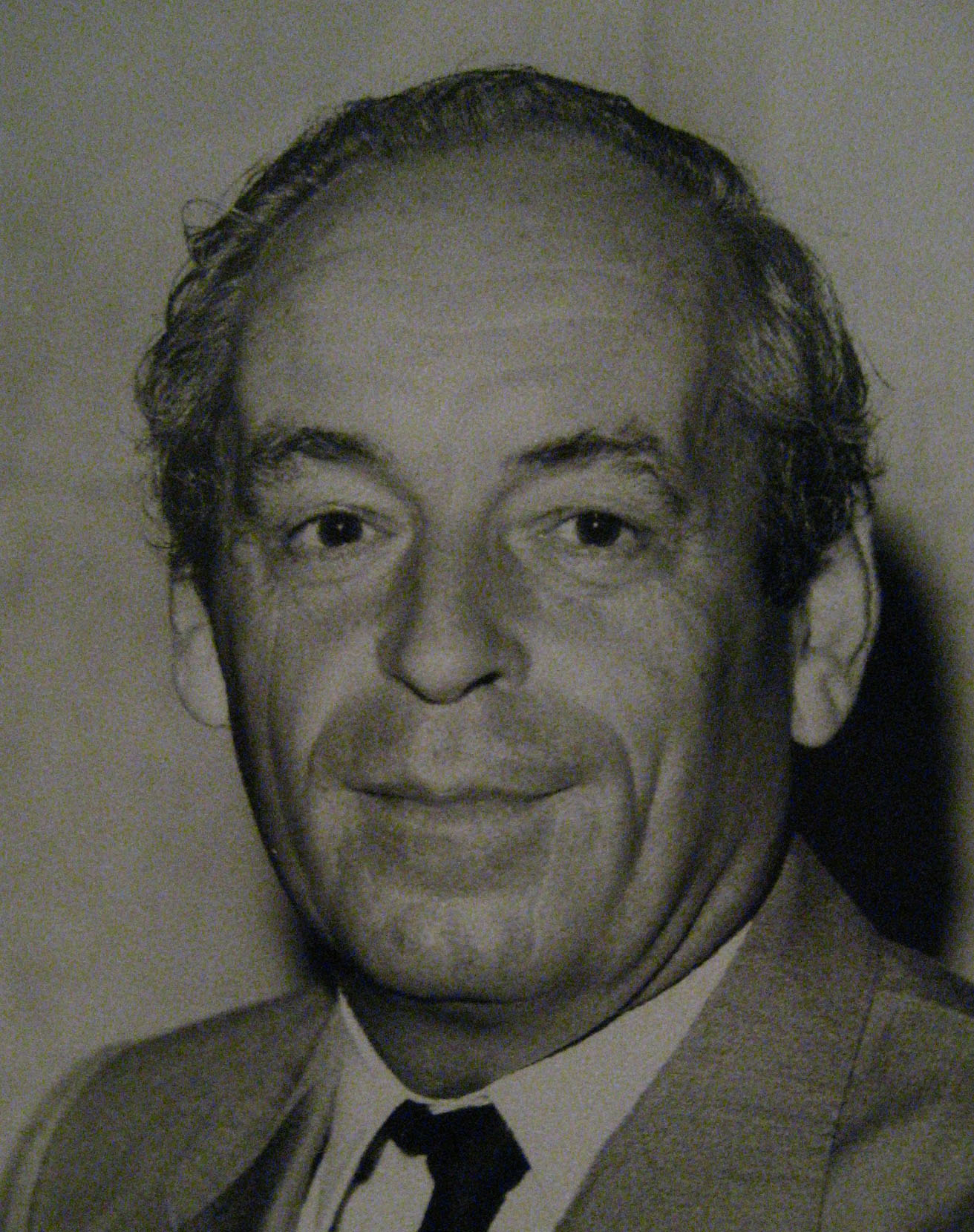
- Julian Walker in the 1980s

British ambassador to Qatar
- In office 1984–1987
- Prime Minister: Margaret Thatcher
- Succeeded by: Patrick Nixon
- Preceded by: Stephen Day

British ambassador to North Yemen
- In office 1979–1984
- Prime Minister: Margaret Thatcher
- Preceded by: Benjamin Strachan
- Succeeded by: David Tatham

Director of Middle East Centre for Arab Studies
- In office 1977–1978
- Succeeded by: Position abolished

Political Adviser for the British Military Government in West Berlin
- In office 1973–1976

Consul-General of the United Kingdom to the United Arab Emirates
- In office 2 December 1971 – 8 July 1972
- Prime Minister: Edward Heath
- Preceded by: Office established; Himself as the British Political Agent in Dubai
- Succeeded by: Albert Edward Saunders

Political Agent of the United Kingdom to the Trucial States in Dubai
- In office 27 January 1971 – 1 December 1971
- Prime Minister: Edward Heath
- Preceded by: Julian Bullard
- Succeeded by: Office abolished; Himself as the British Consul-General in Dubai

Personal details
- Born: 7 May 1929 London, England
- Died: 7 July 2018 (aged 89) London, England
- Resting place: Weybridge Cemetery
- Parents: Kenneth Macfarlane Walker (father); Eileen Marjorie Wilson (mother)
- Education: School of Oriental and African Studies; Middle East Centre for Arab Studies
- Occupation: Diplomat; cartographer; land surveyor
- Nickname: Boundary Walker

Military service
- Allegiance: United Kingdom
- Branch/service: British Army
- Years of service: 1947–1949

Sir Julian Fortay Walker (Arabic: جوليان فورت ووكر, romanized: Jūliyān Fūrti Wūkar; 7 May 1929 – 7 July 2018), also known by his initials J. F. Walker, was a British Arabist, author, cartographer, land surveyor, military officer and diplomat who worked closely with Sheikh Rashid while serving as the last British representative to the Trucial States in Dubai for 11-months during the unification of the United Arab Emirates in 1971. He played an instrumental role in demarcating the present boundaries of the country's emirates as well as its borders with Oman during his capacity as an assistant political officer in the Trucial States and colonial Bahrain between the 1950s and 1960s.

In his diplomatic career spanning almost 40 years, he served in various positions at places like Bahrain, Oman, Iraq, Morocco, West Berlin, Northern Ireland, Lebanon and Norway. He was also appointed as Britain's ambassador to North Yemen from 1979 to 1984 and then Qatar between 1984 and 1987. He was the son of British urologist and philosopher Kenneth Macfarlane Walker.

== Early life and career ==
Julian Fortay Walker was born in London, United Kingdom on 7 May 1929 to British urologist and philosopher Kenneth Macfarlane Walker and Eileen Marjorie Wilson. He joined the British Armed Forces in August 1947 and served till September 1949.

=== Career ===
In September 1952, he was appointed as a member of the British foreign service. A month later, he began attending an Arabic course at the School of Oriental and African Studies, University of London and as per some sources, he also attended the Middle East Centre for Arab Studies in Shemlan, Lebanon. He was transferred to Dubai in December 1953, which was then part of the Trucial States during the reign of Sheikh Saeed bin Hasher al-Maktoum. He was later appointed as a third secretary at the British embassy in Bahrain in November 1955, and later regarded as second secretary in April 1956. He was transferred to the Foreign Office in June 1957. In July 1960, he was posted as the second secretary at the British Embassy in Oslo, Norway and was later regraded as first secretary in July 1961. In October 1963, he was transferred as the first secretary to the Foreign Office.

=== Trucial States and Bahrain ===
Walker first arrived in Sharjah after graduating from Middle East Centre for Arab Studies during the reign of Sheikh Saqr bin Sultan al-Qasimi and then went to Dubai under the Political Agent Christopher Pirie-Gordon as an assistant political officer in December 1953 when it was part of the Trucial States during the reign of Sheikh Saeed bin Hasher al-Maktoum. During his stay in the Trucial States (1953-1955) and colonial Bahrain (1955-1957), who were altogether colonial territories of the United Kingdom's Persian Gulf Residency, he was tasked with demarcating up the borders of the emirates that were ruled by different sheikhs. In an interview given to a researcher in Durham, England in July 1991, Walker said that the pressure to demarcate the boundaries between the Trucial Sheikhdoms was due to oil.

Oil prospecting on the Trucial Coast made the local oil company, Petroleum Development Trucial Coast (PDTC), keen that the boundaries between the various Shaikhdoms there should be defined

— Julian Fortay Walker, 1991

Walker's senior, Gordon started the arbitration work by touring the boundary between the two sheikhdoms of Umm al-Quwain and Ras al-Khaimah. He began his work in April 1954 and was so disillusioned by his first day's experience in the field, that he decided that it would not be possible for him to carry out the work necessary for boundary arbitration and abandoned it in preference for his normal office work. In his place, he delegated the boundary work to his assistant in the Political Agency, Julian Walker

Walker travelled across the territories of the emirates and sheikhdoms in a government-owned Land Rover vehicle where he used to engage with tribesmen and then consult with Sheikh Zayed and Sheikh Shakbut while drawing up the borders. His interest in cartography and boundary disputes earned him the nickname Boundary Walker by his colleagues.

=== Mapping and survey ===
According to the report Walker submitted in March 1955 on Trucial States frontier settlement, the following principles to establish ownership of a territory were taken as the basis for internal boundary settlement, listed in approximate order of importance:

- Control of several years' standing in an area, and tribal recognition of that control.
- The collection of zakat (on crops).
- The allegiance of tribesmen settled in the area.
- Historical evidence: divided into 5 subjects as follows: agreements, zakat, settlement of disputes, past occupation and development and use of territory
- Ownership of property

In his 1954 survey, Walker found out that the relationship between tribes and boundaries is crucial and political boundaries are defined by tribal loyalties to specific sheikhs, the very reason internal boundaries shown on the Trucial States map being based on tribal loyalties. Those loyalties are conditional and subject to change. Boundaries between the Trucial States and its neighbors, and boundaries between individual Trucial States, periodically shifted during the 19th and 20th centuries due to the boundaries being based on the dirah of the tribes. Dirah in Eastern Arabia were flexibly defined areas, changing in size according to tribal strength.

During the survey Walker encountered many obstacles. What maps of the area existed were far from accurate, and for some areas there were no maps at all. Thus, he had to make his own maps and he started by climbing mountains to sketch the countryside around about. The heat of summer proved to be another obstacle for Walker, which overtook him and his small team and made travel more difficult. Accordingly, he was trying to hurry to finish his survey in the cooler months. The most pressing difficulty was the requirement for speed and progress.

After several years of surveys and negotiations, Walker was able to settle only some of the conflicting territorial claims, with the rest remaining unresolved. In May 1955, Walker presented the boundaries report, including his recommendations on disputed boundary settlements.

Following the completion of Walker's field survey, J. P. Tripp, the Political Agent in Dubai, sent official letters during 1956 and 1957 to the Trucial Coast sheikhs informing them of their sheikhdom's boundaries.

In a 2002 interview with the Gulf News, he said that he also took the help of a map of Abu Dhabi made by British explorer and military officer Wilfred Thesiger and had completed the mapping of the emirates of Abu Dhabi, Dubai, Ajman and Fujairah by the 1950s and 1960s before he was transferred back to London and then to Oslo, Norway. In February 1963, based on the information provided by Walker, the Research Department of the Foreign Office prepared the first official map of the internal boundaries in the Trucial States.

His 31 hand-drawn maps were used to create proper formal maps by British Foreign Office for government use. Owing to the complexities, exclaves and enclaves the boundaries of the emirates and sheikhdoms shared with each other, the maps were informally called as Mr. Walker's Jigsaw Puzzle, and to this day, constitutes much of the present-day federal borders of the Emirates of the United Arab Emirates. Walker argued in a July 1991 interview with a researcher in Durham, England that "the concepts of nation states, of territorial sovereignty, and of fixed linear frontiers are Western ones, which have been imposed on the traditional society of the Arabian Peninsula".

=== Return to the Trucial States and formation of the United Arab Emirates ===
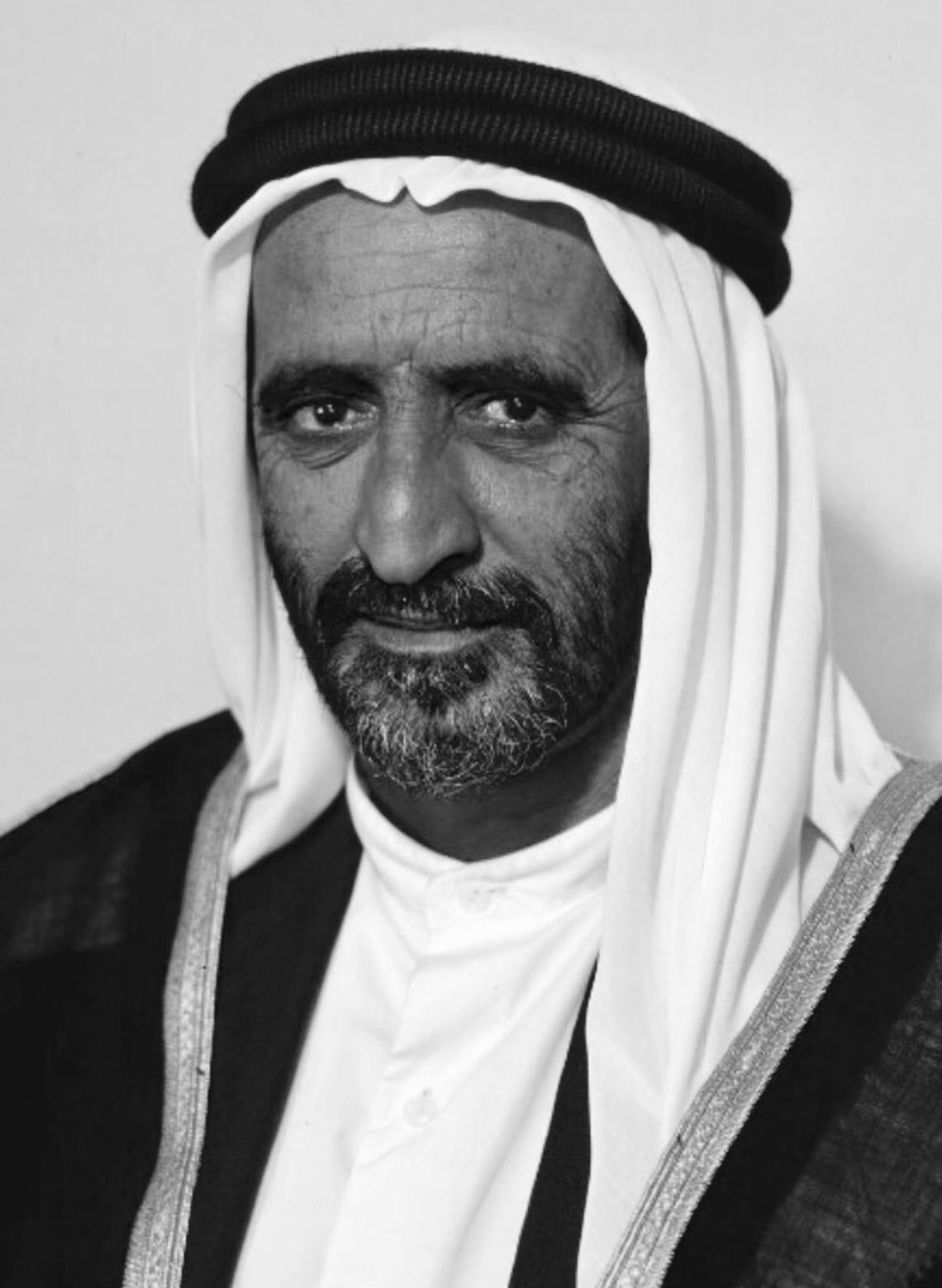
Sheikh Rashid of Dubai, whom Walker served as an advisor in 1971

The British government under prime minister Harold Wilson in January 1968 had publicly announced his administration's will to initiate the withdrawal and disengagement of the United Kingdom from the Persian Gulf by the end of 1971. This announcement came as a surprise for the Gulf rulers, especially of Trucial States, Bahrain and Qatar. His policy was carried forward by his successor, Edward Heath. In January 1971, Walker was reposted in the Trucial States, this time as London's last political agent to oversee the Britain's smooth withdrawal and to take part in an ongoing effort to bring the sheikhs and emirs to the negotiating table to discuss the future of the region once the Britain leaves. In an interview given to a researcher in Durham, England on 19 July 1991, Walker said:

Dubai and Abu Dhabi were about to be alone, but the others were too small and if they became independent alone they will not stay long. Fujairah might go to Oman, Sharjah and Ras al-Khaimah would follow Saudi Arabia and Dubai is friendly with Iran, that might have created problems. The British role was to get the Council of the rulers to be strong enough to provide an umbrella for them.

— Julian Fortay Walker

Walker was also part of the negotiating team led by Sir William Luce where he tried to mediate for the disputed islands of Abu Musa and Greater and Lesser Tunbs that were being claimed by Iran from Sharjah and Ras al-Khaimah respectively.

After the declaration of the independence of the United Arab Emirates on 2 December 1971, Walker was appointed as the first Consul-General of the United Kingdom to the United Arab Emirates in Dubai, a position he held till 1972. Afterwards, he went to West Berlin where he was posted as a political adviser for the British Military Government between 1973 and 1976. He then went to Shemlan, Lebanon where served as the last director of the Middle East Centre for Arab Studies (MECAS) from 1977 to 1978, when the institution was closed down due to the ensuing Lebanese civil war. He was then appointed as the British ambassador to North Yemen in 1979 where he served till 1984, and then as the British envoy to Qatar from 1984 to 1987. Following the end of the 1991 Gulf war, he worked with a United Nations-led committee on resolving the Iraq-Kuwait border issues.

== Retirement and later life ==
Walker retired in 1993. In 1999, he published an eight volume collection of the boundaries of the United Arab Emirates and Oman titled Tyro on the Trucial Coast. He served as the secretary at the Kurdish Cultural Centre Limited from September 2003 till January 2006. He also served as the director of BDG Management Limited from November 2005 to February 2010 and lastly as the director of Forty Grove Park Gardens Management Limited between July 2013 and June 2017.

=== 2004 John Shaw controversy and corruption charges ===
The Los Angeles Times reported in 2004, that Walker was on the board of Guardian Net, whose bid for a mobile contract in Iraq was favored by Pentagon official John A. Shaw, over the objections of two other US officials, Daniel Sudnick and Bonnie Carroll. Mother Jones reported that Walker was on the board of Qualcomm, whose technology would have been used in the Guardian Net bid. It reported that Walker had ties to Shaw and he was hired by him as a contract investigator to look into the illegal arms trade in Iraq, a position that had him working out of Shaw's office in the Pentagon. However, Shaw later dismissed these allegations in an interview with the Los Angeles Times.

=== Occasional visits to the UAE ===
After his retirement from diplomatic career in 1993, Walker would regularly visit the United Arab Emirates to attend seminars and conferences besides having sit-down with journalists and historians during his spare time.

In an interview to the Khaleej Times in 2005 during his visit to the United Arab Emirates to attend the conferenced titled Bedouin Society in the Emirates, he said that three disputed islands of Abu Musa, Greater and Lesser Tunbs rightfully belong to the United Arab Emirates and that the Imperial Iranian Navy under Shah of Iran Reza Pahlavi had forcefully annexed the islands in November 1971.

While on his visit to the United Arab Emirates in 2008, he visited the Petroleum Institute in Abu Dhabi in March where he gave a lecture on the history of Abu Dhabi between the 1920s and 1950s. He sat down with the Abu Dhabi-based The National newspaper, where he told that the Dubai had initially hoped that it could survive as an autonomous independent city-state under the protection of the Shah of Pahlavi Iran before Sheikh Zayed convinced Sheikh Rashid to form a union between the two emirates in order to avoid conflict among the northern emirates and avert meddling of other Gulf states in the region.

In November 2010, he was a key speaker at a three-day seminar themed ‘The Memoirs of the Nation through Oral Narratives’ in Abu Dhabi, United Arab Emirates.

== Personal life and death ==
After his retirement in 1993, Walker retreated to a house in Chiswick district of London. During his posting as a political officer in the colonial territories of Persian Gulf Residency in the 1950s and 1960s, Walker used to personally meet several sheikhs and emirs of different sheikhdoms and emirates. He had a close relationship with Sheikh Zayed and his brother Sheikh Hazza. He had personally known Sheikh Shakbut and Sheikh Rashid during several meetings that he held with them for the purpose of border demarcations. He enjoyed music, cooking and gardening.

=== Death ===
Walker died on 7 July 2018 in London, United Kingdom. He was buried in Weybridge Cemetery, Weybridge.

== Awards and nominations ==
- Order of the British Empire, 1960
- Companion of the Order of St Michael and St George, 1981 Birthday Honours
