= British School of Archaeology =

British School of Archaeology may refer to some of the British International Research Institutes supported by the British Academy, of which now there are eight:

- British School at Athens (BSA), archaeological research institute
- British School at Rome (BSR), interdisciplinary research centre
- British Institute at Ankara (BIAA), formerly the British Institute of Archaeology at Ankara
- British Institute for the Study of Iraq (BISI), London, formerly the British School of Archaeology in Iraq, Baghdad
- Council for British Research in the Levant, with two research institutes:
  - Kenyon Institute, formerly the British School of Archaeology at Jerusalem (BSAJ)
  - British Institute in Amman (BIA), formerly the British Institute at Amman for Archaeology and History (BIAAH)
- British Institute of Eastern Africa (BIEA), Nairobi, Kenya
- British Institute of Persian Studies, London, formerly Teheran (see Iran: Journal of the British Institute of Persian Studies)
- British Institute for Libyan & North African Studies, formerly the Society of Libyan Studies, at University of Leicester
- The British Institute of Afghan Studies, Kabul (1972-1982) is now defunct

== Other Institutes Overseas and Societies partly funded by the British Academy ==
- Egypt Exploration Society (EES), London, British non-profit organisation
- The Committee, Society, and School for South East Asian Studies

== Other organizations not affiliated with the British Academy ==
- British School of Archaeology in Egypt (1905–1954)
