= British Institute =

British Institute may refer to:

== United Kingdom ==
- British Institute of Adult Education (1921–2016)
- British Institute of Brain Injured Children
- British Institute of Eastern Africa
- British Institute of Facilities Management (1993–2018)
- British Institute of Innkeeping
- British Institute of Interior Design
- British Institute of International Affairs
- British Institute for Libyan and Northern African Studies
- British Institute of Management (1948–1992)
- British Institute of Non-Destructive Testing
- British Institute of Organ Studies
- British Institute of Persian Studies
- British Institute of Philosophical Studies
- British Institute of Preventive Medicine
- British Institute of Professional Photography
- British Institute of Public Health
- British Institute of Radiology
- British Institute of Recorded Sound
- British Institute for the Study of Iraq
- British Institute of Technology, England

== Other countries ==
- British Institute in Amman, research institute in Jordan
- British Institute at Ankara, research institute in Turkey
- British Institute of Florence, cultural institute in Italy
- British Institute in Paris (1937–2005), academic body in France

== Other uses ==
- British Institute of Archaeology, multiple institutes
- British Institution, 19th-century art society in London
