= Wadi Jib =

Wadi in the UAE

Wadi Jib Wādī Jib
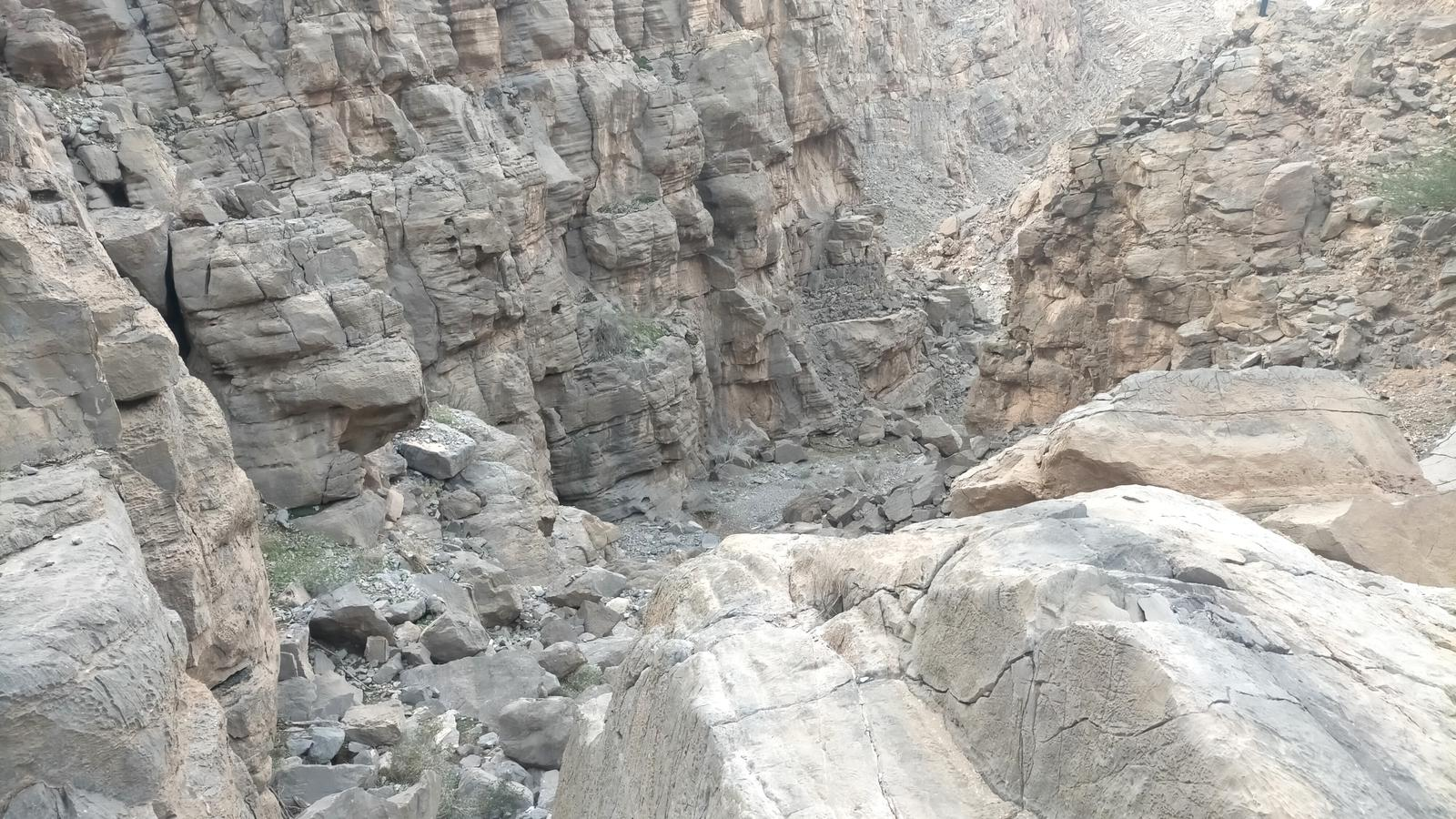
- Wadi Jib, a tributary of Wadi Shah, from its confluence with Wadi Arus

- Location within United Arab Emirates
- Native name: وادي جب (Arabic)

Location
- Country: United Arab Emirates
- Emirate: Ras Al Khaimah

Physical characteristics
- Source: Southern slope of Jabal Ar Rahrah (1,691 m) Al Hajar Mountains
  - elevation: 1,600 m (5,200 ft)
- Mouth: Confluence with the Wadi Arus into the Wadi Shah, after the village of Lahsa
  - coordinates: 25°53′58.3″N 56°08′28.2″E
  - elevation: 550 m (1,800 ft)
- Length: 8 km (5.0 mi)
- Basin size: Wadi Bih: 483 km^{2} (186 mi^{2}); Subbasin Wadi Shah: 72.06 km^{2} (27.82 mi^{2})

Basin features
- River system: Wadi Bih (Subbasin Wadi Shah)
- Tributaries
  - left: Wadi Lahsa
  - right: Ghalil Al Yafar

Wadi Jib (Arabic: وادي جب, romanized: Wādī jb) is a valley or dry river with intermittent flow, which flows almost exclusively during the rainy season, belonging to the drainage basin of Wadi Bih (subbasin of Wadi Shah), north-east of the United Arab Emirates (UAE), in the Emirate of Ras Al Khaimah.

It is a tributary of the Wadi Shah / Wadi Shehah / Wādī Shaḩḩah, from its confluence with the Wadi Arus, and is formed mainly by the ravines and gullies that run along the southern slopes of the Jabal Ar Rahrah (1,691 m; 5,548 ft), divided into two large branches; by the deep cliffs located to the west and at the foot of Jabal Sal) (1,575 m; 5,167 ft), on the border line between UAE and Oman; and by multiple ravines that run along the southeast slope of Jabal Rahabah (1,543 m; 5,062 ft).

== Course ==
In general, the Wadi Jib flows from north to south, the waters it receives from the east and northeast, from the cliffs that define the border between Oman and UAE, form a set of ravines that are distributed as a fan, concentrating on a bend that creates the optical illusion that it is a deep and extensive well surrounded by cliffs, forming a wide rounded and flat space, as if it were a large terrace, which retains soil, moisture and water very well, and which quickly turns green again after a rainy season.

This picturesque place, dotted with palm trees and jujubes (jujubas / سدر / Sidr tree - Ziziphus spina-christi, very common in the Al Hajar Mountains), was known until a few years ago as Palm Paradise, although today it is known as Hidden Oasis by tourists.

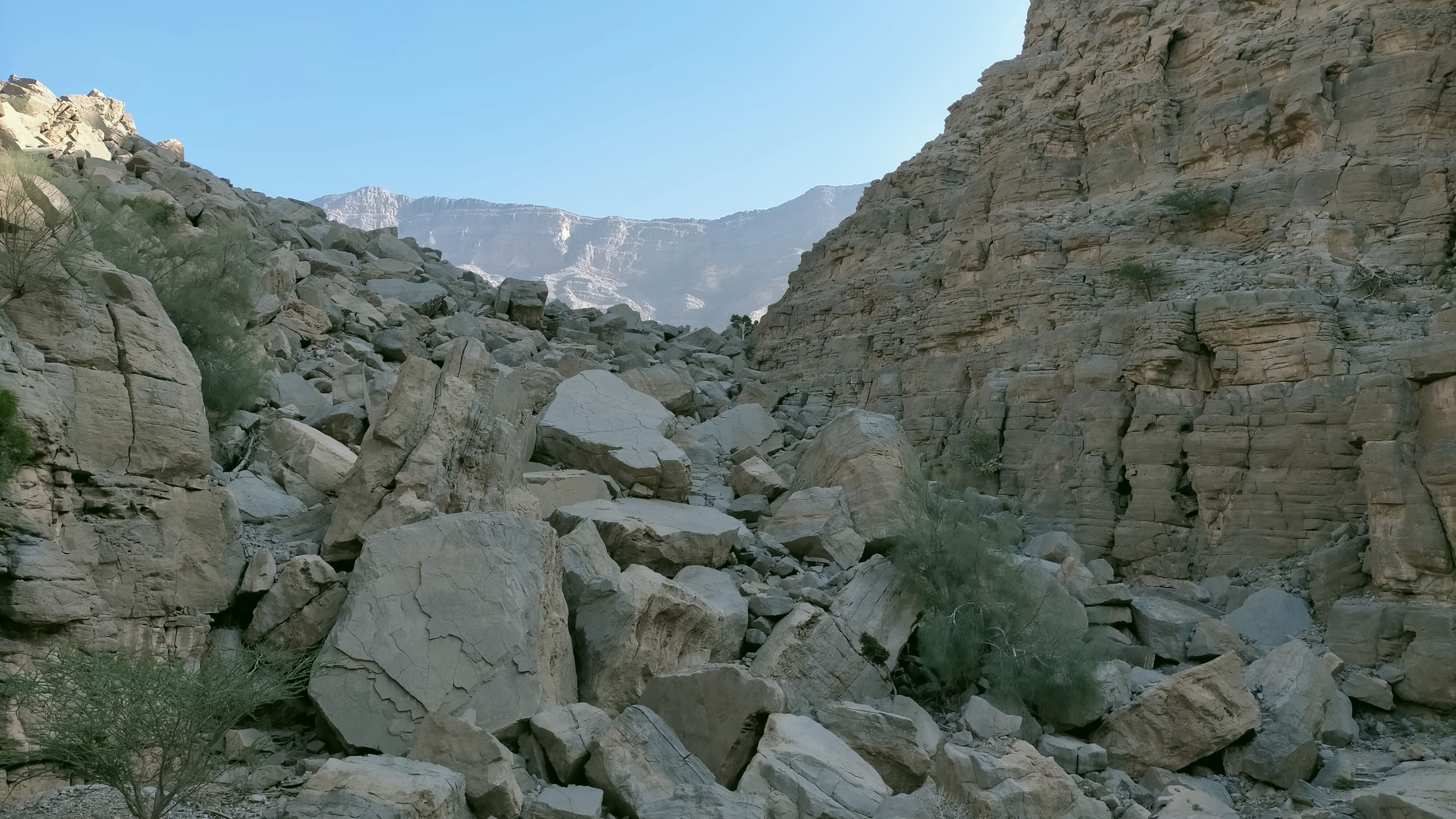
Wadi Jib. Landslide dam. Collapse of the mountain that marked the right side of the canyon

The formation of this silt plain of the Wadi Jib, situated at 730 m (2,400 ft), and which covers an area of approximately 5.5 hectares, originated at some point in its geological evolution as a result of the collapse of the mountain that marked the right side of the canyon that formed the wadi at its exit from this bend, causing an immense plug of rocks and earth, clearly visible today, generating the damming of the waters, and their slow filtration into the subsoil, to resume their natural course a few metres below.

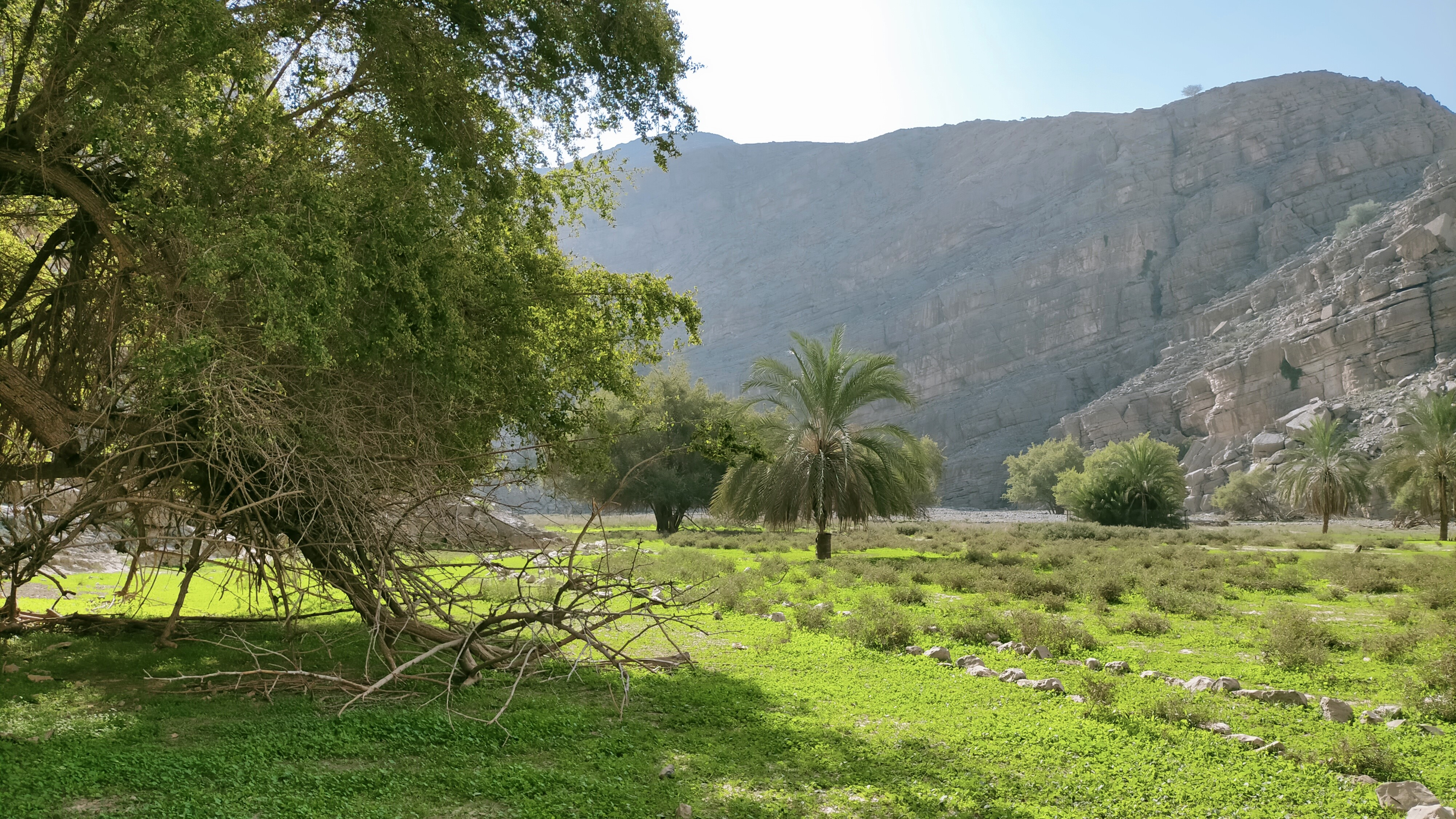
Wadi Jib, tributary of Wadi Shah - Palm Paradise - Hidden Oasis

From this point, the waters coming from the eastern area of Wadi Jib flow westward, concentrated in a single ravine, until they join the branch that descends from the southern slope of Jabal Ar Rahrah, named Ghalīl Al Yafār, to continue later towards the south, receiving the waters of the southeastern slope of Jabal Rahabah, already in the proximities of the village of Lahsa.

Also in Lahsa, a few meters before its confluence with the Wadi Arus, the Wadi Jib is joined by an important ravine, a tributary on the left, which descends from the surroundings of the town of Musaibat, of which there is no historical toponymic identification, but which is currently called Wadi Lahsa (Wādī Liḩsah).

The Wadi Jib joins the Wadi Arus at approximately the point of coordinates 25°53'58.3"N 56°08'28.2"E, forming the head of the Wadi Shah (Wadi Shehah), which gives its name to the entire hydrographic subbasin.

== Toponymy ==
Alternative Names: Wadi Jib, Wādī Jib, wādī jb.

The name of Wadi Jib was recorded in the documentation and maps produced between 1950 and 1960 by the British Arabist, cartographer, military officer, and diplomat Julian F. Walker during the work carried out to establish borders between what was then called Trucial States, later completed by the Ministry of Defence (United Kingdom), on 1:100,000 scale maps published in 1971.

There are also references to Wadi Jib, Musaibat and Lahsa, in the detailed studies and publications by the British anthropologist William Lancaster.

In the political and administrative organization of the Emirate of Ras Al Khaimah, the name of the main wadi is frequently used as an identifying element of the entire territory covered by its drainage basin.

In the case of Wadi Shehah or Wadi Shah, this drainage sub-basin is very large (72.06 km^{2}; 27.82 mi^{2}), comprising numerous towns, villages and farms widely scattered throughout its valleys and mountains. Naturally, it also includes all the ravines and tributaries of the main wadi.

The same denomination is also used for postal purposes.

For this reason, the mistake of considering that this is the only name that corresponds to all the different wadis, and even to some population centers in this region, is widespread, frequently ignoring the true name of each of these places.

This has contributed to the fact that Wadi Jib has also been incorrectly referred to as Wadi Shehah or Wadi Shah on a few occasions.

== Population ==
The geographical area of Wadi Jib was populated historically by the semi nomadic tribe Shihuh, sections of Bani Hadiyah (Arabic: بني هدية) and Bani Shatair (Arabic: بني شطير), who occupied, among other territories, the tribal areas of Bani Idaid and of Bani Bakhit, respectively.

== Gallery ==
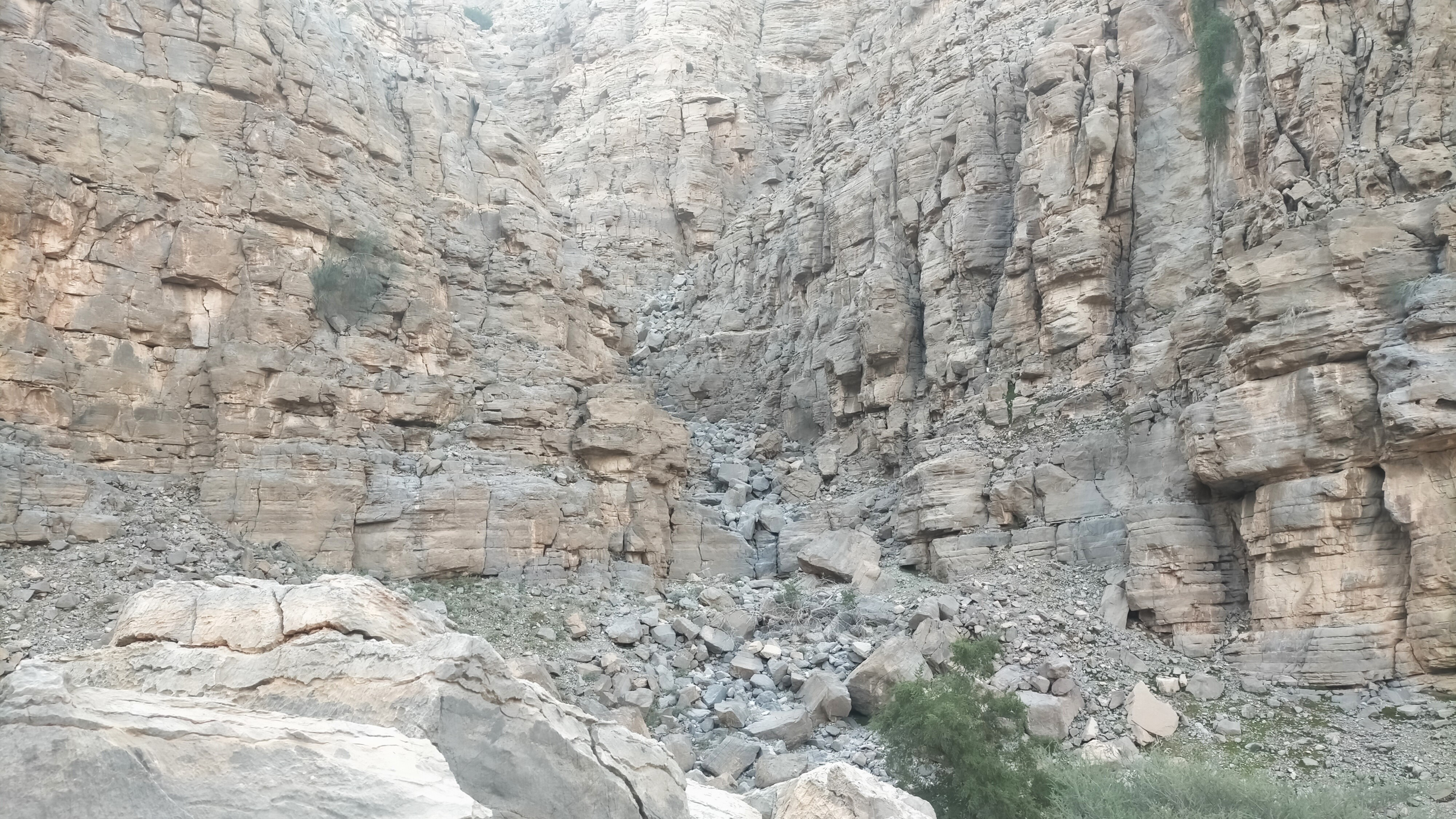
Wadi Jib, shortly before the village of Lahsa. View of a side ravine

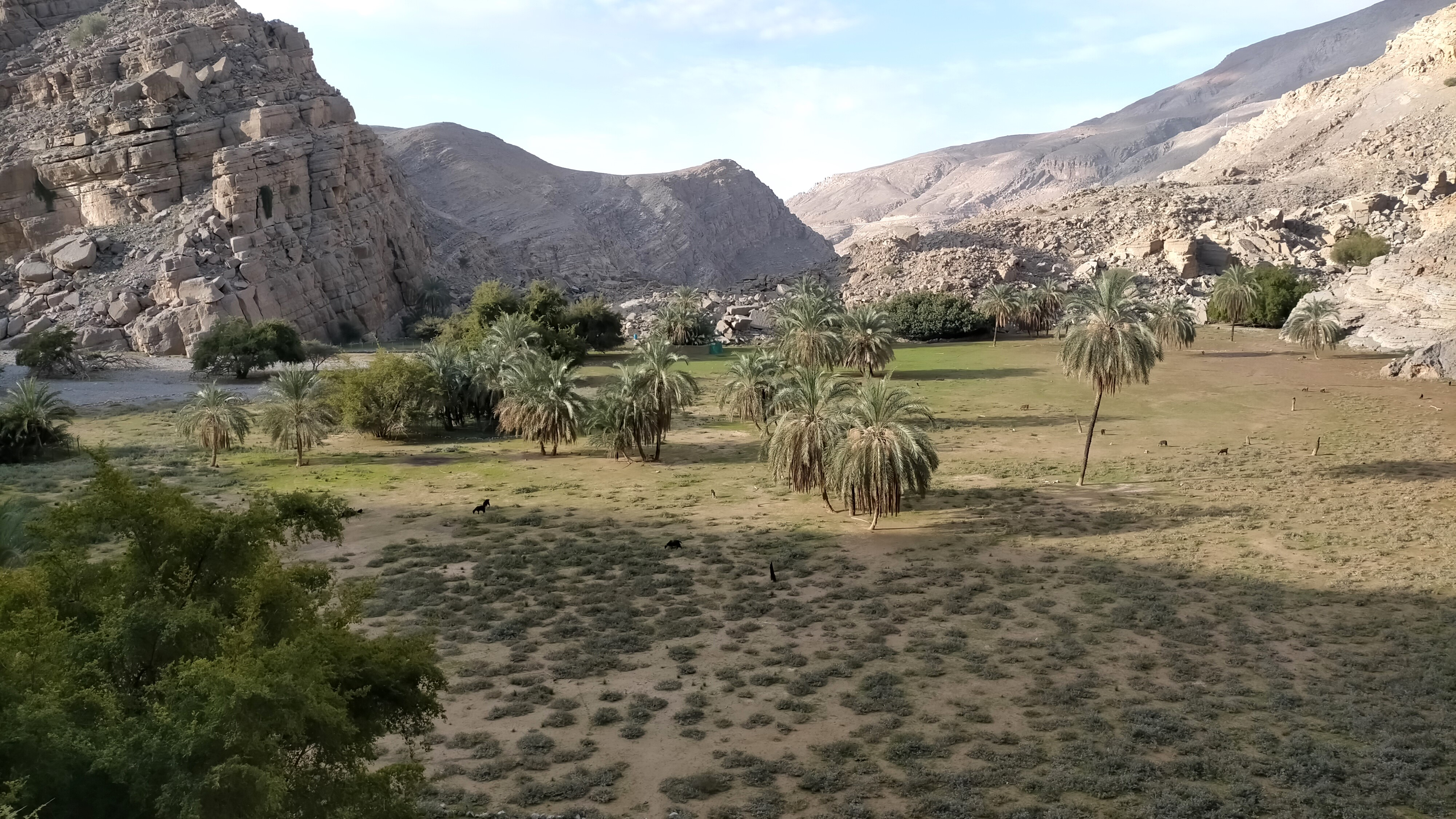
The ravines of Wadi Jib, located to the east and northeast, form a large bend known to some tourists as the Hidden Oasis

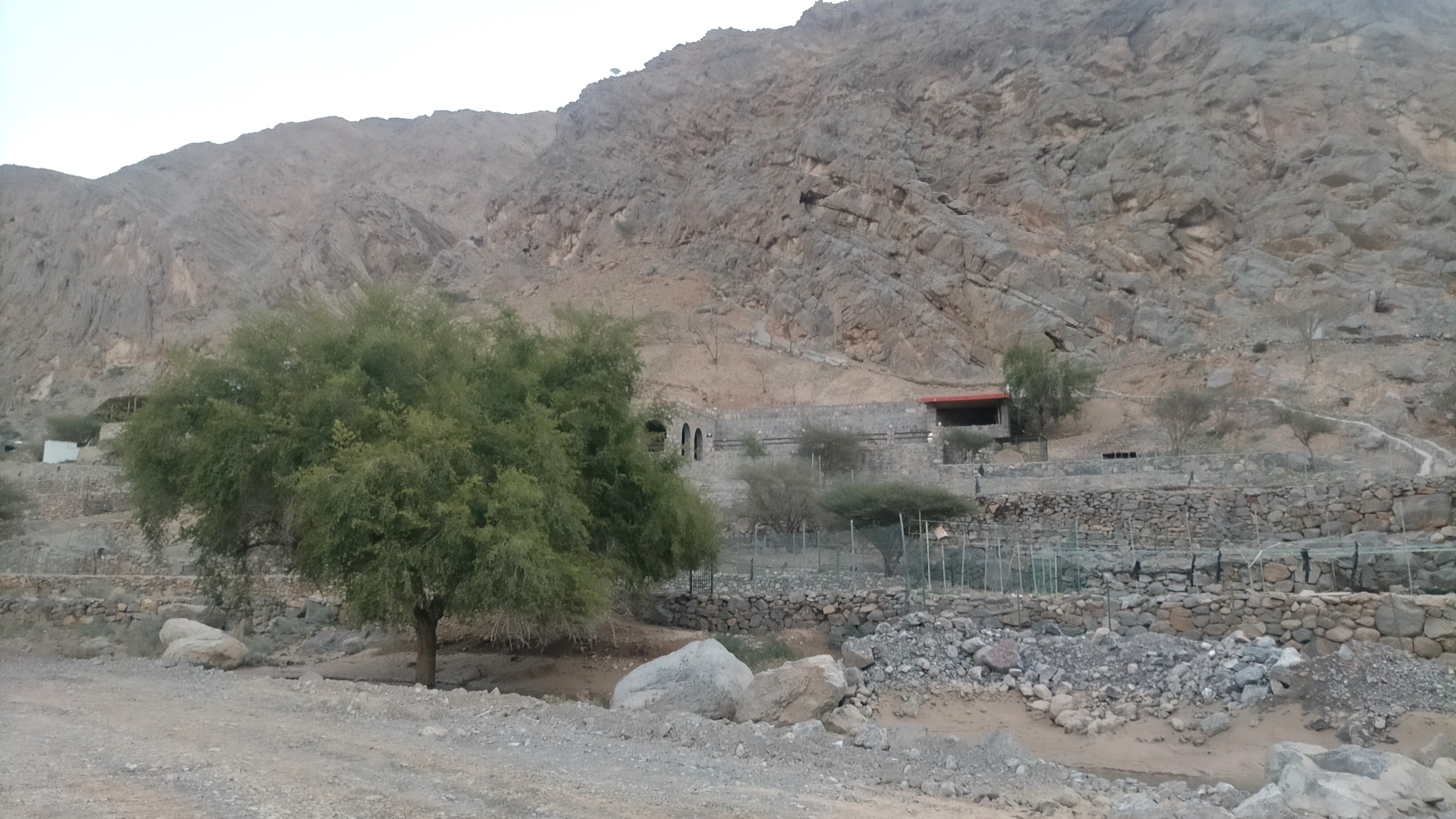
Lahsa Village. On the banks of Wadi Jib, a tributary of Wadi Shah from its confluence with Wadi Arus

== See also ==
- List of wadis of the United Arab Emirates
