= Kathleen Kenyon =

British archaeologist (1906–1978)

Dame Kathleen Kenyon DBE FBA FSA
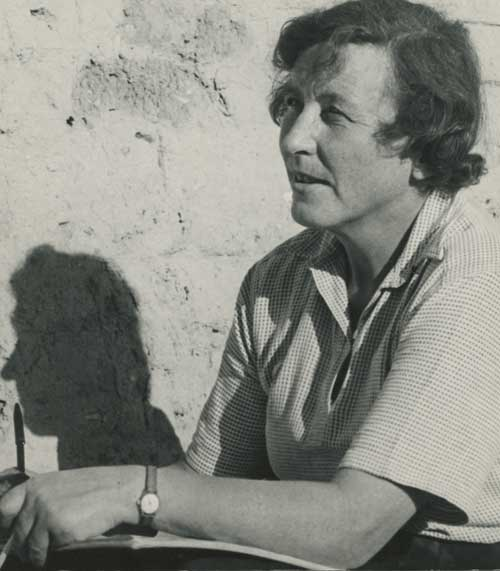
- Born: Kathleen Mary Kenyon; 5 January 1906; London, England, United Kingdom
- Died: 24 August 1978 (aged 72); Wrexham, Wales, United Kingdom
- Known for: Excavation of Tell es-Sultan (Jericho); Excavation of Jewry Wall; Wheeler–Kenyon method

Academic background
- Education: St Paul's Girls' School
- Alma mater: Somerville College, Oxford

Academic work
- Discipline: Archaeology
- Sub-discipline: Neolithic; Ancient Near East; Archaeological theory
- Institutions: Institute of Archaeology; St Hugh's College, Oxford

Dame Kathleen Mary Kenyon (5 January 1906 – 24 August 1978) was a British archaeologist of Neolithic culture in the Fertile Crescent. She led excavations of Tell es-Sultan, the site of ancient Jericho, from 1952 to 1958, and has been called one of the most influential archaeologists of the 20th century. She was Principal of St Hugh's College, Oxford, from 1962 to 1973, having undertaken her own studies at Somerville College, Oxford.

== Biography ==
Kathleen Kenyon was born in London, England, in 1906. She was the eldest daughter of Sir Frederic Kenyon, biblical scholar and later director of the British Museum. Her grandfather was lawyer and Fellow of All Souls College, John Robert Kenyon, and her great-great-grandfather was the politician and lawyer Lloyd Kenyon, 1st Baron Kenyon. She grew up in Bloomsbury, in a house attached to the British Museum, with her mother, Amy Kenyon, and sister Nora Kenyon. Known for being hard-headed and stubborn, Kathleen grew up as a tomboy, fishing, climbing trees and playing a variety of sports.

Determined that she and her sister should be well educated, Kathleen's father encouraged wide reading and independent study. In later years Kenyon would remark that her father's position at the British Museum was particularly helpful for her education. Kathleen was an excellent student, winning awards at school and particularly excelling in history. She studied first at St Paul's Girls' School, where she was head girl, before winning an Exhibition to read history at Somerville College, Oxford. While at Oxford, Kenyon won a Blue in hockey and became the first female president of the Oxford University Archaeological Society. She graduated in 1928 with a third class degree and began a career in archaeology the following year.

Although working on several important sites across Europe, it was her excavations in Tell es-Sultan (Jericho) in the 1950s that established her as one of the foremost archaeologists in the field. In 1962, Kenyon was made Principal of St Hugh's College, Oxford. She retired in 1973 to Erbistock and was appointed a DBE. Kenyon never married. From 1974, Kenyon was the honorary vice president of the Chester Archaeological Society.

== Archaeological career ==
A career in archaeology was first suggested to Kathleen by Margery Fry, librarian at Somerville College. After graduation Kenyon's first field experience was as a photographer for the pioneering excavations at Great Zimbabwe in 1929, led by Gertrude Caton Thompson.

Returning to England, Kenyon joined the archaeologist couple Tessa Wheeler and her husband Mortimer Wheeler on their excavation of the Romano-British settlement of Verulamium (St Albans), 20 miles North of London. Working there each summer between 1930 and 1935, Kenyon learned from Mortimer Wheeler the discipline of meticulously controlled and recorded stratigraphic excavation.

In the years 1931 to 1934, Kenyon worked simultaneously at Samaria, then under the administration of the British Mandate for Palestine, with John and Grace Crowfoot. There she cut a stratigraphic trench across the summit of the mound and down the Northern and Southern slopes, exposing the Iron II to the Roman period stratigraphic sequence of the site. In addition to providing crucial dating material for the Iron Age stratigraphy of Palestine, she obtained key stratified data for the study of late Hellenistic and early Roman eastern terra sigilata wares. In 1957, Kenyon introduced categories A, B, C, to classify eastern sigillata but without determining the exact place of manufacture. In 1934, Kenyon was closely associated with the Wheelers in the foundation of the Institute of Archaeology of University College London.

In the years leading up to the Second World War work in the Middle East became increasingly difficult, so, from 1936 to 1939, she carried out important excavations at the Jewry Wall in Leicester. The excavations were published in February 1937 in the Illustrated London News with pioneering reconstruction drawings by the artist Alan Sorrell whom she had happened to notice sketching her dig. Kenyon initially thought the overall Jewry Wall site was that of the town forum. Although she modified her views when she uncovered the remains of the baths, she continued to believe that the area had originally been laid out as the forum, with the Jewry Wall the west wall of the basilica, but argued that in a second phase of building the site had been converted to public baths. In a series of excavations undertaken between 1961 and 1972, the true remains of the forum were identified further east. The Jewry Wall was then identified as the wall of the palaestra (gymnasium) of the baths complex.

=== Digging Jericho ===
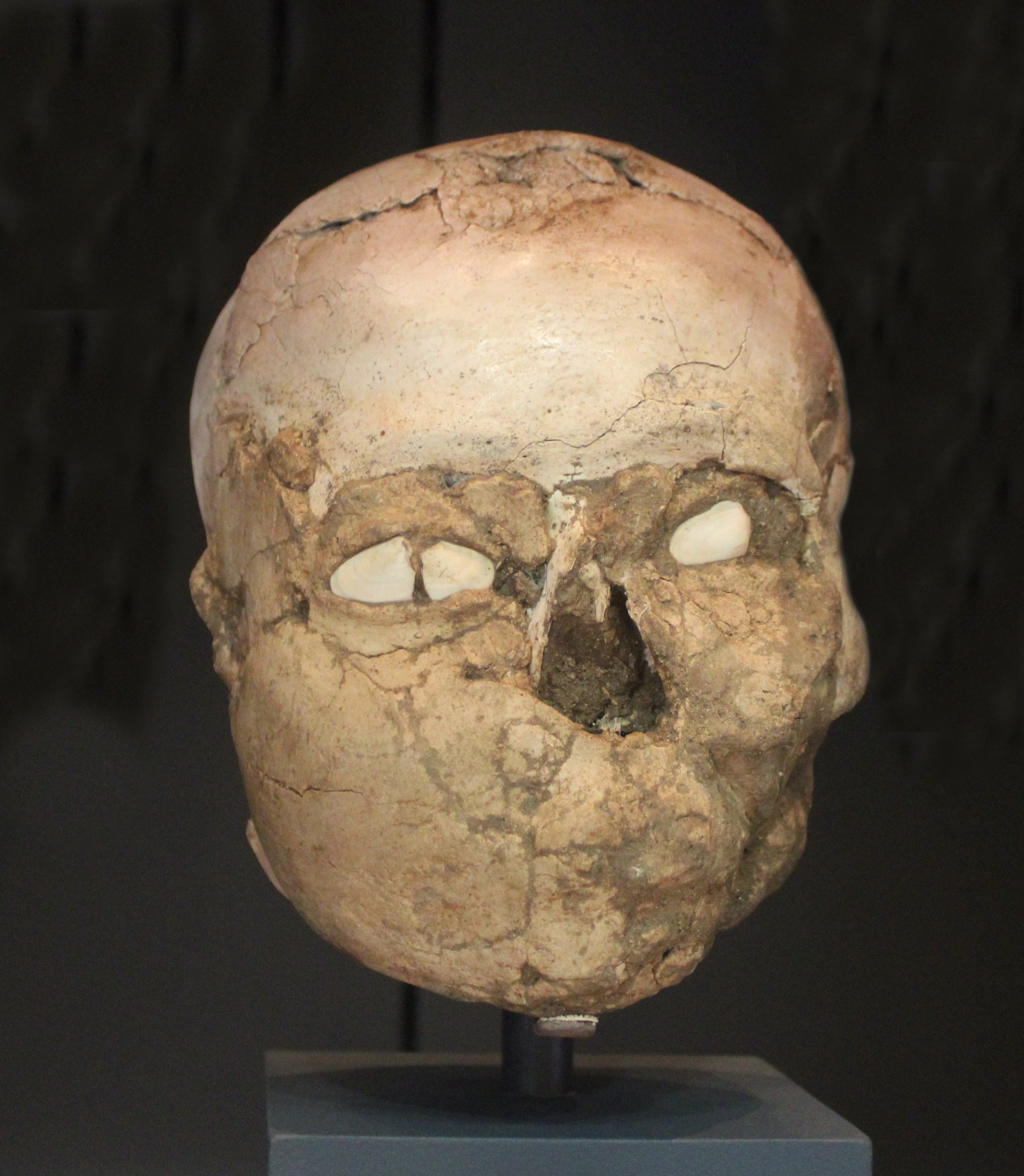
Plastered skull found in Jericho (Tell es-Sultan), Pre-Pottery Neolithic B, c. 7200 BC. BM 12741-42. This skull had the lower jaw removed, and the face modelled from lime plaster, with shells placed in eye sockets.

During the Second World War, Kenyon served as Divisional Commander of the British Red Cross in Hammersmith, London, and later as acting director and secretary of the Institute of Archaeology of the University of London.

After the war, she excavated in Southwark, at The Wrekin, Shropshire, and elsewhere in Britain, as well as at Sabratha, a Roman city in Libya. As a member of the Council of the British School of Archaeology in Jerusalem (BSAJ), Kenyon was involved in the efforts to reopen the School after the hiatus of the Second World War. In January 1951 she travelled to Transjordan and undertook excavations in the West Bank at Jericho (Tell es-Sultan) on behalf of the BSAJ. The initial findings were first viewed by the public in the Dome of Discovery at the Festival of Britain 1951 with a reconstruction drawing by Alan Sorrell. Her work at Jericho, from 1952 until 1958, made her world-famous and established a lasting legacy in the archaeological methodology of the Levant. Ground-breaking discoveries concerning the Neolithic cultures of the Levant were made in this ancient settlement. Her excavation of the Early Bronze Age walled city and the external cemeteries of the end of the Early Bronze Age, together with her analysis of the stratified pottery of these periods established her as the leading authority on that period. Kenyon focused her attention on the absence of certain Cypriot pottery at City IV, arguing for an older destruction date than that of her predecessors. Jericho was recognised as the oldest continuously occupied settlement in history because of her discoveries. At the same time she also completed the publication of the excavations at Samaria. Her volume, Samaria Sebaste III: The Objects, appeared in 1957. Having completed her excavations at Tell es-Sultan in 1958, Kenyon excavated in Jerusalem from 1961 to 1967, concentrating on the 'City of David' to the immediate south of the Temple Mount.

Although Kenyon had no doubt the sites she excavated were linked to the Old Testament narrative, she nevertheless drew attention to inconsistencies, concluding that Solomon's "stables" at Megiddo were totally impractical for holding horses (1978:72), and that Jericho fell long before Joshua's arrival (1978:35). Consequently, Kenyon's work has been cited to support the minimalist school of Biblical archaeology.

=== Legacy ===
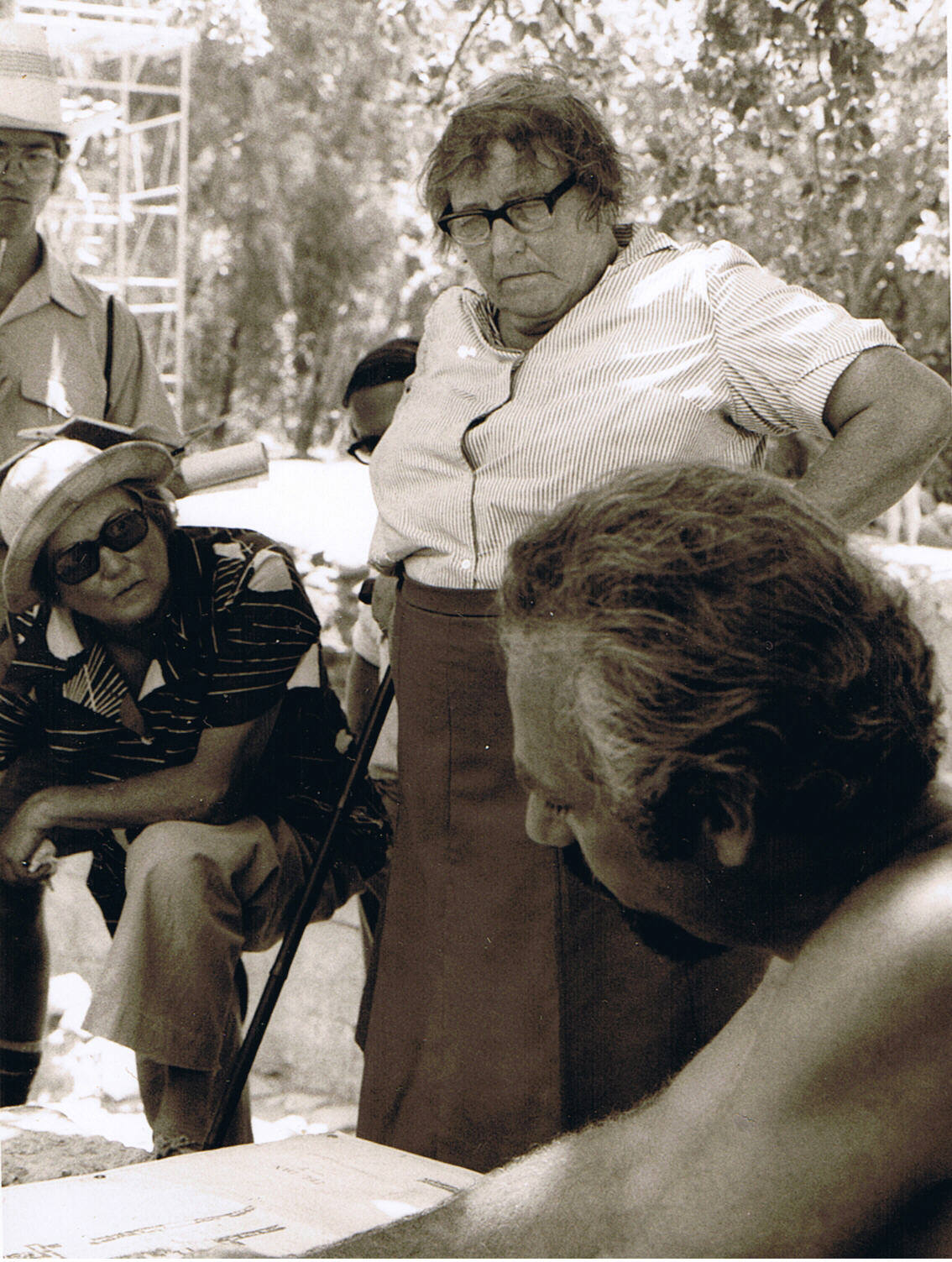
Kenyon and Vassilios Tzaferis at an excavation in 1977

Kenyon's legacy in the field of excavation technique and ceramic methodology is attested to by Larry G. Herr, one of the directors of the Madaba Plains Project. He attributes to her directly the first of the key events (after the advances made by William Foxwell Albright at Tell Beit Mirsim in the 1920s) that brought about our modern understanding of pottery in the southern Levant:

"The first event was the refinement of stratigraphic techniques that Kathleen Kenyon's dig at Jericho catalyzed. The strict separation of earth layers, or archaeological sediments, also allowed the strict separation of ceramic assemblages".

Herr detects Kenyon's powerful indirect influence in the second event that promoted advance within ceramic methodology, namely:

"the importation of Kenyon's digging techniques by Larry Toombs and Joe Callaway to Ernest Wright's project at Balata. Here, they combined Wright's interest in ceramic typology in the best Albright tradition with Kenyon's methods of excavation, which allowed the isolation of clear, stratigraphically determined pottery assemblages".

Herr summarises the somewhat mixed nature of Kenyon's legacy: for all the positive advances, there were also shortcomings:

"Kenyon... did not capitalize fully on (the) implication of her stratigraphic techniques by producing final publications promptly. Indeed her method of digging, which most of us have subsequently adopted, causes a proliferation of loci that excavators often have difficulty keeping straight long enough to produce coherent published stratigraphic syntheses. Moreover, her insistence that excavation proceed in narrow trenches denies us, when we use the Jericho reports, the confidence that her loci, and the pottery assemblages that go with them, represent understandable human activity patterns over coherently connected living areas. The individual layers, insufficiently exposed horizontally, simply cannot be interpreted credibly in terms of function. This further makes publication difficult, both to produce and to use".

From 1948 to 1962, she lectured in Levantine archaeology at the Institute of Archaeology, University College London. Kenyon's teaching complemented her excavations at Jericho and Jerusalem. In 1962, she was appointed Principal of St Hugh's College, Oxford.

== Awards and commemoration ==
In the 1973 New Year Honours, following her retirement from Oxford, she was appointed a Dame Commander of the Order of the British Empire (DBE) "for services to archaeology"; she had received the CBE in the 1954 New Year Honours. She was an elected Fellow of the British Academy (FBA) and of the Society of Antiquaries of London (FSA). She was made a Grand Officer of the Order of Independence by the King of Jordan in 1977.

The British School of Archaeology in Jerusalem, amalgamated within the Council for British Research in the Levant (CBRL) in 1998, was officially renamed the Kenyon Institute on 10 July 2003 in honour of Kathleen Kenyon.

At St Hugh's College, Oxford, the Kenyon Building was constructed between 1964 and 1965 to provide student accommodation; designed by modern architect David Roberts, the building has already been given a heritage listing. In 2025, the University of Leicester announced that their first academic building to be named after a woman would be the Kathleen Kenyon Building, housing its Schools of Archaeology & Ancient History and Museum Studies, which merged on 1 August 2025 to form the School of Heritage & Culture.

== Kenyon collections ==
The Kathleen Kenyon Archaeology Collection, a collection of Kenyon's books and papers from her home office purchased from her estate in 1984, is housed at Baylor University in Waco, Texas. Baylor Libraries do not hold the copyright for these materials.

The finds from her excavations are held in a number of collections, including the British Museum, the British Institute for Libyan and Northern African Studies and the UCL Institute of Archaeology, while the bulk of archive material is located at the Manchester Museum.

== Published works ==
- 1942 The Buildings at Samaria, [Samaria-Sebaste I], London, 1942 (co-authored with Crowfoot, J.W. & Sukenik, E.L.)
- 1948 Excavations at the Jewry Wall Site, [Reports of the Research Committee of the Society of Antiquaries of London 15], Leicester, London: Society of Antiquaries, 1948.
- 1949 Guide to Wroxeter Roman City, London, 1949.
- 1951 "Some Notes on the History of Jericho in the Second Millennium B.C.", PEQ 83 (1951), 101–138.
- 1952 Beginning in Archaeology, London, 1952.
- 1952 "Early Jericho", Antiquity 26 (1952), 116–122.
- 1953 Beginning in Archaeology, second edition, London, 1953.
- 1954 Guide to Ancient Jericho, Jerusalem, 1954.
- 1957 Digging Up Jericho, London, 1957. (also published in Dutch, Hebrew, Italian, Spanish and Swedish editions).
- 1957 The Objects from Samaria, [Samaria-Sebaste III], London, 1957 (co-authored with Crowfoot, J.W. & Crowfoot, G.M.
- 1958 "Some Notes on the Early and Middle Bronze Age Strata of Megiddo", Eretz Israel 5 (1958), pp. 51–60.
- 1959 Excavations at Southwark, [Research Papers of Surrey Archaeological Society 5], 1959.
- 1960 Archaeology in the Holy Land, first edition, London, 1960. (also published in Dutch)
- 1960 Excavations at Jericho – Volume I Tombs Excavated in 1952–4, London 1960.
- 1961 Beginning in Archaeology, revised edition, London, 1961.
- 1965 Archaeology in the Holy Land, second edition, London, 1965.
- 1965 Excavations at Jericho – Volume II Tombs Excavated in 1955–8, London, 1965.
- 1965, "British Archaeology Abroad – Jerusalem", Antiquity 39 (1965), 36–37.
- 1966 Amorites and Canaanites, (Schweich Lectures Series, 1963), London : Published for the British Academy by Oxford University Press, 1966.
- 1966 "Excavations in Jerusalem, 1965", PEQ (1966), 73–88.
- 1967 Jerusalem – Excavating 3000 Years of History, [New Aspects of Antiquity], London, 1967 (also published in a German edition).
- 1969 "Middle and Late Bronze Age Strata at Megiddo", Levant 1 (1969), pp. 25–60.
- 1970 Archaeology in the Holy Land, third edition, 1970 (also published in Dutch, Danish, German, Spanish and Swedish editions).
- 1971 Royal Cities of the Old Testament, London, 1971.
- 1971 "An Essay on Archaeological Technique: the Publication of Results from the Excavation of a Tell", Harvard Theological Review 64 (1971), 271–279.
- 1974 Digging up Jerusalem, London : Benn, 1974.
- 1974 "Tombs of the Intermediate Early Bronze – Middle Bronze Age at Tel 'Ajjul", in Stewart, J.R. (ed.), Tell el Ajjul – the Middle Bronze Age Remains, [App. 2. Studies in Mediterranean Archaeology], Göteborg, 1974, 76–85.
- 1978 The Bible and recent archaeology, London : British Museum Publications Ltd, 1978. (also published in Dutch)

== See also ==
- Archaeology of Israel
- Kursi, Sea of Galilee
- Plastered human skulls
- Pre-Pottery Neolithic A

Academic offices
Preceded by Evelyn Procter	Principal of St Hugh's College, Oxford; 1962 to 1973	Succeeded by Rachel Trickett
