= Musaibat =

Village in the UAE

Musaibat ديرة المسيبات
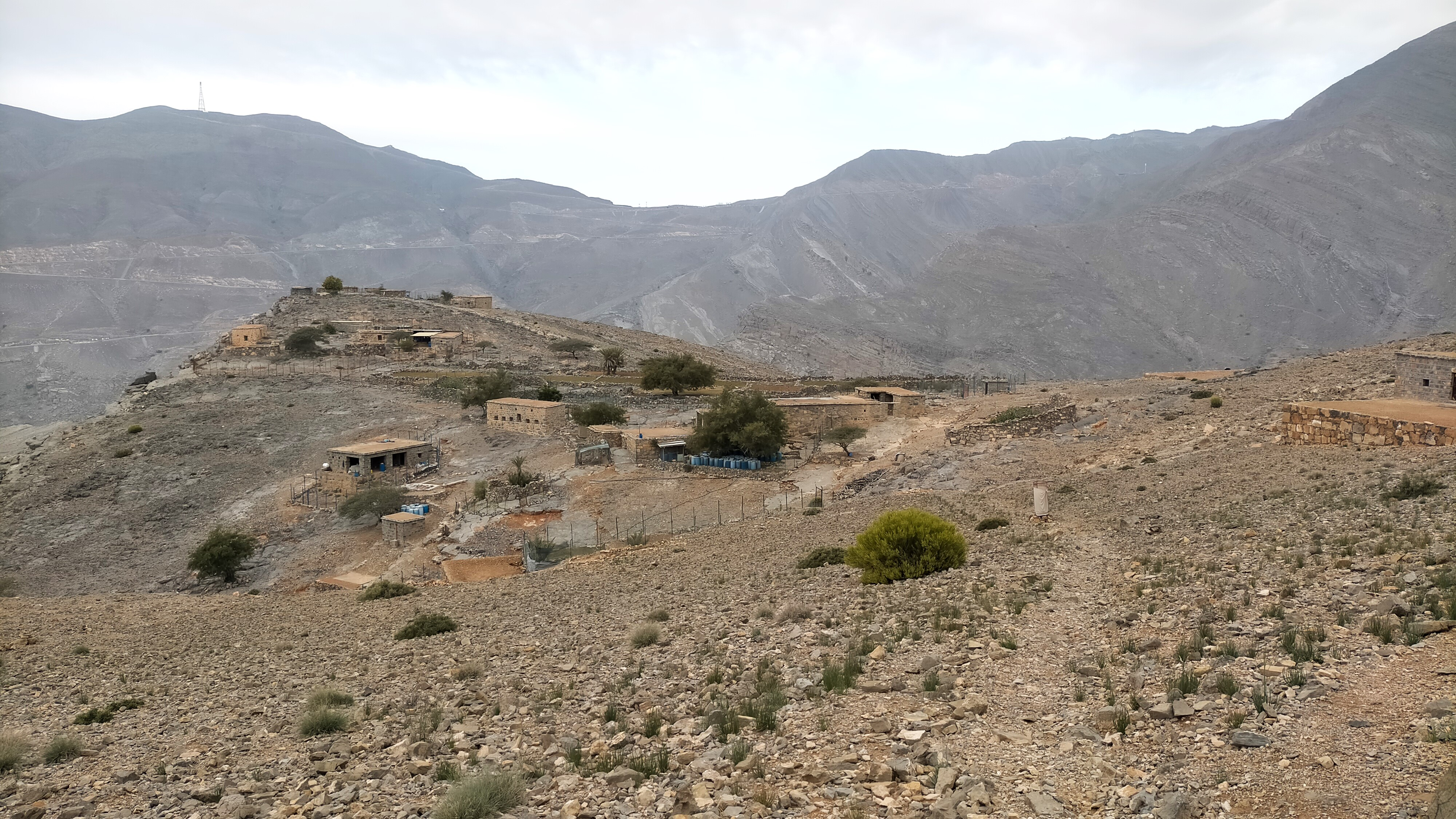
- Musaibat with the Jabal ar Rahrah Ridge in the background

- Location within United Arab Emirates Location within Persian Gulf Location within Middle East Location within West and Central Asia
- Coordinates: 25°54′51″N 56°09′19″E
- Country: United Arab Emirates
- Emirate: Ras Al Khaimah

Area
  - Total: 0.2 km^{2} (0.077 sq mi)
- Elevation: 1,010 m (3,310 ft)

Population (2023)
  - Total: 2
- Time zone: UTC+04:00

Musaibat (Arabic: ديرة المسيبات, romanized: Dīrt l-Msībāt) is a small agricultural and livestock village, located in the northeast of the United Arab Emirates (UAE), in the Hajar Mountains, Emirate of Ras Al Khaimah.

The village has about 20 houses, huts and stone cabins; corrals and terraces supported by dry stone walls, without mortar, which allow water and soil to be retained, destined for pastures and other agricultural uses; pipelines to collect runoff water; sheepfolds; and some other constructions in ruins. At present, it is inhabited only by a single family. Inaccessible by road.

== Geography ==
Musaibat is located to the west and very close to the cliff that geographically delimits that part of the border between United Arab Emirates and Oman, a short distance from Jabal Sal (1,575 m), and surrounded in the middle by the two great wadis of the area: to the north and west the Wadi Jib, and to the south the Wadi Arus, both tributaries of the Wadi Shah.

To the southeast is the semi-abandoned village of Yinainir, and to the west the current village of Lahsa, on the banks of the Wadi Jib, from which Musaibat is accessed following a well-defined donkey trail, which town inhabitants use daily to transfer food and other merchandise, generally on the back of donkeys.

== Population ==
The area of Musaibat was historically inhabited by the Bani Shatair (Arabic: بني شطير) tribe, one of the two main sections of the semi-nomadic tribe Shihuh, occupying, among other territories, the tribal area of Bani Bakhit.

== Toponymy ==
The name of this village was not recorded in the documentation and maps produced between 1950 and 1960 by the British Arabist, cartographer, military officer and diplomat Julian F. Walker during the work he carried out to establish borders between the then called Trucial States, later completed by the Ministry of Defence of the United Kingdom, on 1:100,000 scale maps published in 1971. Nonetheless, historical references to this place, and its name, have been preserved through the meticulous studies and publications carried out by the British anthropologist William Lancaster.

== Gallery ==
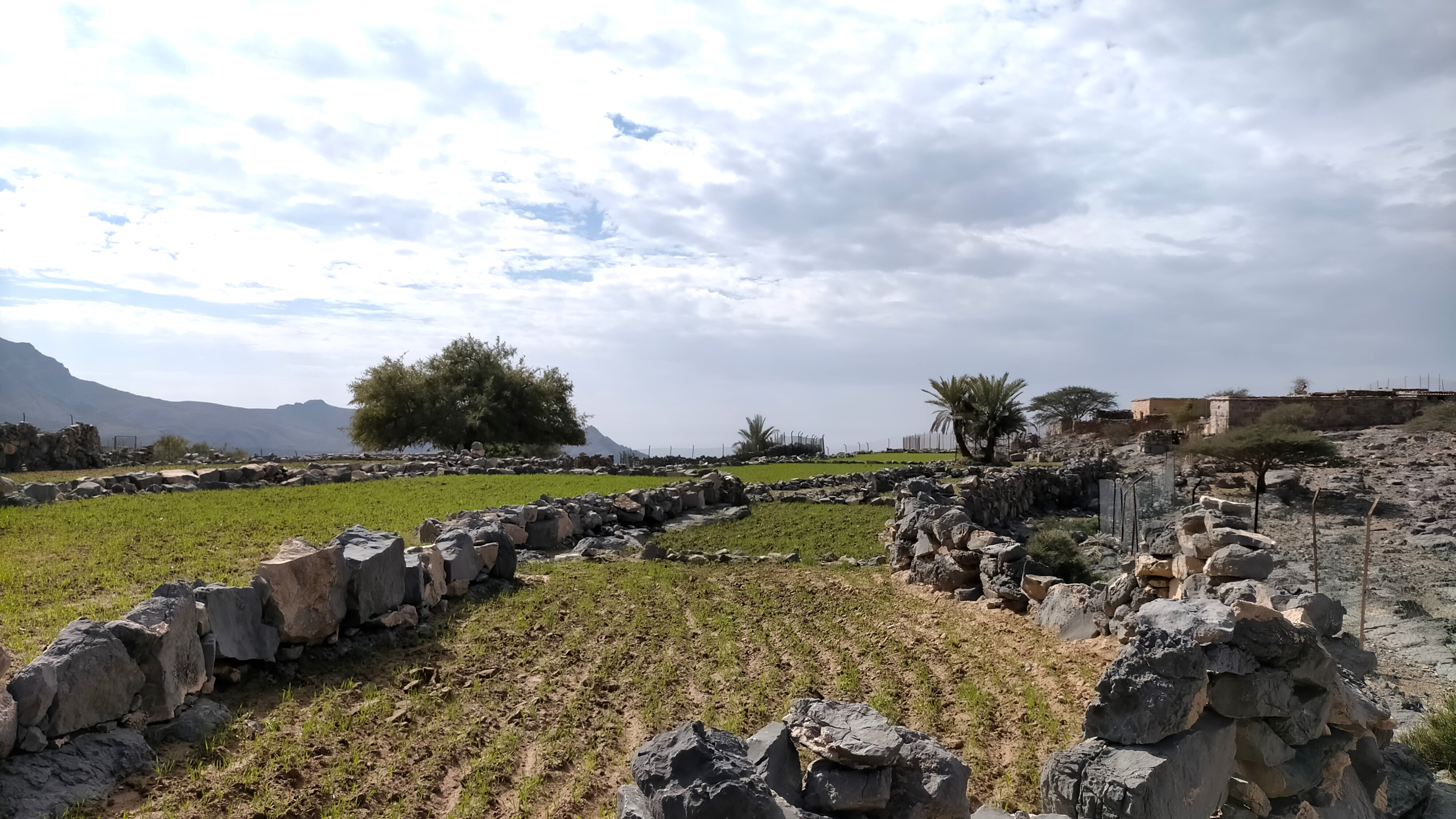
Musaibat, a small agricultural village located between Wadi Jib and Wadi Arus

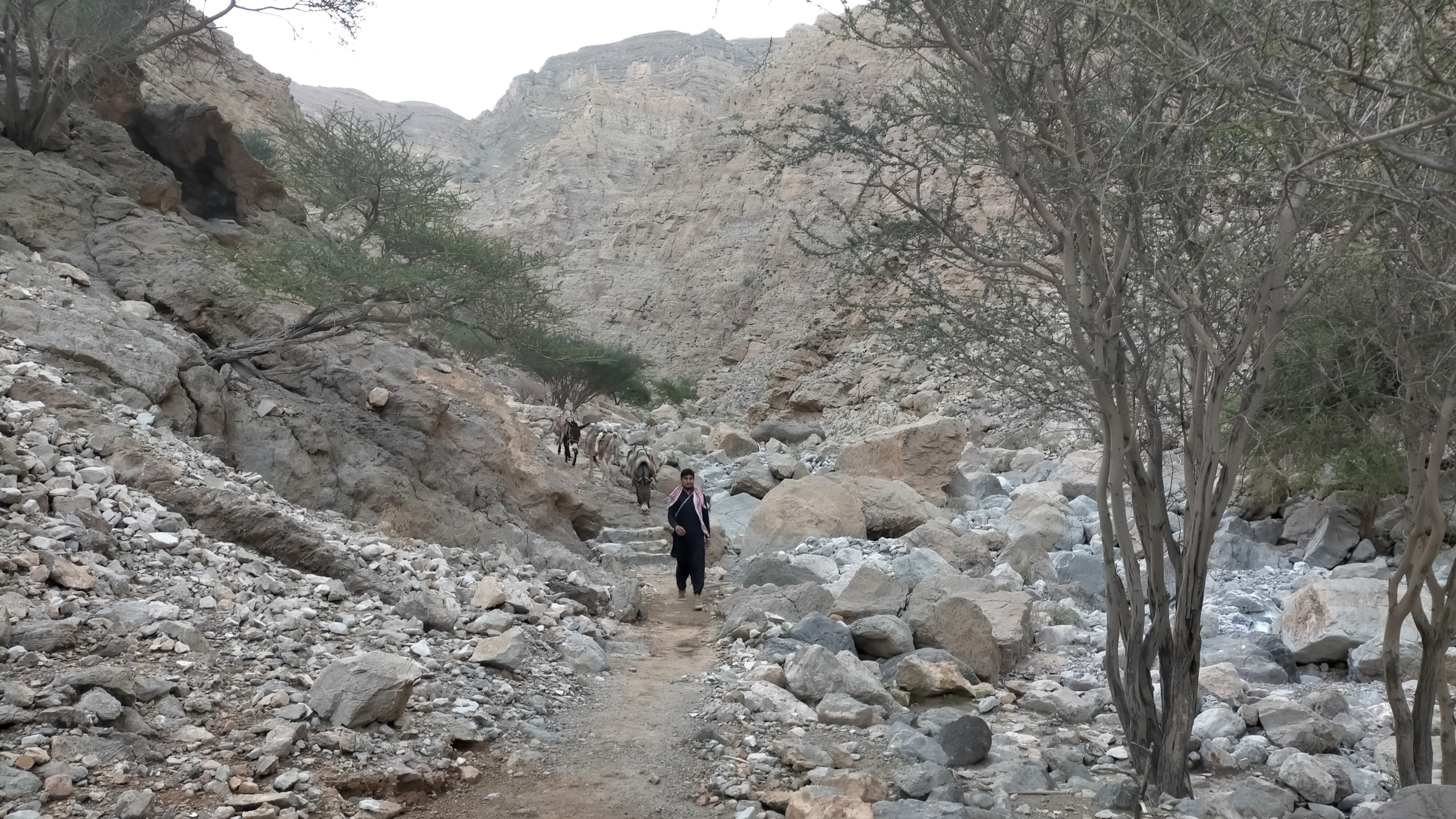
From Musaibat to Lahsa, on the banks of Wadi Jib - Donkey trail through Wadi Lahsa

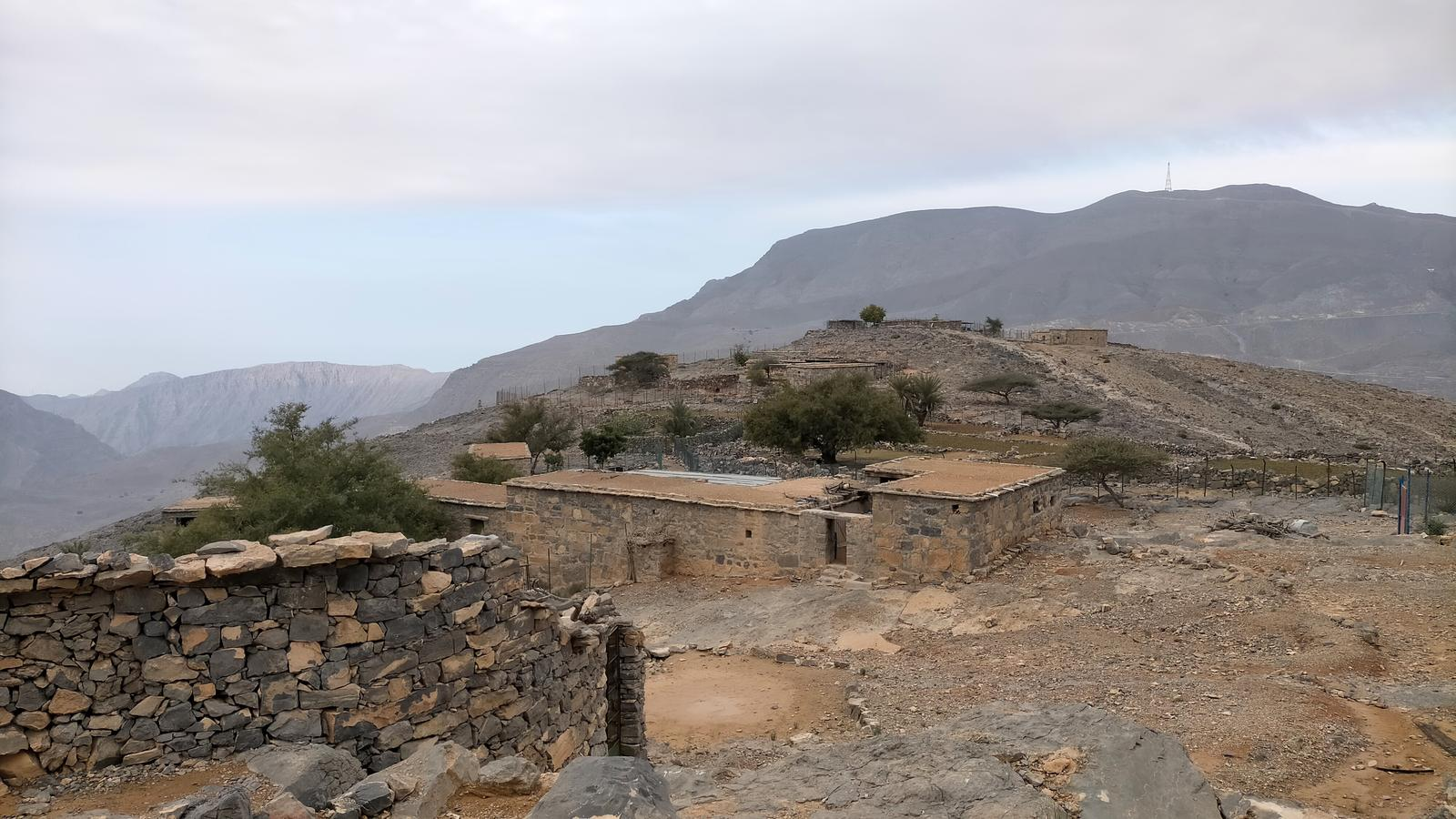
Musaibat, a small agricultural village located between Wadi Jib and Wadi Arus, close to the village of Yinainir

== See also ==
- List of wadis of the United Arab Emirates
- List of mountains in the United Arab Emirates

== Maps and bibliography ==
- Julian Fortay Walker (1958) - Sketch map drawn by Julian Walker for boundary delimitation: Ras Al Khaimah - The National Archives, London, England
- Map of Trucial States, Muscat and Oman - Rams - Scale 1:100 000 - Published by D Survey, Ministry of Defence, United Kingdom (1971) - Edition 3-GSGS - The National Archives, London, England
- Heard-Bey, Frauke (2005). From Trucial States to United Arab Emirates : a society in transition. London: Motivate. ISBN 1860631673. OCLC 64689681.
