= British Institute of Archaeology =

British Institute of Archaeology may refer to:

- British Institute in Ankara, an overseas research institute in Ankara, Turkey, formerly known as the British Institute of Archaeology at Ankara
- British Institute in Amman, an overseas research institute in Amman, Jordan, formerly known as the British Institute at Amman for Archaeology and History
- UCL Institute of Archaeology, a department of University College London
- Institute of Archaeology (Oxford), a department of the University of Oxford
- McDonald Institute for Archaeological Research, a research institute at the University of Cambridge
- Royal Archaeological Institute, a learned society of archaeologists
- Chartered Institute for Archaeologists, a professional body for archaeologists
- British School at Athens, now specialised in Greek Studies and founded in 1886 as an archaeological institute in Athens, Greece

== See also ==
- British Institute (disambiguation)
- Institute of Archaeology (disambiguation)
