= John Donald Wilkinson =

British Anglican priest and bible scholar

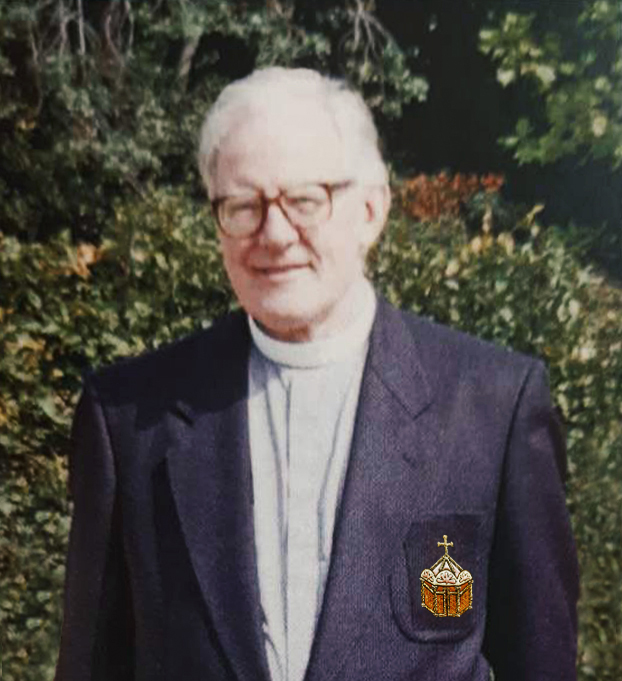
John Donald Wilkinson, London 1996.

John Donald Wilkinson, FSA (28 March 1929, in Wimbledon, England – 13 January 2018, in London) was an Anglican priest and Bible scholar.

He was a Tutor and then dean of St George's College in Jerusalem. He later became director of the British School of Archaeology in Jerusalem (now the Kenyon Institute). Wilkinson provided translations and commentaries on the texts of Christian pilgrims to the Holy Land and in particular Egeria's Travels to the Holy Land (1971), the pilgrimage account of a journey made by a fourth-century Spanish pilgrim Egeria, for which Wilkinson is now mostly remembered.

== Background ==
He was born John Donald Wilkinson in 1929 to The Revd Donald Frederick Wilkinson, Vice Principal of the Bishop's College, Cheshunt and Hilda Mary Wilkinson (née Smyth and herself the daughter of a clergyman). He spent his early childhood near Rye, in Sussex until the age of ten, when he went to Dragon School in Oxford. From 1948 to 1949 Wilkinson was sent to do National Service in Malaya.

== Education and ordination ==
From 1944 to 1948 Wilkinson was educated at Haileybury and the Imperial Service College in Hertfordshire. In 1954 he graduated with two BA degrees in Lit. Hum. and Theology and MA in 1956 from Merton College. In 1982, Wilkinson was awarded a PhD by the Courtauld Institute of Art (University of London) for a thesis which he subsequently developed into a book.

He was trained for ordination in the Church of England at Rippon College Cuddesdon near Oxford, subsequently ordained as deacon (1954) and priest (1957). From 1956 till 1959 he served a three-year curacy at St Dunstan and All Saints, Stepney, London. In 1959 he received the L.Th. Degree (Licentiate of Theology) from the University of Louvain. In 1963 he was awarded an Honorary STD (Doctor of Sacred Theology) degree from the General Theological Seminary in New York.

== Teaching ==
In 1960-61 Wilkinson taught at Ely Theological College and was an assistant lecturer at St Augustine's College, Canterbury. From 1961 to 1963 he was appointed as a tutor at St George's College, Jerusalem.

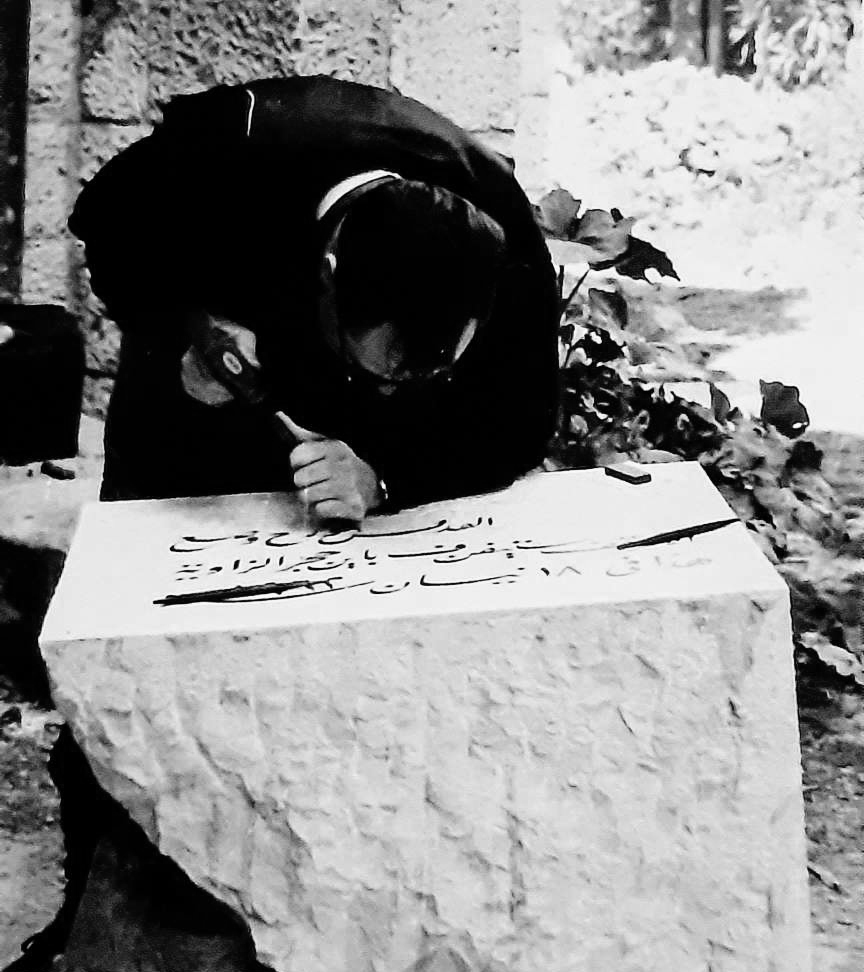
Jerusalem April, 1962. J. Wilkinson engraving the corner stone for St George's Theological College building.

In 1985 he taught at Georgetown University.

== Fellowships and positions held ==
In 1963 Wilkinson succeeded Dewi Morgan as Editorial Secretary of the USPG, and remained as such till 1969.

When he returned to Jerusalem in 1969, he was appointed dean of studies at St George's College. Subsequently, in 1973 Wilkinson became a Canon at St George's Cathedral in Jerusalem. He spent the majority of his career at the British School of Archaeology in Jerusalem (BSAJ), where he was elected to their Council (1976), and from 1979 to 1984 was the director, in succession to Crystal M. Bennet. His principal contribution to the School as Director was to focus the attention of staff on research and publication of its results. He was instrumental in fundraising for the survey of Islamic buildings that allowed the volume on Mamluk buildings to be successfully completed and published under the authorship of Michael H. Burgoyne and Donald S. Richards. Denys Pringle writes that Wilkinson developed BSAJ's library into one of the best working libraries in East Jerusalem for the study of Islamic and Crusader history, archaeology and architecture. Along with the assistant-director Professor Denys Pringle, Professor Jaroslav Folda and Dr Alan Borg, Wilkinson launched a complementary survey project on the church buildings of the Crusader Kingdom of Jerusalem.

In 1984, Wilkinson moved to the Ecumenical Institute for Theological Research at Tantur, near Bethlehem, and then in 1985 to the Center for Byzantine and Mediaeval Studies at Dumbarton Oaks in Washington DC.

In 1975 he became the Bishop's Director of Clergy Training and curate-in-charge of Holy Trinity, Kensington Gore, and All Saints, Ennismore Gardens (now the Russian Orthodox Cathedral), in 1980 he was elected to the fellowship of the Society of Antiquaries of London. Later, in 1991, he became a non-stipendiary minister at St Mary Abbot's Kensington and in 1992-95 priest-in-charge at Christ Church, Kensington.

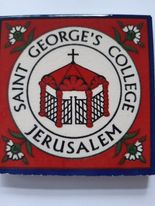
Wilkinson's depiction of the Holy Sepulchre as represented on one of the 7th-century Monza-Bobbio pilgrim flasks is still used today as the logo of St George's College.

== Publishing ==
At the age of twenty-six, he had started the Capivard Publishing Press that continues until the present day. In 1959 he arranged a one-off exhibition on Type and Theology at the Monotype building in Fetter Lane titled 'Print - a Voice of the Church'.

== Work in Georgia ==
In 1992, Wilkinson travelled to Georgia to study representation of the aedicule in the Church of the Holy Sepulchre in Georgian illuminated manuscripts and Georgian pilgrims to the Holy Land. As a result, an agreement was signed between the British and the Georgian Academy of Sciences to translate Georgian travellers' accounts into English. In collaboration with Mzia Ebanoidze, two books were published.

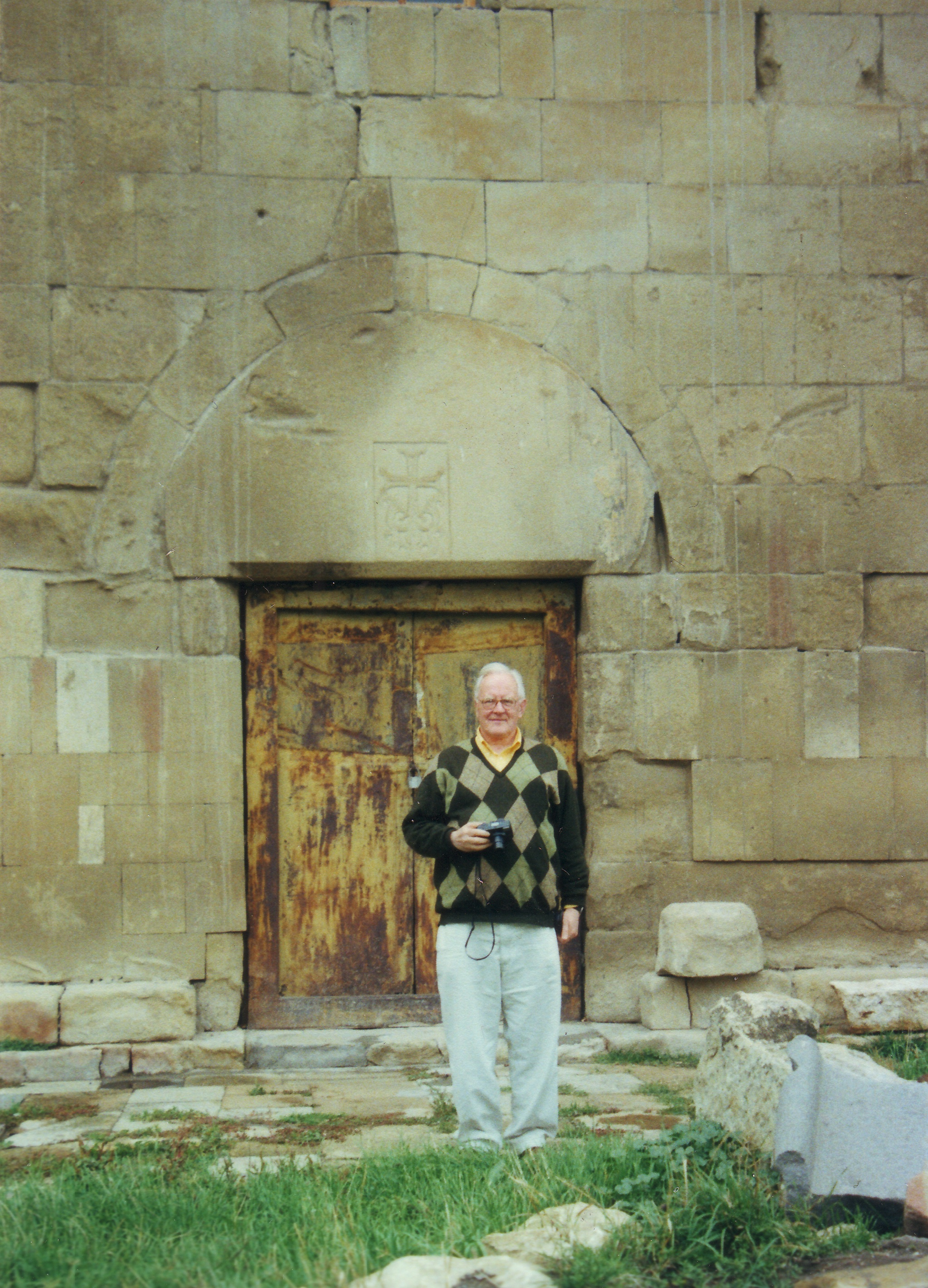
John Wilkinson. Georgia. Samtavisi Cathedral, 2003

In 1995, in association with Mzia Ebanoidze, Wilkinson started charity work in support of Georgian scholars, enabling numerous academic projects to see completion and publication. In 2000, Wilkinson funded Friends of Academic Research in Georgia (FaRiG).

== Selected publications ==
- Egeria's Travels to the Holy Land. SPCK: London, 1971.
- Ancient Jerusalem: Its Water Supply and Population. PEQ 106. 1974, issue 1: 33–51.
- Jerusalem Pilgrims before the Crusades. Aris & Phillips: Warminster, 1977.
- Jerusalem as Jesus Knew It: Archaeology as Evidence. Thames and Hudson: London, 1978.
- Column Capitals in al Haram al Sharif (from 138 A.D. to 1118 A.D.). The Administration of Wakfs and Islamic Affairs, Islamic Museum al-Haram al-Sharif: Jerusalem. Art. Jerusalem. IV, 1987.
- Jerusalem Pilgrimage, 1099–1185. (with Joyce Hill and William Francis Ryan), Hakluyt Society, series 2, vol. 167. 1988, London.
- Timothy Gabashvili: Pilgrimage to Mount Athos, Constantinople and Jerusalem, 1755–1759. Translated and annotated by Mzia Ebanoidze and John Wilkinson. Curzon, 2001, Richmond.
- From Synagogue to Church: The Traditional Design: Its Beginning, its Definition, its End. Routledge Curzon, 2002, London.
- Salisbury Cathedral's Secrets. Laying of Foundations. Capivard Press, 2003, Oxford.
- Petre Konchoshvili: Travels to Jerusalem and Mount Athos. Translated with Mzia Ebanoidze and John Wilkinson. Gorgias Ottoman Travelers, vol. 3. Gorgias Press, 2014, Piscataway IL.
