= Leehurst Swan School =

Location
- Campbell Rd; Salisbury, Wiltshire, SP1 3BQ; England
- Coordinates: 51.0766°N 1.7895°W

Information
- Former name: La Retraite Swan
- School type: Independent School (UK)
- Established: 1914
- Founder: Sisters of La Retraite
- Ofsted: Reports
- Headmaster: Clive Marriott
- Age: 4 to 16
- Website: www.leehurstswan.org.uk

Leehurst Swan School is a co-educational independent day school in Salisbury, Wiltshire, England, for children between the ages of four and sixteen. Its site is near the city centre, about 3/4 mile (1.2 km) northeast of Salisbury Cathedral.

== History ==
The school was founded in 1914 under the name Leehurst Convent School. In 1953 it was taken over by the Sisters of La Retraite and took their name. In 1988, the school became a charitable trust, and in 1996 it merged with The Swan School, an independent preparatory school for boys founded in the 1930s by a Miss Swanton.

The main building, originally a 19th-century family house, occupies a 6-acre (24,000 m^{2}) site. It is surrounded by buildings of various dates, the most recent additions being a performing arts centre and a 12-classroom prep school. The school also has access to a pavilion and playing fields in Salisbury Cathedral Close. All together the school and grounds cover 8 acres.

In 2007 the school changed its name from La Retraite Swan to Leehurst Swan School to signify the end of the association with the Sisters of La Retraite.

== Assessment ==
Leehurst Swan achieved the highest grade of Excellent in all areas at their most recent ISI inspection in 2017.
