= Wadi Arus =

Wadi in the UAE

Wadi Arus Wādī ‘Arūs
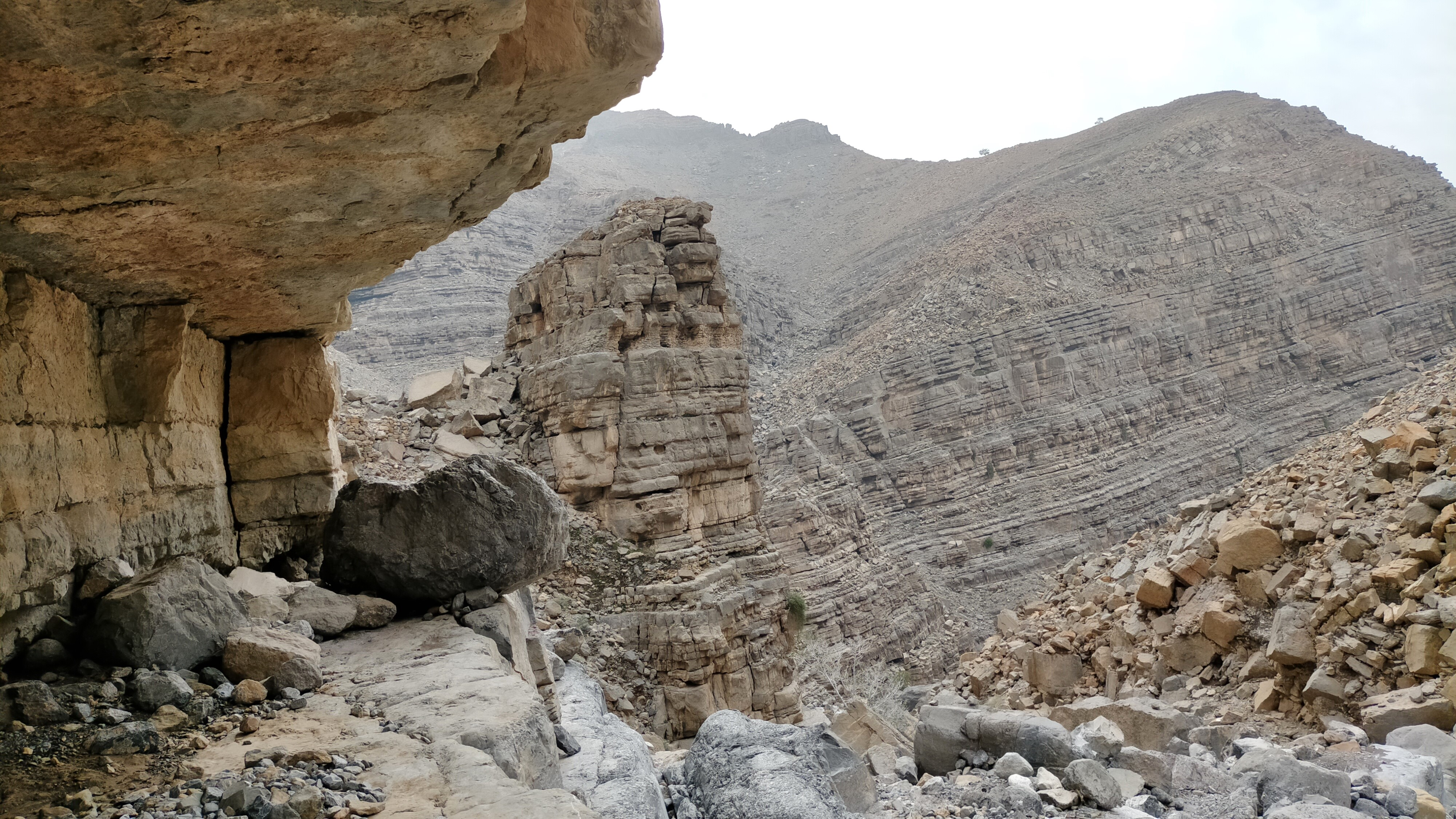
- Wadi Arus - Very rocky and rugged. Tributary of Wadi Shah. Emirate of Ras Al Khaimah (UAE)

- Location within United Arab Emirates Location within Persian Gulf Location within West and Central Asia
- Native name: وادي عروس (Arabic)

Location
- Country: United Arab Emirates
- Emirate: Ras Al Khaimah

Physical characteristics
- Source: Western slope of the border cliff between Oman and UAE, approximately 1 km south of Jabal Sal (1,575 m) Hajar Mountains
  - elevation: 1,400 m (4,600 ft)
- Mouth: Confluence with the Wadi Jib into the Wadi Shah, after the village of Lahsa
  - coordinates: 25°53′58″N 56°08′28″E
  - elevation: 550 m (1,800 ft)
- Length: 6.8 km (4.2 mi)
- Basin size: Wadi Bih: 483 km^{2} (186 mi^{2}); Subbasin Wadi Shah: 72.06 km^{2} (27.82 mi^{2})

Basin features
- River system: Wadi Bih (Subbasin Wadi Shah)

Wadi Arus (Arabic: وادي عروس, romanized: Wādī ‘Arūs) is a valley or dry river, with intermittent flow, which flows almost exclusively during the rainy season, belonging to the river basin of Wadi Bih (subbasin of Wadi Shah), north-east of the United Arab Emirates (UAE), in the Emirate of Ras Al Khaimah.

It is a tributary of the Wadi Shah, from its confluence with the Wadi Jib, and is formed mainly by the ravines and gullies that run along the western slope of the great border cliff between Oman and UAE, from 1 km approximately south of the summit of Jabal Sal (1,575 m); and by those coming from the north and northwest slopes of Jabal Yabanah (1,480 m).

== Course ==
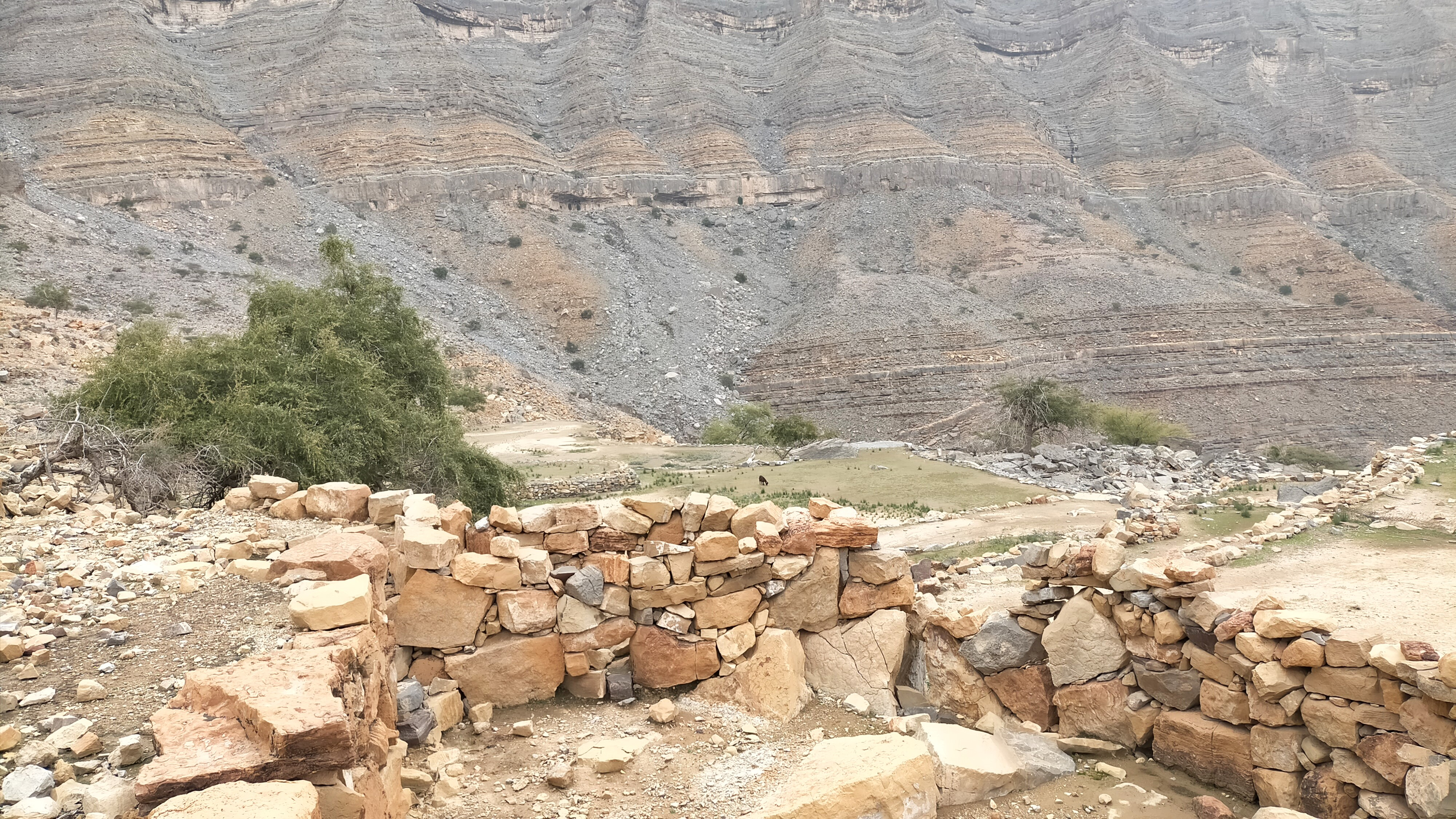
Wadi Arus. View of the ravines flowing from the Oman-UAE border cliff, towards the ancient village of Yinainir

In a first section of its main course, the Wadi Arus flows from north to south, parallel to and very close to the line of large cliffs that delimit the border between Oman and UAE, to the south of Jabal Sal (1,575 m) (Coordinates 25.93251°N, 56.16921°E), receiving the waters of the ravines, gullies, and streams of its western slope, next to the ancient village of Yinainir.

To a lesser extent, this first section also receives water from the small hills located to the south and east of Musaibat, which make up the drainage divide in that area, between those that flow to the north (Wadi Jib), and those that flow to the south (Wadi Arus).

In its central and final sections, which run from east to west, the Wadi Arus receives the waters from the north and northwest slopes of the continued line of border cliffs—including the summit of another important peak of the Emirates: the Jabal Yabanah (1,480 m) (Coordinates 25.87500°N, 56.16000°E) -- which are concentrated in two large tributary ravines to the left.

The bed of the Wadi Arus is covered, in most of its course, by a large amount of rocks and stones detached from its high side walls, due to the erosion caused by the waters and the characteristic processes of physical weathering.

Already in the final section, in which a dam has recently been built to control flooding, it presents a less rugged channel.

The Wadi Arus joins the Wadi Jib at approximately the point of coordinates 25°53'58.3"N 56°08'28.2"E, forming the head of the Wadi Shah (Wadi Shehah), which gives its name to the entire hydrographic sub-basin.

One kilometer to the west of this point, the historic settlement of Shah (Shāh) was settled, of which some of its terraces, corrals and other stone constructions are still preserved, scattered next to a small wadi that also bears his name.

== Toponymy ==
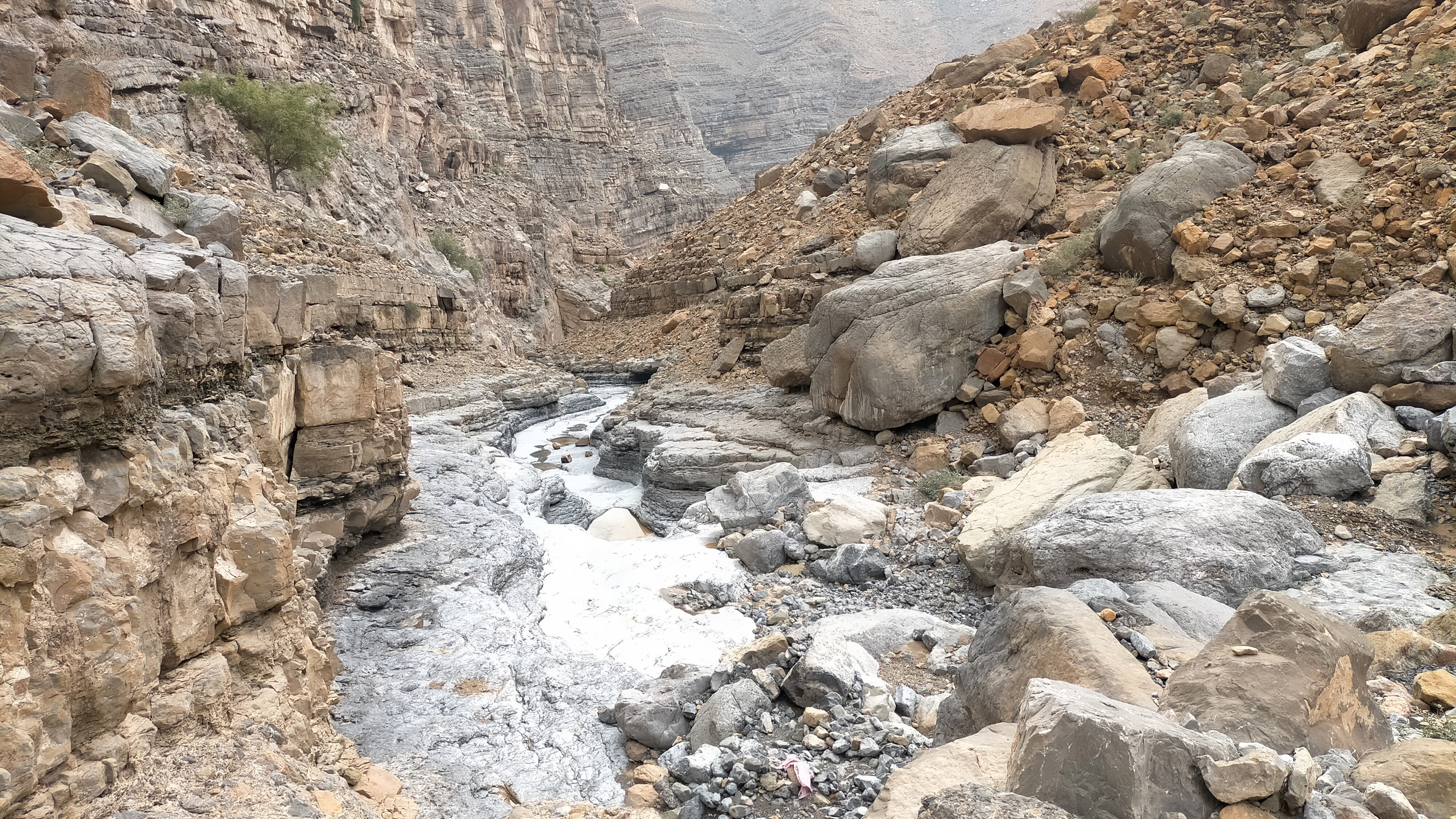
Wadi Arus. Natural pools in its middle course

Alternative Names: Wadi Arus, Wadi `Arus, Wādī ‘Arūs

The name of Wadi Arus was recorded in the documentation and maps produced between 1950 and 1960 by the British Arabist, cartographer, army officer, and diplomat Julian F. Walker, during the work carried out to establish borders between what was then called Trucial States, later completed by the Ministry of Defense (UK), on 1:100,000 scale maps published in 1971.

In the political and administrative organization of the Emirate of Ras Al Khaimah, the name of the main wadi is frequently used as an identifying element of the entire territory covered by its drainage basin.

In the case of Wadi Shehah or Wadi Shah, this drainage sub-basin is very large (72.06 km^{2}), comprising numerous towns, villages and farms widely scattered throughout its valleys and mountains. Naturally, it also includes all the ravines and tributaries of the main wadi.

The same denomination is also used for postal purposes.

For this reason, the mistake of considering that this is the only name that corresponds to all the different wadis, and even to some population centers in this region, is widespread, frequently ignoring the true name of each of these places.

This has contributed to the fact that Wadi Arus has also been incorrectly referred to as Wadi Shehah or Wadi Shah on a few occasions.

Adding to the confusion, new signage has recently been installed on the access route to the Jebel Jais area, referring to the name of Wadi Khammed, which lacks topographical background and historical documentary or cartographic references.

== Population ==
The geographical area of Wadi Arus was populated historically by the semi nomadic tribe Shihuh, sections of Bani Hadiyah (Arabic: بني هدية) and Bani Shatair (Arabic: بني شطير), who occupied, among others territories, the tribal areas of Bani Idaid and of Bani Bakhit, respectively.

== Gallery ==
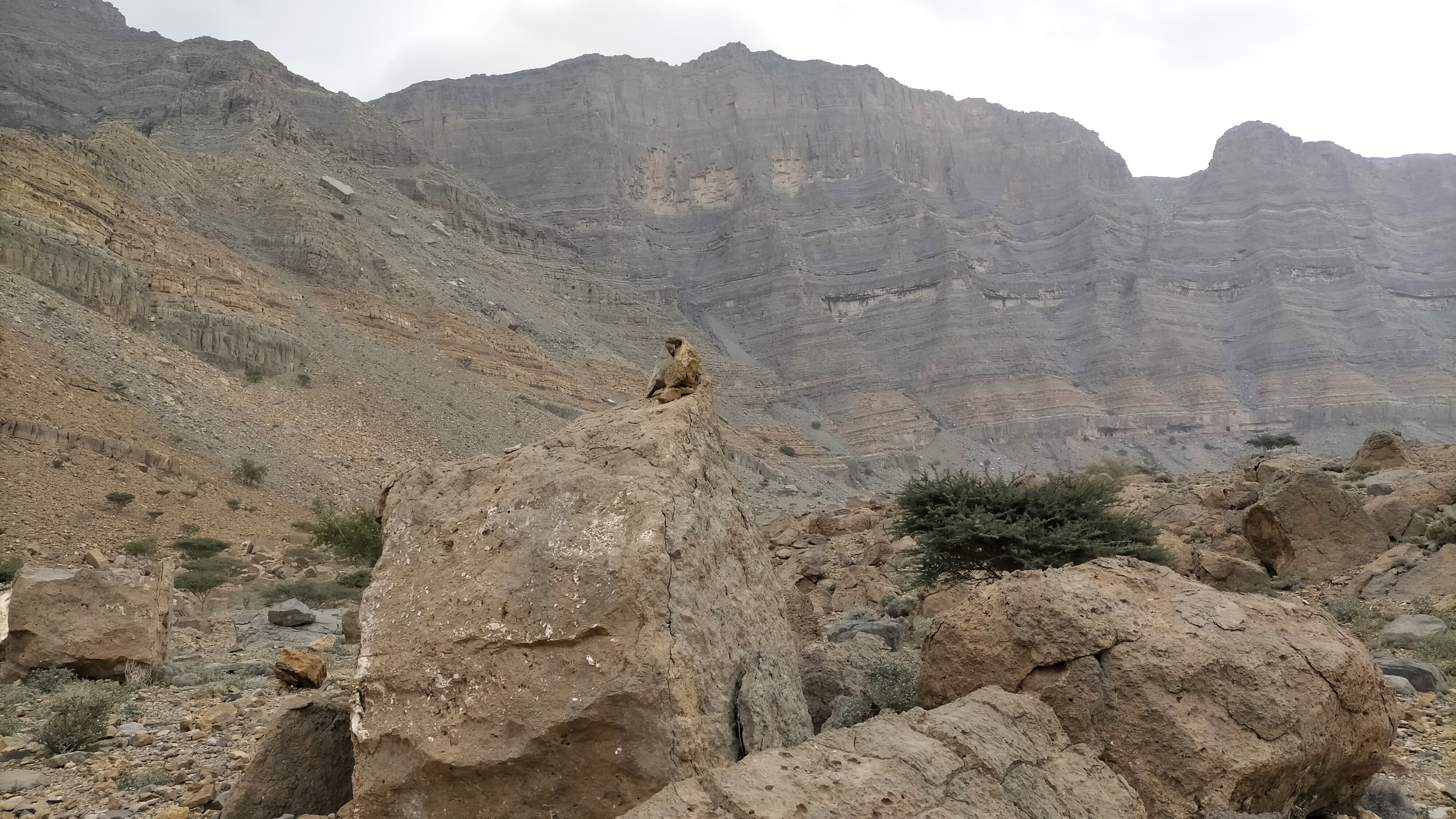
Border cliff view of the Wadi Arus's source

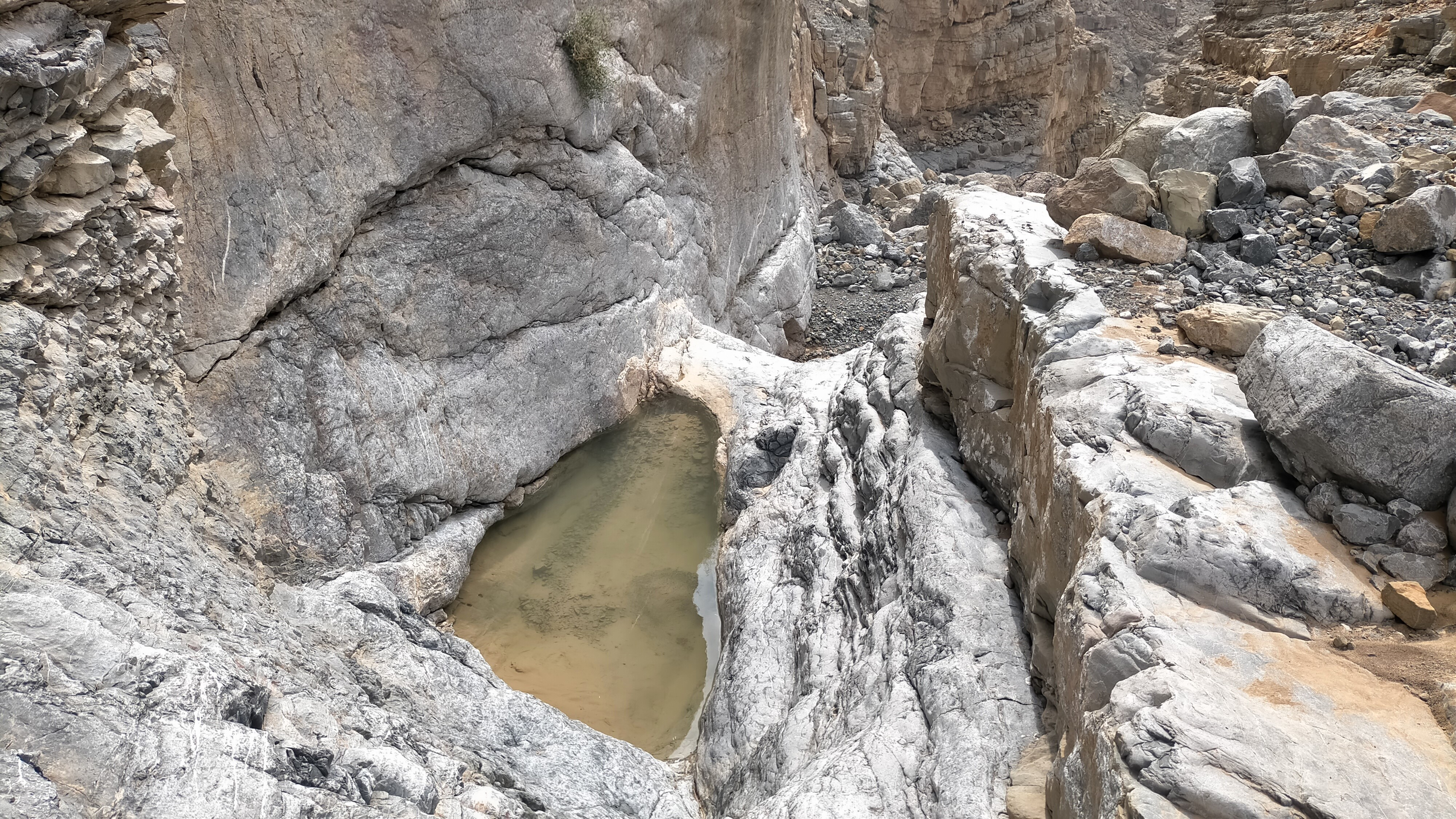
Wadi Arus - Middle course

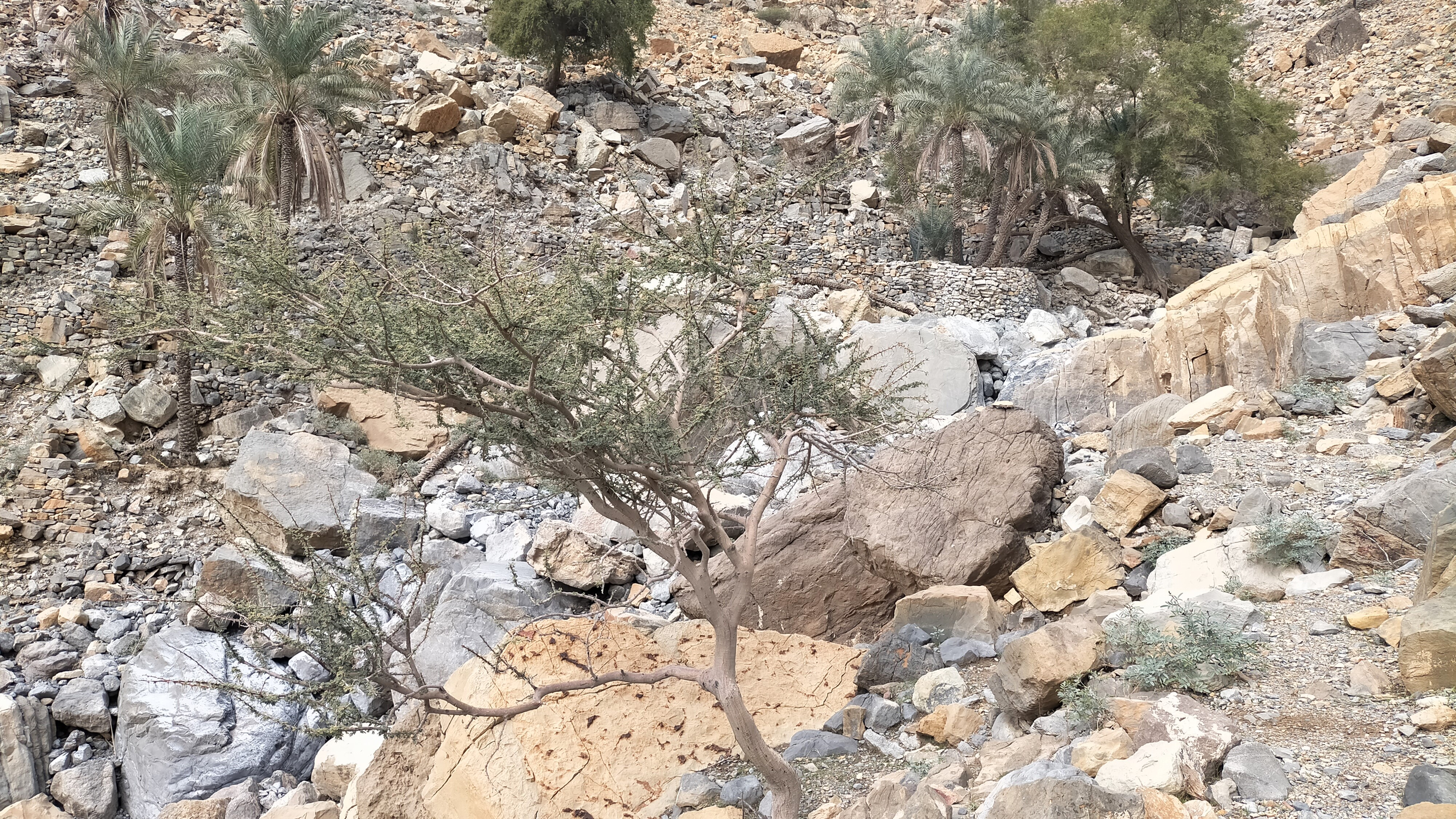
Wadi Arus - Palm trees and terraces at the end of the initial section, which flows from north to south

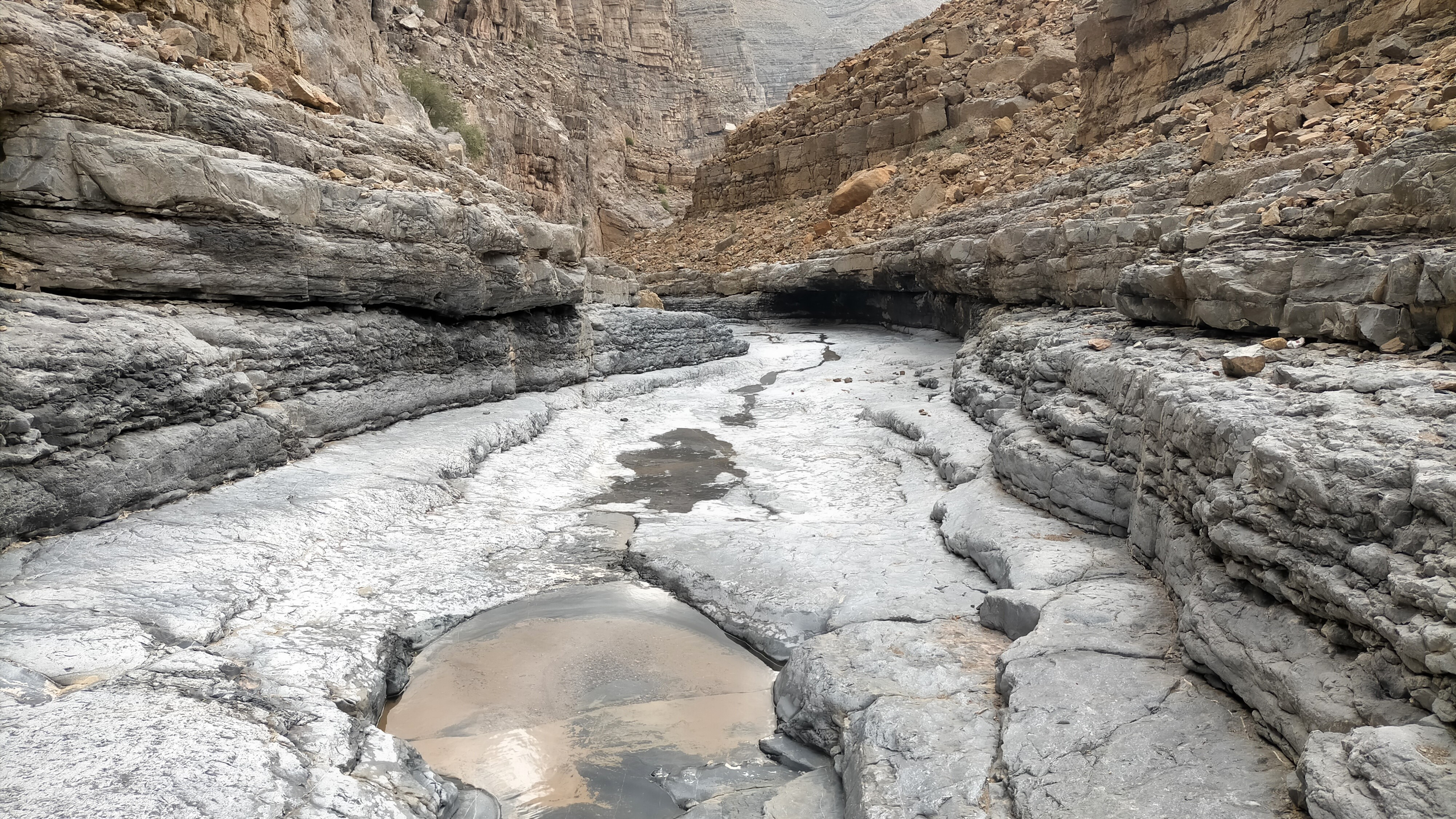
Wadi Arus - Small natural pools in the middle course

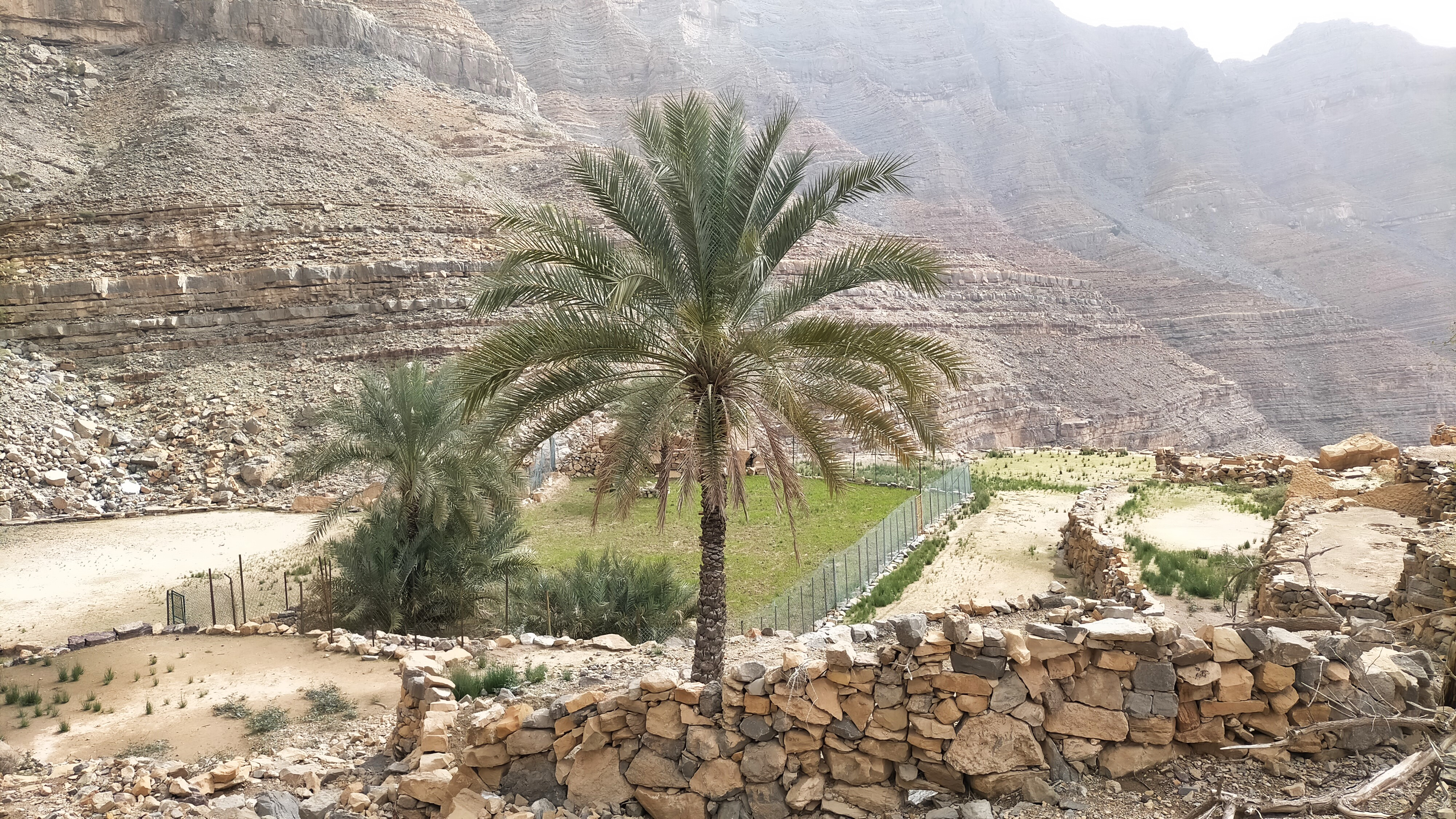
Yinainir - Wadi Arus - Palm trees and terraces in the middle course

== See also ==
- List of wadis of the United Arab Emirates
- List of mountains in the United Arab Emirates
- List of wadis of Oman
- List of mountains in Oman
