= Sisters of La Retraite =

The Sisters of La Retraite or the Congregation of the Retreat is a Roman Catholic congregation founded as early as 1675 in Vannes and Quimper in Brittany by Catherine de Francheville and Claude-Thérèse de Kerméno under the guidance of the Jesuit Vincent Huby.

== History ==
Claude-Thérèse de Kerméno having made a retreat in a convent which accommodated ladies who desired to retire from the world and follow the exercises of St. Ignatius of Loyola, conceived the idea of founding a similar convent at Quimper. Later the sisters took the name of the Dames of La Retraite.

During the French Revolution they were dispersed for refusing to take the oath of allegiance. On 17 July 1794, one of their number, Victoire de St-Luc, was executed by the guillotine. Her death precipitated a flourishing of the congregation, the members consecrated themselves to the Sacred Heart, and in 1805 began again the work of providing retreats for people.

After the religious and administrative authorities in France required the sisters to add the education of youth to their other work, they now have schools in various places in England, France, and Belgium.

== Locations ==
In 1820, two sisters from Quimper opened a house at Redon (Ille-et-Vilaine), which eventually became the Retreat of Angers.

Meantime the mother-house at Quimper in 1808 opened a house at Quimperlé; in 1820, one at Lesneven; in 1847, one at Pontchâteau, and in 1858, one at Brest. The following convents were founded by the Retreat of Angers: in 1820, Redon; in 1844, Saumur (Maine-et-Loire); in 1857, a second house at Angers called l'Oratoire, and in 1893, one at Fontenay-sous-Bois (Seine). In 1880, the sisters went to England and the convent at Clapham Park was founded from Angers. In 1882, a convent was opened at Burnham, in Somerset, from Quimper, and after the union of Quimper and Angers in 1897, another convent was opened at Weston-super-Mare, Somerset, and in 1904, one at Clevedon. In 1898, a house at Mentone was opened, and in 1899 an educational establishment at Brussels.

On 11 May 1966, the Holy See decreed that the three congregations of the retreat: the united Quimper and Angers congregation; the Sisters of La Retraite in Vannes founded by Catherine de Francheville in 1675; and the Congregation of the Retreat of the Sacred Heart in Bruges founded by Mother Marie des Anges in 1875; would be centralised into one institute based in Saint-Germain-en-Laye, and called the Sister of La Retraite.

== See also ==
- La Retraite Roman Catholic Girls' School
- Leehurst Swan School

== Sources ==
- Guerrino Pelliccia e Giancarlo Rocca (curr.), Dizionario degli Istituti di Perfezione (DIP), 10 voll., Edizioni paoline, Milan 1974-2003.
