= Crystal Bennett =

British archaeologist

Crystal-Margaret Bennett OBE FSA
- Born: Crystal-Margaret Rawlings; 20 August 1918; Alderney, Channel Islands
- Died: 12 August 1987 (aged 68); Bruton, Somerset, England

Academic background
- Education: Institute of Archaeology, University of London
- Influences: Kathleen Kenyon

Academic work
- Discipline: Near Eastern archaeologist
- Sub-discipline: Biblical archaeology; Levantine archaeology; Edom; archaeology of Jordan
- Institutions: Kenyon Institute; British Institute in Amman

Crystal-Margaret Bennett OBE FSA (20 August 1918 – 12 August 1987) was a British archaeologist. A student of Kathleen Kenyon, Bennett was a pioneer of archaeological research in Jordan and founded the British Institute at Amman for Archaeology and History.

== Early life and education ==
Crystal-Margaret Rawlings was born to George Rawlings, a soldier, and Elizabeth Rawlings (née Jennings) of Alderney, one of the Channel Islands, on 20 August 1918. She was the third of five children. She attended La Retraite Convent School in Bristol and then Bristol University, where she studied English. At the age of 22 she married draughtsman Philip Roy Bennett (1907–1986), converting from Roman Catholicism to the Church of England. The marriage lasted six years; the couple separated in 1946, a year after the birth of their only child Simon Bennett. Following the divorce, Bennett moved in with her former mother-in-law and raised her son Simon.

In 1954, Bennett enrolled at the Institute of Archaeology in London (now part of University College London) to study for a postgraduate diploma in the Archaeology of the Roman Provinces in the West. She participated in excavations led by Sheppard Frere, and directed two excavations of her own: a Roman villa near Cox Green, Berkshire; and a Romano-British temple near her home in Bruton, Somerset. She then took a second postgraduate diploma in Palestinian Archaeology, which she studied under Kathleen Kenyon.

== Edomite excavations ==
After completing her second postgraduate diploma, Bennett was invited to join Kenyon's final season of excavations at Jericho in 1957 to 1958, and subsequently contributed to the second volume of Kenyon's monograph on the site. She then went on to work with Peter Parr at Petra (1958–1963), and again with Kenyon in Jerusalem (1961–1963).

It was whilst working with Parr at Petra that Bennett first became interested in the Edomites, which was to become the focus of her later career. She conducted excavations at an Edomite site in Petra in 1958, 1960 and 1963. It was here that Bennett also began her reputation for overcoming considerable logistical obstacles: the site was located atop one of Petra's most inaccessible peaks, Umm al-Biyara, and all supplies had to be carried up to the summit by hand or else airlifted in by helicopter. Bennett's work there significantly revised the previously accepted chronology of the Edomites, placing them in the 7th century BCE rather than the 13th. She subsequently excavated the Edomite sites of Tawilan (1968–1970, 1982), near Petra, where Bennett discovered the first cuneiform tablet found in Jordan; Buseirah in southern Jordan (1971–1974, 1980), identified with the biblical Bozrah, the capital of the Edomite kingdom; and a number of mining sites around Wadi Dana and Wadi Faynan.

== British Institute at Amman ==
Bennett was assistant director of the British School of Archaeology in Jerusalem (BSAJ) from 1963 to 1965. The Six Day War of 1967 and Israel's subsequent occupation of the West Bank, meant that Jerusalem was now separated from Bennett's preferred geographical area of Jordan. She served as director of the British School of Archaeology in Jerusalem from 1970 to 1980. She used her own money to set up a second office for the School in Amman, Jordan, in her first year in charge. In 1975, the Jordanian Department of Antiquities invited her to direct a rescue excavation on the Amman Citadel; the excavation lasted three seasons.

Bennett was convinced of a need for a permanent British base in Jordan, and she received funding from the British Academy to found the British Institute at Amman for Archaeology and History (BIAAH) in 1978. She jointly served as director of the BSAJ and the BIAAH for the next two years, before stepping down as director of the BSAJ in 1980. In the 1970 Queen's Birthday Honours, she was appointed Officer of the Order of the British Empire (OBE) "for services to archaeology in Jordan and to Anglo-Jordanian relations". She continued to serve as director of the BIAAH until she retired in 1983 to Cyprus.

Bennett died of liver disease on 12 August 1987 at her home, Tolbury House, in Bruton, Somerset, England. She is buried in the village.

== Selected works ==
- Bennett, Crystal-M. (January 1984). "Excavations at Tawilan in Southern Jordan, 1982". Levant. 16 (1). Council for British Research in the Levant: 1–23. doi:10.1179/007589184790586300.
- Bennett, C.-M.; Bienkowski, Piotr (1995). Excavations at Tawilan in Southern Jordan. Oxford: Oxford University Press. ISBN 9780197270073.
