= Institute of Archaeology =

Institute of Archaeology may refer to:

- British Institute of Archaeology (disambiguation)
- Cobb Institute of Archaeology
- Institute of Archaeology, Chinese Academy of Social Sciences (IA CASS)
- Institute of Archaeology (Oxford)
- Institute of Archaeology and Art History, Cluj-Napoca
- Pandit Deendayal Upadhyaya Institute of Archaeology
- Vasile Pârvan Institute of Archaeology
- Vietnam Institute of Archaeology
- UCL Institute of Archaeology
