= La Retraite Roman Catholic Girls' School =

La Retraite Catholic Girls' School

Location
- Atkins Road; Clapham Park, Greater London, SW12 0AB; England; 51.44786°N 0.14308°W

Information
- Type: Voluntary aided school
- Motto: Walk humbly with God
- Religious affiliation: Roman Catholic
- Established: 1884
- Founder: La retraite sisters
- Local authority: Lambeth
- Department for Education URN: 100637 Tables
- Ofsted: Reports
- Head Teacher: Dominic Malins
- Gender: Girls
- Age: 11 to 19
- Enrolment: 915 as of January 2016
- Website: www.laretraite.lambeth.sch.uk

La Retraite Roman Catholic Girls' School is a Catholic secondary school and sixth form for girls, located in the Clapham Park area of the London Borough of Lambeth, England. The sixth form is mixed.

== History ==
The school was first established in 1880 by Les Dames De La Retraite, an order started in Brittany to enable women to spend time in the Catholic practice of 'retreat'. The nuns were called 'mother' and those who had traveled from France this time apparently aimed to establish a girls school in South London. The school later expanded into a house previously owned by the family of Philip de László, and then a house previously owned by Dan Leno. There were eventually several other schools in England run by the order - one in Bristol and another in Burnham on Sea and in the post-war period there were attempts to open schools elsewhere in England. There were also schools in France (St Germain-en-Laye, Angers) with which all the nuns were in contact and nuns moved unpredictably from one school to another. By World War II, the school ran from primary to the end of secondary. The school had always been forward looking - it used Montessori methods in its primary school and encouraged physical education and dance. It had a reputation for theatre producing at least one play a year - more in the years when Joan Littlewood was a pupil.

During World War II the school was evacuated to Horndean in Hampshire, but was rapidly moved from a site so close to Portsmouth that was needed for the military to Daventry. In 1942 the school returned to the Clapham Road site which it had to share with another school that had been bombed. It had been a fee-paying school but after the war it took up the Beveridge education plan and agreed to drop fees and take public school entrants. One result of this was that the demand that a deputy head be secular resulted in Vera Thorpe, the maths teacher, becoming deputy head. It then became a two form entry sixty students in all, the B class being the grammar entry and the A the rest. In 1945 as children returned to London there was considerable confusion of age and position. There were many families where the father was dead in the war and others where they were children of Polish free fighter who had stayed. The local Jewish community also saw the school as a reasonable place for their girls. The sixth form was, however, small as few families could or would afford the extra years for a girl who was welcomed as an employee by the local banks and business because of the school's reputation for well-behaved and ethical students. Those who completed their sixth form either went to university or to teachers colleges but some went to art school having been well taught by Miss Nicholson.

It was recognised officially by London County Council. In the 1970s, when selective education was abolished in London, the school became a comprehensive school. The school became grant-maintained for a time in the 1990s and opened its sixth form. In 1999 it then returned to local authority control as a voluntary aided school under the trusteeship of the Roman Catholic Archdiocese of Southwark.

== Academics ==
La Retraite Roman Catholic Girls' School offers GCSEs and BTECs as programmes of study for pupils. Students in the sixth form have the option to study a range of A Levels and further BTECs.

== Alumni ==
- Crystal Bennett (1918-1987) - archaeologist
- Cynthia Erivo (b. 1987) - actress and singer
