= William Lancaster (anthropologist) =

British social anthropologist (1938–2022)

William Osbert Lancaster (13 March 1938 – 19 May 2022) was a British social anthropologist who specialised in the study of the Arab world, particularly the bedouin tribes in the Levant and Middle East.

== Life and work ==
Lancaster was the son of Sir Osbert Lancaster and his first wife Karen Elizabeth Harris. He was schooled at Eton College.

Together with his wife Fidelity, Lancaster studied various tribes, communities and regions in the Arab world since 1971. The couple worked in Syria, Jordan, Saudi Arabia, Oman and the United Arab Emirates.

Lancaster's 1981 publication The Rwala Bedouin Today has been called "one of the best modern ethnographies on Middle Eastern ethnic groups" and a "highly regarded, unromanticized account of Bedouin life". Lancaster and his family lived with the Rwala tribe of the Anazah confederacy in Eastern Jordan and northern Saudi Arabia for several years while gathering data for the book.

Between 1991 and 1994 Lancaster was Director of the British Institute at Amman for Archaeology and History (BIAAH) at Amman in Jordan (now part of the Council for British Research in the Levant, CBRL). He was recently editor of Nomadic Peoples, the journal of the Commission on Nomadic Peoples. He was elected a Fellow of the Royal Asiatic Society in 1993.

When not undertaking anthropological fieldwork in the Middle East, Lancaster lived with his family at Lyness on the island of Hoy in the Orkney Islands, off the northern coast of Scotland. He died from an aneurysm on 19 May 2022, at the age of 84.

Lancaster had four children: Osbert, Nathaniel, Laura and Hetty.

== Selected publications ==
- 1981 The Rwala Bedouin Today Cambridge: Cambridge University Press. (Second edition 1997)
- 1982 "The Logic of the Rwala Response to Change" in Studies in Third World Societies No 18: Papers from IUAES Intercongress, Commission on Nomadic Peoples in Amsterdam 1981 Edited by Philip C. Salzman

=== Co-authored with Fidelity Lancaster ===
- 1986 "The Concept of Territory among the Rwala Bedouin" Nomadic Peoples 20: 41–48
- 1987 "The Function of Peripatetics in Rwala Bedouin Society" in Rao, A. (ed) The Other Nomads: Peripatetic Minorities in Cross-Cultural Perspective 311–321
- 1988 "Thoughts on the Bedouinisation of Arabia" Proceedings of the Seminar for Arabian Studies 18: 51–62
- 1990 "Modern ar-Risha: A Permanent Address" in Helms, Svend, Early Islamic Architecture of the Desert: A Bedouin Station in Eastern Jordan Edinburgh: Edinburgh University Press
- 1990 "Desert devices: the pastoral system of the Rwala Bedu" in J.G. Galaty and D.L. Johnson, eds. The world of pastoralism: herding systems in comparative perspective New York, Guilford Press; London, Belhaven Press, 177–194
- 1991 "Limitations on sheep and goat herding in the Eastern Badia of Jordan: an ethno-archaeological enquiry" Levant 23: 125–138
- 1993 "Graves and funerary monuments of the Ahl al-Ǧabal, Jordan" Arabian Archaeology and Epigraphy 4/3: 151–169
- 1993 "Sécheresse et stratégies de reconversion économique chez le bédouins de Jordanie" in R. Bocco, R. Jaubert and F. Metral, eds. Steppes d'Arabie, États, pasteurs, agriculteurs et commerçants: le devenir des zones sèches Geneva, Cahiers de l'IUED
- 1995 "Nomadic Fishermen of Ja'alan" Nomadic Peoples 36/37: 227–243
- 1997 "Indigenous resource management systems in the Bâdia of the Bilâd ash-Shâm" Journal of Arid Environments 35/2: 367–378
- 1998 "Who are these nomads? What do they do? Continuous Change or Changing Continuities?" in Jinat, Joseph and Khazanov, Anatoly M., eds, Changing Nomads in a Changing World Brighton 24–38
- 1999 People, land and water in the Arab Middle East: environments and landscapes in the Bilâd ash-Shâm Co-authored with Fidelity Lancaster Harwood Academic Publishers
- 1999 "On the nature of power in the works of Orientalist scholars and its contribution to a history of Bedouin society and nomad-sedentary relations at the Bilâd ash-Shâm" in Chatelard, G. and Tarawneh, M. (eds) Antonin Jaussen. Sciences sociale occidentales et patrimoine Arab Beirut: Centre d'Etudes et de Recherches sur le Moyen-Orient Contemporain, 143–178
