= Carol Palmer =

British anthropologist, environmental archaeologist and ethnobotanist

Carol Palmer is a British anthropologist, environmental archaeologist and ethnobotanist whose research focuses on rural societies, food production, landscape use and ethnobotany in the Middle East. She was Director of the Council for British Research in the Levant from 2020 to 2024 and is an Honorary Research Fellow at the UCL Institute of Archaeology. She is the editor of Peasant Agriculture in the Jerusalem Hills, scheduled for publication by Routledge in 2026.

== Education ==
Palmer completed her PhD at the University of Sheffield in 1994. Her thesis was entitled Reconstructing and interpreting ancient crop management practices: ethnobotanical investigations into traditional dryland farming in northern Jordan. She subsequently undertook postdoctoral research supported by the Council for British Research in the Levant at the University of Leicester and was a research associate at the University of Sheffield.

== Career and research ==
Palmer's research combines anthropology, ethnography, environmental archaeology and ethnobotany, with particular attention to rural livelihoods, foodways and landscape change in the Middle East. Her work has included research on traditional farming practices in northern Jordan, food identity among Fallāhīn and Bedouin communities, and the interpretation of archaeological evidence for crop management and activity areas.

She has contributed to archaeological and landscape survey projects in Europe and the Middle East, including the Antikythera Survey Project, the Wadi Faynan Landscape Survey, and the INEA project at Bournemouth University, where she was listed as a project partner. From 2020 to 2024, she served as Director of the Council for British Research in the Levant.

== Selected publications ==
- Palmer, Carol, ed. (2026). Peasant Agriculture in the Jerusalem Hills. Routledge. ISBN 9781041320982.
- Palmer, C. (2002). "Milk and cereals: identifying food and food identity among Fallāhīn and Bedouin in Jordan". Levant. 34 (1): 173–195. doi:10.1179/lev.2002.34.1.173.
- Palmer, C. (1998). "'Following the plough': the agricultural environment of northern Jordan". Levant. 30 (1): 129–165. doi:10.1179/lev.1998.30.1.129.
- Van der Veen, Marijke; Palmer, C. (1997). "Environmental factors and the yield potential of ancient wheat crops". Journal of Archaeological Science. 24 (2): 163–182. doi:10.1006/jasc.1996.0101.
- Palmer, C.; Russell, Kenneth W. (1993). "Traditional ards of Jordan" (PDF). Annual of the Department of Antiquities of Jordan. 37: 37–53.
