= Kenyon Institute =

British research institute in Jerusalem

- Founder: Robert Mond
- Established: 1919
- Director: Toufic Haddad
- Formerly called: British School of Archaeology in Jerusalem
- Location: Sheikh Jarrah, East Jerusalem, Palestine
- Coordinates: 31.79295°N 35.23138°E
- Interactive map of Kenyon Institute
- Website: cbrl.org.uk

The Kenyon Institute, previously known as the British School of Archaeology at Jerusalem (BSAJ), is a British research institute supporting humanities and social science studies in Israel and Palestine. It is part of the Council for British Research in the Levant (CBRL) and is supported by the British Academy.

== History ==
The institute was established in 1919 as the British School of Archaeology in Jerusalem (BSAJ). The London-based Palestine Exploration Fund was instrumental in its foundation.

The first Director was British archaeologist John Garstang, and among its earliest students was architect-archaeologist George Horsfield, later Chief Inspector of Antiquities in British Mandate Transjordan. An excavation at Tughbah Caves by BSAJ student Francis Turville-Petre in 1925 yielded an important prehistoric find, the Galilee skull. Under Garstang's directorship, the BSAJ began excavations on Mount Ophel, Jerusalem, with the Palestine Exploration Fund.

Garstang resigned his post as Director of the BSAJ in 1926 and British archaeologist John Winter Crowfoot, who had trained at the British School at Athens, became the School's second Director. With his wife, Molly Crowfoot, a noted expert in textiles, crafts and botany, John Crowfoot conducted excavations at Mount Ophel, Jerusalem (1927–1929), Jerash (1928–1930) and Samaria (1930–1935). Dorothy Garrod, who excavated at Mount Carmel as a BSAJ student in 1929 along with Mary Kitson-Clark and Elinor Ewbank, produced evidence of the Natufian culture.

The British School of Archaeology in Jerusalem had close ties to the American Schools of Oriental Research, led by archaeologist William Foxwell Albright, and the French École Biblique, through the Reverend Fathers Louis-Hugues Vincent, Raphaël Savignac and Félix-Marie Abel.

In 1998 the BSAJ merged with the British Institute at Amman for Archaeology and History to form the Council for British Research in the Levant (CBRL) and in 2001 was renamed the Kenyon Institute, after Kathleen Kenyon, to reflect the wider range of disciplines supported by the institute as part of the CBRL.

== Notable people ==
Directors

- John Garstang (1919–1926)
- John Winter Crowfoot (1926–1935)
- Philip Guy (1935–1939)
- George Kirk (1940–1947)
- Vacant
- Kathleen Kenyon (1952–1966)
- Basil Hennessy (1966–1970)
- Crystal Bennett (1970–1979)
- John Donald Wilkinson (1979–1984)
- Richard P. Harper (1984–1998)
- Joanne Clarke (1998–2001)
- Vacant
- Yuri Stoyanov (2006–2008)
- Jaimie Lovell (2008–2010)
- Omar Shweiki (Acting Director, 2011–2012)
- Mandy Turner (2012–2019)
- Toufic Haddad (2020–2024)

Other

- Peter Ackroyd, Chairman of the Council from 1979 to 1983

== See also ==
- Albright Institute of Archaeological Research
