= British Institute for Libyan and Northern African Studies =

British overseas research institute

The British Institute for Libyan and Northern African Studies (BILNAS), formerly the Society for Libyan Studies, is a British academic body and charitable organisation. Sponsored by The British Academy, it promotes scholarship on Libya and Northern Africa in the fields of archaeology, history, geography, the natural sciences and linguistics.

BILNAS hosts a programme of public lectures, seminars and other events in London and online on Libyan and Northern African culture and heritage.

== History ==
BILNAS was established in 1969 to support long-term archaeological projects in Libya and their subsequent publication. Projects supported include excavations and surveys at Sidi Khrebish (Berenice), Cyrene, Lepcis Magna and the Fezzan.

Recent projects have included a survey in the pre-desert valleys of Tripolitania, Islamic excavations at Barca (El Merj) and Medinet Sultan (Surt), and the publication of excavations conducted at Sabratha and Lepcis Magna in the 1950s.

In 2022, the organisation changed its name from the Society for Libyan Studies to the British Institute of Libyan and Northern African Studies to reflect a broadening of the organisation’s geographical remit.

== Publications ==
Libyan Studies (0263-7189 (Print), 2052-6148 (Online)) is the annual journal of record of the British Institute for Libyan and Northern African Studies, appearing in November each year. Contributions cover archaeology, ancient and Islamic history, geology, geography and social sciences. It is currently published by Cambridge University Press.

BILNAS also produces academic monographs based on research in and around Libya, as well as more popular books designed to appeal to a wider audience with a general interest in Libya and North Africa under the imprint Silphium Press.

== Archive ==
The BILNAS archive is held at the School of Archaeology and Ancient History at the University of Leicester. The archival material covers Libyan archaeology and heritage and includes collections of rare books, manuscripts, documents, photographs and drawings, including much material from before 1969

== See also ==
- British Institute at Ankara
- British Institute in Eastern Africa
- British Institute of Persian Studies
- British School at Athens
- British School at Rome
- British Institute for the Study of Iraq
- Council for British Research in the Levant
