= British Institute in Amman =

British research institute in Jordan

British Institute in Amman (BIA)
- Founder: Crystal Bennett
- Established: 1975
- Director: Jane Humphris
- Formerly called: British Institute at Amman for Archaeology and History (BIAAH)
- Address: 6 Al-Baouneyah Street; Qaiwar Complex; Jabal Al-Lweibdeh; Amman; Mailing address: P. O. Box 9124, Amman, Jordan 11191
- Location: Jabel Luweibdeh, Amman, Jordan
- Coordinates: 32.012600°N 35.862441°E
- Interactive map of British Institute in Amman (BIA)
- Website: cbrl.org.uk

The British Institute in Amman (BIA, Arabic: المعهد البريطاني في عمّان), formerly known as the British Institute at Amman for Archaeology and History (BIAAH), is a research institute in Amman, Jordan. It is part of the Council for British Research in the Levant. The BIA's patron is Prince Hassan bin Talal and in 2024, its director was Dr Jane Humphris.

== History ==
After the Six-Day War in 1967, it became increasingly difficult for archaeologists to use the British School of Archaeology in Jerusalem (BSAJ) as base for conducting fieldwork in neighbouring countries. In response, the BSAJ established a store of field equipment in Jordan. In the early 1970s the Director of the BSAJ, Crystal Bennett, conducted excavations in southern Jordan using this store and her private flat in Amman. However, the need for a larger and more permanent base became apparent when Bennett was asked by the Jordanian Department of Antiquities to direct major excavations of the Amman Citadel. She rented a large house opposite the University of Jordan and established it as the new British Institute at Amman for Archaeology and History (BIAAH) in 1975. Bennett served as both the Director of the BSAJ and the BIAAH until 1978. She then retired from the BSAJ and relocated to Amman full-time. In the same year, the British Academy agreed to register the BIAAH as an official overseas institute.

The BIAAH remained an independent institute until 1998, when a review by the British Academy recommended that the BIAAH and BSAJ be combined to form the Council for British Research in the Levant. In 2009 it was renamed the British Institute in Amman, to reflect the wider range of disciplines supported by the institute since the merger.

== Facilities ==
Up until 2022, the BIA was located in the Tla' Al Ali district of Amman, close to the University of Jordan and the original BIAAH building. It housed a public, English-language reference library, specialising in the archaeology, anthropology, history, and international relations of Jordan; an archaeological laboratory; equipment store; and accommodation for visiting scholars and field crews.

In March 2022, the CBRL moved to the Jabel Luweibdeh area of Amman.

In 2023, the BIA signed an MOU with the International Council on Monuments and Sites in Jordan.

The BIA also has ties with the Royal Scientific Society. In 2020, the BIA and the RSS created a new Jordan-UK El Hassan bin Talal Research Chair in Sustainability.

== Directors ==
- Crystal Bennett (1978–1983)
- Andrew Garrard (1983–1989)
- Alison McQuitty (1989–1991)
- William Lancaster (1991–1994)
- Alison McQuitty (1994–1999)
- Bill Finlayson (1999–2009)
- Carol Palmer (2009–2024)
- Jane Humphris (2024 - )

== See also ==
- American Center of Oriental Research
