= Council for British Research in the Levant =

Non-profit organisation

The Council for British Research in the Levant (CBRL) is a non-profit organisation that promotes humanities and social science research in the Levant. It consists of two research institutes, the Kenyon Institute in Jerusalem and the British Institute in Amman (BIA) in Amman, Jordan.

== History ==
The CBRL was established in 1998 as an amalgamation of the British School of Archaeology in Jerusalem (now the Kenyon Institute) and the British Institute at Amman for Archaeology and History (now the British Institute in Amman). While its predecessors mainly existed to support archaeological research in their respective host countries, the newly formed CBRL, sponsored by the British Academy, broadened its remit to include research into the history, culture and society of the entire Levant.

Plans to open a CBRL institute in Damascus have been suspended due to the ongoing Syrian Civil War.

== Publications ==
=== Levant ===
Levant (ISSN 1756-3801) is an academic journal of archaeological research in the Levant, first published in 1969 by the British School of Archaeology in Jerusalem, and later by the CBRL. It is currently produced by Maney Publishing and publishes three issues per year.

Since 2004 the CBRL has also published research monographs as the "Levant Supplementary Series".

=== Contemporary Levant ===
The CBRL launched a second journal, Contemporary Levant (ISSN 2058-184X), in 2016, covering research on contemporary politics, society and culture in the Levant.

=== Bulletin of the Council for British Research in the Levant ===
The CBRL also produces an annual Bulletin (ISSN 1752-7279) as its document of record, which also contains reports on research sponsored by the CBRL in the previous year aimed at a general readership. It was formerly known as the CBRL Newsletter.

== Directors ==
- Alison McQuitty (1998–1999)
- Bill Finlayson (1999–2018)
- Carol Palmer (2018–2024)
- Jane Humphris (2024–)

== See also ==
- British Institute in Amman
- British Institute at Ankara
- British Institute in Eastern Africa
- British Institute of Persian Studies
- British School at Athens
- British School at Rome
- British Institute for the Study of Iraq
- British Institute for Libyan and Northern African Studies
