= 2026 Iranian strikes on Oman =

- Part of the 2026 Iran war and the Strait of Hormuz crisis
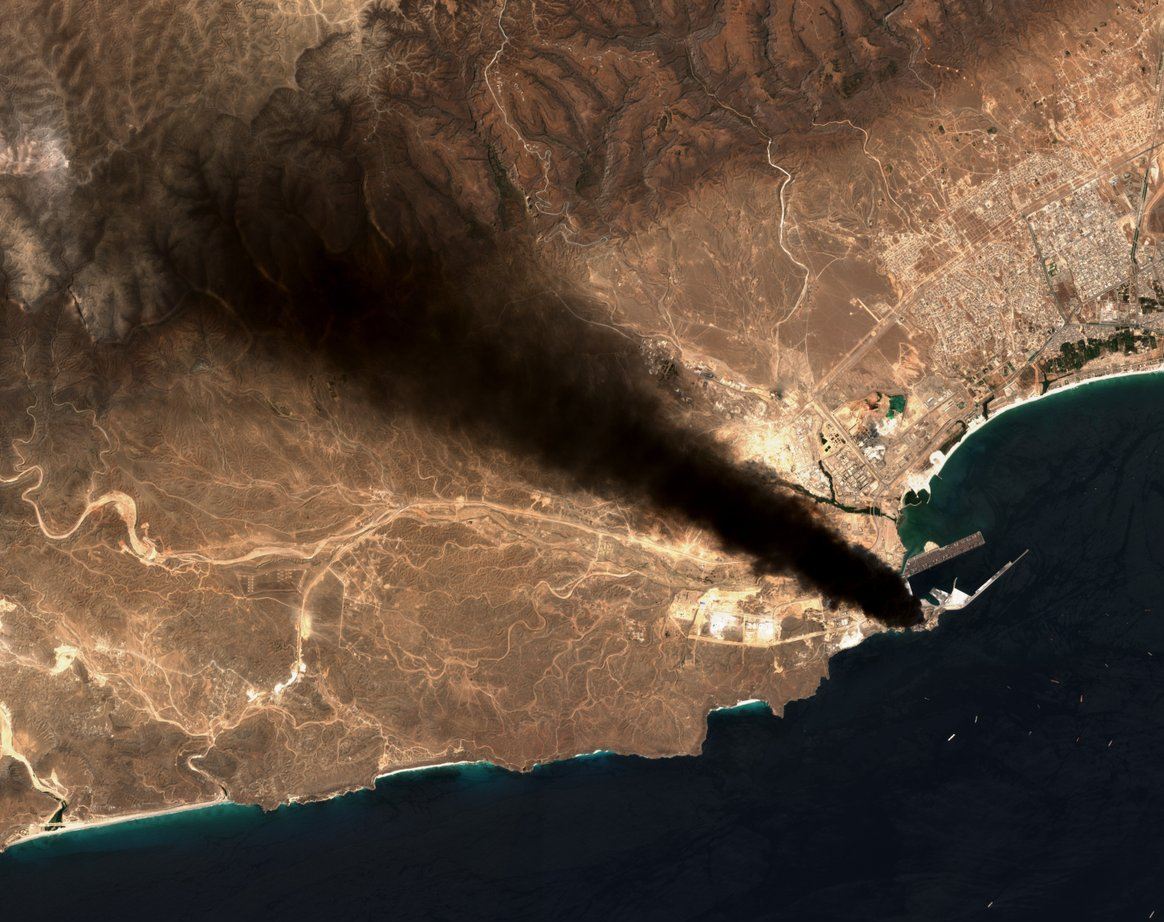
- Satellite image of smoke rising from the Port of Salalah on 13 March
Date	1 March 2026 – present
Location	Oman and the Strait of Hormuz
Status	Ongoing

Belligerents
Iran	United States; Oman (defensive only)

Units involved
- See order of battle

Casualties and losses
(Iran) At least 19 drones intercepted	(United States) 1 A-10 ground attack fighter jet destroyed, one pilot injured (United States) 1 Boeing AH-64 Apache helicopter destroyed
- 14 civilians killed, 35 injured

Since 1 March 2026, as part of the 2026 Iran war, Iran has been launching a series of drone and missile strikes on sites in Oman and its territorial waters. This includes the Port of Duqm and the Port of Salalah, which are used by the United States. Separate drone strikes also targeted ports and industrial zones in Sohar, Bukha, and Mina Al Fahal, alongside attacks against Omani territorial waters in the Strait of Hormuz and Gulf of Oman. The attacks have killed 14 people and injured 35 others.

== Background ==
Oman and Iran have consistently shared diplomatic and economic ties dating back to the Pahlavi period, as Oman considers Iran not to be a threat as perceived by the other Arab states of the Persian Gulf.

During the Pahlavi dynasty of Iran, the two countries had economic ties. During the Dhofar Rebellion in Oman, Mohammad Reza Shah intervened in support of the Omani government, providing troops and weapons.

Muscat has historically been a venue for diplomacy between Tehran and Washington. Since the early 2000s, Oman has hosted multiple rounds of nuclear and political talks between the two countries, whom have had no formal diplomatic relations since 7 April 1980.

In 2019, Oman and the United States made an agreement for US military access to the ports of Duqm and Salalah.

=== Negotiations ===
On 12 April 2025, Iran and the United States began a series of negotiations aimed at reaching a nuclear peace agreement, with the first round held in the Al Alam Palace in Muscat. The second round of Omani-mediated talks took place in Rome on 19 April 2025, followed by a third high-level round in Muscat around a week later. On 25 February, Iranian Foreign Minister Abbas Araghchi stated that a "historic" agreement with the United States to avert military conflict was "within reach".

A third round of indirect talks mediated by Omani foreign minister Badr Al Busaidi took place on 26 February, at the residence of Oman's ambassador to the UN in Geneva, Switzerland. The talks happened in the morning and evening of this day, with a pause for the American negotiators to meet a Ukrainian delegation, and focused on Iran's nuclear program. In the midst of this round of negotiations, it was reported that the sides were far from reaching a deal.

On 28 February 2026, the US and Israel launched a series of strikes against Iran, targeting key officials, military commanders, and facilities. Iran replied by launching strikes against Israel and American military bases in the Middle East, as well as civilian targets. Iran's Supreme Leader Ali Khamenei and a number of Iranian officials, including the Minister of Defense Aziz Nasirzadeh, and the head of Iran's Revolutionary Guard Mohammad Pakpour, were killed in the strikes.

After the US-Israeli attack on Iran, Al-Busaidi said that he was dismayed and that "active and serious negotiations" had been undermined.

== Incidents ==
=== March ===
==== 1 March ====
Following the initial Israeli–United States strikes on Iran, two drones hit Duqm Port in the Al Wusta Governorate, with one striking a mobile workers' housing unit, injuring a foreign worker. The second was intercepted and neutralised, with debris falling near fuel storage tanks. That same day, the Palau-flagged Skylight and Marshall Islands-flagged MKD VYOM tankers were targeted off Oman's coast, the tanker Skylight at 5 nmi (9.3 km; 5.8 mi) north of the Port of Khasab in the Musandam Governorate and the tanker MKD VYOM was attacked by a drone boat approximately 52 nmi (96 km; 60 mi) off the coast of Muscat, triggering an explosion in the main engine room. The attacks resulting in three deaths and three injuries. Another Indian national was critically injured in an night attack on the vessel LCT Alyh.

==== 2 March ====
Omani authorities announced that the Honduras-flagged bitumen ship Athe Nova was attacked and damaged by Iran.

==== 3 March ====
A fuel tank at Duqm Port was hit by several unmanned aircraft. The resulting damage was contained and no casualties were recorded. On the same day, Oman reported intercepting two Iranian drones in Dhofar, while a third drone crashed near the Port of Salalah.

==== 4 March ====
The IRGCN NEDSA Navy stated they blew up 10 commercial vessels that were attempting to travel through the Strait of Hormuz. A Malta-flagged container ship Safeen Prestige was attacked by Iran in the Strait of Hormuz, resulting in no casualties, but the ship was abandoned.

==== 6 March ====
The UAE-flagged tugboat Mussafah 2 was attacked by Iran in the Omani territorial waters of the Strait of Hormuz, killing four crew members and three severely injured.

==== 7 March ====
The IRGC said that it attacked the Malta-flagged oil tanker Prima with a drone after "ignoring repeated warnings from the IRGC Navy regarding the prohibition of traffic and the unsafe nature of the Strait of Hormuz".

==== 11 March ====
External videos
- Ship crew film drone strike on oil facility at Oman's Salalah port
- Drones strike oil silos at Oman's Salalah port

Salalah Port was once again targeted by drones, setting fire to two fuel tanks and suspending the port's operations. On the same day, another drone was intercepted north of Duqm.

The Thailand-flagged bulk carrier Mayuree Naree (IMO 9323649) was hit by two missiles shortly after passing the Strait of Hormuz. The vessel caught fire and most of the crew abandoned ship and were rescued by the Royal Navy of Oman. The attack resulting in three deaths.

==== 12 March ====
A drone was intercepted over the airspace of Khasab, with no casualties or damage reported.

==== 13 March ====
Two people were killed and several injured in a drone strike in Sohar. One drone fell in the Al Awahi Industrial Area, killing two expatriates and injuring 11, while the other crashed in an open area with no casualties reported.

==== 18–19 March ====
During a period of two days, reports said there were attacks on energy facilities in Oman, mainly in the port of Salalah.

==== 28 March ====
Two drones crashed into the Port of Salalah, causing moderate injuries to one foreign worker, the attack caused minor damage to one of its cranes.

=== April ===
==== 3 April ====
A Fairchild Republic A-10 Thunderbolt II was shot down by Iranian fire off the coast of Bukha, Oman; the pilot ejected but needed medical attention. The aircraft was destroyed.

=== May ===
==== 4 May ====
Iran launched limited attacks against Oman and the UAE. In this attack, two residents in Bukha were injured after a residential building housing employees of a company were targeted. While unclear the type of attack, the incident left two expatriates with moderate injuries and caused damage to four vehicles parked at the site, while shattering windows at a nearby house.

American forces reportedly destroyed six or seven small Iranian boats in the Strait of Hormuz during a clash. The boats were destroyed after they allegedly tried to interfere with the transit of two US flagged commercial vessels and two Navy destroyer vessels (USS Truxtun and USS Mason).

==== 5 May ====
The CMA CGM line stated that one of their freighters, CMA CGM San Antonio, was attacked in the Strait of Hormuz late on 5 May. Eight crewmembers were injured and were evacuated for treatment.

==== 13 May ====
The Indian-flagged small freighter Haji Ali reported to have been stricken by a drone or missile off the coast of Oman and sank. All 14 crewmembers were rescued by Omani authorities.

=== June ===
==== 5 June ====
Mina Al Fahal Port was allegedly attacked by a drone, with the explosion occurring between the single-buoy mooring (SBM) 1 and 2 berths. Petroleum Development Oman, an Omani production company denied this and said that productions at the port were continuing normally.

Iran said it launched warning missiles and drones towards American warships in the Gulf of Oman. The US rejected the claim, saying doing so would be a serious violation of the truce.

==== 8 June ====
CENTCOM said that American forces disabled the Marivex, an unladen oil tanker which was heading to Kharg Island after the vessel allegedly ignored multiple warnings. The Indian shipping ministry said that 24 Indian crew members were on board the tanker, adding that a fire was reported but that all were safe and they were rescued with Omani help.

==== 9 June ====
A United States Army Boeing AH-64 Apache 'went down' in the Strait of Hormuz off the coast of Oman. Both crewmembers survived and were rescued by a USN surface drone.

==== 11 June ====
Centcom executed a strike with two Hellfire missiles on the Jalveer ship in the Gulf of Oman, targeting its engine room while it was transporting Iranian oil. The ship's crew, all Indian nationals, allegedly did not follow directions from American forces but were subsequently rescued.

==== 25 June ====
Iran declared a new Hormuz route laid out by Oman and the International Maritime Organization (IMO) "unacceptable and dangerous", warning against ships transiting with no approval from it. On the same day, the British military announced that the Ever Lovely cargo vessel was damaged by an unknown projectile in the Hormuz 7.5 nautical miles (13.9 km; 8.6 mi) southeast of Omani port of Dahit while travelling via the UN-approved route. The US accused Iran of carrying out the attack. The IMO chose to halt its planned evacuation of ships stranded around the Hormuz following the attack, causing oil prices to surge as much as 4%.

==== 26 June ====
Trump accused Iran of violating the truce with US by launching drone attacks on ships in the Hormuz.

==== 27 June ====
The oil tanker Kiku was struck by a projectile in the strait, damaging its bridge. CENTCOM said that the vessel was hit by an Iranian attack drone, and the US military responded by conducting airstrikes against Iranian military and communications sites near the strait. The US military announced it struck Iranian military surveillance infrastructure, communication systems, air defense sites, drone storage facilities, and minelayer capabilities at the commander-in-chief's direction in retaliation to the Iranian attack against a ship in the Hormuz.

=== July ===
==== 4 July ====
the UK and France stated that Oman had committed to work with both countries to ensure safe navigation through its territorial waters in the Hormuz. Iran warned the UK and France against providing military support to defend shipping in the Hormuz.

==== 7 July ====
Iran reportedly launched at least two missiles at commercial vessels including Al Rekayyat, a liquefied natural gas tanker owned by Nakilat QGTS.QA, part of Qatari LNG industry in the Hormuz, causing significant damage. Qatar accused Iran of carrying out the attack against its gas tanker, describing it as a clear violation of international law. On the same day, the UK military said that another tanker the Wedyan in the Hormuz was hit by an unidentified projectile. Saudis condemned Iranian attacks on their oil tanker and Qatari tanker. Less than 24 hours later, the IRGC attacked a third vessel the Cyprus Prosperity in the Strait. In response, the US Department of the Treasury reimposed sanctions on Iran's oil exports that were lifted after the signing of the Islamabad Memorandum, and later CENTCOM announced a wave of strikes targeting Iranian military sites near the Strait of Hormuz.

==== 11 July ====
The IRGC navy said that it closed the Strait until further notice after firing a warning shot at a vessel trying to transit through an unapproved route.

==== 12 July ====
CENTCOM said the IRGC had attacked the M/V GFS Galaxy, causing a fire on board and "significant engine room damage". The UK navy-sponsored UKMTO agency says the crew of the container ship that has been attacked off the coast of Oman has been "rescued by local authorities". Three people were injured in the attack and one Indian sailor is missing. The Indian government strongly condemns the incident. The body of the missing Indian sailor was recovered 60 hours after the Iranian attack on the vessel.

The IRGC it claimed that it struck and destroyed logistical support centers and refueling stations for US aircraft carriers at the Duqm Port. Oman said drones were launched towards Musandam Governorate.

==== 13 July ====
Iran claimed that it hit and destroyed radar systems in Oman.

==== 17 July ====
Iran said that it targeted an American maritime surveillance radar in Oman.

==== 20 July ====
Two Greek-owned tankers, the Kavomaleas and the Acheloos, were struck by projectiles on the Omani side of the Strait of Hormuz. A fire was sparked in the Kavomaleas's engine room, forcing its crew to evacuate. The tanker was reportedly towed into Iranian waters following the attack.

==== 21 July ====
Kuwaiti tanker Kaifan was struck on its poop deck by a projectile 8 nautical miles northeast of Limah in Oman, disabling its main engine and causing minor injuries to two crew.

==== 31 July ====
The Bermuda-flagged LNG tanker Gaslog Shanghai was struck and disabled by a projectile while exiting the Strait of Hormuz with Qatari LNG.

=== August ===
==== 13 August ====
The ADNOC-owned tankers Navig8 Messi and Tarif were struck by UAVs in the Strait, causing minor damage to both vessels. The UAE accused Iran of being behind the attacks.

==== 14 August ====
ADNOC announced that another one of its vessels were struck in the Strait the day prior, causing no casualties. The same day, the UKMTO reported an attack on a bulk carrier in the area, although it was unclear if these were the same incident. The vessel was later identified as bulk carrier Al Watan

==== 18 August ====
The Greek-owned bulk carrier Minoan Dignity was attacked in the Strait, killing its chief engineer. The Omani Coast Guard assisted the crew after attempts to evacuate the ship via helicopter failed.

==== 24 August ====
UKMTO reported that the Liberian-registered, Greek-owned, oil tanker Metro Venetian was struck by an unknown projectile 9nm northeast of Ash-Shishah, causing damage to the engine room and the vessel to be disabled.

==== 25 August ====
UKMTO reported that a Kuwaiti oil tanker, Al-Salam II, was hit by a projectile, causing a small hole and a small fire on board.

== Reactions ==
=== Iran ===
On 2 March, Iranian Foreign Minister Abbas Araghchi stated that the attacks on Oman were not their choice and were carried out by Iranian military units that are acting independently based on general instructions that have been given to them. Iranian General Staff said it did not order a military strike on Omani territory and stated Oman remains a "friend and neighbour". However Iran continued to carry out strikes even after the statement.

Iran said it was not involved in the attacks on Salalah Port. Ebrahim Zolfaghari, the spokesperson for a key command unit of Iran's Islamic Revolutionary Guard Corps, called the attack "very suspicious" and said Tehran was investigating it, according to Iranian state media, adding that he viewed Oman as a "friendly neighbouring and brotherly country".

In 20 March, Iran's Supreme Leader Mojtaba Khamenei released a written statement denying that Iran or its allied forces were behind the drone attacks in Oman and Turkey. He claimed these incidents were "false flag" operations orchestrated by Israel to "sow discord between Iran and its neighbors".

On 25 April, Iranian foreign minister Abbas Araghchi met with Oman's Sultan Haitham bin Tariq in during a one-day visit to Oman after he departed Islamabad after talks with Pakistani leaders, to discuss the "evolving" regional situation and mediation efforts to end the 2026 Iran war.

On 3 August, Iran is in talks with Oman, but the agreement is not enough to open the Strait of Hormuz, according to Foreign Ministry spokesman Esmail Baghaei. On 6 August, Oman accepted the framework of an agreement with Iran to temporarily reopen the Hormuz.

On 8 August, The IRGC stated that reopening the Hormuz is not dependent on talks with Oman but rather on the US accepting Iran's conditions.

On 17 August, Iran stated that it reached an agreement with Oman over the Hormuz. Esmail Baghaei, Iran's Foreign Ministry spokesman, rejected talks on extending the MOU, state outlet Tasnim reported.

On 24 August, Iran announced it blacklisted 45 tankers which have violated its rules for passing through the Hormuz, and would take action against any vessels transferring loads with them.

On 26 August, The IRGC announced that Iran and Oman reached deals on the Hormuz share and its revenue.

=== United States ===
On 14 March, the US State Department ordered all non-essential government staff and their families to leave Oman.

On 28 May, the US president Donald Trump threatened to 'blow up' Oman if it fails to "behave" in a casual aside during a cabinet meeting after reports of talks between Iran and Oman about jointly charging a toll for ships passing through the Strait of Hormuz.

On 13 August, US defence secretary Pete Hegseth stated that the US can maintain a naval blockade on Iranian ports "indefinitely".

On 17 August, Donald Trump once again threatened to bomb Oman if it "got in the way" of U.S. talks with Iran.

On 18 August, analysts from maritime intelligence firm Kpler told CNN on that Iran looks to have lost control of the strait partially and is unable to impose tolls due to increased usage of the U.N.-authorized Omani transit route. (Note: Oil tankers chartered by Kuwait, Saudi Arabia and the United Arab Emirates pass the strait with their transponders turned off.)

On 25 August, US officials with firsthand knowledge corroborated Trump's assertion that the US Navy had cleared mines from the Hormuz Traffic Separation Scheme, Oman's primary maritime corridor with Iran, adding that over the last few months, underwater drones carried out a systematic scanning of the area, identifying over 100 objects suspected of having mines, which were then removed or detonated by private contractors. Trump added that the US will destroy Iranian vessels laying more mines in the Hormuz.

== See also ==
- Saudi Arabia in the 2026 Iran war
- Kuwait in the 2026 Iran war
- United Arab Emirates in the 2026 Iran war
- 2026 Iranian strikes on Bahrain
- 2026 Iranian strikes on the Kurdistan Region
- 2026 strikes on Akrotiri and Dhekelia
- Iran-Oman relations
