= Faak al-As'ad Strait =

Omani strait by the Strait of Hormuz

Coordinates: 26°21′32″N 56°30′35″E

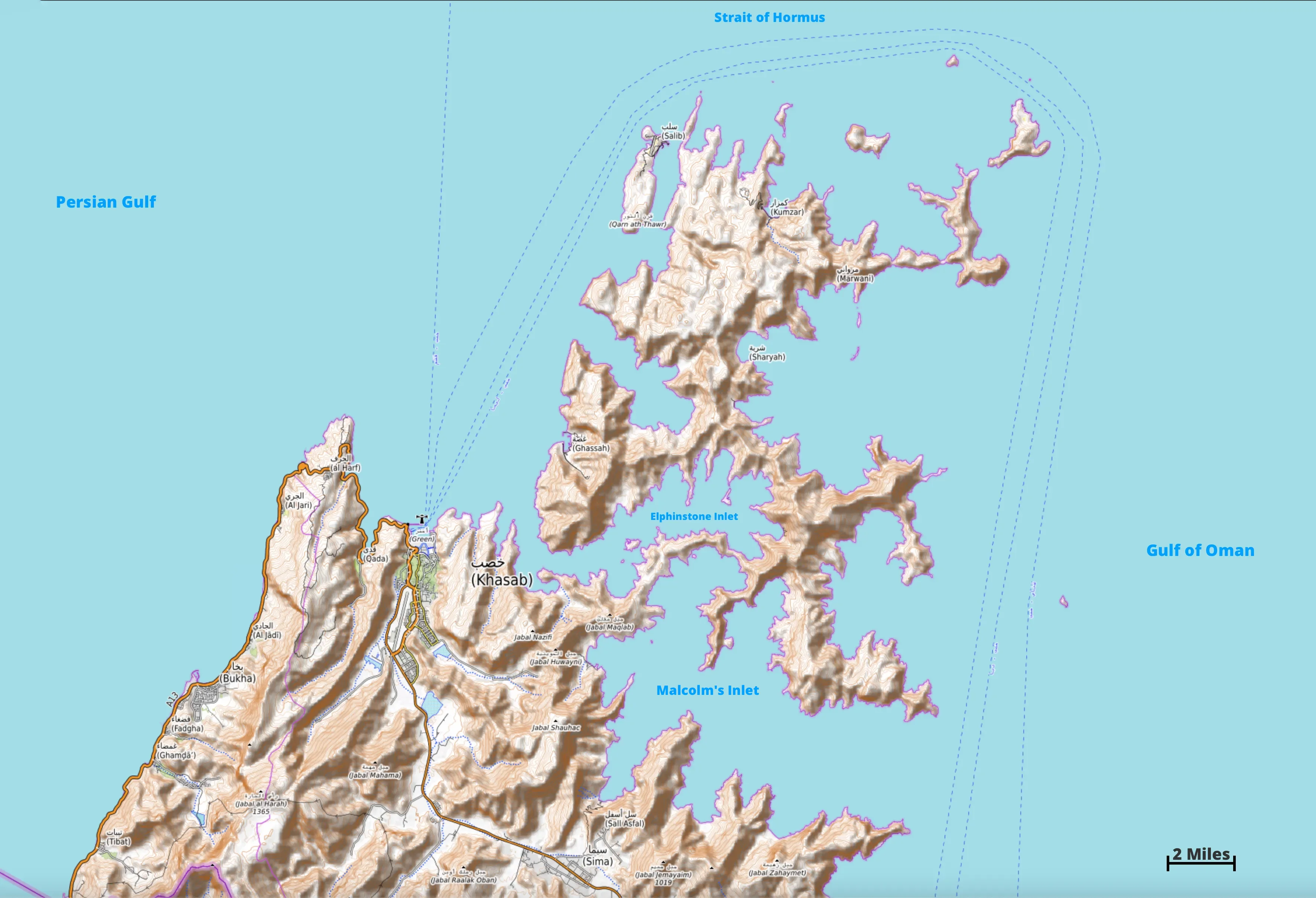
Musandam Island is the second furthest to the northeast in this image; the Faak al-As'ad Strait to its immediate southwest not named at this scale of two miles (3.2 km)

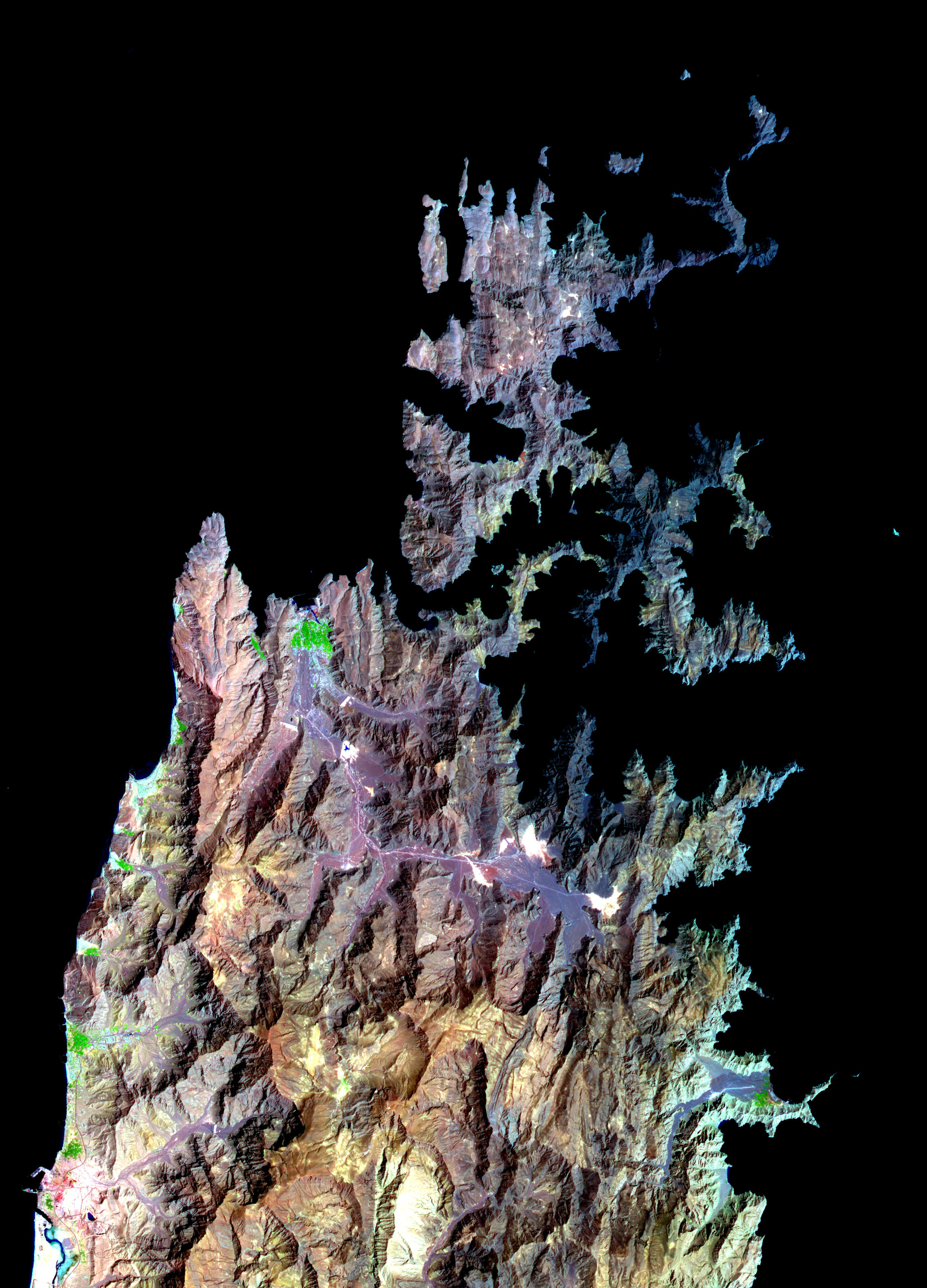
False color satellite imagery of Musandam Peninsula, itself the southeast terminus of the Arab Peninsula

Faak al-As'ad Strait (lit. The Freeing of the Lion) is located in the Musandam Governorate of Oman. A part of the strategic Musandam Peninsula (one of the defining land component of the Hormuz Strait), it is a Class H strait which, at 94 feet (28.7 m) depth and 1,600 feet (490 m) is a minor side passage for the crude oil tanker traffic for which the region is famous. During the 2026 Iran War rumors spread on-line that the strait had been dredged by the US Navy to create this capability—a claim which was met with some ribaldry.

Tectonically on the edge of the Arabian Plate, which is pushing beneath the Eurasian Plate, it is one of the valleys of the peninsula which has over the millennia filled with water.

== See also ==
- Images of the strait
