= Sayh =

Sayh may refer to:

- Sayh, United Arab Emirates
- Sayh, Yemen
