= Road signs in Oman =

Road signs as used in Oman

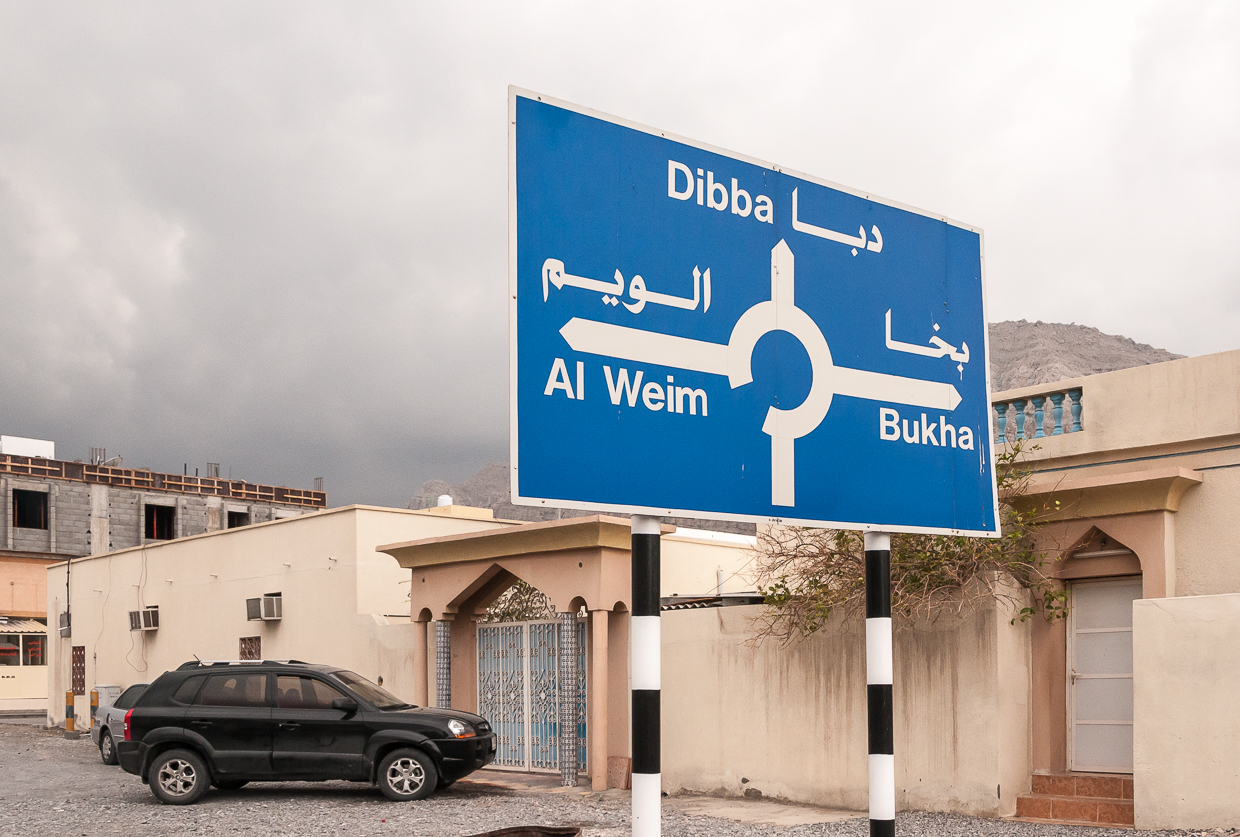
Roundabout sign in Khasab, Musandam Peninsula.

Road signs in Oman are regulated primarily by Highway Design Standards 2010 approved by the Sultanate of Oman – Ministry of Transport and Communications.

== Warning signs ==
Curve to the left

Curve to the right

Double curve, first to the left

Double curve, first to the right

Steep descent

Steep ascent

Road narrows

Road narrows on the left side

Road narrows on the right side

End of dual carriageway

Quayside or riverbank

Uneven road

Bump

Dip

Slippery road

Loose gravel

Falling rocks from the left side

Falling rocks from the right side

Pedestrian crossing

Children

Cyclists

Camels

Horses

Wild animals

Roadworks

Traffic lights

Low-flying aircraft

Crosswinds

Two-way traffic

Other dangers

Roundabout ahead

Countdown marker (100m)

Countdown marker (200m)

Countdown marker (300m)

Minor road merges from the left

Minor road merges from the right

Minor road on the left side

Minor road on the right side

Crossroads

T-junction

Merge with major road from the left side

Merge with major road from the right side

Staggered junction

Staggered junction

Two-way traffic across one-way carriageway

Tunnel

Height restriction ahead

Floodways

Electric overhead cables

Divert to opposite carriageway

Left lane of dual carriageway closed

Sand dunes

Chervon to left (single)

Chervon to left

Chervon to right (single)

Chervon to right

Give way ahead

Stop ahead

== Regulatory signs ==
Give way

Stop

No entry

No vehicles

No motor vehicles, except motorcycles

No motorcycles

No bicycles

No buses

No trucks

No trailers

No pedestrians

No animal-drawn vehicles

No handcarts

No tractors

Maximum width

Maximum height

Maximum weight

Maximum weight per axle

Maximum length

No left turn

No right turn

No U-turn from the left

No U-turn from the right

No overtaking

No overtaking by trucks

Speed limit (60 km/h)

No audible warning devices

Customs

End of all restrictions

End of speed limit (60 km/h)

End of overtaking prohibition

No parking

No stopping

Turn left

Turn right

Go straight

Turn left ahead

Turn right ahead

Roundabout

Go straight or turn left

Go straight or turn right

Pass onto left

Pass onto right

Pass either side

Meter zone

End of meter zone

Trucks, keep right

Minimum speed limit (60 km/h)

== Information signs ==
Pedestrian crossing

Hospital

Parking

One-way traffic

Dead end

Dead end on the right side

Dead end on the left side

Dead end on the upper-left side

Dead end on the upper-right side

Motorway

End of motorway

Bus stop

First aid

Breakdown service

Telephone

Emergency telephone

Petrol station

Light refreshment

Camping site

Caravan site

Camping and caravan site

Youth hostel

Pedestrian subway

Kilometer post sign

Trucks over ... tonne not to use bridge

U-turn permitted except by trucks

Escape lane ahead
