= A13 road (Oman) =

Road in Musandam, Oman

Arterial Road A13
- Khasab–Tibat Road
- A13 highlighted in red
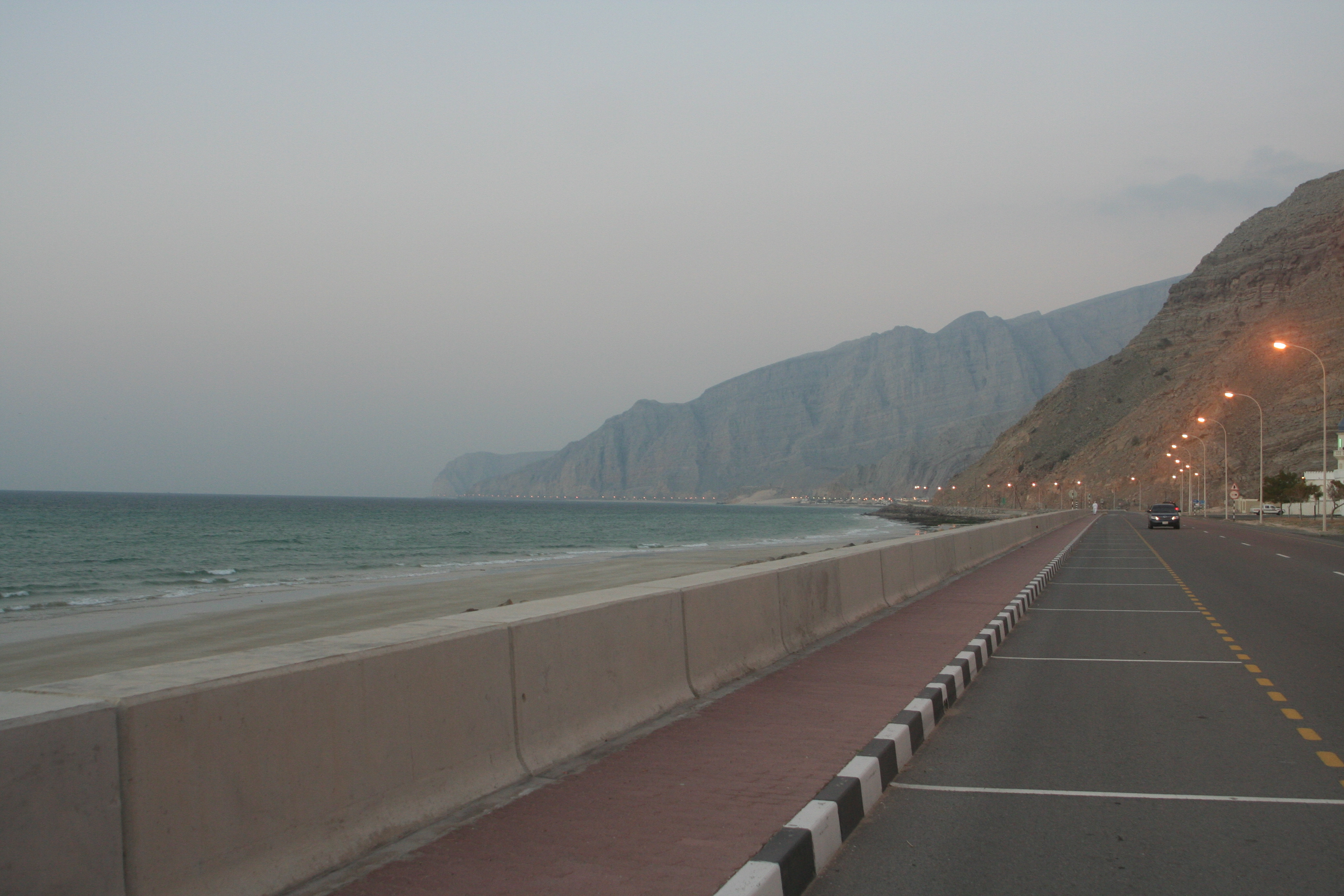
- The A13 alongside the Khasab Corniche

Route information
- Length: 49 km (30 mi)

Major junctions
- North end: D901 - al Sina'iyah Road
- D900 - Sall A'la Road; L900 - Al Hisn Road; L908 - Qada Road
- South end: Tibat Border Post

Location
- Country: Oman
- Major cities: Bukha, Khasab
- Towns: Ghamda, al Jadi, al Harf, Qada
- Villages: Tibat, Fadgha, Hil, al Jari, Hanna, Mukhi

Highway system
- Transport in Oman

The A13, also officially known as Khasab–Tibat Road (Arabic: طريق خصب - تيبات) and formerly designated as Route 2 (Arabic: طريق ٢), is an arterial road in the Sultanate of Oman specifically in the Musandam exclave. The main road runs from the border of the United Arab Emirates to the regional capital Khasab. The A13 starts with only one lane on each side until it merges into a dual carriageway right after entering the city of Khasab and almost always runs along the coast of the Persian Gulf.

== Route description ==
The A13 begins at the Omani border post which borders the United Arab Emirates in the emirate of Ras al-Khaimah. Eight kilometres (5.0 mi) after the border post the route intersects with the town of Bukha. Bukha is the largest town on the A13 up to Khasab. Throughout the next 20 kilometres (12 mi) of the route there are several small villages such as al-Jadi and al-Jirri while there also exists a turnoff onto a gravel road which leads to the northernmost point of the main island of Musandam. As drivers reach the end of the route to the city of Khasab the road widens into a dual carriageway with two lanes on each side. The route then ends at Khasab-New Souk Roundabout. From the roundabout, one road leads further into the industrial area and another into the sparsely populated hinterland of Musandam.

== See also ==
- Transport in Oman
