= Shinas (ferry) =

Omani catamaran ferry

History
- Name: HSC Shinas
- Owner: Sultanate of Oman
- Operator: National Ferries Company
- Route: Shinas-Khasab
- Ordered: 2006
- Builder: Austal
- Launched: 2008
- Identification: IMO number: 9396177; MMSI number: 461000050; Callsign: A4BA2
- Status: Active

General characteristics
- Class & type: Catamaran Ferry
- Length: 64.8m
- Beam: 16.5m
- Draft: 2.1m
- Installed power: Four 6.5 MW MTU 20V1163 Diesel engines
- Propulsion: Four Rolls-Royce/Kamewa 90SII water jets
- Speed: 55.9kt (cruising at 52kt)
- Capacity: 208
- Crew: 12

Shinas is a catamaran ferry in service on the Shinas–Khasab route in Oman, reportedly the fastest diesel ferry in the world. The route connects Musandam Governorate, an exclave of Oman at the tip of the Musandam peninsula, to Oman proper, without crossing through United Arab Emirates like the overland route.
