= Musandam =

Musandam may refer to:

- Musandam Governorate, the Omani part of the Musandam Peninsula
- Musandam Peninsula
