= Sayh, Oman =

Sayh
- Location within Oman
- Coordinates: 25°56′0″N 56°4′0″E
- Country: Oman
- Governorate: Musandam
- Elevation: 195 m (640 ft)

Sayh is the name of a settlement in the Omani exclave of Musandam.
