= Telegraph Island =

Omani island in Strait of Hormuz

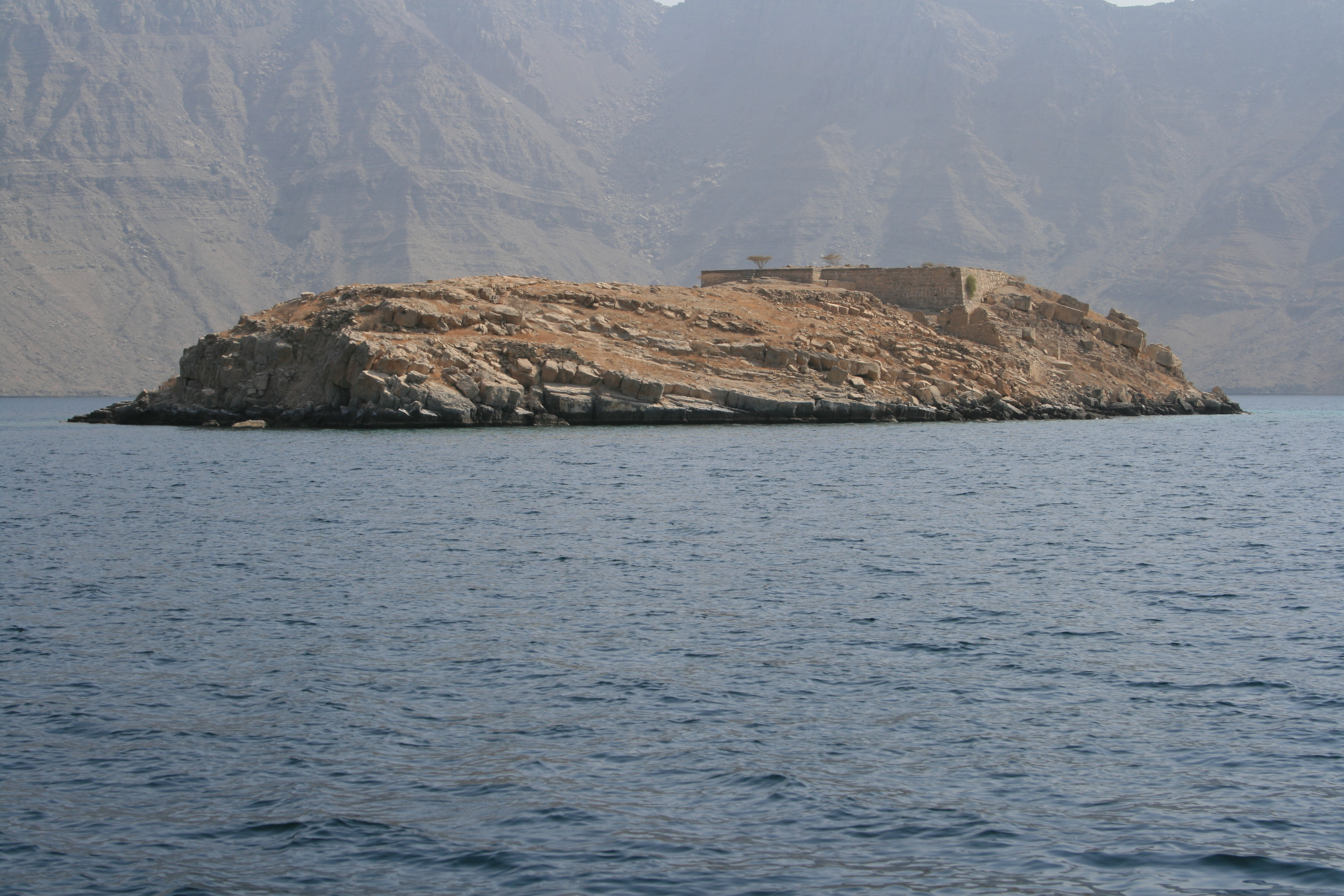

- Location within Oman Telegraph Island (Middle East)

Geography
- Location: Elphinstone Inlet
- Coordinates: 26°11′43″N 56°20′34″E
- Area: 0.144 km^{2} (0.056 sq mi)
- Length: 0.16 km (0.099 mi)
- Width: 0.09 km (0.056 mi)

Administration
- Oman
- Governorate: Musandam
- Province: Khasab

Demographics
- Population: uninhabited

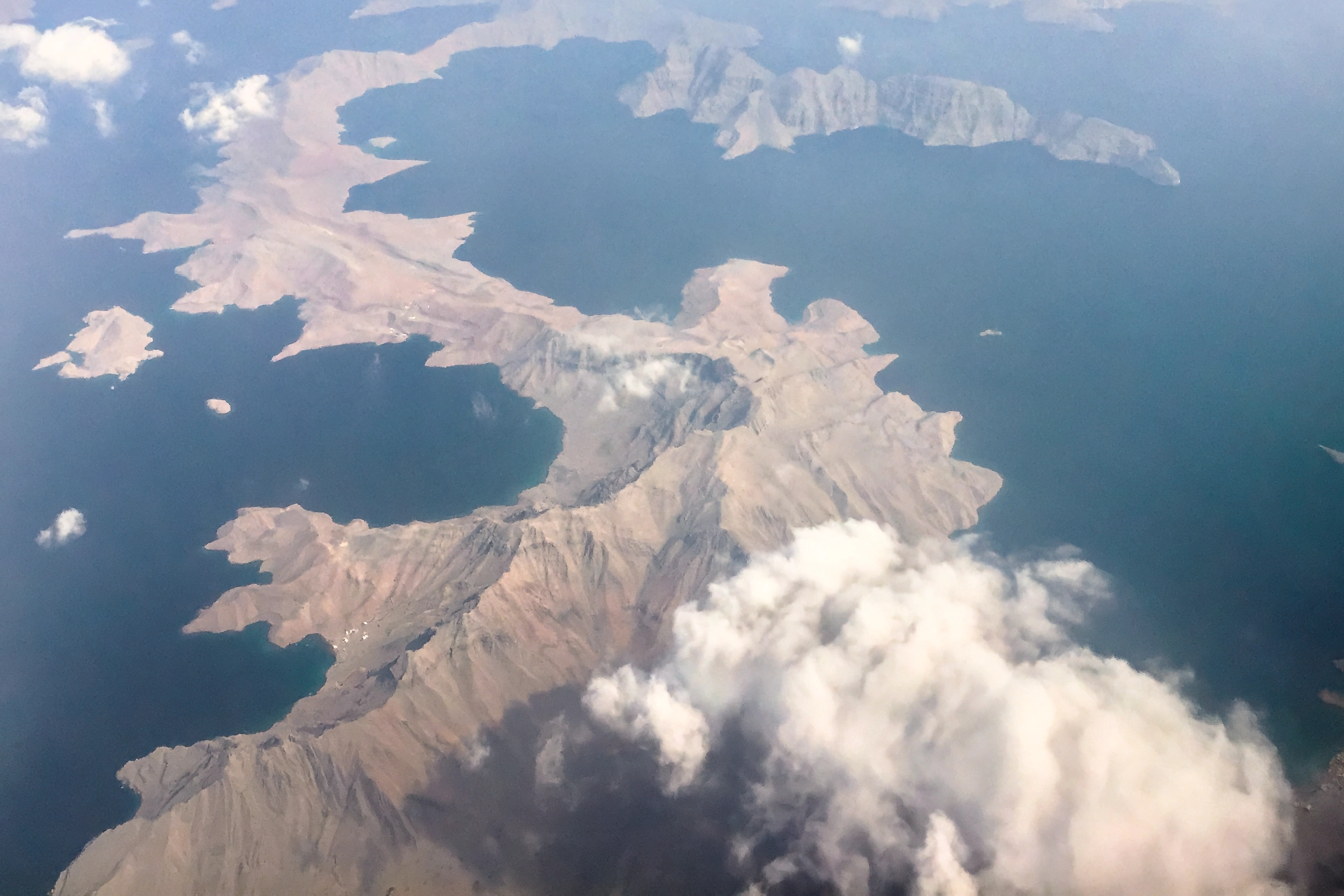
Telegraph Island on the left

Telegraph Island (also known as Arabic: جزيرة تليغراف, Jazīrat al Maqlab, and Şağīr) is located in the Elphinstone Inlet or Khor Ash Sham, the inner inlet of Khasab Bay, less than 400 meters off the shore of the Musandam Peninsula, and less than 500 meters south of much larger but also much lesser known Sham Island, both of which are parts of the Sultanate of Oman. It is 160 meters long, and up to 90 meters wide, yielding an area of 14.4 hectares. The name "Telegraph" comes from the telegraph-cable repeater station built on the island in 1864.

The inlet at the island is surrounded by high mountains, with notable geology in the rock strata which dip downwards under the immense pressures caused by the Arabian tectonic plate meeting (and subducting beneath) the Eurasian Plate. In the 19th century, it was the location of a British repeater station used to boost telegraphic messages along the Persian Gulf submarine cable (see below), which was part of the London to Karachi telegraphic cable. It was not an easy posting for the operators, with the severe summer heat and hostility of local tribes making life extremely uncomfortable. Because of this, the island is, according to some travel agents and journalists, where the expression "go round the bend" comes from, a reference to the heat making British officers desperate to return to civilisation, which meant a voyage around the bend in the Strait of Hormuz back to India.

Today, Telegraph Island is a reminder of the British Empire. Abandoned in the mid-1870s, the island has remained deserted and only the ruins of the repeater station and the operators' quarters can be seen. Tourism has grown in the Persian Gulf region, so the island is regularly visited by dhows carrying tourists to view the ruins and to fish and snorkel in the waters around it.

== Geology of the Musandam Peninsula ==
Telegraph Island is situated in a fjord at the northern end of the Musandam Peninsula, which forms part of the Oman mountain range described by the geologist George Martin Lees as "projecting like a spur into the vitals of Persia" (today's Iran). Being part of the edge of the Arabian tectonic plate, the rock stata are subjected to massive pressure as the plate subducts beneath the Eurasian plate. The result is that Musandam is being pushed downwards at approximately 6 mm (0.24 in) per year at its northernmost point, with spectacular results. Fresh-water springs that once flowed over the land may have become submerged, possibly giving rise to stories of sailors diving into the sea to collect fresh water in leather bags.

== The Persian Gulf Telegraphic Cable ==
=== Background ===
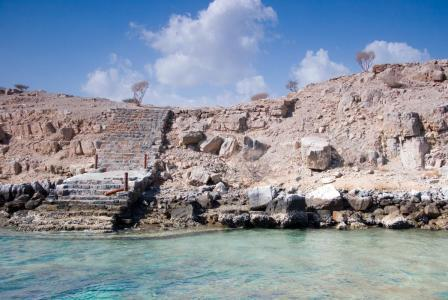
The steps to Telegraph Island

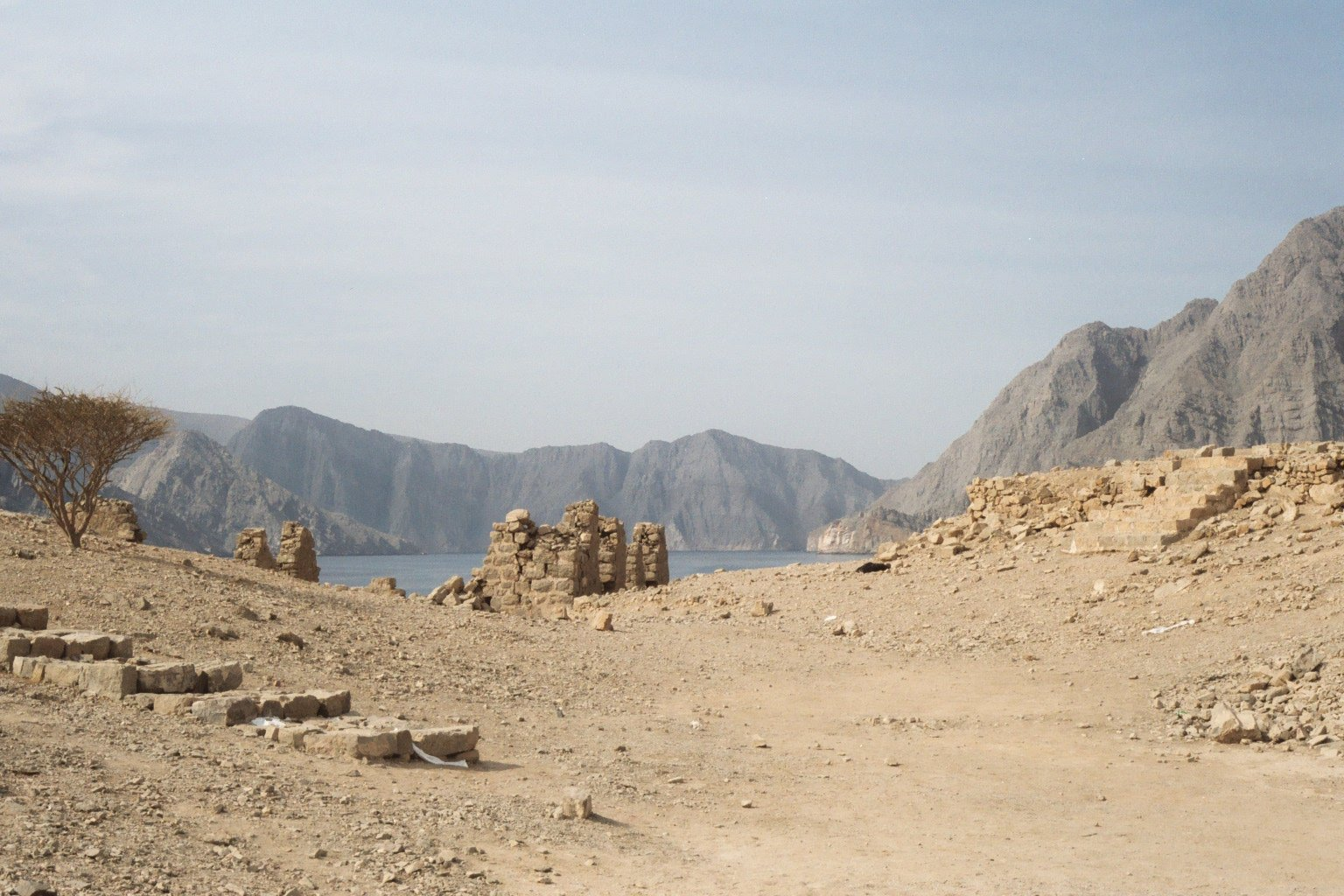
Remains of the repeater station on Telegraph Island

The expansion of the British Empire in the 19th century required a fast and reliable system of communication to enable the British government in London to issue instructions and receive information quickly. The Indian Mutiny of 1857, followed by the annexation of India in 1858, emphasised this need. By 1856, cables had been laid linking Britain with North Africa and the Ottoman Empire. A scheme to lay a cable through Mesopotamia to the head of the Persian Gulf failed when the Turks refused to grant permission.

By 1858, the British government, through grants and subsidies, was actively encouraging schemes to establish a telegraphic link between Britain and India. In 1859, the Red Sea Telegraph Company laid a submarine cable through the Red Sea and Indian Ocean to Bombay. It became apparent that the cable was not sufficiently robust to withstand the conditions, and that too little slack had been built into the cable, leading to breaks in the line. The cable was a failure, and no messages were passed between London and Bombay.

The British government created the Indo-European Telegraph Department in 1862 to connect a telegraphic link between Karachi and lines in the Ottoman Empire. It planned to run the cable along the Makran coast between Fao, Bushire, and Gwadar. A number of local agreements were made with tribal leaders along the proposed route and a cable laid from Karachi as far as Gwadar. However, the Persian government declined to grant permission to extend the line to Ottoman territory. Attention was focused on the Persian Gulf and, following a report by Lieutenant Colonel Patrick Stewart, a decision was taken to lay a cable to Musandam from Gwadar.

=== Laying the cable ===
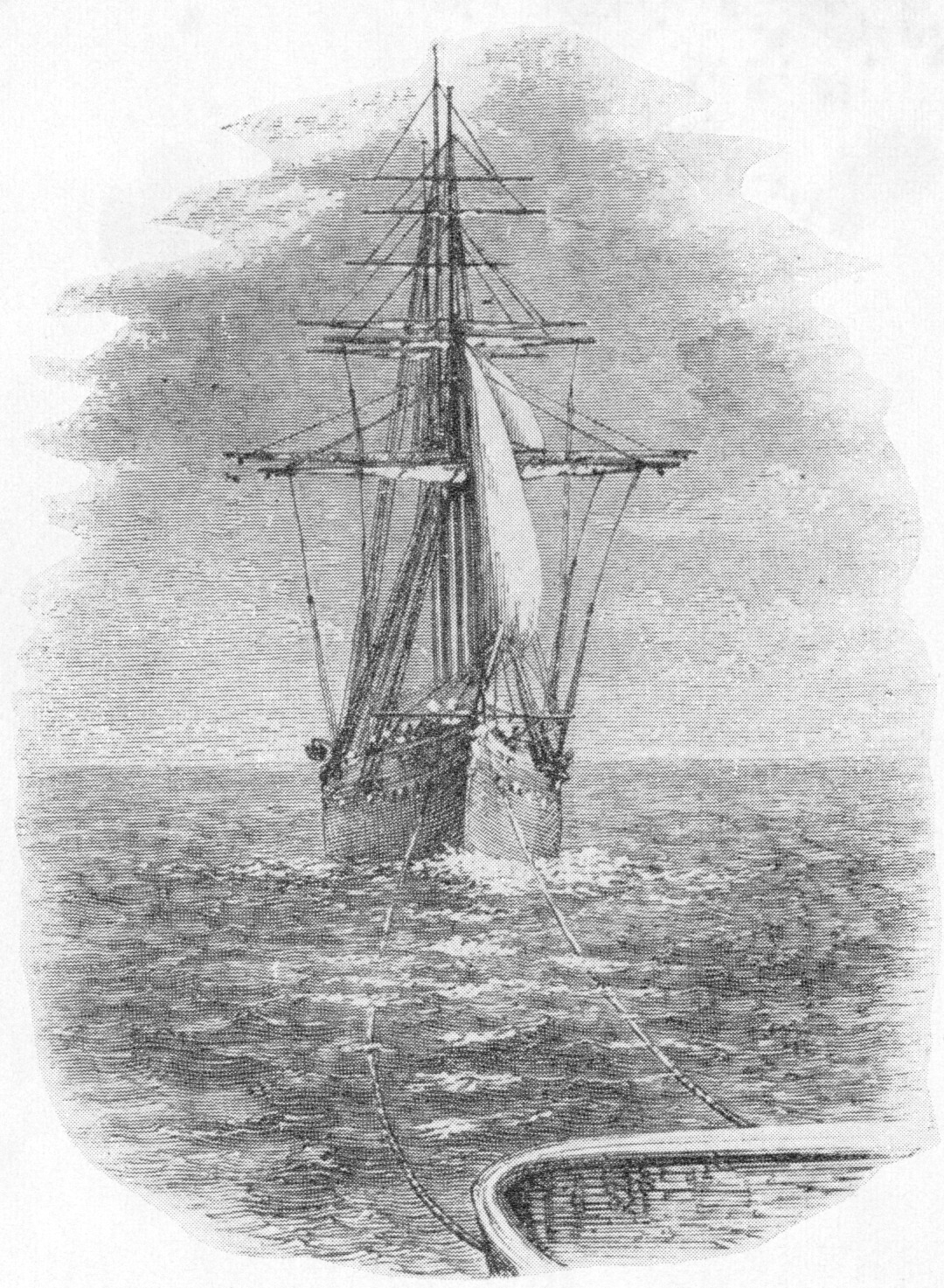
Cable ship Tweed being towed while laying cable between Musandam and Bushire in 1864

In 1864 the Government of India contracted the Gutta Percha Company to manufacture the core. Henley's Telegraph Works was to construct the armouring, and Sir Charles Bright was appointed the consulting engineer. Because telegraph signals tended to fade over distance, it was necessary to build a series of repeater stations along the cable route to boost them, hence the decision to build a repeater station at Musandam. The cable was landed on a small rocky island in the Elphinstone Inlet (Khor Ash Sham) of the Musandam Peninsula. Hence this island became known as Telegraph Island. A repeater station was built on the island, which was about a mile offshore, because of fears about the volatile tribes on the mainland, primarily the Zahuriyeen tribe, who lived on the nearby Maqtab Isthmus. The work of laying the Gwadar to Musandam section took a month to complete.

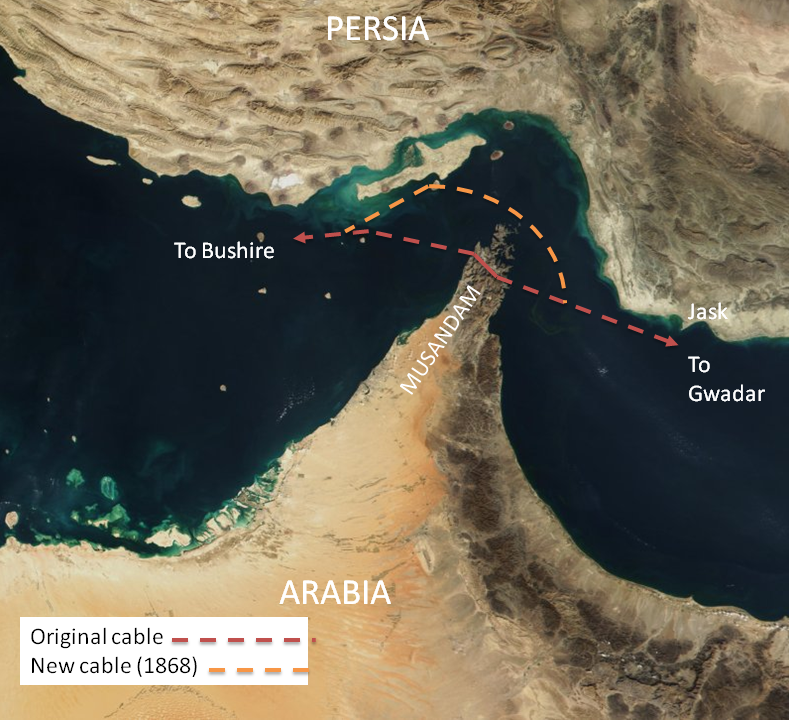
Image showing the approximate route of the Persian Gulf cables

The station at Musandam was fitted with telegraphic equipment by Siemens. There were quarters for the telegraph operators, together with those for the servants and two hulks fitted up for staff who wanted a break from the monotony of living on the island. They had a couple of boats for their leisure time, and regular newspaper deliveries. This, together with the work of maintaining the cable, and visits from steamers to change over staff and bring supplies, it was hoped would keep the staff occupied.

The Musandam to Bushire section was completed on 25 March 1864, and that between Kurrachee and the head of the Gulf at Fao, on 5 April. Unfortunately, the Turks experienced problems in completing the link from Baghdad to Fao, primarily due to attacks by hostile tribes in Mesopotamia, which were only stopped after negotiations with local sheikhs and by stationing guards at close intervals along the line. The through connection was eventually achieved in 1865.

The telegraph station was abandoned in December 1868 when the cable was diverted to Henjam and Jask. In 1870, after a new cable was laid from Bombay to Aden, there was a significant reduction in the use of the Persian Gulf cable.

=== Operation ===
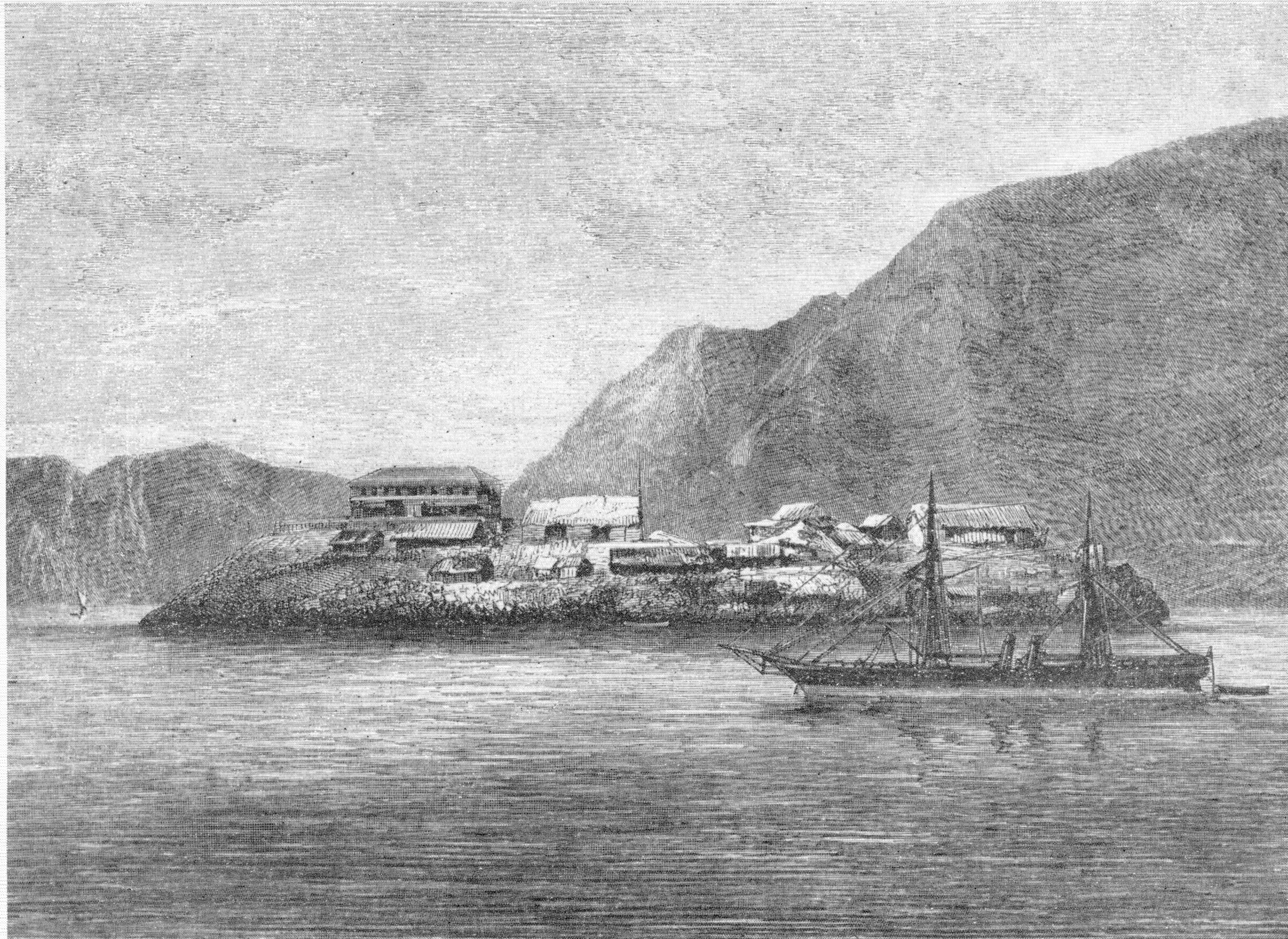
An engraving of Telegraph Island in the 1860s showing the telegraph station

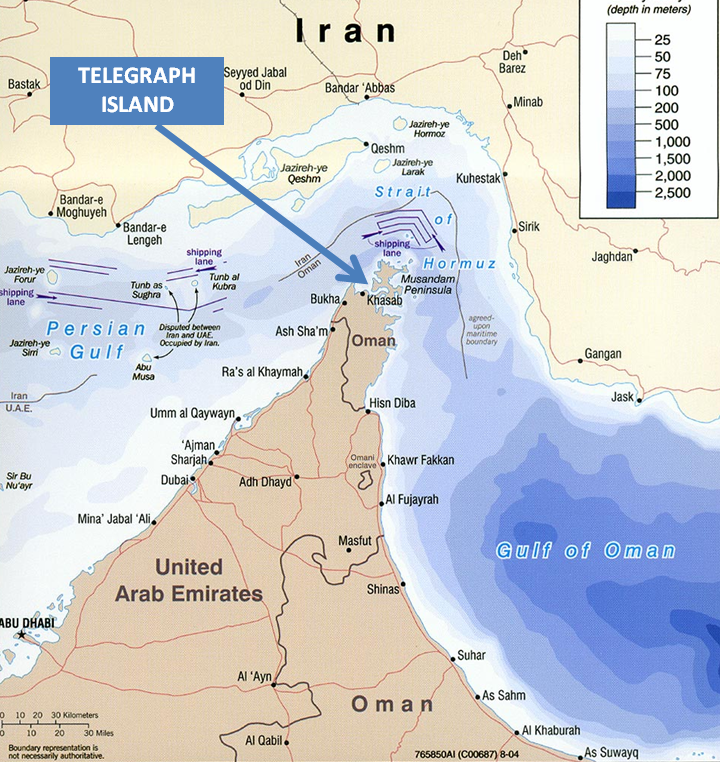

The Persian Gulf cable was never entirely reliable, with interruptions and errors at the repeater stations. A message usually took a minimum of five days to reach London from Karachi. Another problem was the destructive influence of the teredo (a wormlike bivalve mollusk) on the gutta percha insulation of the cables, which was more susceptible to them than the india rubber insulation used on other cables in warm water areas. In 1865, to address these problems, it was planned to run a second line onshore through Persia, and although this line was built, it was abandoned in 1868 because of objections from the Turks who regarded it as unnecessary competition with the Fao to Baghdad line.

After the repeater station had been established on Telegraph Island, it became apparent that the location was unsuitable, with extreme heat making life unbearable for the operators and leading to the death of two in two years. The opposition of the tribesmen, although at times subdued, was never overcome entirely with the result that it was constantly necessary to have a gun boat in the vicinity of the island.

After it was evacuated, Telegraph Island remained an important strategic point, as evidenced by the decision of the British Government in 1904 to erect flagpoles there. However, an agreement could not be reached about which flag to fly – the Union Jack or the Blue Ensign of the Royal India Marine. The former would imply sovereignty over the island, which Britain did not have, while the latter might bring responsibility on the British to defend it, which the government did not want. It was eventually decided to fly neither flag, and all the flagpoles were removed except one. The flagpole could not be seen from the open sea but is not clear whether officials in London ever appreciated this fact.

== Tourism ==
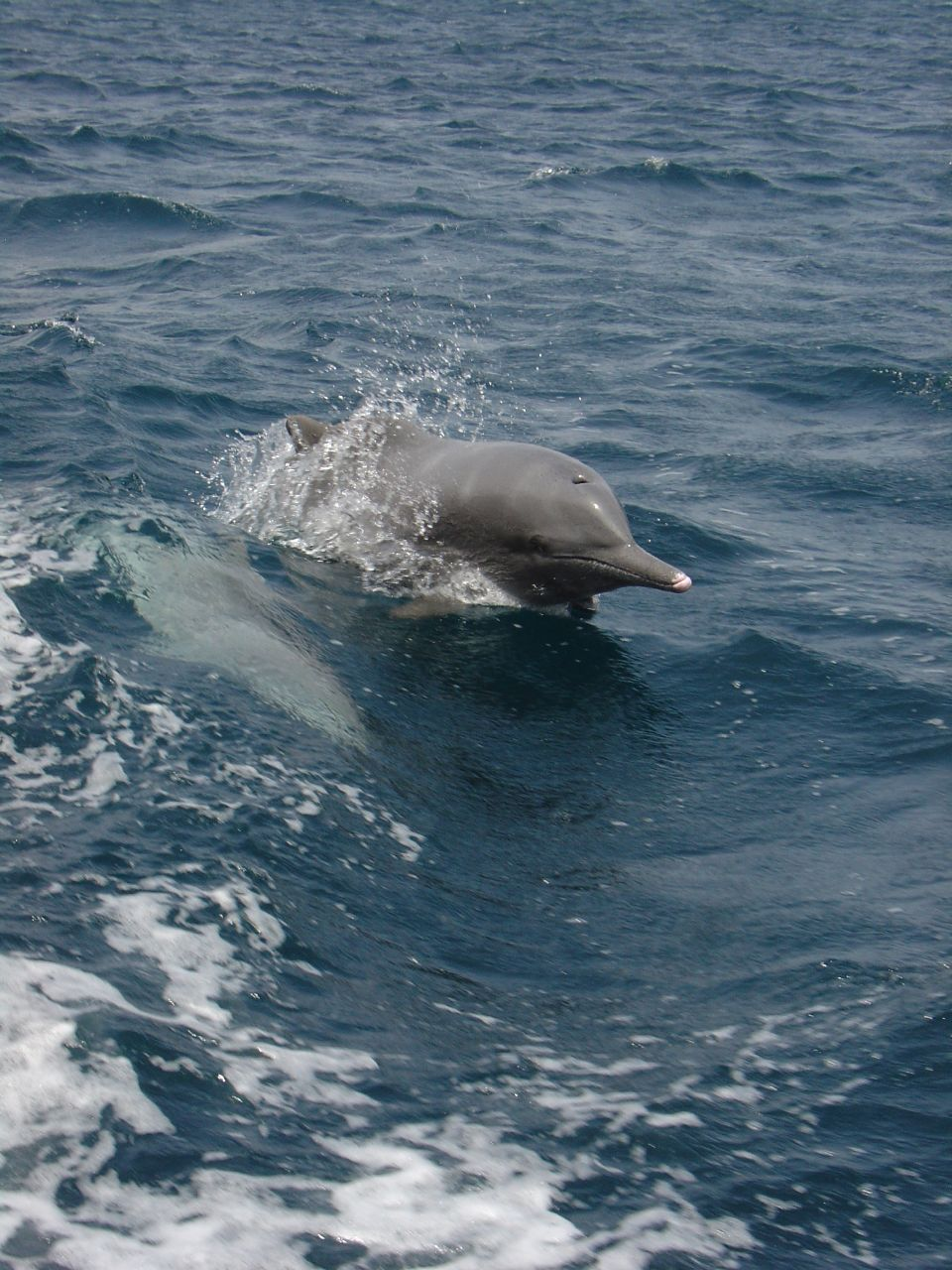
A dolphin alongside a dhow in Musandam

The Musandam Peninsula is a popular tourist destination, with modern hotels in and around the town of Khasab and boat trips to the Elphinstone Inlet. Tourist dhows run day trips to Telegraph Island, tying up beside the island for a few hours while visitors can climb up the steps and visit the crumbling ruins of the repeater station and operators' quarters. However, changes in the tide of two to three feet (0.61 to 0.91 m) can make it difficult to land passengers at certain times of day. Visitors may also swim and snorkel in the surrounding waters. The inlet is calm and sheltered, and it is possible to see dolphins swimming alongside the dhows that make their way to and from Khasab.

Telegraph Island is currently undergoing a major tourism development project to build a multi-purpose hall, marine platform and mountain walkway.

== Cultural references ==
In an episode of the fantasy television show Warehouse 13, titled "Around the Bend", aired on the Syfy Channel on 10 August 2010, a fictional military telegraph from the island is recognised by a character as causing "violent insanity". Agent Lattimer goes "around the bend" after tapping its lever.

== See also ==
- List of islands in the Persian Gulf
