= Port of Khasab =

Port of Khasab Location in Oman

- Interactive map of Port of Khasab Location in Oman

Location
- Country: Oman
- Location: Khasab, Musandam Governorate
- Coordinates: 26°12′12″N 56°14′58″E

Details
- Owned by: Ministry of Transport and Communications, Government of Oman
- Type of harbour: Harbour

Port of Khasab is situated in the Musandam Governorate of Oman.
