= Bukha =

Bukha بُخَاء
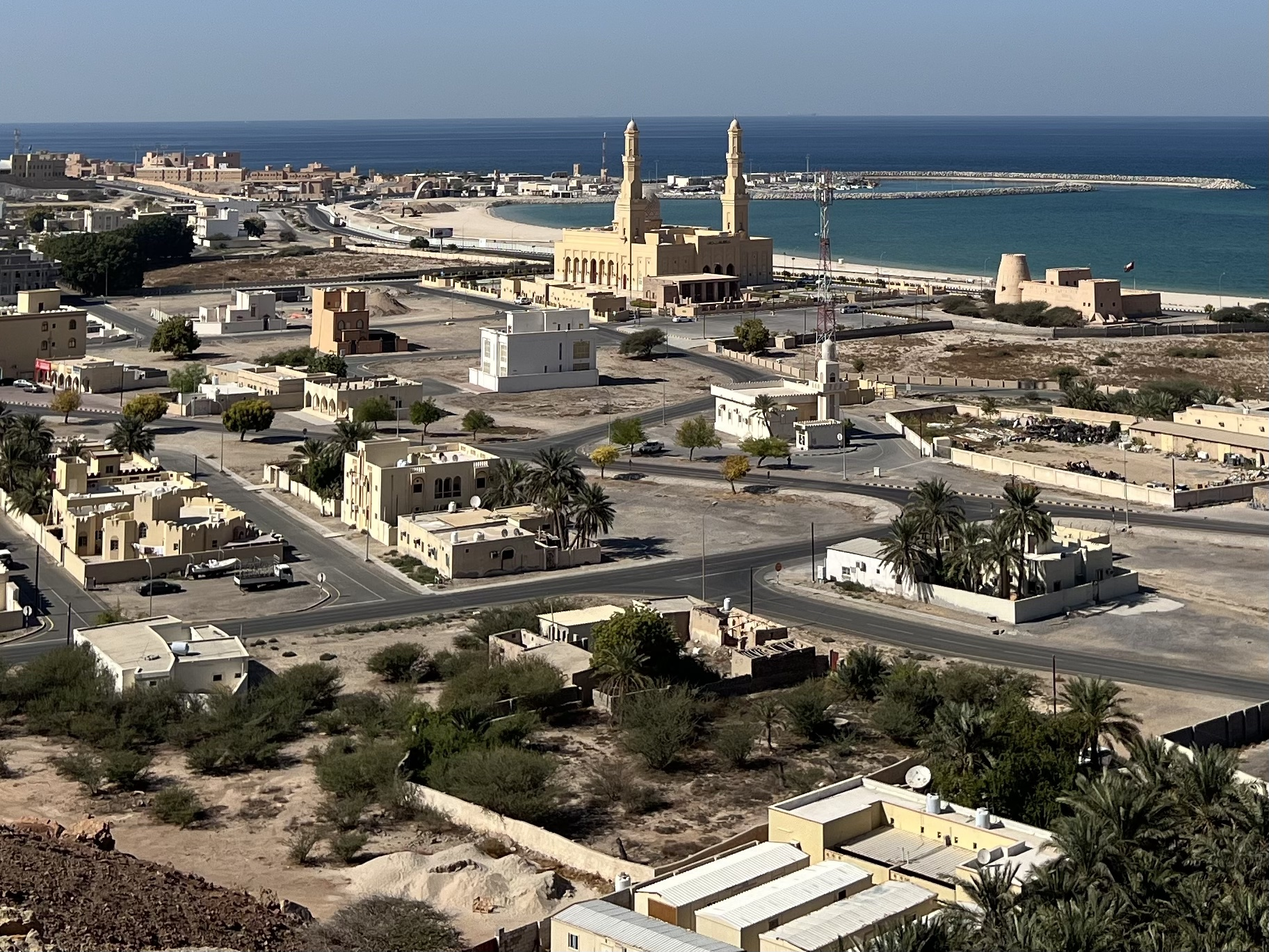
- Bukha on the Musandam Peninsula

- Location in Oman Location in Persian Gulf
- Coordinates: 26°8′35″N 56°9′11″E
- Country: Oman
- Governorate: Musandam
- Province: Bukha
- Elevation: 0 m (0 ft)

Bukhāʾ (Arabic: بُخَاء, romanized: Bukhāʾ) is a Wilayat and town in the Muhafazah of Musandam in the Sultanate of Oman. It is located in the southwestern side of Musandam, overlooking the Persian Gulf. It is bordered to the east by the Wilayat of Khasab and to the west by the United Arab Emirates. Its population centers are about 22 localities, including Bukha, Al-Jadi, Ghumda, and Al-Jeri.

== Climate ==
Bukha, which is 0 metres/feet above sea level, has a subtropical desert climate (BWh). The district's average annual temperature is -1.44% lower than Oman's averages at 27.76 °C (81.97 °F). 12.47 millimetres (or 0.49 inches) of precipitation fall on Bukha yearly, and there are 21.67 wet days (5.94% of the time). A normal day in Bukha in April will have an average temperature of 76 °F (24 °C), with a high of 86 °F (30 °C) .July is the hottest month, with daily highs of 98 °F (37 °C) and lows of 88 °F (31 °C). January is the coldest month of the year, with highs of 73 °F (23 °C) and lows of 67 °F (19 °C) on most days.

Bukha has developed significantly over the past decades with the arrival of the modern coastal road, as can be seen when comparing a picture of Musandam from 2004.

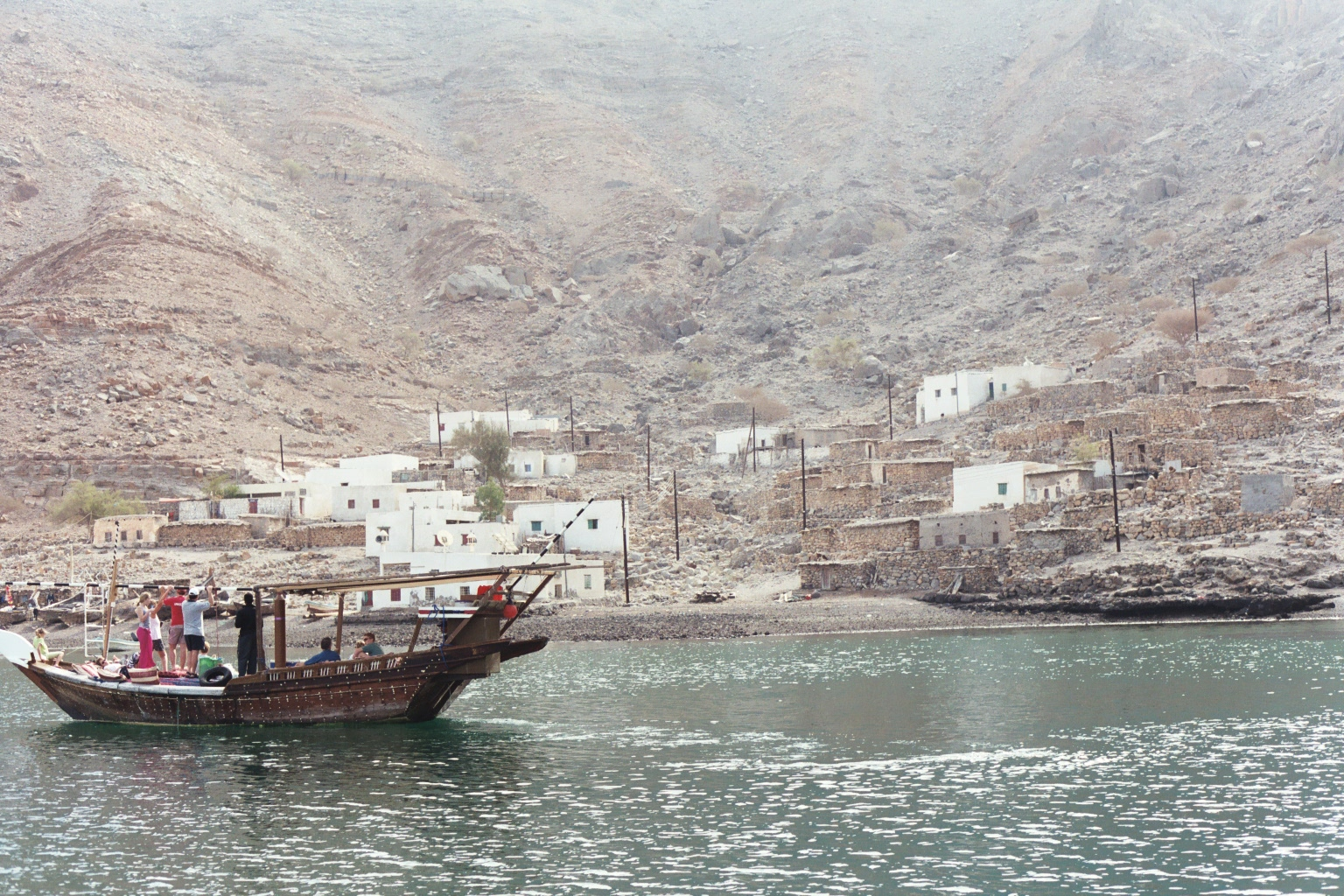
The village of Bukha on the Musandam Peninsula in 2004

== Crafts and traditional industries ==
The production of dates, citrus fruits, and other fruits, as well as the making of tiny fishing boats, fishing nets, and handicrafts, are among the most significant traditional crafts and enterprises in it.

== Tourist attractions ==
=== Natural attractions ===
The state is plain and rugged in nature, with water springs like Ain Al-Thawwara near the hamlet of Al-Jadi and mountainous caves with more than 16 caves. On its coasts are coral reefs, and seabirds and black turtles frequently inhabit them.

=== Archaeological sites ===
- Al-Bilad Fort: One of the most notable historical structures, it is situated in the midst of the Wilayat and directly faces the beach in the Musandam Governorate's Bukha Wilayat. Sheikh Suleiman bin Muhammad Al Malik Al-Shehhi constructed this fort around 1250 AD, during the rule of Imam Saif bin Sultan Al-Ya'rubi. This fort is recognized by its tower, which is situated in the southwest corner of the fort. In 1989 A.D, it was renovated and made accessible to visitors so they may admire the exquisite architectural design.
- Jeddah archaeological site: It contains traces of stone dwellings.
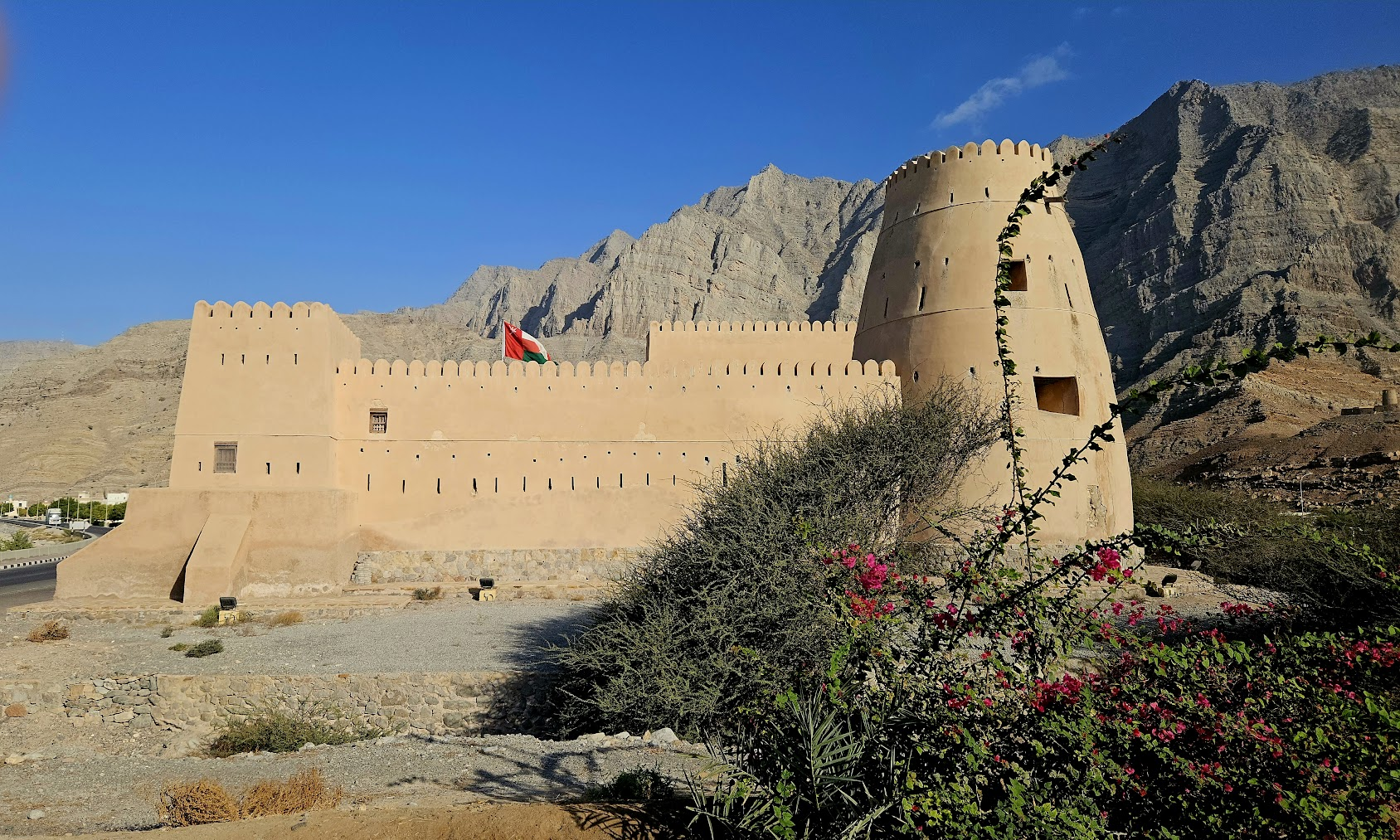
  Bukha Forts
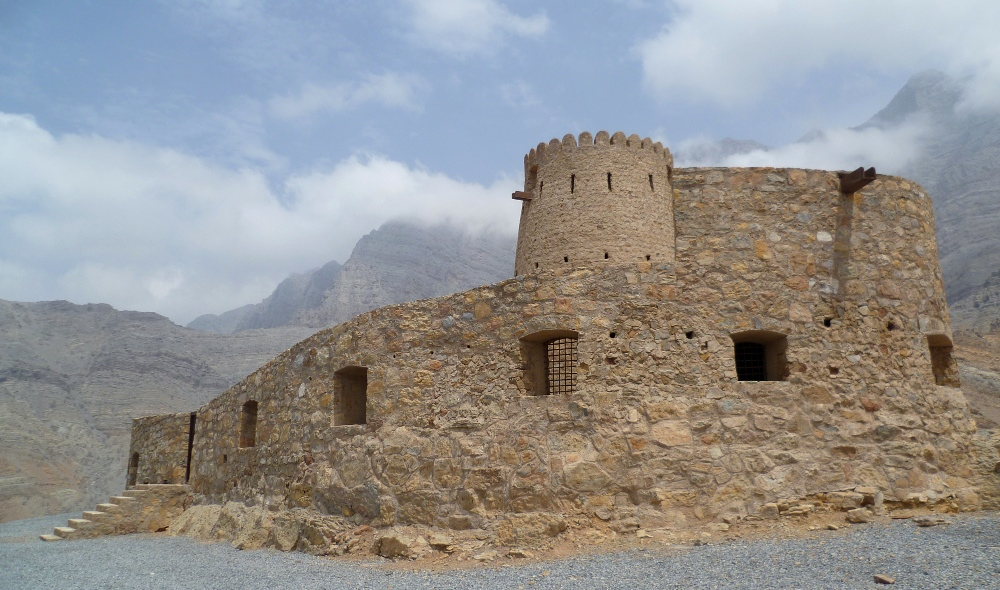
  Al-Bilad Fort
- Bukha Fort: The strategic location of Bukha Fort in the fishing community of Bukha adds to its beauty as the sea is just in front of it in a lovely crescent harbor and the high mountains rise majestically above it. The castle was erected by the Portuguese in the sixteenth century, has had numerous repairs and reconstructions since then, and has been an essential part of defense and protection throughout the Sultanate's history.
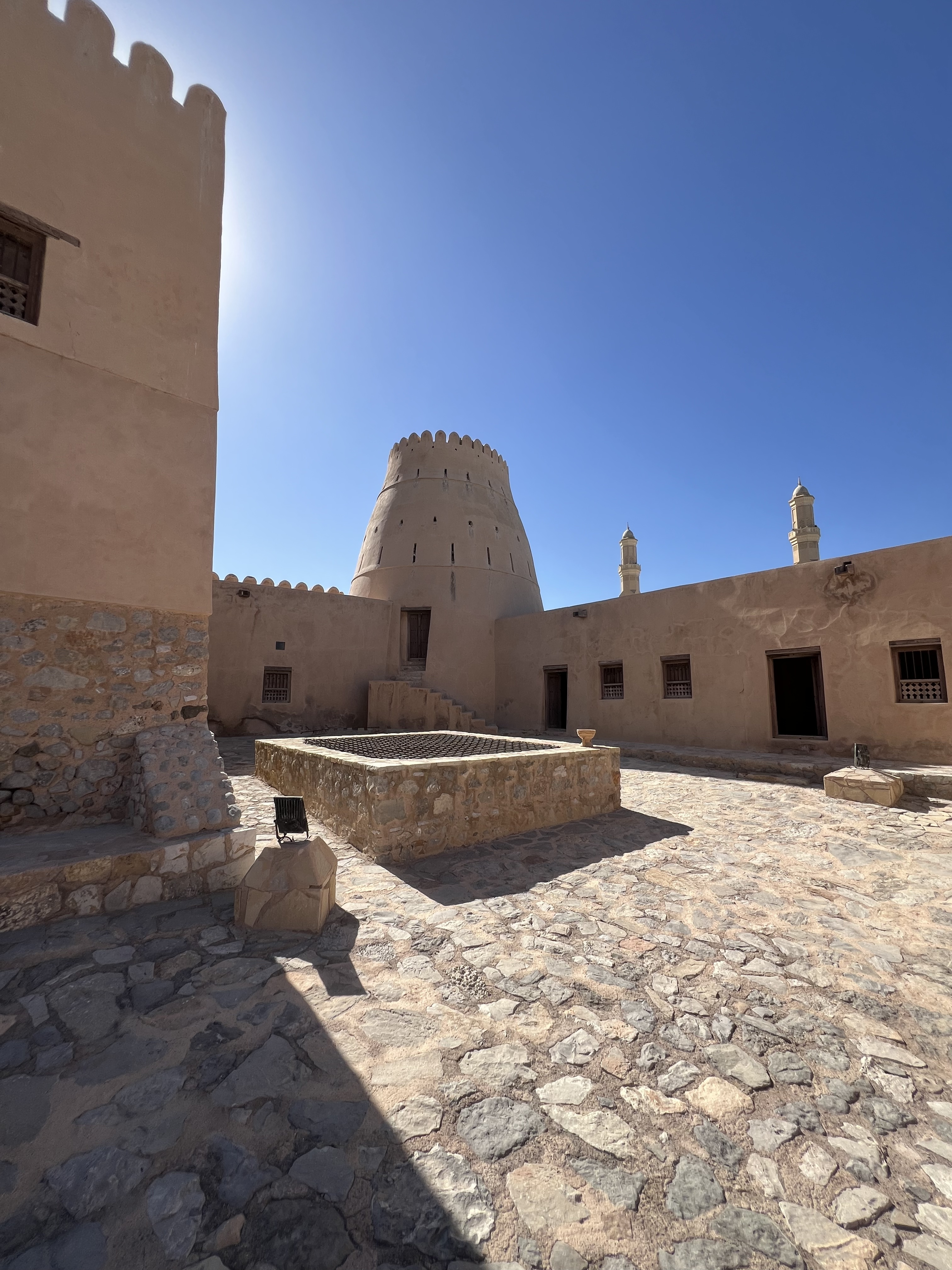
  Bukha Fort
- Al-Faslah Castle
- Fortress tower
- Square straw tower
- Square tower architecture

== Sister towns ==
- Weʽa, Djibouti

== See also ==
- Dibba Al-Baya
- Madha
- Khasab
- Kumzar
- Ras Al Khaimah in the UAE
