= Khasab =

Khasab خصب
- Town
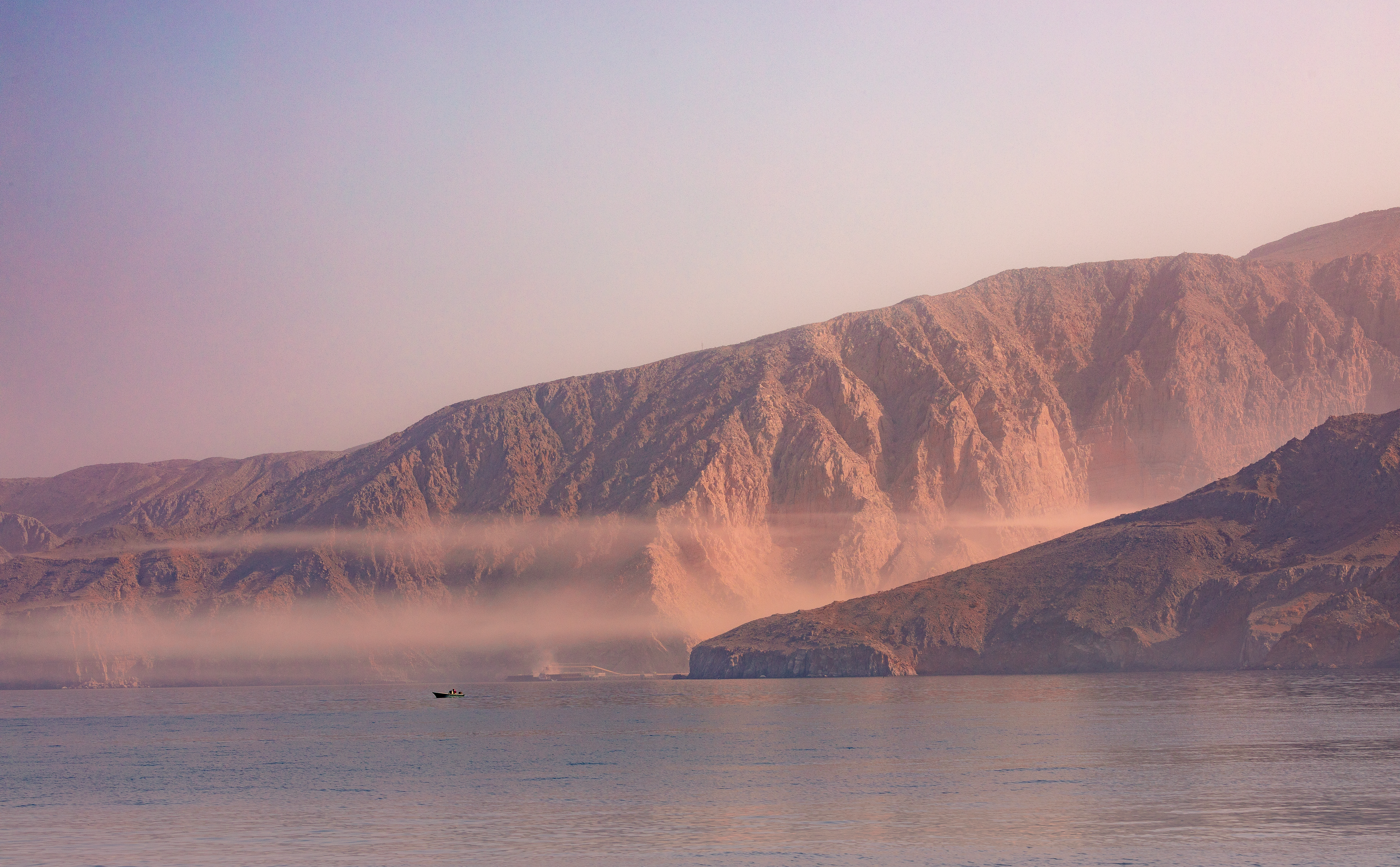
- View of Khasab
- Interactive map of Khasab
- Location in Oman Khasab (Persian Gulf)
- Coordinates: 26°11′N 56°15′E
- Country: Oman
- Governorate: Musandam Governorate

Population (2020)
  - Total: 21,651
- Time zone: UTC+4 (GST)

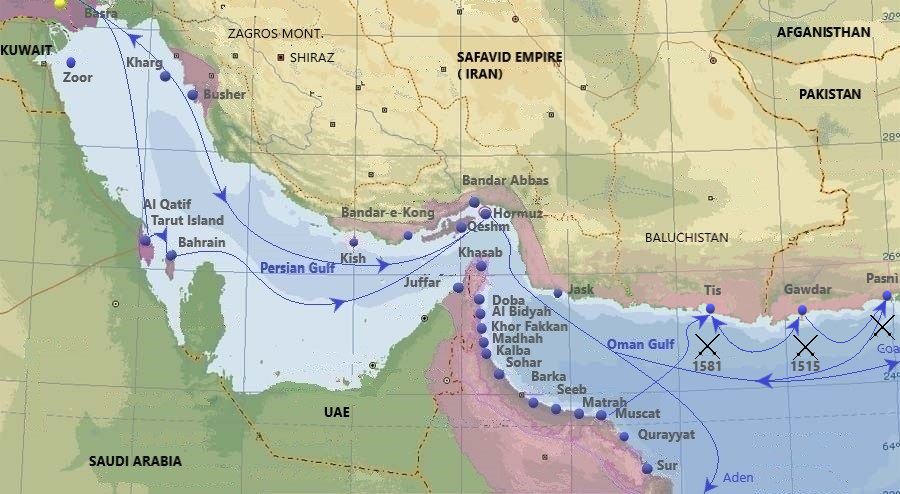
Purple - Portuguese in the Persian Gulf in the 16th and 17th centuries. Main cities, ports, and routes.

Khasab (Arabic: خَصَب, romanized: Ḫaṣab) is a town and capital of the Musandam Governorate which is an exclave of Oman bordering the United Arab Emirates at the tip of the Musandam Peninsula by the Strait of Hormuz. It has been dubbed the "Norway of Arabia" because of its extensive fjord-like craggy inlets and desolate mountainscapes.

The town is surrounded by the northern mountains of the Western Hajar Range. Khasab has a fully functional hospital and several hotels, beaches, and parks across the city. The city's population is dominated by ethnic Omanis from the mainland. Khasab also has a fort which is known as Khasab Fort. The seaport is dominated by the dhows which take tourists for a cruise across the natural, dry "fjords".

The town is a popular tourist spot for residents of the UAE as the Khasab–Tibat road provides access to the town from the UAE by connecting with the E11 Highway on the UAE side. The town can also be accessed by the ferry, which is maintained by the Government. The ferries are modern.

== History ==
The Portuguese occupied Khasab at the beginning of the 16th century, and they later built a fort to protect the town at the beginning of the 17th century, at the height of their naval presence in the region. The natural harbour gave shelter from rough seas. Unlike many forts, which were built on high ground for defensive purposes, Khasab Fort was designed as a supply point for dates and water for Portuguese ships sailing through the strait. Today, Khasab is protected from floods by three large dams.

== Economy ==
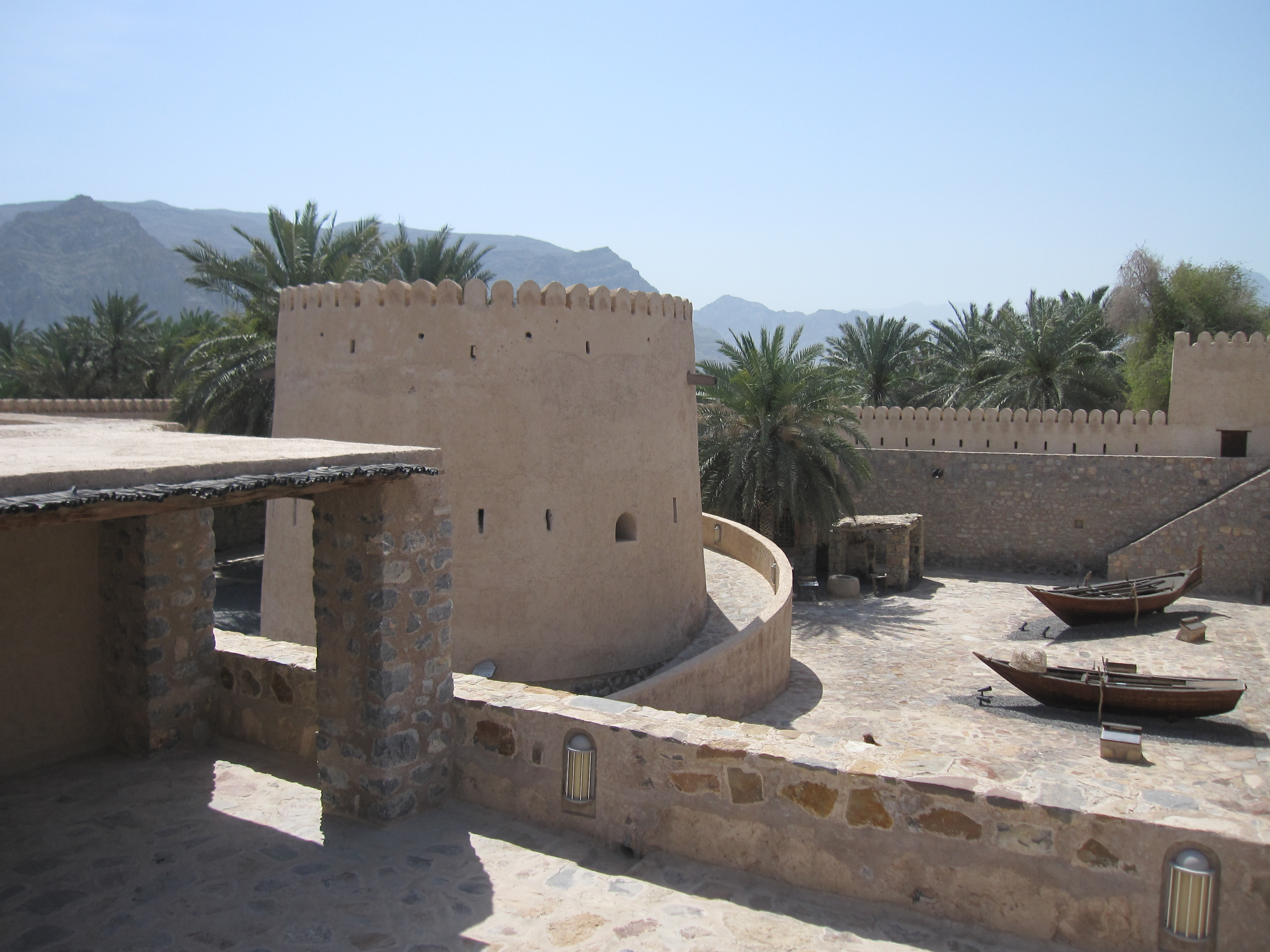
Khasab Castle

Access to the area by land was virtually impossible until a modern coast road was built, which allows fast access from the United Arab Emirates, making Khasab a popular weekend destination for people living in the Emirates. The new road also allows access to the village of Tawi, where prehistoric drawings of boats, animals and warriors can be seen in the rock face. Khasab has several modern shopping areas with imported Iranian goods and locally created pottery, and a few hotels, including the Khasab Hotel, Atana Musandam Resort and Atana Khasab Hotel, which sits on a cliff overlooking the Persian Gulf.

Khasab has an interesting trading position, which hinges on its proximity to Iran. Iranians export sheep and goats to the Port of Khasab, from where the animals are trucked to the United Arab Emirates and Saudi Arabia. On their return trip to Iran, the sailors load their boats up with electronic goods and American cigarettes, arriving in Khasab after sunrise and leaving before sunset to conform with Omani immigration laws. Since the trading is illegal under Iranian law, they must avoid Iran's coastguard, as well as other ships in the busy waters of the Strait of Hormuz. The crossing is hazardous since the vessels, piled high either with livestock or with numerous boxes, must avoid the path of the scores of oil tankers that pass through the Strait in a transverse direction daily. Recent increases in the United States' sanctions against Iran have increased the amount of smuggling done through Khasab.

=== Tourism ===
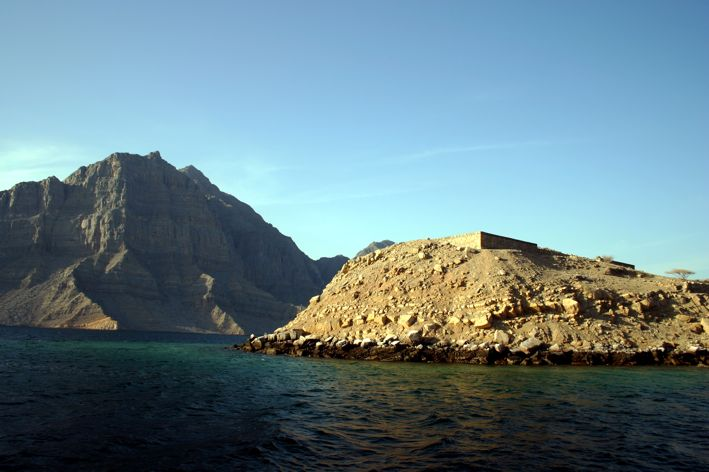
Telegraph Island. Dhow tours from Khasab take visitors to these remains of the former British telegraph station.

Dhows from Khasab take tourists on trips to view the dolphins common in the waters around the Musandam, as well as to visit the fjords and Telegraph Island. For a short time (between 1865 and 1868) Telegraph Island was the site of a staffed telegraph repeater station on the cable section between Bahrain and Bombay; it is currently undergoing redevelopment.

Khasab is the site of the world's longest overwater zip line, at 1.8km long and speeds of up to 80kph.

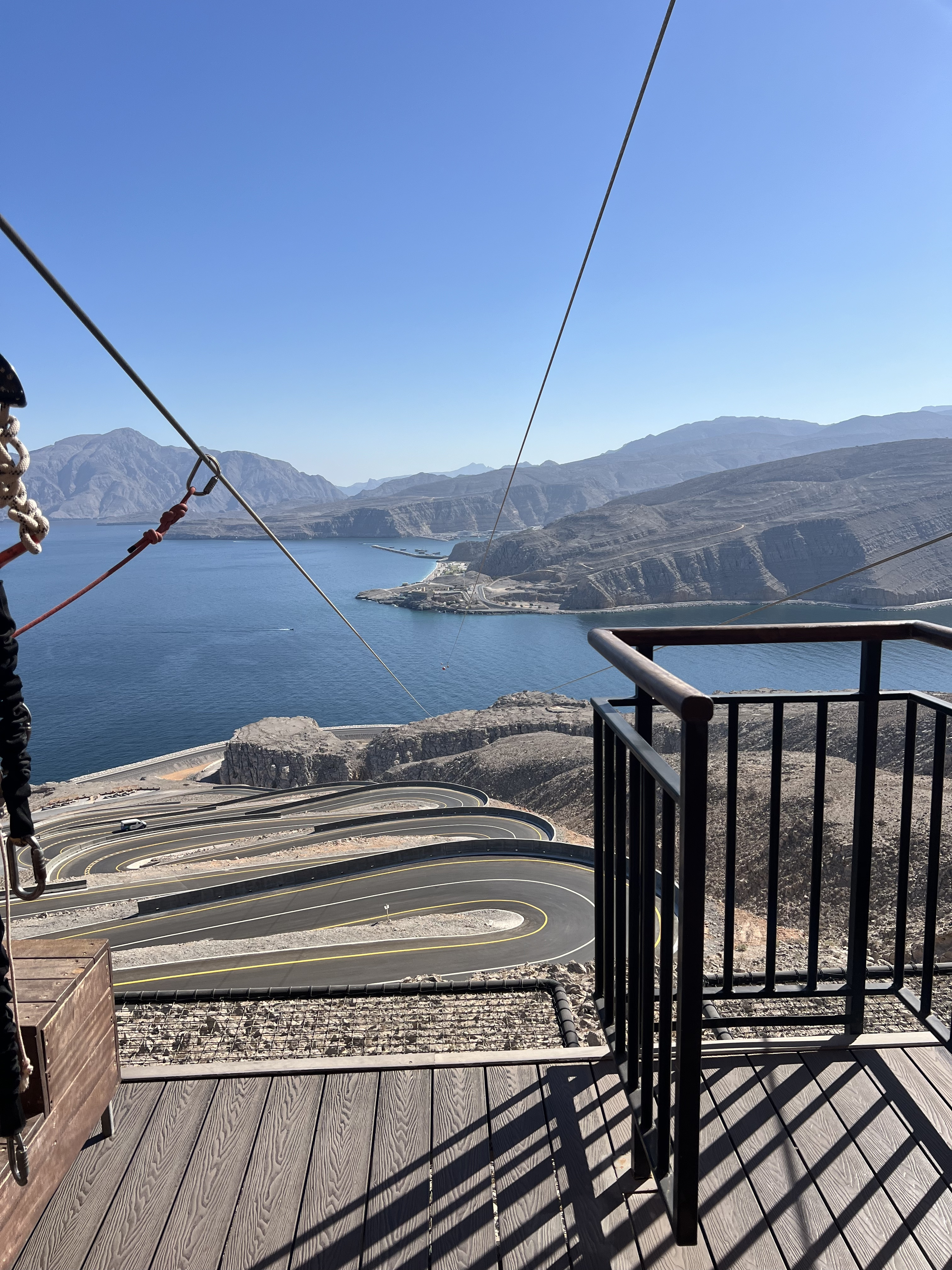
Longest overwater zip-line in the world at 1.8km

== Climate ==
Khasab has a hot desert climate (Köppen climate classification BWh) with very hot and humid summers and mild winters. Precipitation is low, and mostly falls from December to March.

On 27 June 2011, Khasab Airport recorded the world calendar day highest minimum temperature of 41.2 °C (106.2 °F), until Death Valley, California, United States, broke the record by 0.5 °C (0.9 °F) to record 41.7 °C (107.1 °F) on 12 July 2012. On 17 June 2017, Khasab recorded the highest night-time low temperature of 44.2 °C (111.6 °F).

Khasab

Climate chart (precipitation, max. and min. temperature)
| J | F | M | A | M | J | J | A | S | O | N | D |
| 45 24 17 | 49 26 18 | 46 30 22 | 8.8 36 27 | 1.9 40 31 | 0 41 33 | 0.8 41 34 | 0 41 33 | 0 39 31 | 0 36 28 | 2.9 31 23 | 32 26 18 |
- █ Average max. and min. temperatures in °C
- █ Precipitation totals in mm
Imperial conversion
| J | F | M | A | M | J | J | A | S | O | N | D |
| 1.8 76 62 | 1.9 79 65 | 1.8 86 71 | 0.3 96 80 | 0.1 104 87 | 0 106 91 | 0 107 93 | 0 106 92 | 0 102 88 | 0 97 82 | 0.1 87 73 | 1.3 80 65 |
- █ Average max. and min. temperatures in °F
- █ Precipitation totals in inches

Climate data for (Khasab Airport) (1991–2020 normals and extremes 2005–2022)
| Month | Jan | Feb | Mar | Apr | May | Jun | Jul | Aug | Sep | Oct | Nov | Dec | Year |
|---|---|---|---|---|---|---|---|---|---|---|---|---|---|
| Record high °C (°F) | 30.8 (87.4) | 32.0 (89.6) | 37.5 (99.5) | 43.0 (109.4) | 46.2 (115.2) | 49.0 (120.2) | 47.7 (117.9) | 47.5 (117.5) | 44.0 (111.2) | 41.4 (106.5) | 36.0 (96.8) | 31.0 (87.8) | 49.0 (120.2) |
| Mean daily maximum °C (°F) | 24.3 (75.7) | 26.0 (78.8) | 30.0 (86.0) | 35.7 (96.3) | 39.9 (103.8) | 41.3 (106.3) | 41.4 (106.5) | 41.0 (105.8) | 39.0 (102.2) | 36.2 (97.2) | 30.7 (87.3) | 26.4 (79.5) | 34.3 (93.8) |
| Daily mean °C (°F) | 20.7 (69.3) | 22.3 (72.1) | 25.8 (78.4) | 31.1 (88.0) | 35.4 (95.7) | 36.8 (98.2) | 37.5 (99.5) | 37.1 (98.8) | 35.0 (95.0) | 32.1 (89.8) | 26.7 (80.1) | 22.4 (72.3) | 30.2 (86.4) |
| Mean daily minimum °C (°F) | 16.6 (61.9) | 18.3 (64.9) | 21.6 (70.9) | 26.8 (80.2) | 30.7 (87.3) | 32.5 (90.5) | 33.7 (92.7) | 33.4 (92.1) | 31.3 (88.3) | 27.9 (82.2) | 22.7 (72.9) | 18.3 (64.9) | 26.2 (79.1) |
| Record low °C (°F) | 10.5 (50.9) | 10.0 (50.0) | 10.0 (50.0) | 15.5 (59.9) | 21.5 (70.7) | 25.0 (77.0) | 23.8 (74.8) | 27.0 (80.6) | 22.0 (71.6) | 16.0 (60.8) | 12.0 (53.6) | 8.4 (47.1) | 8.4 (47.1) |
| Average precipitation mm (inches) | 44.8 (1.76) | 49.1 (1.93) | 46.3 (1.82) | 8.8 (0.35) | 1.9 (0.07) | 0.0 (0.0) | 0.8 (0.03) | 0.0 (0.0) | 0.0 (0.0) | 0.0 (0.0) | 2.9 (0.11) | 32.1 (1.26) | 186.7 (7.33) |
| Average relative humidity (%) | 63 | 66 | 62 | 53 | 60 | 63 | 66 | 70 | 69 | 63 | 61 | 62 | 63 |
Source 1: NOAA (precipitation and humidity 1961–1990)
Source 2: Starlings Roost Weather

== Gallery ==
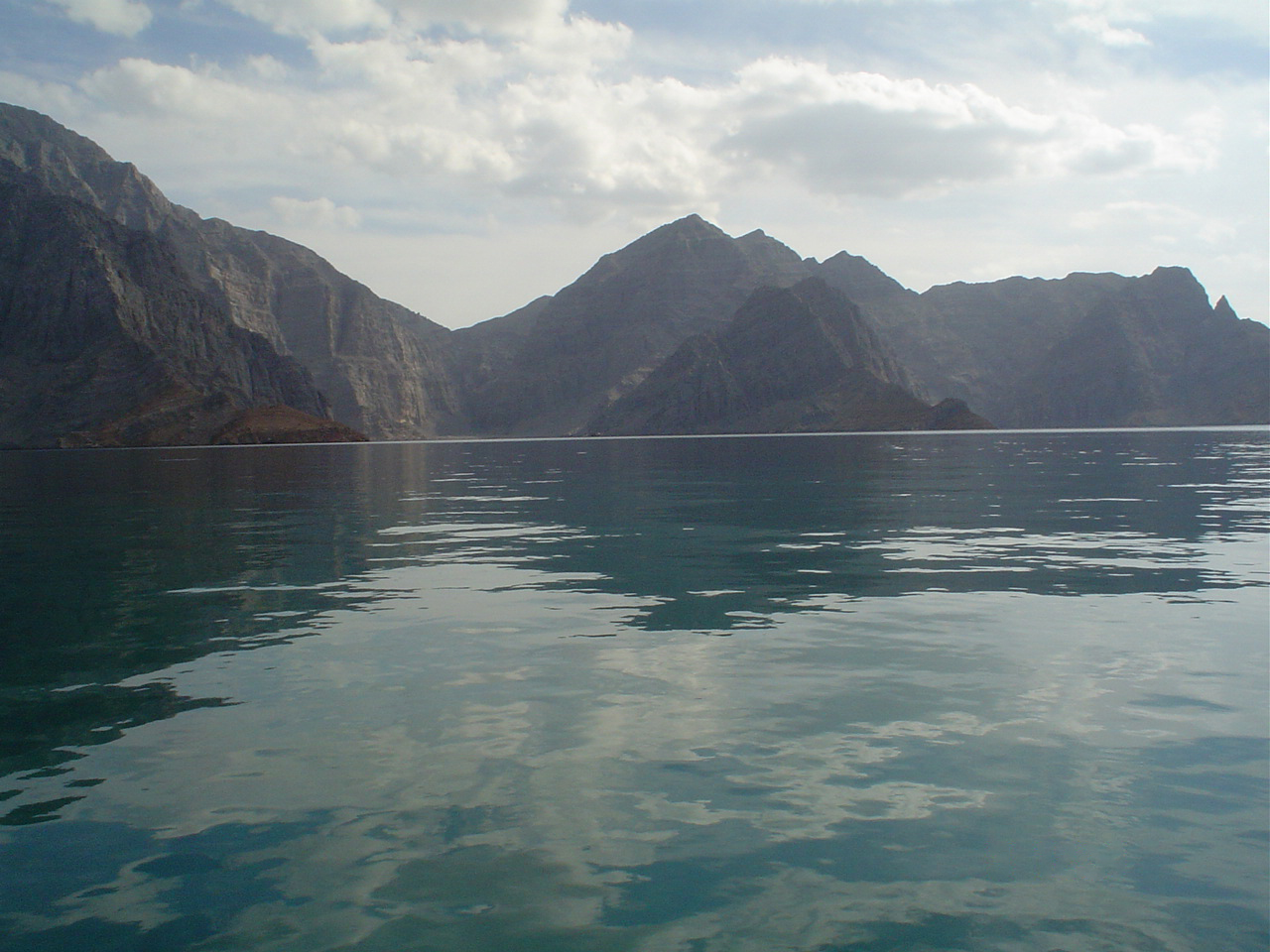

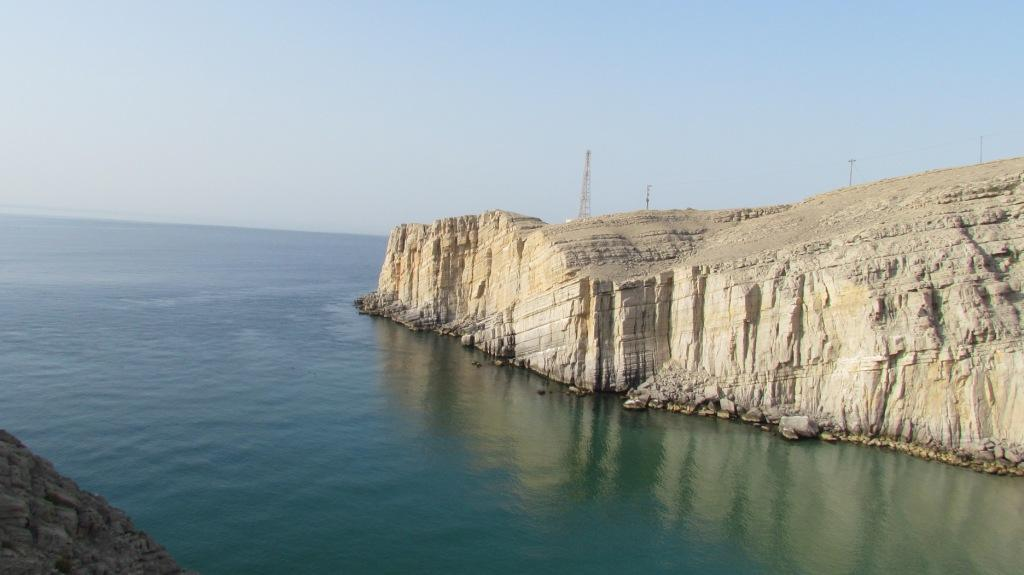

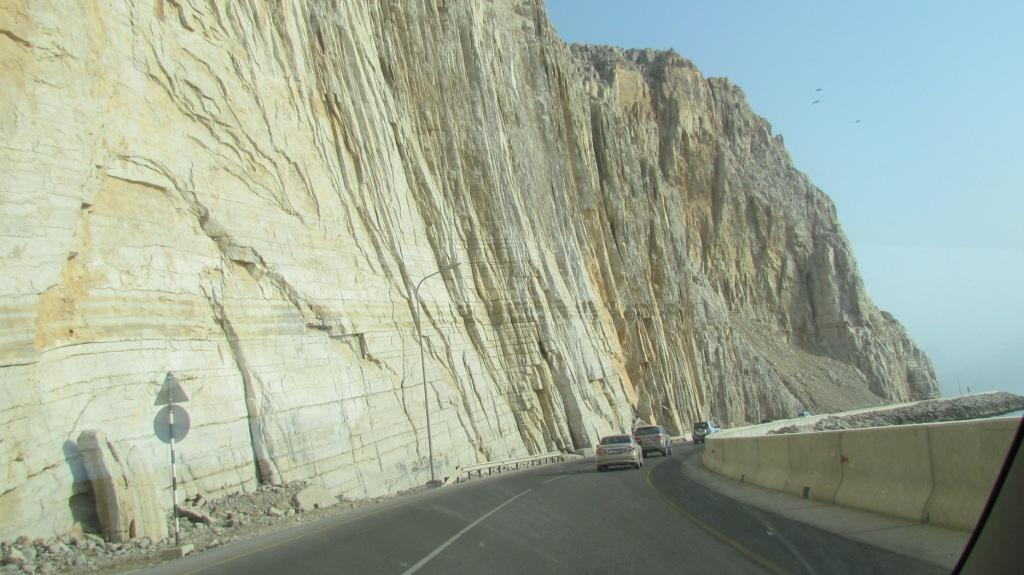

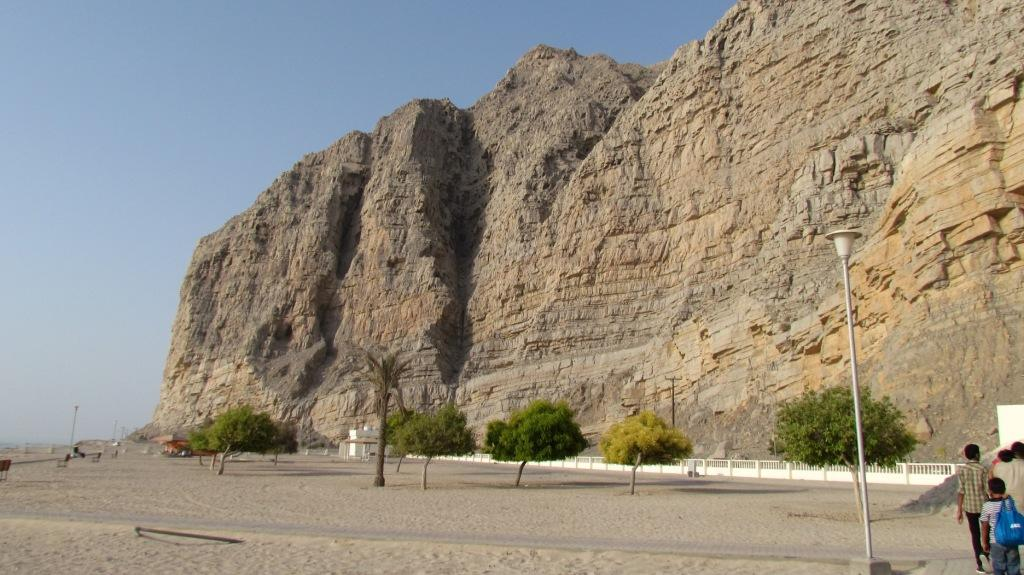

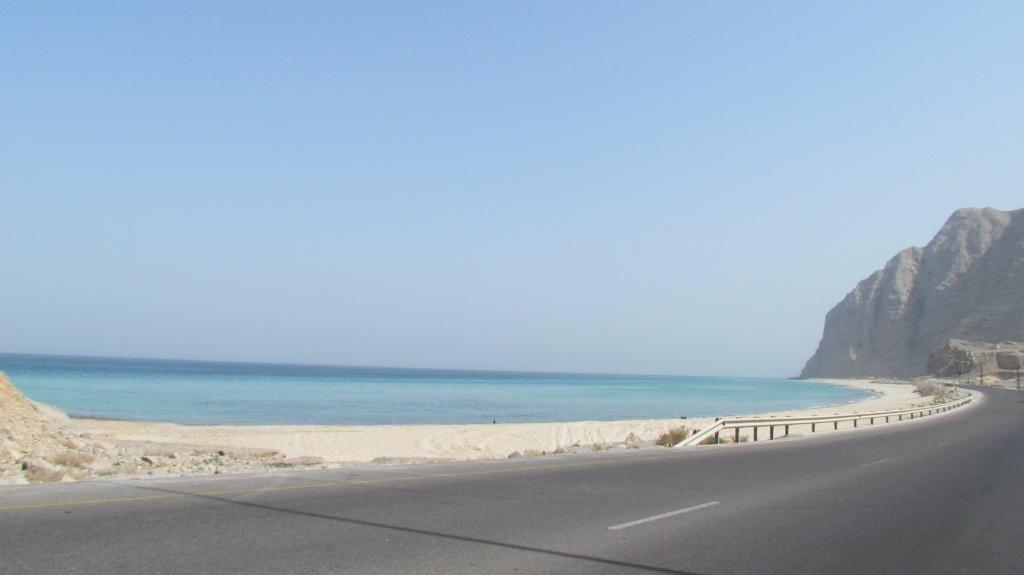
A picture of the Khasab Coastal Road

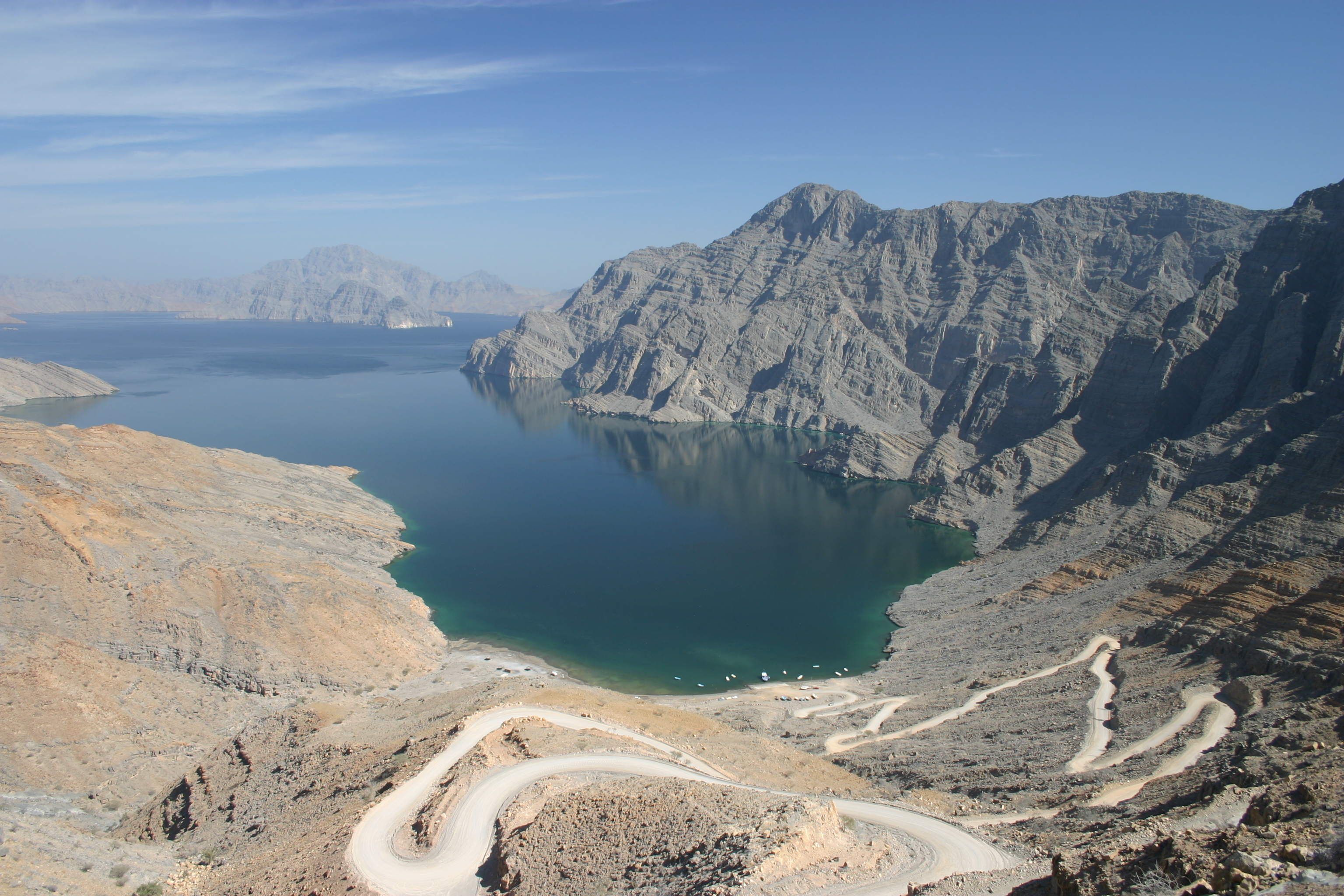

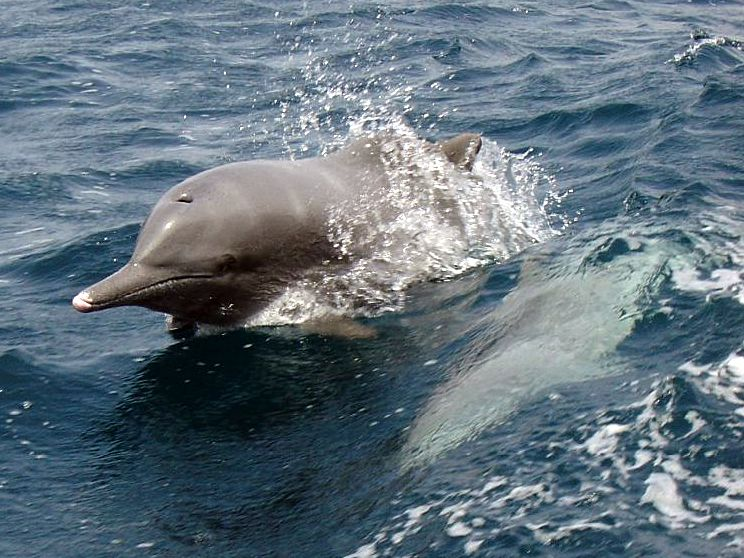
Indian Ocean humpback dolphin off Khasab

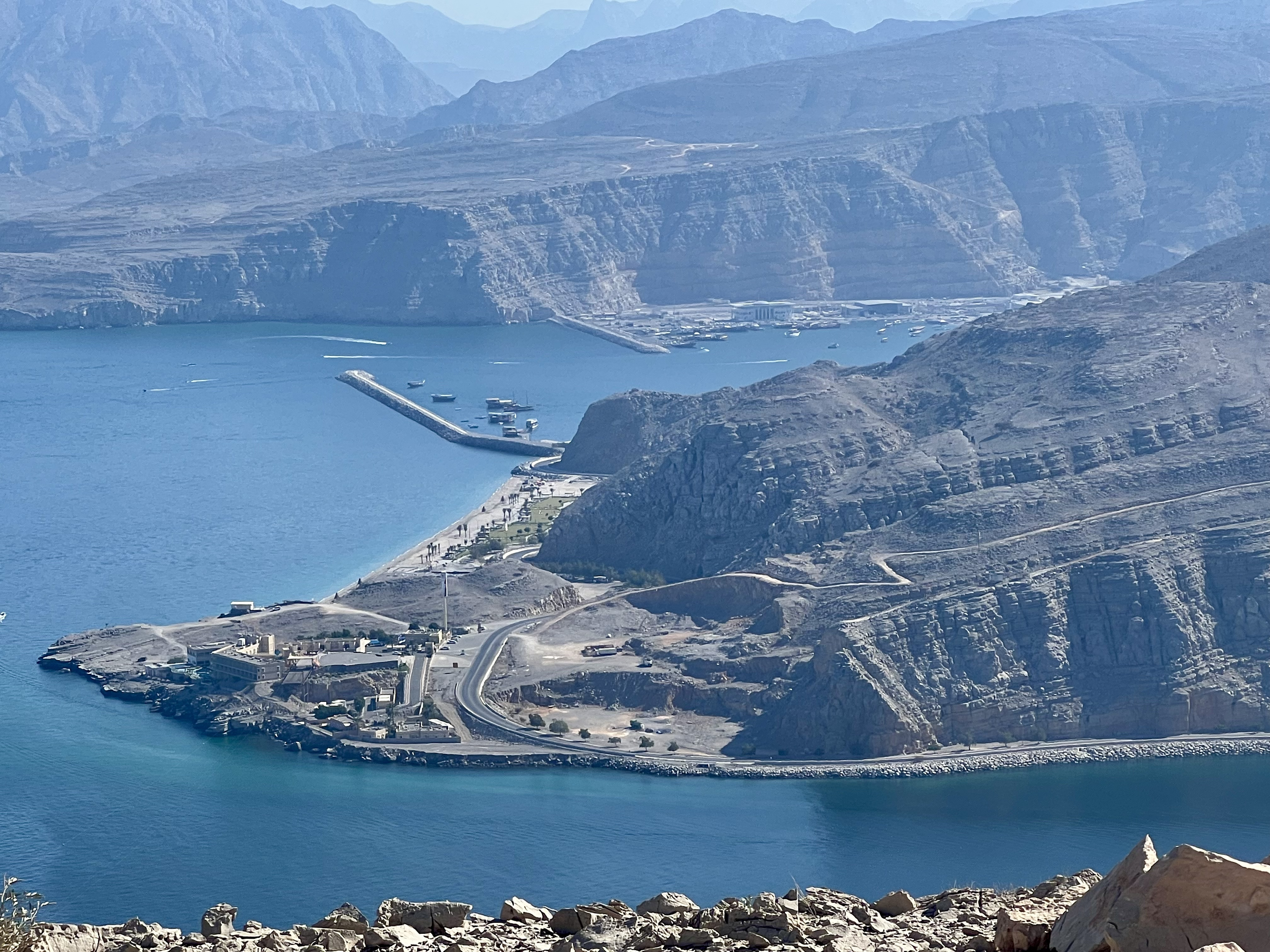
Khasab Harbor, with Atana Khasab Hotel in foreground and station for over-sea zipline

== See also ==
- Bukha
- Dibba Al-Bay'ah
- Madha
- Kumzar
- List of cities in Oman
