= Musandam Governorate =

Governorate of Oman

Musandam Governorate مُحَافَظَة مُسَنْدَم
- Governorate
- Musandam Governorate of Oman. The exclave of Madha is indicated in red south of the Musandam Peninsula.
- Coordinates: 25°55′N 56°17′E
- Country: Oman
- Capital: Khasab

Government
  - Sultan: Haitham bin Tariq Al Said
  - Governor: Sayyid Faisal bin Hamoud bin Nasr Al Busaidi

Area
  - Total: 1,800 km^{2} (690 sq mi)

Population (2020 census)
  - Total: 49,062
  - Density: 27/km^{2} (71/sq mi)

The Musandam Governorate (Arabic: مُحَافَظَة مُسَنْدَم, romanized: Muḥāfaẓat Musandam) is a governorate of Oman. Except for the exclave of Madha, it is located on the Musandam Peninsula, which juts into the Strait of Hormuz, the narrow entry into the Persian Gulf, from the Arabian Peninsula. The governorate is also an exclave, separated from the rest of Oman by the United Arab Emirates. Its location gives Oman partial control, shared with Iran, of the strategic strait. In the northern section of Musandam, around Kumzar, the language is Kumzari, which is a southwestern Iranian language closely related to Larestani and Luri. The Musandam Peninsula has an area of 1,800 km^{2} (690 sq mi) and, at the 2020 census, a population of 49,062.

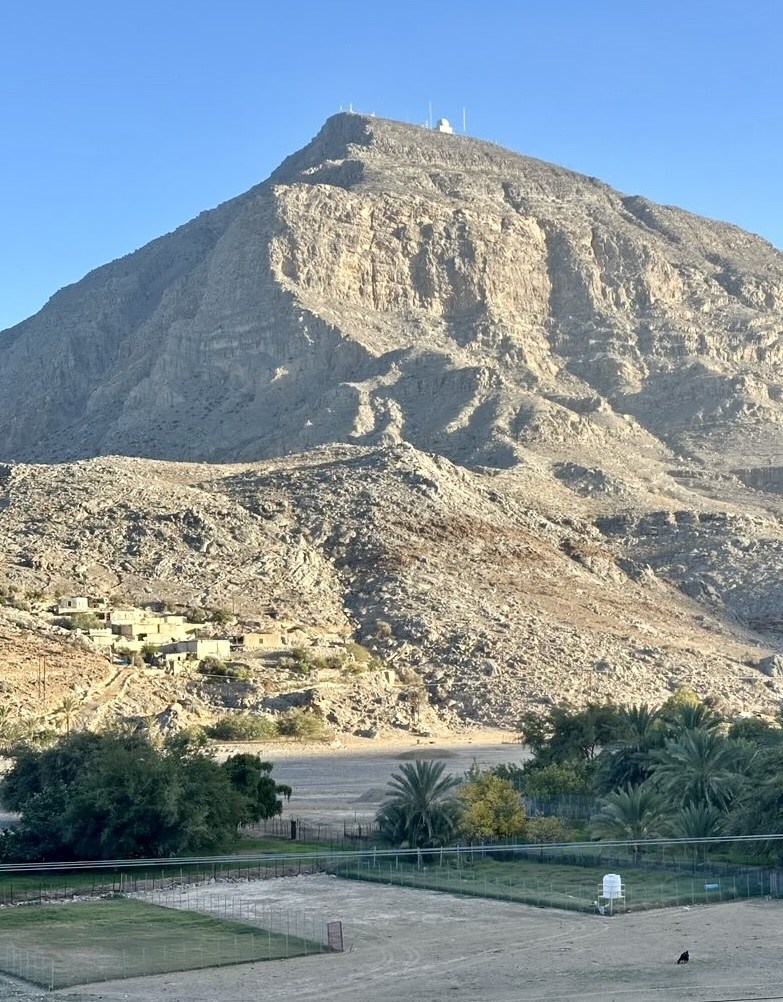
Jebel Harim, highest point in Musandam

Access to the peninsula was formerly difficult, with the only options being limited flights or a ten-hour drive through four immigration posts. The Shinas fast ferry service between Muscat and Musandam was launched in August 2008 to alleviate this problem and make the region more accessible. The governorate is accessible by land only from the United Arab Emirates. Mainland Musandam can be accessed by Ras Al Khaimah near Al Jeer via Khasab – Tibat Road, and an exclave of Sharjah, Dibba Al-Hisn. Oman Air provides an air link between the capital of the country, Muscat, and the main administrative town of the governorate, Khasab.

== History ==
Isolated from surrounding powers by mountainous terrain and a rocky coast, the Musandam peninsula was historically self-ruled by local tribes including the Shihuh and Habus. By the early 20th century, Musandam was claimed by the Sultan of Oman who stationed a representative in Khasab. The Sultan did not exert effective control over the area, neither collecting tax nor establishing a military presence, and the peninsula continued to be ruled by local tribes. In 1970–71, following the British-backed 1970 Omani coup d'état, British and Trucial Oman Scouts forces invaded Musandam ending local rule and establishing a permanent Omani military force.

== Provinces ==
Musandam Governorate consists of four provinces:

- Khasab, the regional centre of the Governorate
- Bukha
- Dibba Al-Bay'ah
- Madha, itself an exclave, located halfway between the rest of Musandam and Oman proper

The area has great strategic importance owing to its proximity to the Strait of Hormuz. The administrative head of the Governorate is the governor, who is also the Minister of State. The current governor is Sayyid Faisal bin Hamoud bin Nasr Al Busaidi (الـسَّـیِّـد فيصل بن حمود بن نصر الْـبُـوسَـعِـيـدي).

== Geography ==
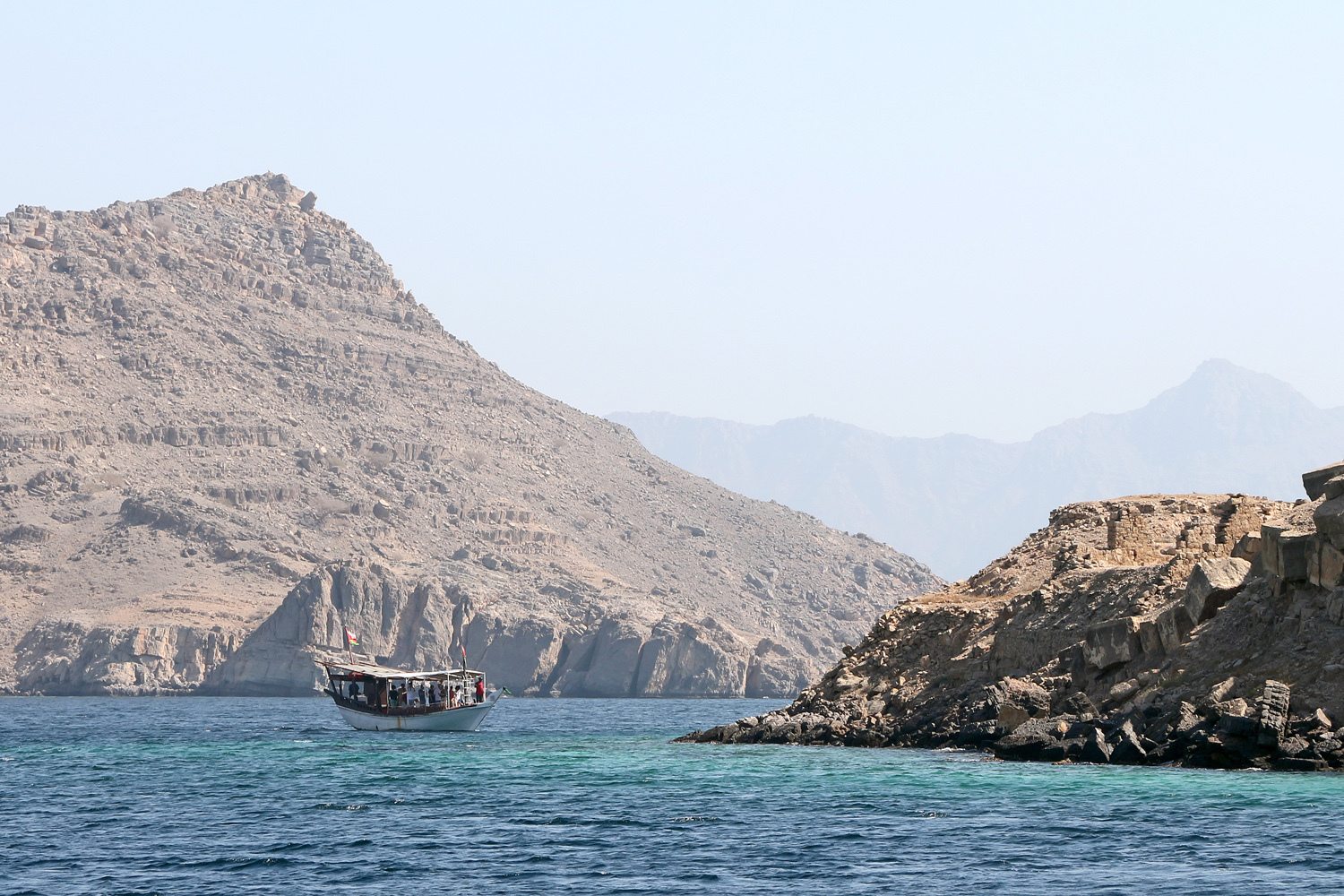
Dhow along the coast of Khasab

The rugged coastline resembles the glacier-carved coasts of polar regions, but in this case, the coast was shaped by the movement of Earth's crust. The Arabian Plate is slowly pushing under the Eurasian Plate, creating the earthquake-prone mountains of Iran. On the leading edge of the Arabian Plate, the Musandam Peninsula is sinking. The higher elevation mountains remain above the water, but the sea has rushed in to fill the valleys with fingers of water. The highest point in Musandam is Jabal Al Harim, with an elevation of 2,087 meters (6,847 feet) above sea level.

== Government ==
The governorate is headed by a Governor (Sheikh) appointed by the Sultan of Oman.

Governor	Term of Office	Monarch(s)
Office established
Mohammed bin Ahmed al Harthi Arabic: محمد بن أحمد الحارثي	1984 – 1990	Sultan Qaboos bin Said
Abdullah bin Hamad al Busaidi Arabic: عبدالله بن حمد البوسعيدي	1990 – 1991	Sultan Qaboos bin Said
Subaa bin Hamdan bin Subaa al Saadi Arabic: سباع بن حمدان بن سباع السعدي	1991 – 2010	Sultan Qaboos bin Said
Saud bin Hilal bin Hamad Al-Sammar Al-Busaidi Arabic: سعود بن هلال بن حمد السمار البوسعيدي	2010 – 2011	Sultan Qaboos bin Said
Khalifa bin Al-Mirdas bin Ahmed Al-Busaidi Arabic: خليفة بن المرداس بن أحمد البوسعيدي	2011 – 2019	Sultan Qaboos bin Said
Ibrahim bin Said bin Ibrahim Al-Busaidi Arabic: إبراهيم بن سعيد بن إبراهيم البوسعيدي	2019 – 2022 2022 – 2026	Sultan Qaboos bin Said Sultan Haitham bin Tariq
Faisal bin Hamoud bin Nasr Al-Busaidi Arabic: فيصل بن حمود بن نصر البوسعيدي	2026 – present	Sultan Haitham bin Tariq

== Demographics ==
Historical population
Census year	Pop.	±% p.a.
1993	28,727	—
2003	28,378	−0.12%
2010	31,425	+1.47%
2020	49,062	+4.56%
Source: Citypopulation

== See also ==
- Dibba
- Oman–United Arab Emirates border
- Telegraph Island
