= Wadi Khabb Shamsi =

Wadi in Oman

Wadi Khabb Shamsi Wādī Khab ash Shāmsī
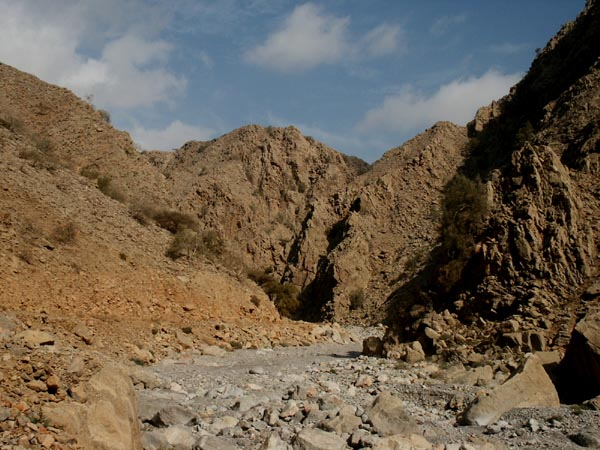
- Wadi Khabb Shamsi. Oman

- Location within Oman Location within Persian Gulf Location within West and Central Asia
- Native name: وادي خب الشامسي (Arabic)

Location
- Country: Oman
- Governorate: Musandam

Physical characteristics
- Source: On the eastern slope of Jabal Qihwi (1,735 m (5,692 ft)), at (1,705 m (5,594 ft)) altitude.
  - elevation: 1,705 m (5,594 ft)
- Mouth: In the Gulf of Oman, next to the port, beach and residential area of Karsha, in Dibba Al-Baya, Musandam Governorate, Oman
  - location: Karshā, Musandam, Oman
  - coordinates: 25°38′56.0″N 56°16′08.0″E
  - elevation: 0 m (0 ft)
- Length: 28.6 km (17.8 mi)
- Basin size: 133 km^{2} (51 mi^{2})

Basin features
- River system: Karsha / Wadi Khabb Shamsi
- Tributaries
  - left: Wadi Muqi
  - right: Wadi Wa'ab, Wadi Khabb Naqbi, Wadi as Sabban, Wadi Hiyar

Wadi Khabb Shamsi (Arabic: وادي خب الشامسي, romanized: Wādī Khab ash Shāmsī), is a valley or dry river, with ephemeral or intermittent flow, flowing almost exclusively during the rainy season, located west of the Musandam Governorate, in the Sultanate of Oman.

Wadi Khabb Shamsi drains the southeast of Ru'us al-Jibal, and is the main wadi of the drainage basin of Karsha, named after the port, beach and current residential area of the city of Dibba Al-Baya (Oman), into which it flows.

The entire drainage basin of Karsha, formed by the Wadi Khabb Shamsi itself and its numerous tributaries and sub-tributaries, covers an approximate area of 133 km^{2} (51 mi^{2}). It is bordered to the north by the Al Rawdah drainage basin, also in Oman; to the west with the basins of Wadi Bih, Wadi Naqab and Wadi Tawiyean / Wādī Ţawīyayn; to the south with that of Wadi Basseirah; and to the east with a small mountain range of just over 6 km (3.7 mi) in length, whose highest peak is Jabal an Nakhlah (629 m (2,064 ft)), that separates the main channel of the Wadi Khabb Shamsi from the city of Zighi / Zaghi, on the coast of the Gulf of Oman.

The highest point of the Wadi Khabb Shamsi drainage basin is located on the summit of Jebel Qihwi / Jabal Qa'wah (1,735 m (5,692 ft)).

== Sources ==
In hydrology, a main river is usually defined as the course with the greatest flow volume of water (average or maximum), or with the greatest length or greatest area of drainage, although sometimes, when a river is fed by more than one source, chooses to define the main river as the one with the highest source or headwaters.

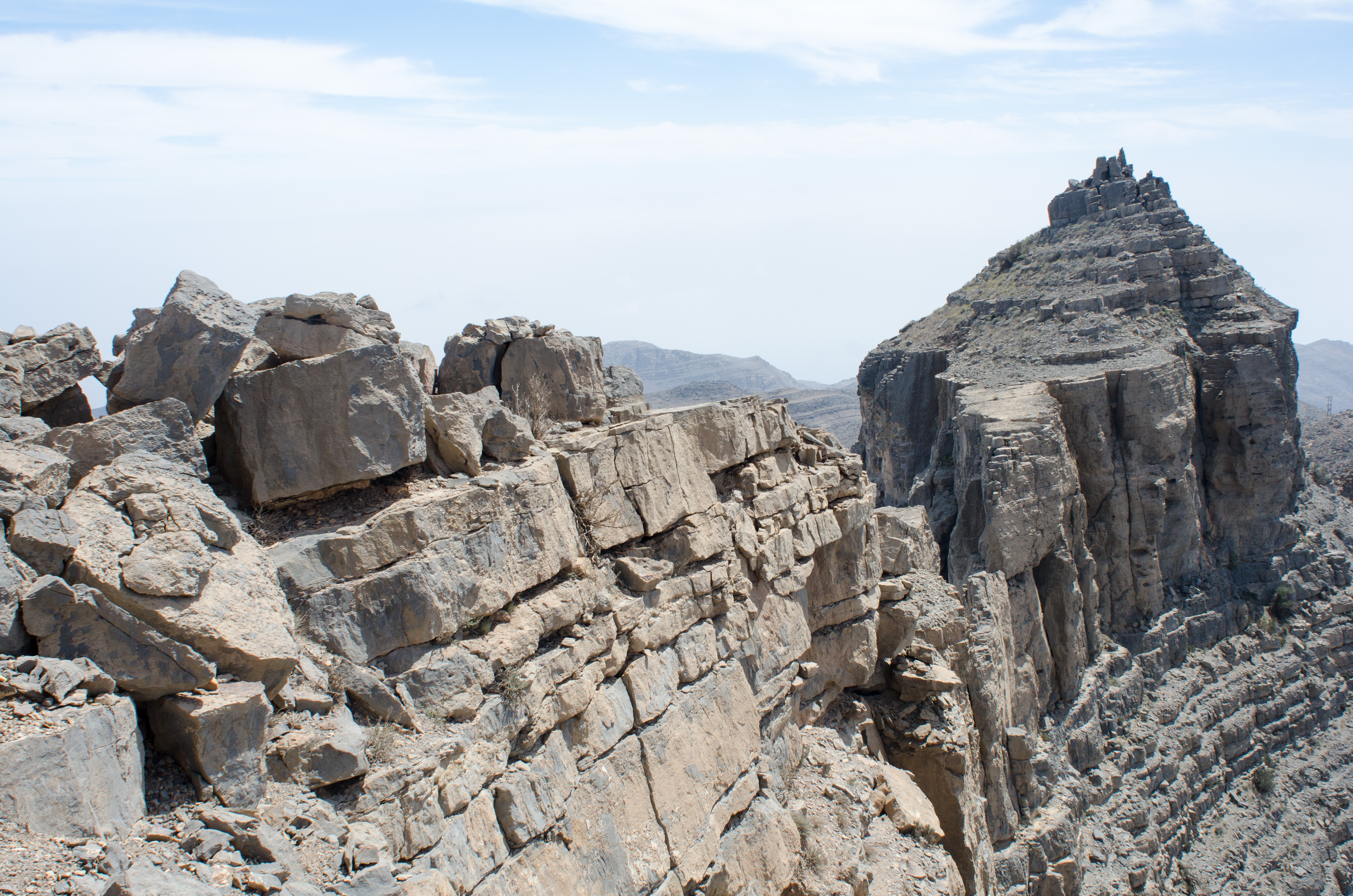
Jabal Qihwi (1,735 m (5,692 ft)) is the highest point in the Wadi Khabb Shamsi drainage basin

In the case of Wadi Khabb Shamsi, several possible headwaters can be identified, and depending on which of them is considered the main one, the total length of the wadi also varies. Among the different options, three stand out:

- Firstly, the one located on the eastern slope of Jabal Qihwi, 120 m (390 ft) east of its summit, at an approximate altitude of 1,705 m (5,594 ft). If this point is taken as a reference, and the course of the river is considered to end at its mouth in the Gulf of Oman, the total length of the wadi would be 28.60 km (17.77 mi).
- A second source could also be considered located 1.4 km (0.87 mi) south of the town and mountain pass from Aqabat al Asu / Aqabat Oso, to an approximate altitude of 1,081 m (3,547 ft), which would result in a total length of 31.50 km (19.57 mi).
- And finally, there is a third possible source or headwater, located 600 m (2,000 ft) south of the summit of Jabal Hagab / Jabal Haqab (1,470 m (4,820 ft)), at an approximate altitude of 1,327 m (4,354 ft), which would give a total length of Wadi Khabb Shamsi of 31.8 km (19.8 mi).

Having ruled out the second option, due to its lower elevation and shorter length than the third, the remaining two have arguments in their favor to be considered as the source of the Wadi Khabb Shamsi, although in the absence of official maps or an expressed statement by local authorities, the best specialists currently favor the former, and consider that the wadi begins in the Jabal Qihwi / Jebel Qi'wi / Jabal Qa'wah.

== Course ==
The Jabal Qihwi جبل قهوي (Arabic) (1,735 m (5,692 ft)), along with the Jabal al Harim (2,087 m (6,847 ft)) and Jabal Bil Ays / Jebel Jais (1,911 m (6,270 ft), are the three highest and most representative mountains of the Musandam Governorate, in Oman.

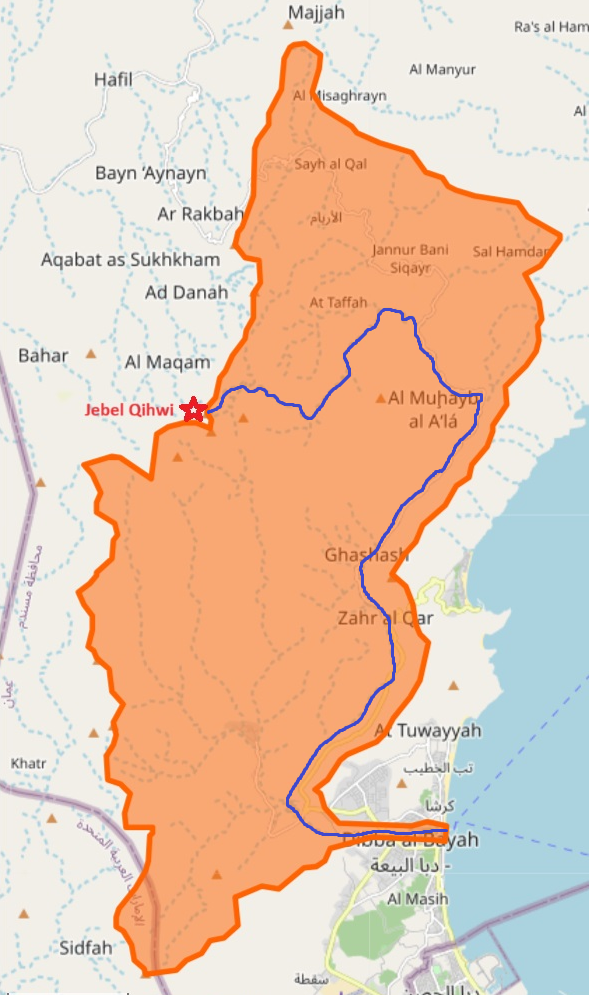
Karsha - Wadi Khabb Shamsi drainage basin - Musandam Governorate - Oman - Map from OpenStreetMap (Standard)

Jabal Qihwi has a prominence of 1,435 m (4,708 ft) and a topographic isolation of 23.36 km (14.52 mi), and rises in the central area of the western boundary of the watershed of Karsha / Wadi Khabb Shamsi. Its summit is located on the watershed, between the basins of the Wadi Khabb Shamsi (which flows into the Gulf of Oman) and the Wadi Bih, which has its main sources of origin on the southern and eastern slopes of the Jabal Al Harim (2,087 m (6,847 ft)), also in the Governorate of Musandam (Oman), and flows towards the Persian Gulf, flowing into territory of United Arab Emirates.

The steep arête of the mountain, divided into short, steep steps, contains two relevant peaks: the northern peak (Jabal Qihwi), and a smaller peak located 450 m (1,480 ft) to the south, on which there is a meteorological station, called on some maps Jabal Khabb, with an elevation of 1,708 m (5,604 ft).

The first 4 km (2.5 mi) of the Wadi Khabb Shamsi, from its source on the eastern slope of the Jabal Qihwi, have the characteristics of an upper course, and initially run in a west-east direction, with a very steep slope, forming a ravine of 700 m (2,300 ft) that crosses the dirt track that serves the meteorological station installed on the minor summit.

After receiving on the right the confluence of a small wadi that collects the waters of other ravines on the same slope, the Khabb Shamsi slightly moderates its slope and continues its course for another 700 m (2,300 ft), heading northeast, to continue for 2.5 km (1.6 mi) more in a south-southeast direction, again with a steep slope, many medium and large-sized rocks, and the presence of narrow gorges.

At the end of those first kilometers of the upper course, the wadi begins its middle course with a flow reinforced by the contributions of successive tributaries and characterized by a moderate slope, turning for 3.5 km (2.2 mi) towards the northeast, and then for 1.5 km (0.93 mi) towards the south-southeast, until intercepting, south of the village of Al Hakil, the long dirt track called Wadi Khabb Shamsi Road.

This dirt road, which uses a good part of the bed of the Wadi Khabb Shamsi and some of its tributaries, begins in Dibba Al-Baya, and ends at the Wadi Bih - Ras Al Khaimah Road (both ends in Musandam Governorate, Oman), and can be used for all-terrain vehicle traffic. The route has a total length of 36 km (22 mi) and crosses the mountain range through the mountain pass of Aqabat al Asu / Aqabat Oso, overcoming an accumulated positive slope of 1,750 m (5,740 ft) and a negative slope of 1,550 m (5,090 ft).

At this same intersection, located almost 9 km (5.6 mi) from its source, a very important arm of the Wadi Khabb Shamsi also converges with it. This arm provides the flow of numerous wadis tributaries and sub-tributaries from the north of the drainage basin, among them those born on the southern slopes of Jabal Hagab / Jabal Haqab, and from the town and mountain pass of Aqabat al Asu / Aqabat Oso.

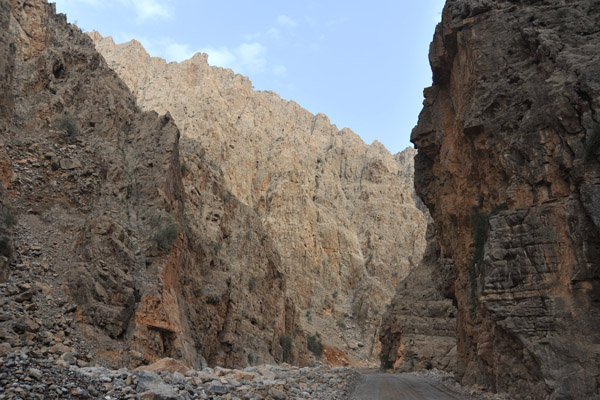
Wadi Khabb Shamsi. Oman. Author:Brian McMorrow

With an already considerable flow volume of water, the Wadi Khabb Shamsi continues its course in a south-southeast direction, sandwiched between large cliffs that rise abruptly on both sides (up to 1,200 m (3,900 ft) to the southwest and 600 m (2,000 ft) to the south. northeast), and its channel, which in that area has an average of 30–40 m (98–131 ft) wide, contracts in some points to 10–12 m (33–39 ft), making the depth of water reaches 15 m (49 ft) or more when the wadi floods.

These same cliffs in the middle course of the Wadi Khabb Shamsi offer multiple points of interest for rock climbing.

Approximately at kilometer 11.5 from its source, the wadi makes a 90° turn in a south-southwest direction, and begins to follow the coastline, at a distance of 2 to 3 km (1.2 to 1.9 mi), separated from the coast by a small mountain range, on whose eastern slope there are several short wadis, which pour their waters directly into the Gulf of Oman. In this area, the Wadi Khabb Shamsi channel progressively widens, as it loses slope and approaches the area of its lower course.

In the final stretch of the lower course of the Wadi Khabb Shamsi, coinciding with the area of confluence of its tributaries Wadi Hiyar, Wadi Khabb Naqbi, and Wadi as Sabban, 4 km (2.5 mi) before its mouth into the Gulf of Oman, a 17.40 m (57.1 ft) high dam, called Wadi Al Khab Dam, was built in 2006, which has a reservoir area with capacity of 2.8 million m³, intended mainly to feed groundwater resources and to reduce damage from eventual floods.

== Toponymy ==
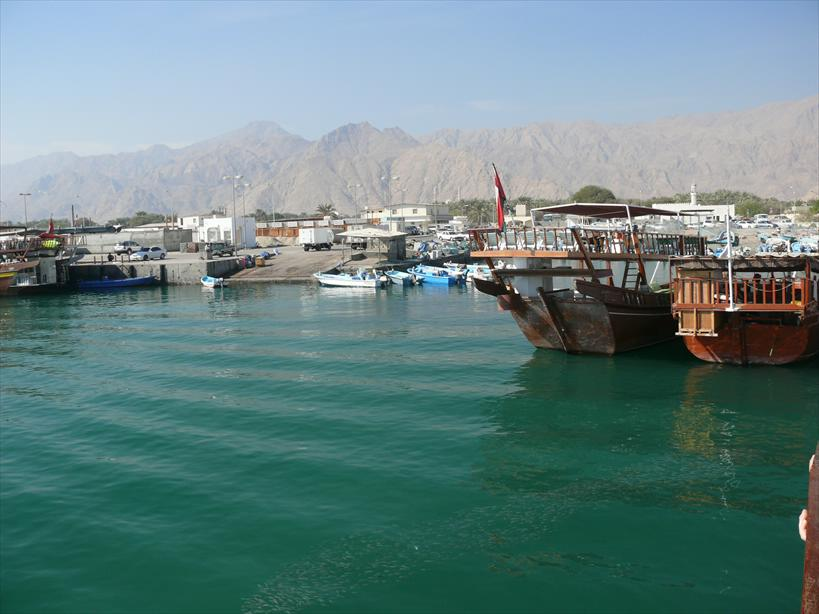
View of the port of Dibba Al-Baya, Oman, next to the mouth of the Wadi Khabb Shamsi

Alternative names: Wādī Khabb Ash Shāmsī, Wadi Khabb Shamsi, Wādī Khabb Shamsī, Wadi Khub al Shamzi, Wadi Khab Al Shamis, Wadi Khabb ash Shamisi.

The names of the Wadi Khabb Shamsi (spelled Wādī Khabb Shamsī) and some of its main tributaries were recorded in the documentation and maps prepared between 1950 and 1960 by the British Arabist, cartographer, military officer and diplomat Julian F. Walker, during the work carried out to establish borders between the then called Trucial States, later completed by the United Kingdom Ministry of Defence, on 1:100,000 scale maps published in 1971.

== Population ==
The geographical area of the Wadi Khabb Shamsi and its tributaries was historically populated by the semi-nomadic tribe Shihuh, section of Bani Shatair (Arabic: بني شطير), one of the two main sections of the tribe, which occupied, among other territories, the tribal areas of Maqadihah and Dihamara.

== See also ==
- List of wadis of Oman
- List of mountains in Oman
- List of wadis of the United Arab Emirates
- List of mountains in the United Arab Emirates
