= Jabal Qihwi =

Mountain in Oman

- Jabal Qa'wah
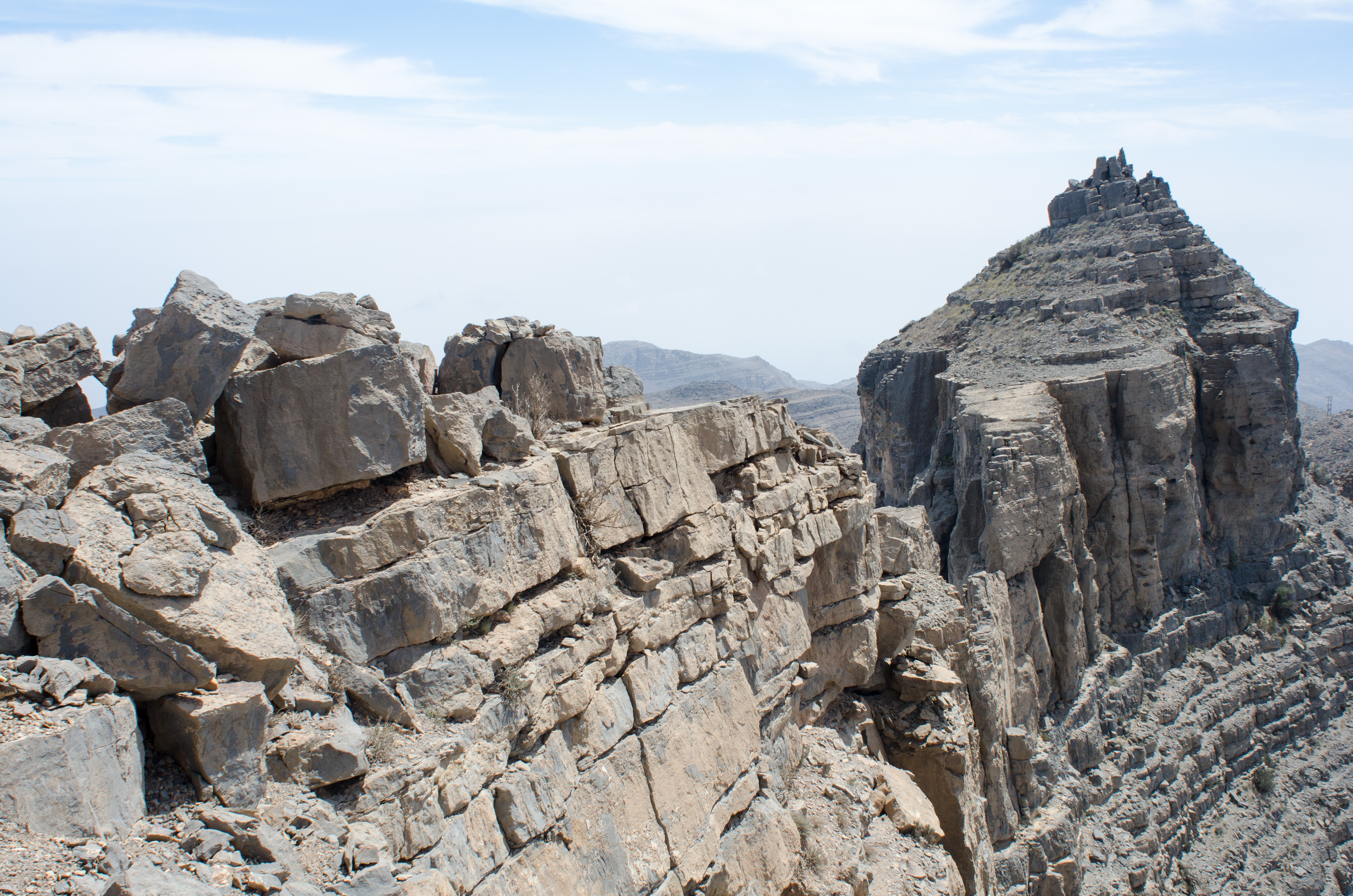
- View of Jabal Qihwi / Jabal Qa'wah

Highest point
- Elevation: 1,735 m (5,692 ft)
- Prominence: 1,435 m (4,708 ft)
- Isolation: 23.36 km (14.52 mi)
- Coordinates: 25°44′35.7″N 56°12′36.4″E

Naming
- Native name: جبل قاوي (Arabic)

Geography
- Location within Oman Location within Persian Gulf Location within West and Central Asia
- Location: Musandam Governorate
- Country: Oman
- Parent range: Hajar Mountains

Jabal Qihwi or Jabal Qa'wah (Arabic: جبل قهوي, romanized: Jabal Qahwī) (1,735 m (5,692 ft)), along with the Jabal Al Harim (2,087 m (6,847 ft)) and Jabal Bil Ays / Jebel Jais (1,911 m (6,270 ft)), are the three highest and most representative mountains of the Musandam Governorate, in Oman.

Jabal Qihwi has a prominence of 1,435 m (4,708 ft) and a topographic isolation of 23.36 km (14.52 mi), and rises in the central area of the western boundary of the drainage divide of Karsha / Wadi Khabb Shamsi.

Its summit lies on the drainage divide, between the basins of the Wadi Khabb Shamsi (which pours into the Gulf of Oman) and the Wadi Bih, which has its main sources of origin on the southern and eastern slopes of the Jabal Al Harim (2,087 m (6,847 ft)), also in the Musandam Governorate, and pours into the Persian Gulf, landing in United Arab Emirates territory.

The steep slope of the mountain, divided into short and high steps, contains two relevant peaks: the northern peak (Jabal Qihwi), and a lesser peak 450 m (1,480 ft) to the south, on which there is a weather station, is named Jabal Khabb in some maps, with an elevation of 1,708 m (5,604 ft).

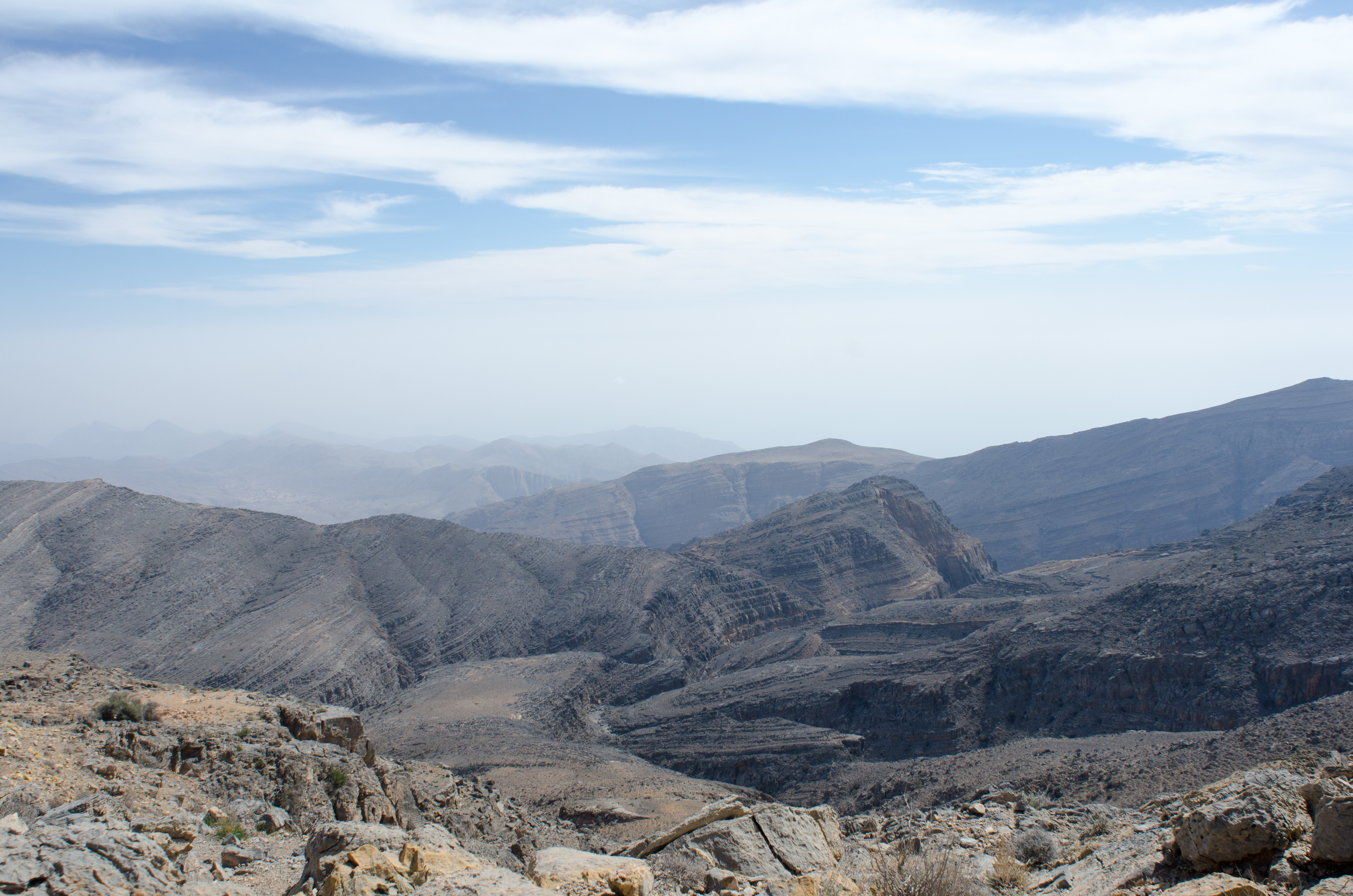
Jabal Qihwi, on the drainage divide, between the Wadi Khabb Shamsi and Wadi Bih basins

At 6 km (3.7 mi) north of Jabal Qihwi is the village and mountain pass of Aqabat al Asu / Aqabat Oso, situated also on the water divide line, at 940 m (3,080 ft).

Through this mountain pass runs a dirt road of 36 km (22 mi), called Wadi Khabb Shamsi Road, which starts at Dibba Al-Baya, and terminates at the Wadi Bih - Ras Al Khaimah Road (both ends in the Musandam Governorate), and can be used for all-terrain vehicular traffic. The route employs a good deal of the river bed of the Wadi Khabb Shamsi and some of its tributaries, and to cross the mountain range overcomes an accumulated positive slope of 1,750 m (5,740 ft) and a negative slope of 1,500 m (4,900 ft).

== Toponymy ==
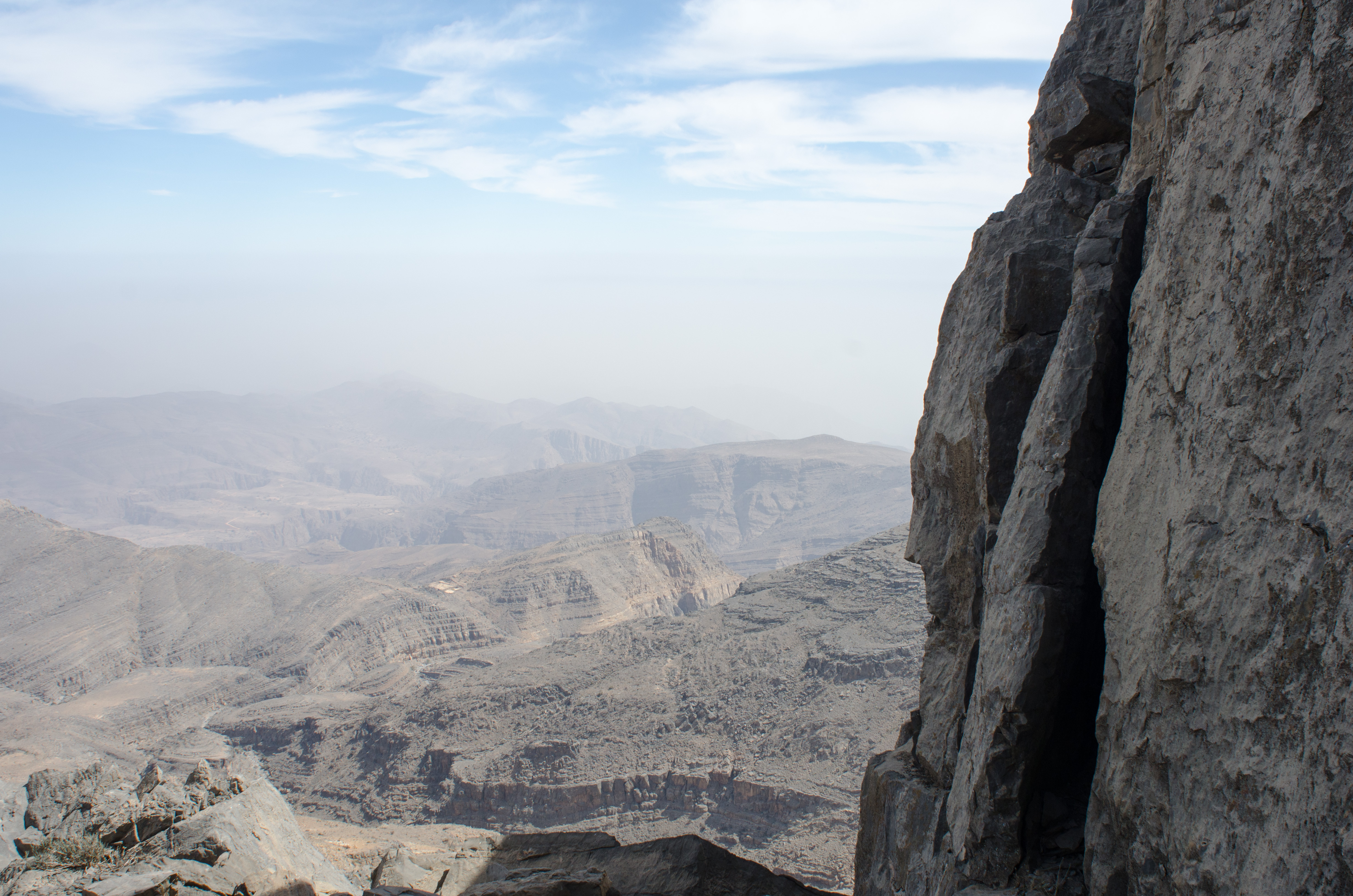
Jabal Qihwi, steep ridge divided into short, pronounced steps

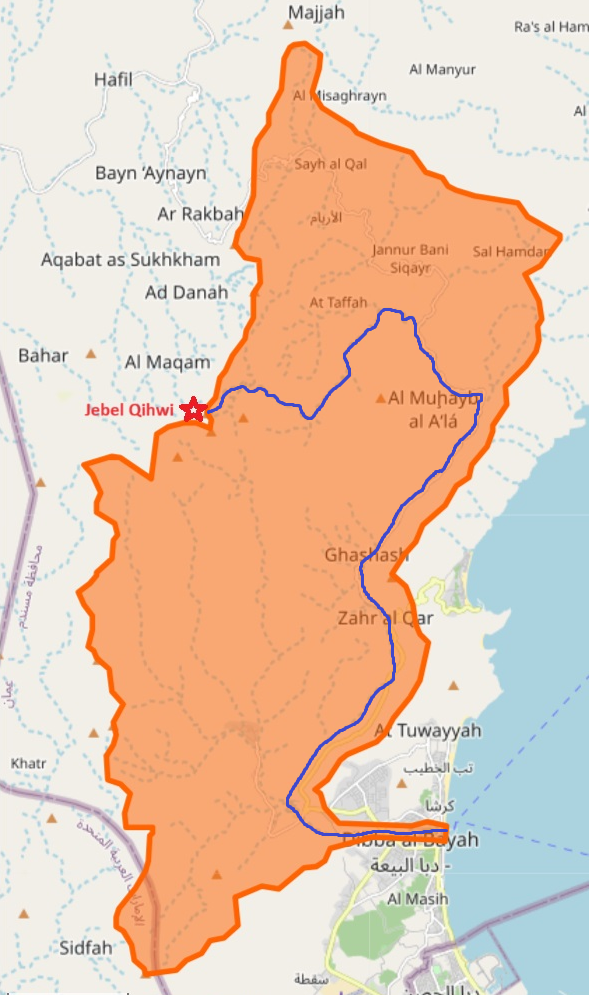
Jabal Qihwi, is the highest point of the Wadi Khabb Shamsi drainage basin. Map from OpenStreetMap (Standard)

Alternative names: Jabal Kawa, Jabal Qa`wa, Jabal Qa`wah, Jabal Qa‘wa, Jabal Qa‘wah, Jabal Qihwi, Jebel Qihwi.

The name of the Jabal Qihwi (with the spellings Jabal Qa'wah and Jabal Qa'awah) appears recorded in the documents and maps prepared between 1950 and 1960 by the British Arabist, cartographer, military officer and diplomat Julian F. Walker, for the work carried out to establish the borders between the then called Trucial States, later completed by the Ministry of Defense of the United Kingdom, on 1:100,000 scale maps published in 1971, and in other previous documents kept in the National Archives of the United Kingdom.

== Population ==
The geographical area of Jabal Qihwi was historically populated by the semi-nomadic Shihuh tribe, section of Bani Shatair (Arabic: بني شطير), one of the two main sections of the tribe, which occupied, among other territories, the tribal areas of Maqadihah and Dihamara.

== See also ==
- List of mountains in Oman
- List of wadis of Oman
- List of mountains in the United Arab Emirates
- List of wadis of the United Arab Emirates
- Middle East
  - Eastern Arabia
