= List of mountains in Oman =

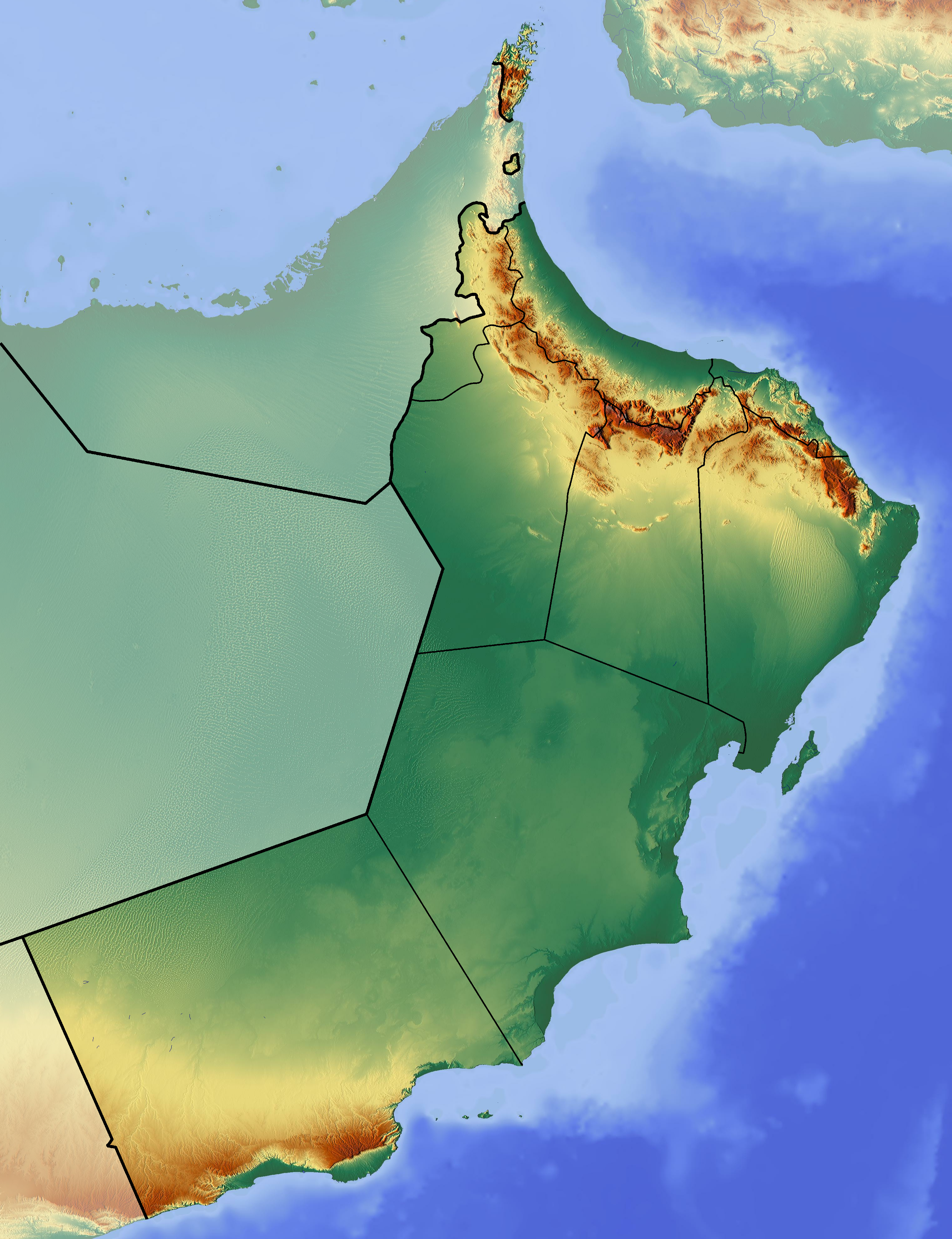
Oman topographic map

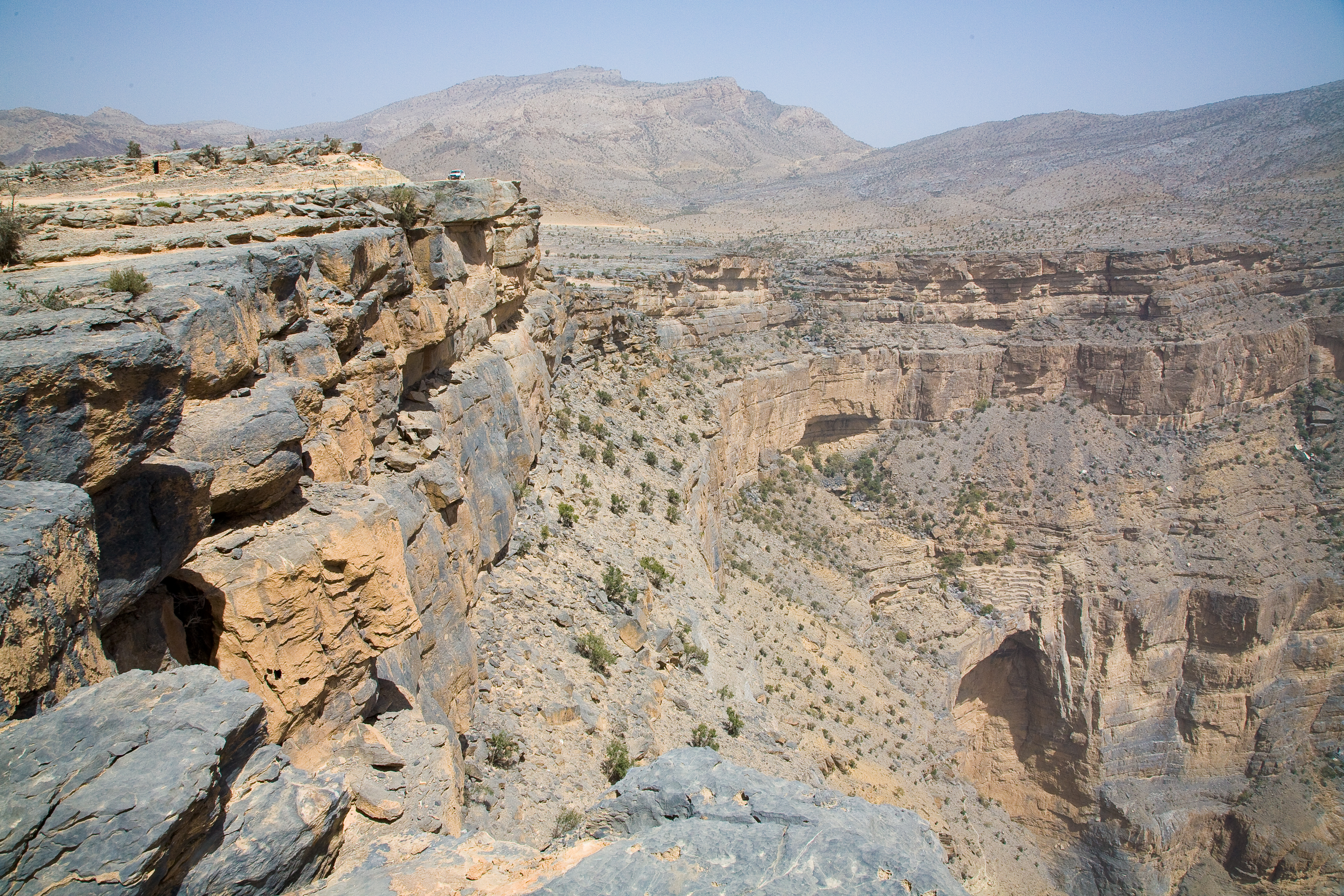
Oman - Jebel Shams Grand Canyon

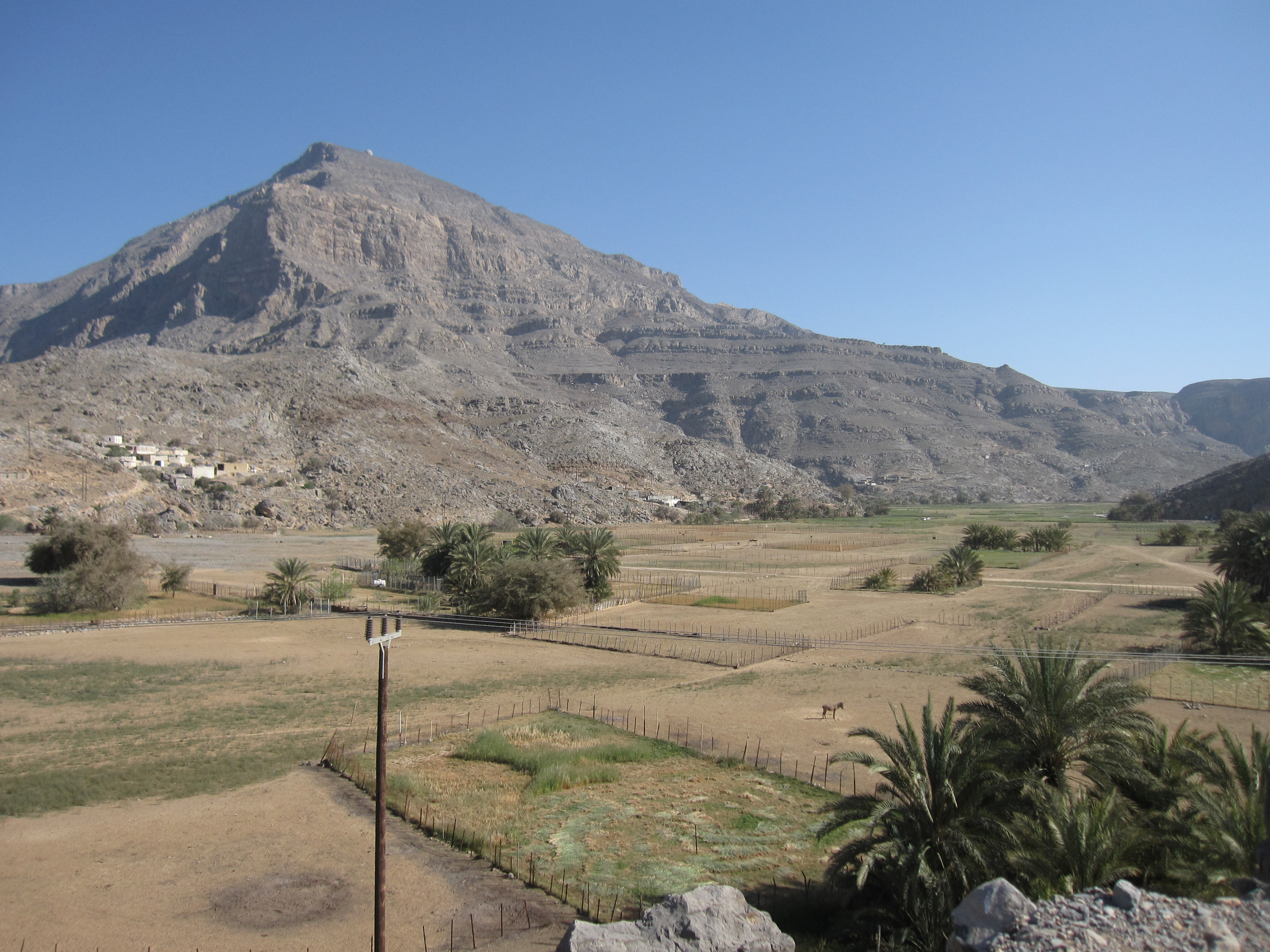
View of Jabal Harim from the Green Valley

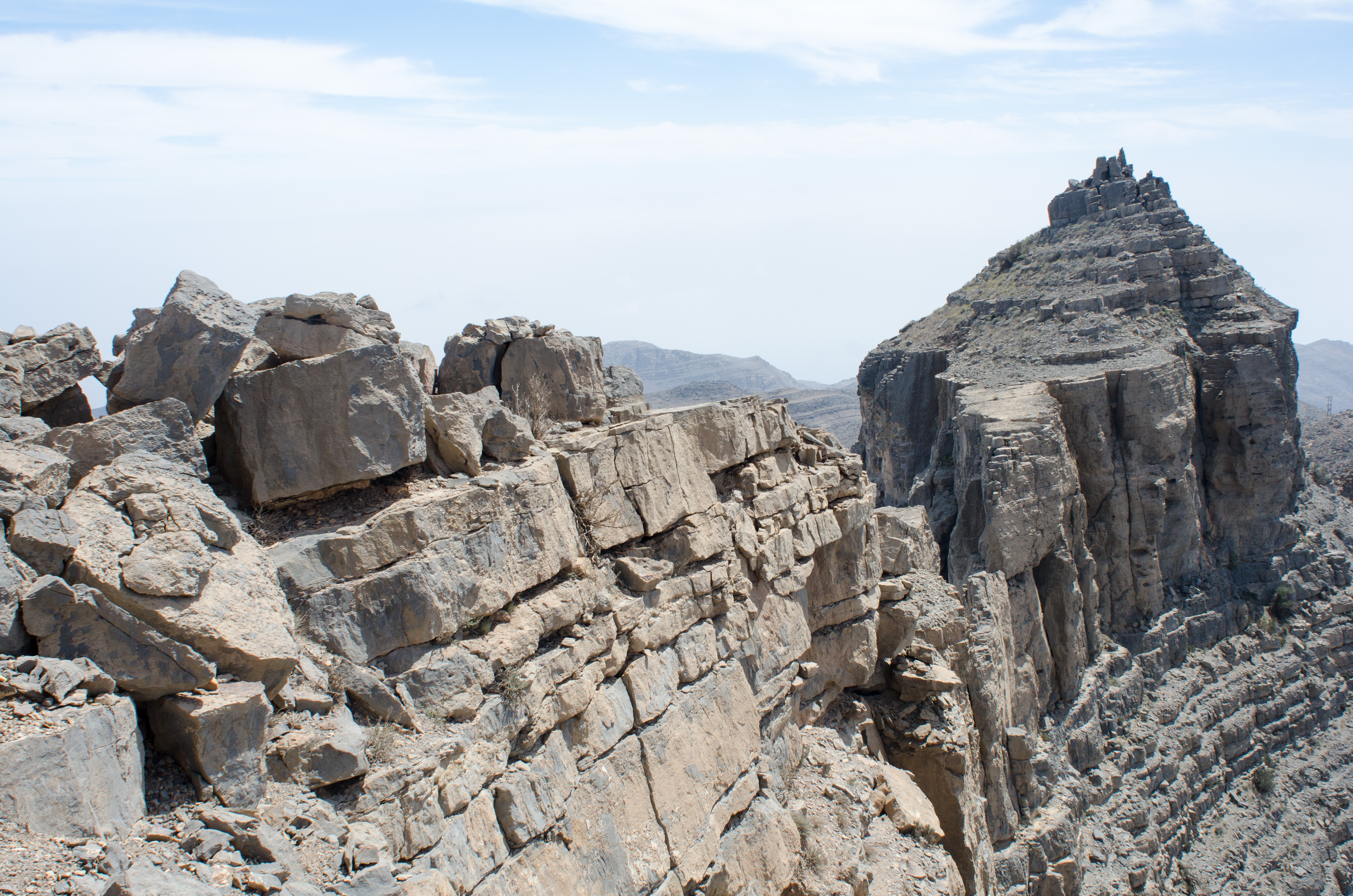
Jebel Qihwi. In the Ru'us al-Jabal Mountains, Musandam Peninsula, Oman

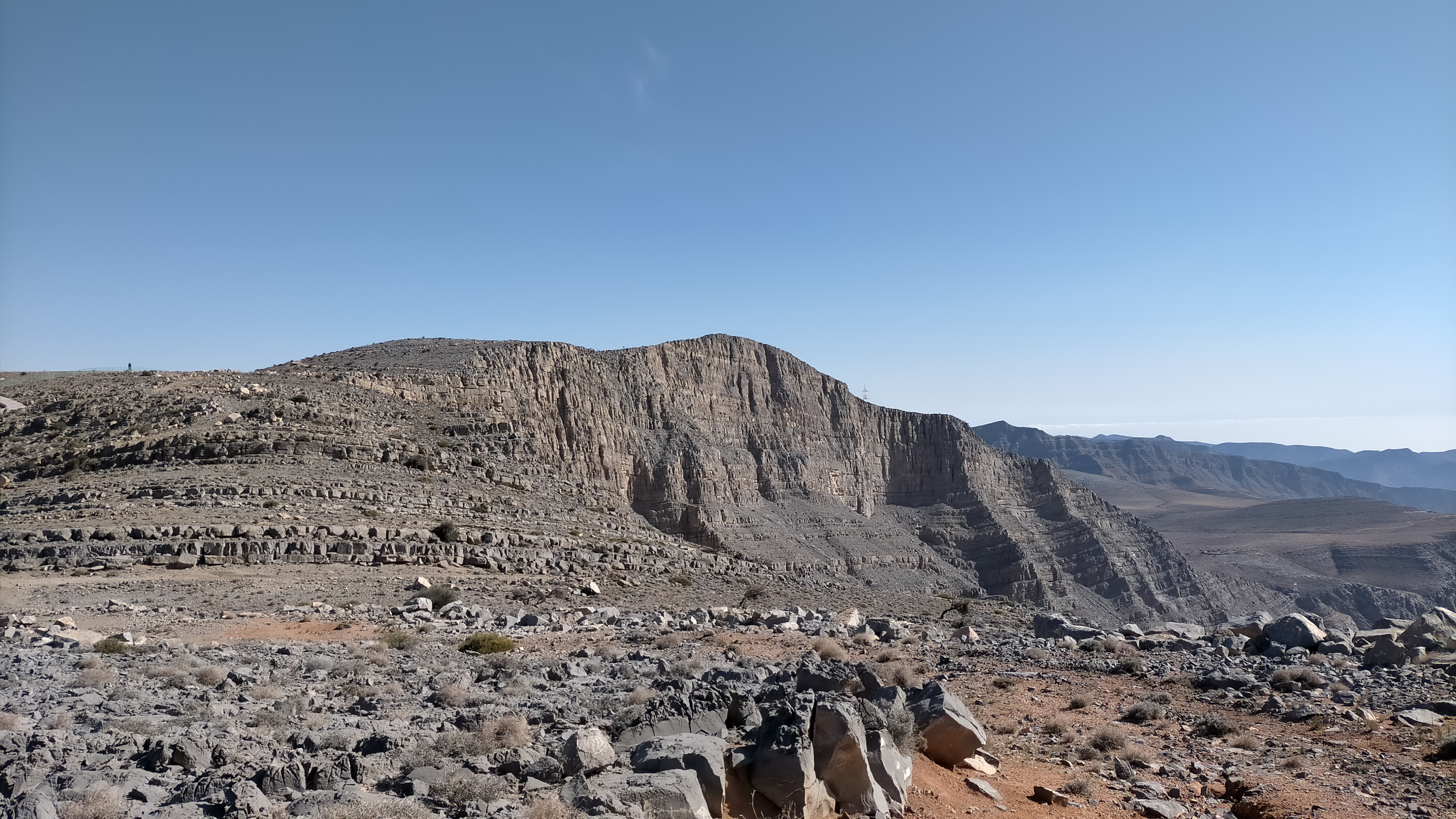
View of the top of Jabal Bil Ays - Jebel Jais and its southern slope

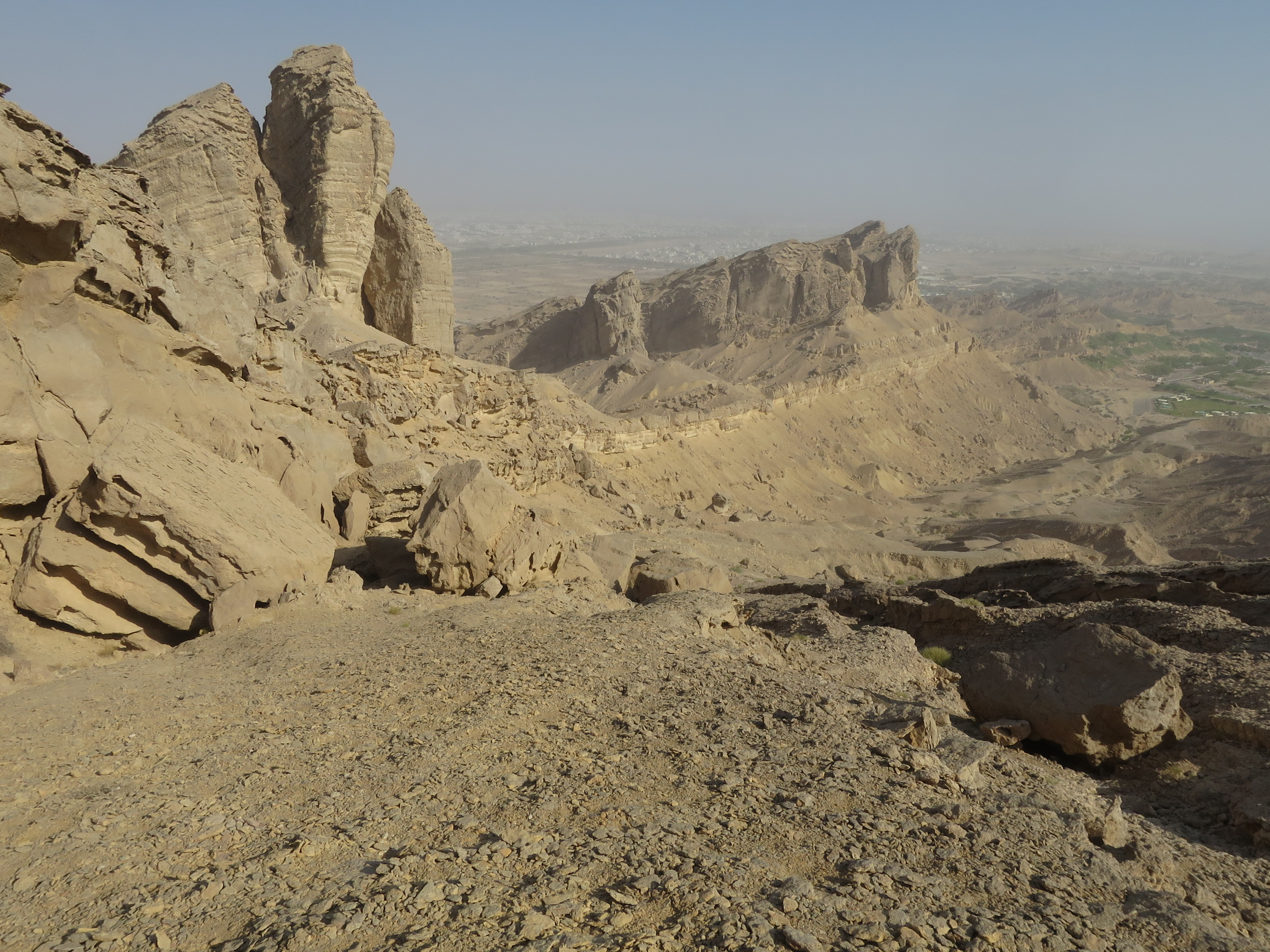
View of Jebel Hafeet

Although much of the country has a desert or semi-desert and relatively flat territory, Oman has mountains that include the Hajar Mountains (Arabic: جبال الحجر), located in the northeast of Oman and the far northeast of the United Arab Emirates. These mountains constitute the tallest mountain range in the eastern part of the Arabian Peninsula.

The highest peaks are found in the Jebel Akhdar Mountains (in Arabic: الجبل الأخض), mountain massif approximately 80 km (50 mi) long and 32 km (20 mi) wide, belonging to the Hajar Mountains, which covers an area of 1,135 km^{2} (438 mi^{2}) located above 1,500 m (4,900 ft), of which, 410 km^{2} (160 mi^{2}) are located above 2,000 m (6,600 ft), and 30 km^{2} (12 mi^{2}) are above 2,500 m (8,200 ft).

On the other hand, some of the most relevant peaks, although of lower altitude, are located on the border between Oman and the United Arab Emirates, since in some cases, their position was taken as a reference for the defining the border between the two countries.

However, although a boundary agreement was signed and ratified in 2003, covering the entire border between Oman and the United Arab Emirates, including Oman's enclaves on the Musandam Peninsula and in Mahdah, the contents of the agreement have not yet been published, nor detailed maps showing the alignment, despite the fact that some border markers and fences have already been placed on the ground. The future publication of these agreements and maps could make it necessary to modify the content of this annex.

This list includes the name and location of the summits located entirely within the territory of Oman, or at least with its summit located on the border line, regardless of its height. The list is open to new additions referring to mountains that meet these conditions, with a known name and position, and whose reference data is supported by historical maps or other reliable documentary sources.

The list only includes the mountains that, by an objective classification, can be considered as independent and individual mountains, as opposed to subsidiary mountains of a larger one, sub-summits or simple high points.

Many of these mountains are known by different names, the result of local tradition and of the various transcriptions from Arabic to English, so that an individual reference note includes the alternative names with which the mountain has been identified at some point, accompanied by their respective documentary sources.

The region is represented in different satellite images, mainly Google Earth, Google Satellite and Bing Satellite. The exact coordinates of each summit and its altitude, with respect to the sea level, have been established by comparing the OpenTopoMap and OpenMapTiles topographic maps with these images, treating each with the greatest objectivity and the same measurement criteria for all the summits. In some cases, direct recognition and location by GPS have also been used, or references have been checked against data provided by hikers and climbers in itineraries published online.

References provided by the prestigious geographic database of the National Geospatial-Intelligence Agency of the United States Department of Defense have also been taken into account.

In this version of the article, the values of prominence, nor topographic isolation, were not taken into account to give priority to the task of identifying toponyms and locating the summits.

== Mountains of Oman ==
Mountains of Oman
Name	Notes and citations	Order	Mountain range	Country	Governorate / Emirate	Altitude (m)	Coordinates
Jebel Shams	(Note: Alternative Names: Jabal ash Shām, Jabal Sham, Wishām, Jabal Shams, Jabal ash Sham, Wisham, جبل شمس)	001	Hajar Mountains	Oman	Ad Dakhiliyah	3,018	23°14′15.00″N 57°15′49.66″E
Jebel Kawr (peak)	(Note: Alternative Names: Jabal-al-Kor, Jabal Kaur, Jabal Kawr, Jabal al Kawr, Jebel Khaur, Jebel-al-Kor, Jebel Kaur, Jebel Kawr, Jebel al Kawr)	002	Hajar Mountains	Oman	Ad Dakhiliyah	2,730	23°08′19.4″N 57°00′50.7″E
Qarn Wukan / Qarn Wakan	(Note: Alternative Names: Qarn Wukān)	003	Hajar Mountains	Oman	Ad Dakhiliyah	2,498	23°07′57.2″N 57°43′13.5″E
Jebel Qiyut	(Note: Alternative Names: Jabal Qayut, Jabal Qayūt, Jabal Qiyut, Jabal Qiyūt, Jebel Qayūt)	004	Hajar Mountains	Oman	Ad Dakhiliyah	2,382	23°09′09.7″N 57°27′58.2″E
Qarn al Hammam	(Note: Alternative Names: Qarn al Ḩammām, قرن الحمام)	005	Hajar Mountains	Oman	Al Batinah South	2,344	23°16′21.2″N 57°47′15.1″E
Jabal Khadar	(Note: Alternative Names: Jabal Khadar, Jabal Khaḑar, jbl khdr, جبل خدر)	006	Hajar Mountains	Oman	Ash Sharqiyah South	2,200	22°31′47.6″N 59°12′27.9″E
Qarn al Khuzar	(Note: Alternative Names: Qarn al Khuz̧ar, Qarn Khuz̧ar)	007	Hajar Mountains	Oman	Ad Dakhiliyah	2,118	23°01′53.1″N 57°43′07.3″E
Jabal Misht	(Note: Alternative Names: Jabal Misht, Jebel Misht, Jabal Mishţ, jbl msht, جبل مشط)	008	Hajar Mountains	Oman	Ad Dakhiliyah	2,090	23°15′26.0″N 56°59′57.3″E
Jabal Al Harim	(Note: Alternative Names: Jabal Harim, Jebal Al Harim, Jabal al Harim, Jabal al Ḩarīm, Jebal Harim, Jebel Harim, Jabal Ḥārim, Jabal Ḩārim, Jabal Ra'an al-Harim, Shaam Peak, Shuam Peak, jbl harm, جبل حارم)	009	Hajar Mountains	Oman	Musandam	2,087	25°58′35.04″N 56°13′57.00″E
Jabal Nakhal / Jabal Nakhl	(Note: Alternative Names: Jabal Nakhal, Jabal Nakhl, جبل نخل)	010	Hajar Mountains	Oman	Al Batinah South	2,065	23°19′50.0″N 57°52′49.9″E
Ra's ash Shayf	(Note: Alternative Names: Ras ash Shayf)	011	Hajar Mountains	Oman	Ad Dakhiliyah	2,029	23°01′53.9″N 57°40′45.2″E
Jabal Ghul	(Note: Alternative Names: Jabal Ghūl, Jabal Ghul)	012	Hajar Mountains	Oman	Ad Dakhiliyah	1,982	23°07′38.7″N 57°08′51.7″E
Ra's al Kabul	(Note: Alternative Names: Ras al Kabūl, Ras al Kabul, Ras Kabul, Ra’s al Jabūl)	013	Hajar Mountains	Oman	Al Batinah South	1,972	23°01′47.8″N 57°39′13.9″E
Jabal al Jarū‘	(Note: Alternative Names: Jabal al Jaru`, Jabal al Jarū‘, جبل الجروع)	014	Hajar Mountains	Oman	Al Batinah South	1,928	23°13′18.8″N 57°28′48.6″E
Jabal Bil Ays / Jebel Jais	(Note: Alternative Names: Jabal Bal `Isa, Jabal Bal ‘Īsá, Jabal Bil `Ays, Jabal Bil `Isa, Jabal Bil ‘Ays, Jabal Bil ‘Īsá, Jabal Bu al `Ays, Jabal Bū al ‘Ays, Jabal Rawala, Jabal Rawla, Jabal Rawlah, جبل بل عيسى)	015	Hajar Mountains	Oman	Musandam	1,911	25°57′12.3″N 56°11′03.5″E
Jebel Aswad (SE Muscat)	(Note: Alternative Names: Jabal Aswad.)	016	Hajar Mountains	Oman	Muscat	1,909	23°08′16.6″N 58°40′27.6″E
Jabal Haymir	(Note: Alternative Names: Jabal Ḩaymar, Jabal Ḩaymir, Jabal Ḥaymur,جبل حيمر)	017	Hajar Mountains	Oman	Al Batinah South	1,815	23°16′35.6″N 57°39′57.3″E
Jabal Bani Jabr	(Note: Alternative Names: Jabal Bani Jabir, Jabal Banī Jābir, Jebel Bani Jabir, Jebel Banī Jābir, jbl bny jabr, جبل بني جابر.)	018	Hajar Mountains	Oman	Ash Sharqiyah South	1,809	22°43′55.4″N 59°07′41.2″E
Jabal as Sayh	(Note: Alternative Names: Jabal as Sayh, Jabal as Sayḩ.)	019	Hajar Mountains	Oman; United Arab Emirates	Musandam Ras Al Khaimah	1,746	25°58′18.8″N 56°11′30″E
Jebel Qihwi	(Note: Alternative Names: Jabal Kawa, Jabal Qa`wa, Jabal Qa`wah, Jabal Qa‘wa, Jabal Qa‘wah, Jabal Qihwi, Jebel Qihwi, Jebel Qa‘wah, Jabal Qa'wah, Jabal Qa'awah)	020	Hajar Mountains	Oman	Musandam	1,735	25°44′35.78″N 56°12′36.35″E
Jabal Hadaba	(Note: Alternative Names: Jebel Hadaba.)	021	Hajar Mountains	Oman; United Arab Emirates	Musandam Ras Al Khaimah	1,712	26°01′08.4″N 56°10′56.2″E
Jabal Tafif	(Note: Alternative Names: Jebel Tafif, Jabal Ţafīf, jbl tfyf)	022	Hajar Mountains	Oman	Musandam	1,598	25°43′40.3″N 56°10′09.2″E
Jabal Harf Tila	(Note: Alternative Names: Jabal Harf Tila (major))	023	Hajar Mountains	Oman; United Arab Emirates	Musandam Ras Al Khaimah	1,568	25°41′21.4″N 56°09′30.6″E
Jabal Khanzur	(Note: Alternative Names: Jabal Khanzur, Jabal Khanzūr, jbl khnzwr, جبل خنزور)	024	Hajar Mountains	Oman	Musandam	1,560	25°56′53.1″N 56°12′32.2″E
Jabal Yabana	(Note: Alternative Names: Jabal Yabana (major), Jabal Yabbānah, Jabal Yabana, Jabal Yabanah, Jabal Yabānah.)	025	Hajar Mountains	Oman; United Arab Emirates	Musandam Ras Al Khaimah	1,480	25°52′30.0″N 56°09′36.0″E
Jabal Haqab / Jabal Hagab	(Note: Alternative Names: Jabal Hagab, Jabal Haqab, Jabal Haqb, Jabal Ḥaqb, Jabal Ḩaqab, jbl hqb, جبل حقب)	026	Hajar Mountains	Oman	Musandam	1,470	25°49′44.4″N 56°13′48.4″E
Jabal Bahar	(Note: Alternative Names: Jebel Bahar, Jabal Baḩr, Jabal Al Bahar)	027	Hajar Mountains	Oman	Musandam	1,460	25°45′22.8″N 56°10′53.9″E
Al Jabal al Abyad	(Note: Alternative Names: Al Jabal al Abyad, Al Jabal al Abyaḍ, Al Jabal al Abyaḑ, Jabal Abyad, Jabal Abyaḑ, Jabal al Abyad, Jabal al Abyaḍ, Jabal al Abyaḑ, aljbl alabyd, jbl alabyd, الجبل الأبيض, جبل الأبيض)	028	Hajar Mountains	Oman	Ad Dakhiliyah	1,426	23°35′36.6″N 56°25′04.6″E
Jabal Sham	(Note: Alternative Names: Jebel Sham, Jabal Shām)	029	Hajar Mountains	Oman	Ad Dakhiliyah	1,420	23°52′23.0″N 56°32′52.0″E
Jabal al Harah / Fine Peak	(Note: Alternative Names: Jabal al Ḩārah, Jabal Fine, Ras al Ḩārah, Jabal al Harah, Jabal al Ḥārrah, Fine Peak)	030	Hajar Mountains	Oman	Musandam	1,365	26°06′00.0″N 56°10′33.2″E
Um Alnosoor / Jabal Hatta	(Note: Alternative Names: Jabal Hajarain, Jabal Ḩajarayn, Jabal Hajarayn, Jabal Ḩattá, Jabal Ḩaţţah, Jabal Hattah, Jabal Hatta, Um Alnosoor, Umm Alnosoor, Jabal Umm Nasur.)	031	Hajar Mountains	Oman; United Arab Emirates	Al Buraimi Dubai; Sharjah	1,280	24°44′35.8″N 56°04′53.1″E
Jabal Halat	(Note: Alternative Names: Jabal Hālāt, Jebel Halat)	032	Hajar Mountains	Oman	Ad Dakhiliyah	1,210	23°49′58.8″N 56°33′39.3″E
Jebel Hafeet	(Note: Alternative Names: Djabel Hafit, Djabel Ḩafīt, Jabal Hafi, Jabal Hafit, Jabal Ḥafī, Jabal Ḥafīt, Jabal Ḩafīt, jbl hfyt, جبل حفيت)	033	Hajar Mountains	Oman; United Arab Emirates	Al Buraimi Abu Dhabi	1,108	24°03′28.3″N 55°46′52.5″E
Jabal Sumayni / Jebel Sumeini	(Note: Alternative Names: Jabal Sumayni, Jabal Sumaynī, Jabal Sumeini, Jabal as Sumaini, Jabal as Sumayni, Jabal as Sumaynī, jbl alsmyny, جبل السّميني)	034	Hajar Mountains	Oman	Al Buraimi	1,056	24°42′12.1″N 55°55′02.9″E
Jabal Bu Faraj	(Note: Alternative Names: Jabal Bu Faraj, Jabal Abu Faraj, Jabal Bū Faraj, Jabal Bū Farāj.)	035	Hajar Mountains	Oman; United Arab Emirates	Al Buraimi Ras Al Khaimah	889	24°52′15.92″N 56°03′43.06″E

== Véase también ==
- List of wadis of Oman
- List of mountains in the United Arab Emirates
- List of wadis of the United Arab Emirates
