= Jabal Al Harim =

Mountain in Oman

- Jabal Ḥārim
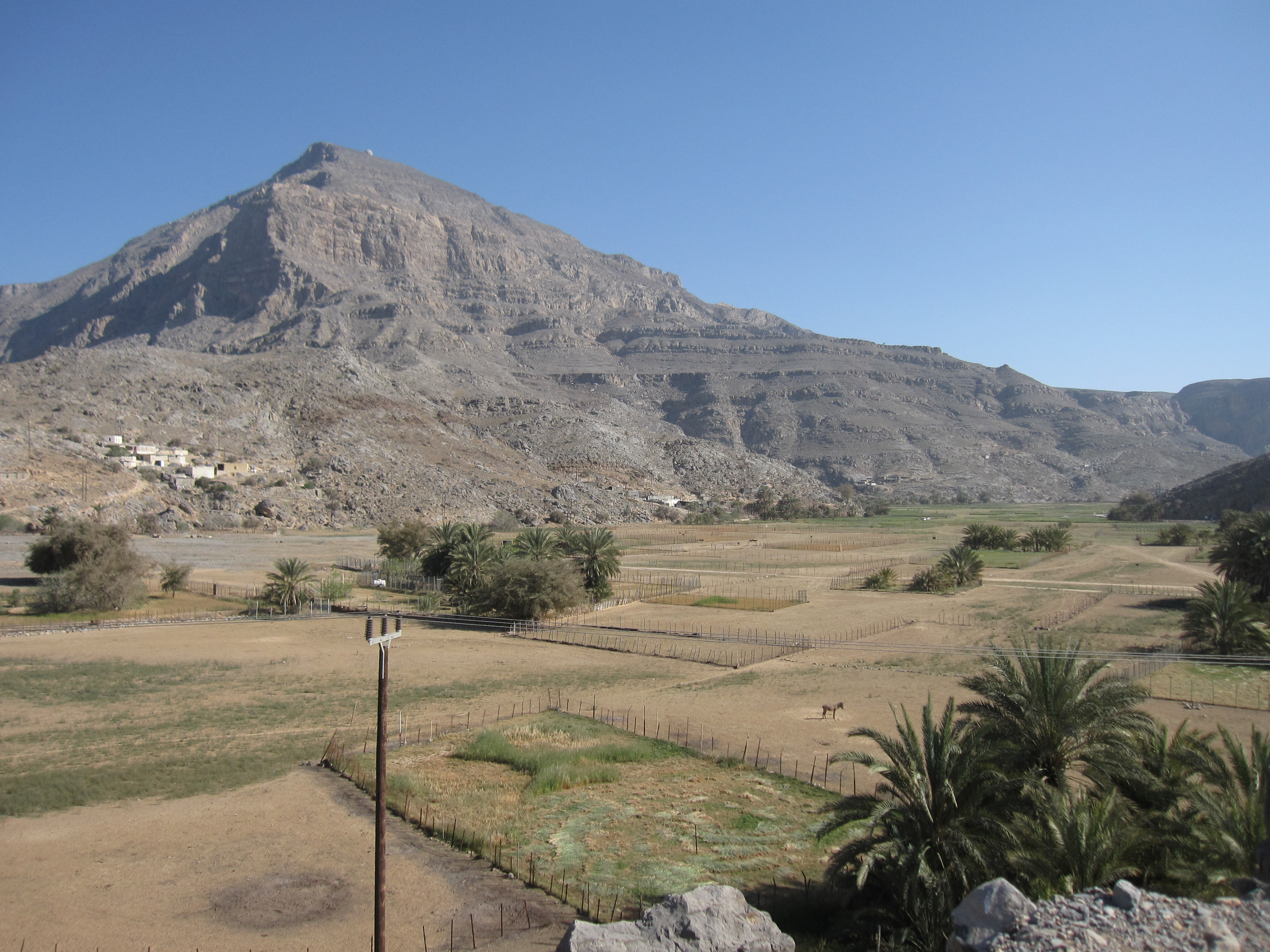
- View of Jebal Harim from the Green Valley

Highest point
- Elevation: 2,087 m (6,847 ft)
- Prominence: 1,727 m (5,666 ft)
- Isolation: 158.99 km (98.79 mi)
- Listing: Ultra, Ribu
- Coordinates: 25°58′35.0″N 56°13′56.0″E

Naming
- Native name: جبل حارم (Arabic)

Geography
- Location within Oman Location within Persian Gulf Location within West and Central Asia
- Location: Musandam Governorate
- Country: Oman
- Parent range: Hajar Mountains

Jabal Al Harim or Jebel Al Harim (Arabic: جبل حارم, romanized: Jabal Ḥārim) is a peak of the Hajar Mountains, located in Musandam Governorate in northern Oman.

It is the highest mountain in the Musandam Peninsula. It has an elevation of 2,087 m (6,847 ft), a prominence of 1,720 m (5,640 ft) and a considerable topographic isolation of 158.99 km (98.79 mi)

The mountain is located 2.5 km (1.6 mi) southeast of the town and farming area of As Sayh, and its summit is currently occupied by a radar and a military base, which is accessed via a winding dirt road, closed to the public 400 m (1,300 ft) before reaching the highest point.

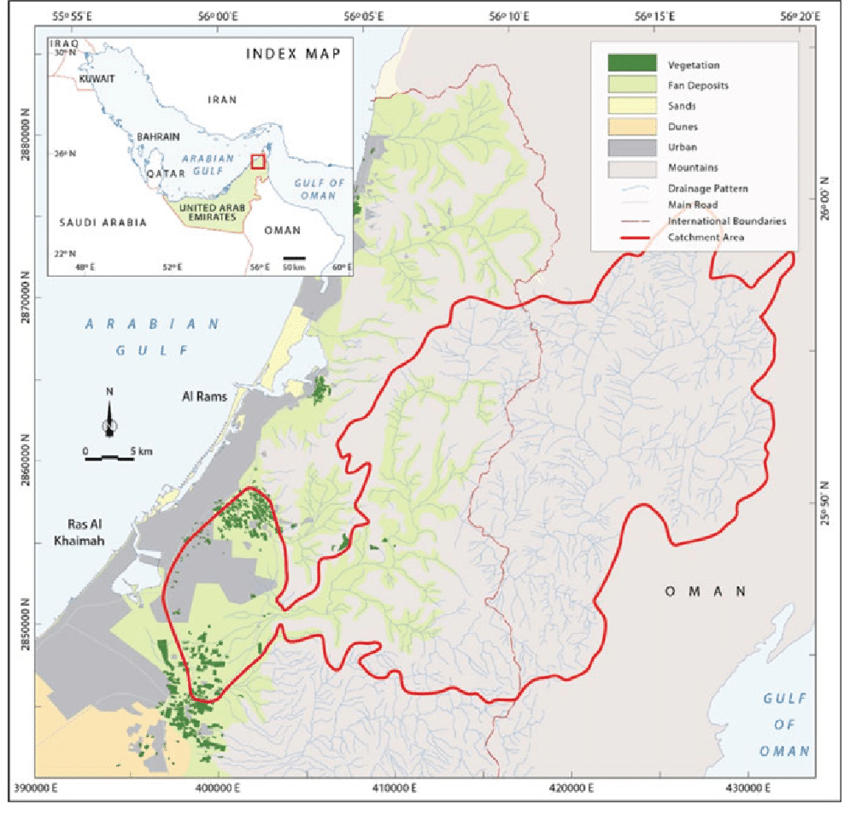
Location and catchment area of Wadi Bih, distributed between the territory of Oman and the UAE (Source: Ebraheem et al. 2012)

On the southern and eastern slopes of Jabal Al Harim are located the headwaters of the Wadi Bih, one of the most important wadis in the United Arab Emirates, which originates at this point in the Musandam Governorate (Oman), and expands to through an extensive drainage basin, with an area between 460 km^{2} (180 mi^{2}) and 483 km^{2} (186 mi^{2}), distributed between the territory of the UAE and Oman (approximately 172.32 km^{2} (66.53 mi^{2}) in the UAE and 298.26 km^{2} (115.16 mi^{2}) in Oman).

== Toponymy ==
Alternative names: Jabal Harim, Jebal Al Harim, Jabal al Harim, Jabal al Ḩarīm, Jebal Harim, Jebel Harim, Jabal Ḥārim, Jabal Ḩārim, Jabal Ra'an al-Harim, Shaam Peak, Shuam Peak, jbl harm, جبل حارم

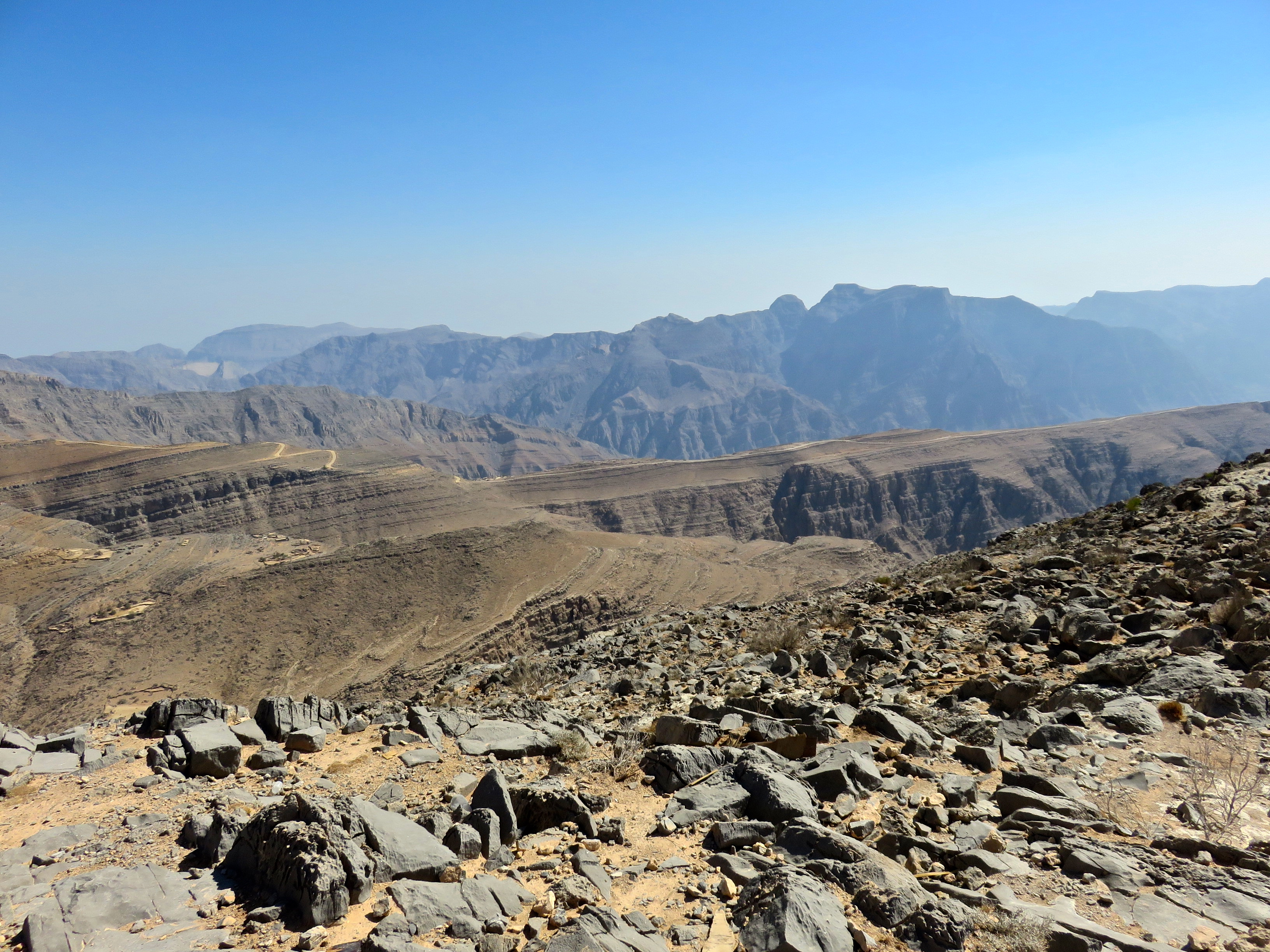
Jabal al Harim. Ru'us al-Jibal, Musandam Peninsula

The name of Jabal Al Harim (with the spelling Jabal al Ḩarīm) appears recorded in the documents and maps prepared between 1950 and 1960 by the British Arabist, cartographer, military officer and diplomat Julian F. Walker, on the occasion of the work carried out for the establishment of the borders between the then called Trucial States, later completed by the Ministry of Defense of the United Kingdom, with maps at a scale of 1:100,000 published in 1971, and in other previous documents kept in The National Archives, London.

== Population ==
The geographical area of Jabal al Harim was historically populated by the semi-nomadic Shihuh tribe, section of Bani Hadiyah (Arabic: بني هدية), one of the two main sections of the tribe, which occupied, among other territories, the tribal areas of As Sayḩ and Khanazirah.

== See also ==
- List of mountains in Oman
- List of wadis of Oman
- List of mountains in the United Arab Emirates
- List of ultras of West Asia
- List of wadis of the United Arab Emirates
- Middle East
  - Eastern Arabia
