= Musandam Peninsula =

Musandam Peninsula جَزِيْرَة مُسَنْدَم رَأْس مُسَنْدَم
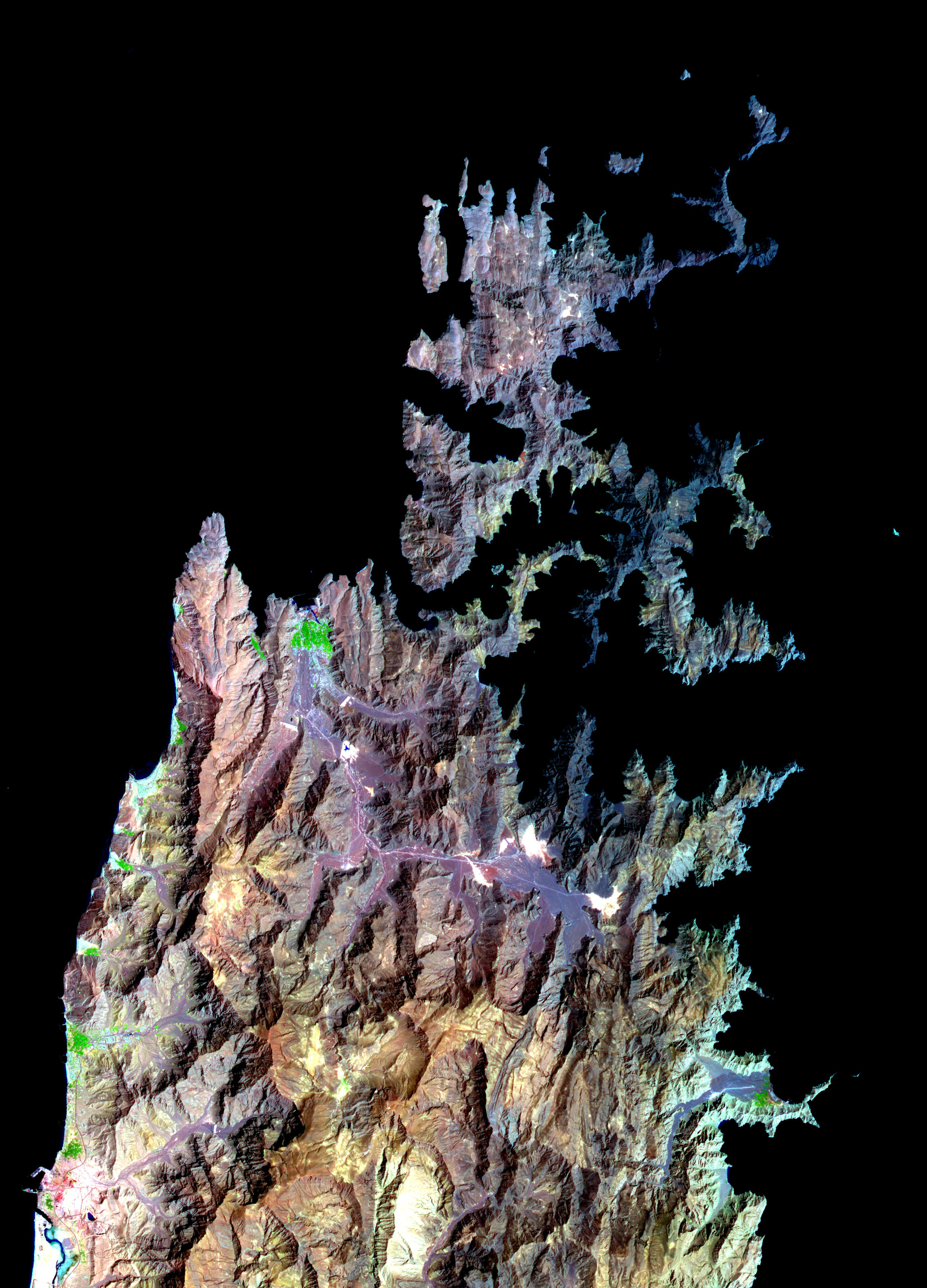
- The peninsula as seen from space. Al-Khasab to the north (top) shown in green, is contrasted between the more subtle rainbow tones of the surrounding rock in this false-colour image. The term Khasab refers to the fertility of the soil.
- Interactive map of Musandam Peninsula
- Governorates of Oman and Emirates of the United Arab Emirates: Musandam Governorate (Oman); Emirate of Ras Al Khaimah (UAE)

The Musandam Peninsula, (Note: Arabic: جَزِيْرَة مُسَنْدَم \ رَأْس مُسَنْدَم, romanized: Jazīrat Musandam / Raʾs Musandam) or Ruus Al Jibal, (Note: Arabic: رُؤُوْس ٱلْجِبَال, romanized: Ruʾūs al-Jibāl Capes of the Mountains) is a mountainous, northeastern extension of the Arabian Peninsula, lying between the Persian Gulf to the west and the Gulf of Oman to the east; the connecting Strait of Hormuz lies to the north. Political control is divided between the United Arab Emirates and Oman.

== Geography ==
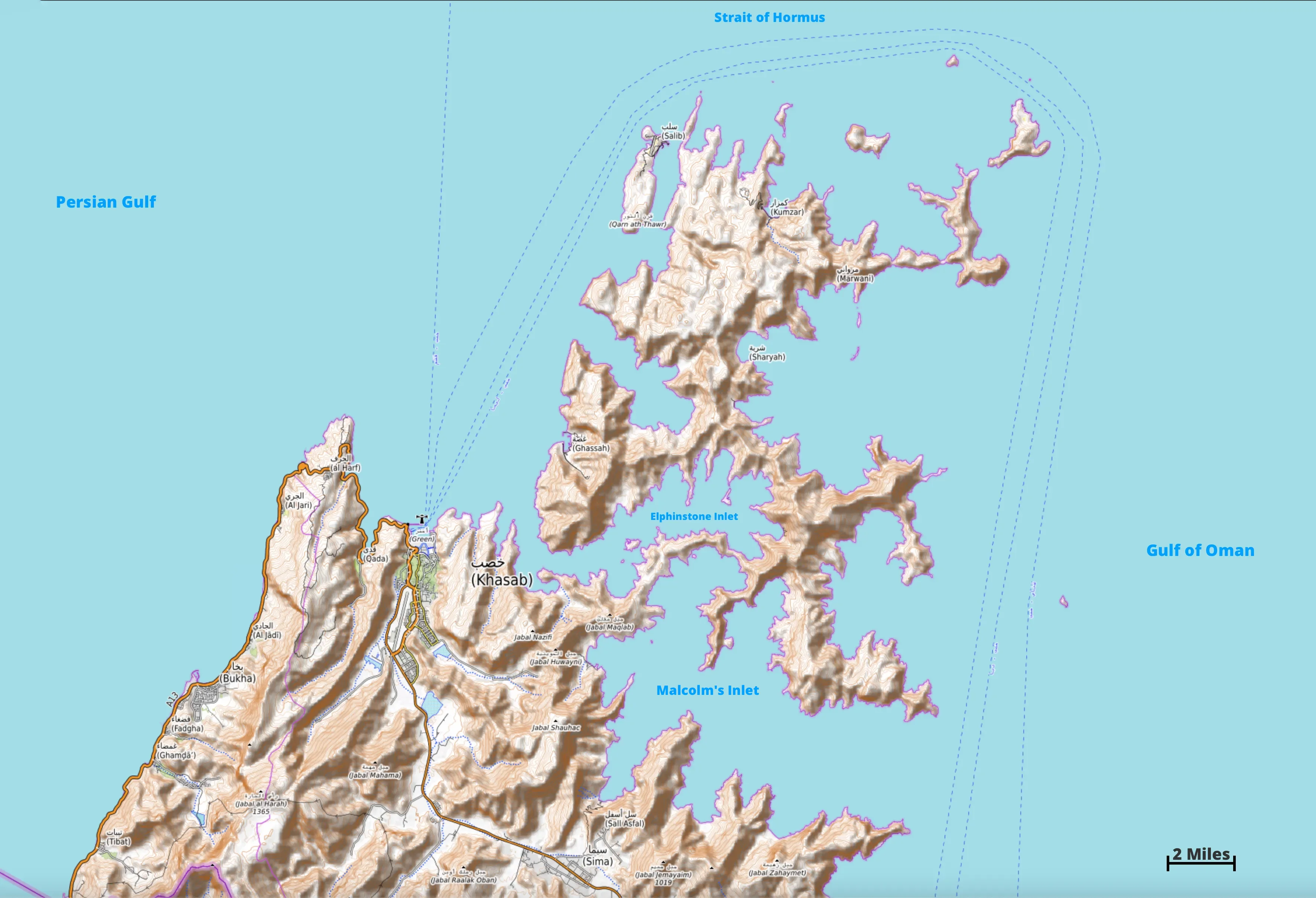
Topographic map of the tip of the Musandam Peninsula, including the sinuous coast north and west of the isthmus between Elphinstone Inlet and Malcolm's Inlet

The peninsula lies to the south of the Strait of Hormuz, between the Persian Gulf and the Gulf of Oman.

It is inhabited by the Bedouin Shihuh tribe and the Iranic Kumzari people.

It is mainly governed by Oman as the Musandam Governorate with certain parts governed by the United Arab Emirates, including Ras Al Khaimah and parts of Dibba.

Land features include the Western Hajar Mountains. Since these are the northernmost of the Hajar range, they and the peninsula are referred to as Ruʾūs al-Jibāl (Arabic: رُؤُوْس ٱلْجِبَال, romanized: Capes of the Mountains). The largest wadi in Musandam is Wadi Bih, which forms the central drainage basin. The highest mountain in Musandam, and Ru'us al Jibal, is Jebel Harim.

=== Climate ===
During winter, the region can be fairly cool, particularly the mountains of Jais, Yanas and Mebrah.

== Environment ==
Fauna include the Ruus al Jibal fan-footed gecko, Arabian tahr and caracal. It is unknown if the Arabian leopard is still present.

=== Important Bird Area ===
The mountainous northern end of the peninsula has been designated an Important Bird Area (IBA) by BirdLife International because it supports significant populations of bird species, whether resident, breeding, wintering or on passage. These include pallid scops-owl, plain leaf-warbler, hooded, variable, Hume's and red-tailed wheatears, and pale rockfinch.

The islands scattered around the tip of the peninsula are in a separate IBA because of their importance for seabirds, including red-billed tropicbird, Persian shearwater, Socotra cormorant and bridled tern.

== History ==
In the past, the region was unstable and was repeatedly invaded by Persian empires such as the Achaemenid Empire and the Sassanian Empire. These empires then declined until the Islamic era arrived.

=== Modern era ===
In the modern era, occupation of the Peninsula continued. In 1507, Afonso de Albuquerque captured key areas along the Omani coast, including Sur, Muscat, and Khasab. From then, until 1650, the Portuguese used Khasab as a supply point for the dates trade as well as a safe passage for their ships in the region. By the early 1600s, native tribes began asserting more control, and the Portuguese presence in the area dwindled. Three decades after the Safavids retook Hormuz from the Portuguese in 1622, the Ya'rubids, the ruling house of Oman, occupied the Musandam Peninsula first under Imam Nasir bin Murshid, then completed by a new Imam, Sultan bin Saif, south of Hormuz Island, which gives the strait between the peninsula and island its modern name.

In the 19th century, the British occupied the area as part of the Trucial States, and in 1891, Muscat and Oman became a British Protectorate; however, the Khasab region, not suitable for port nor hospitable for settlement due to a harsh climate, was not developed. In the late 20th century, the UAE was formed, with most sheikdoms in the area joining, except notably Ras Al Khaimah. However, in 1972, the Emirate entered the UAE, leading to discussions on the Emirati-Omani border eventually settling on the Musandam Peninsula being granted to Oman.

== In popular culture ==
In The Secret of the Swordfish, a secret underground British military base lies beneath the Musandam Peninsula.

== Gallery ==
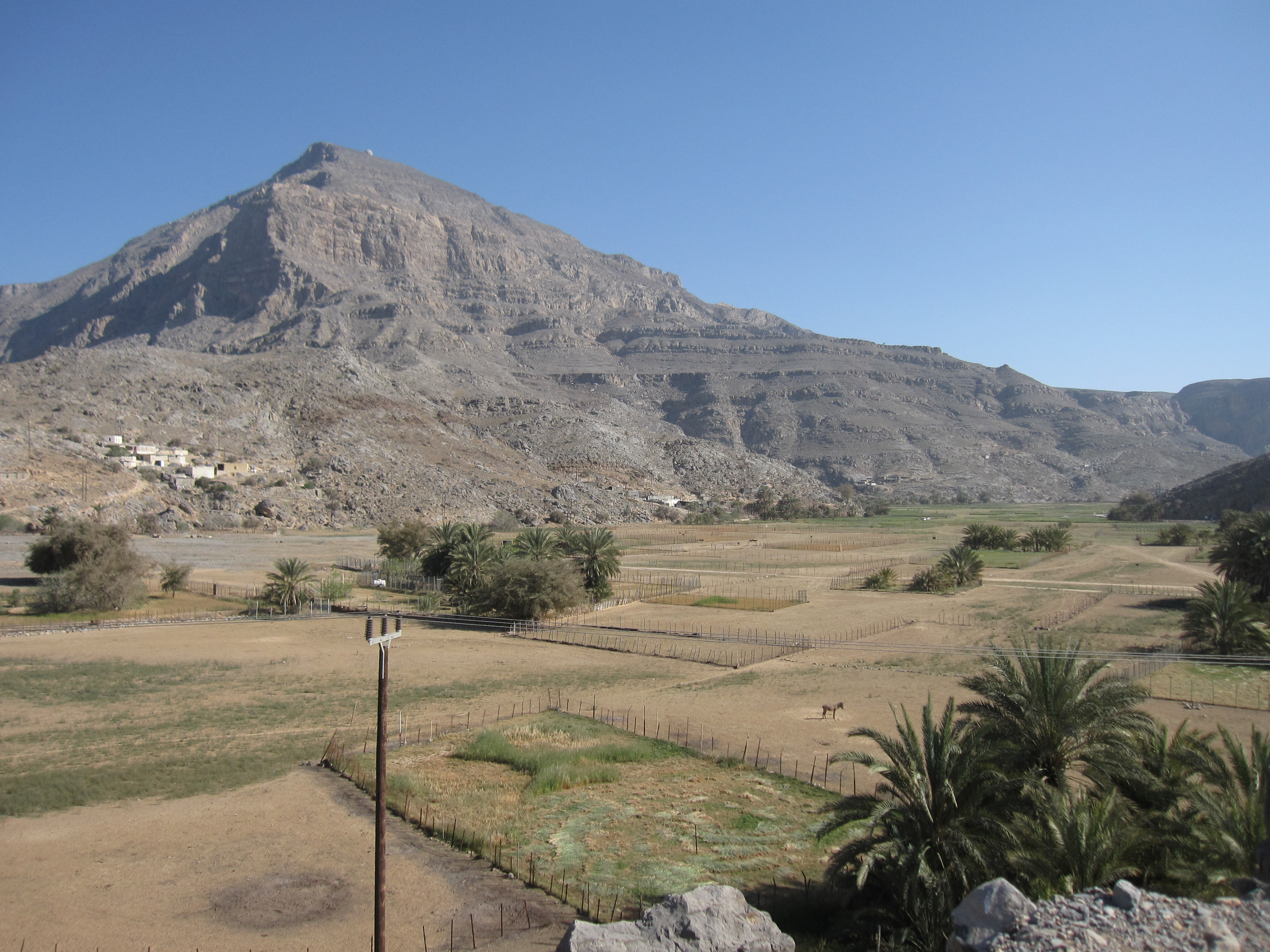
View of Jabal Harim from the Green Valley, March 2013

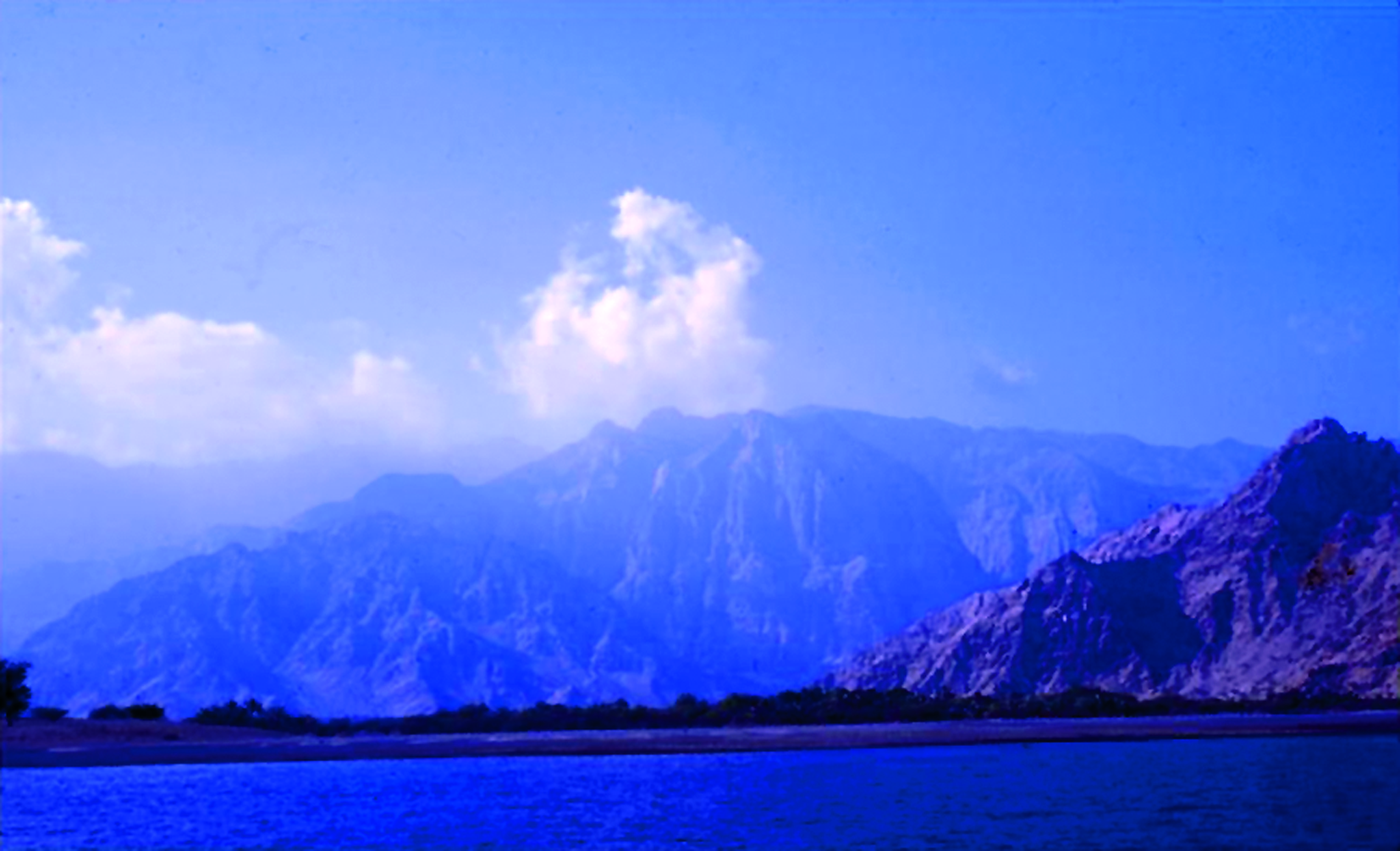
View of the mountains of Musandam, December 1971

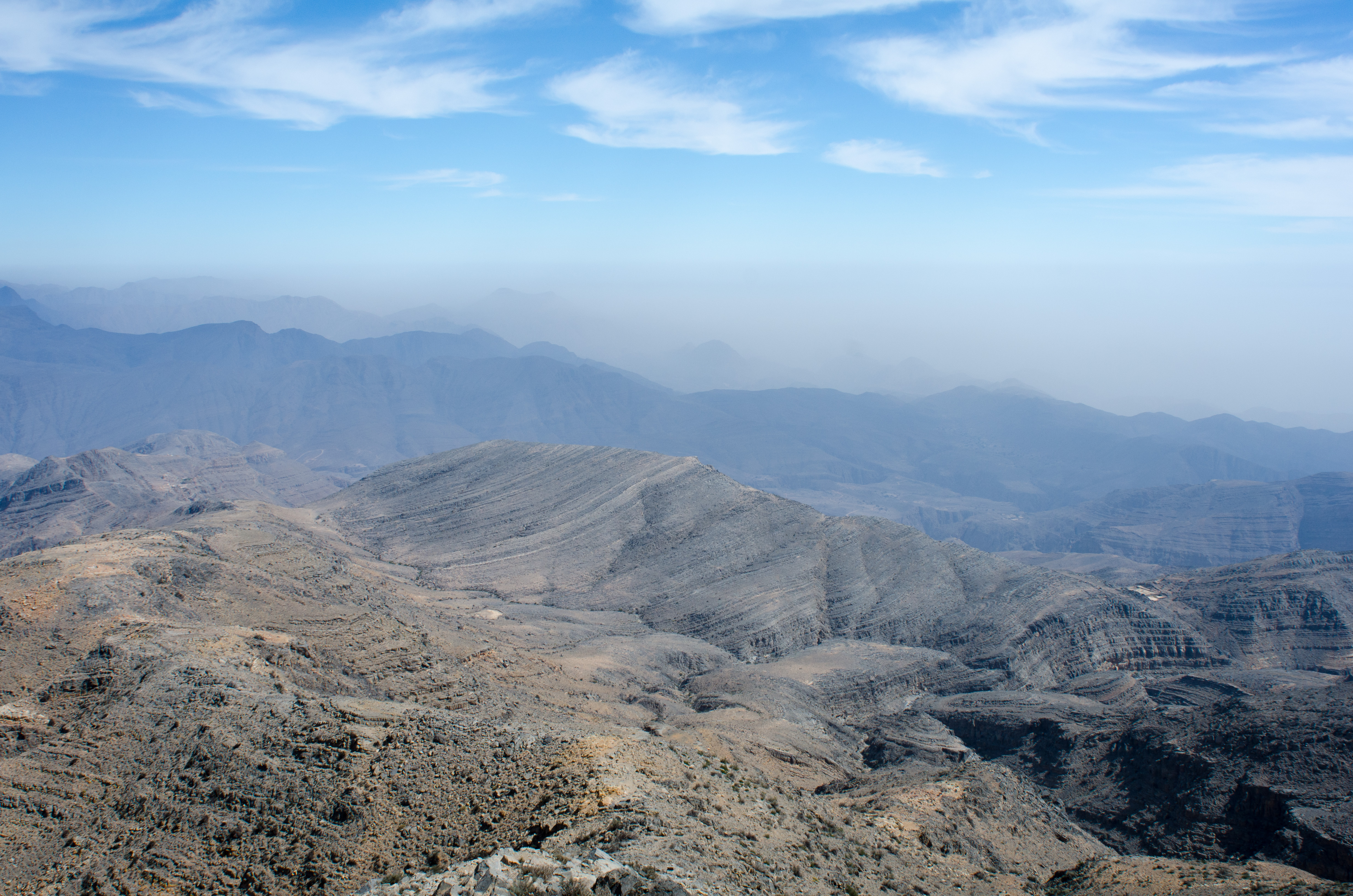
View of the Ru'us al-Jibal from Jabal Qihwi

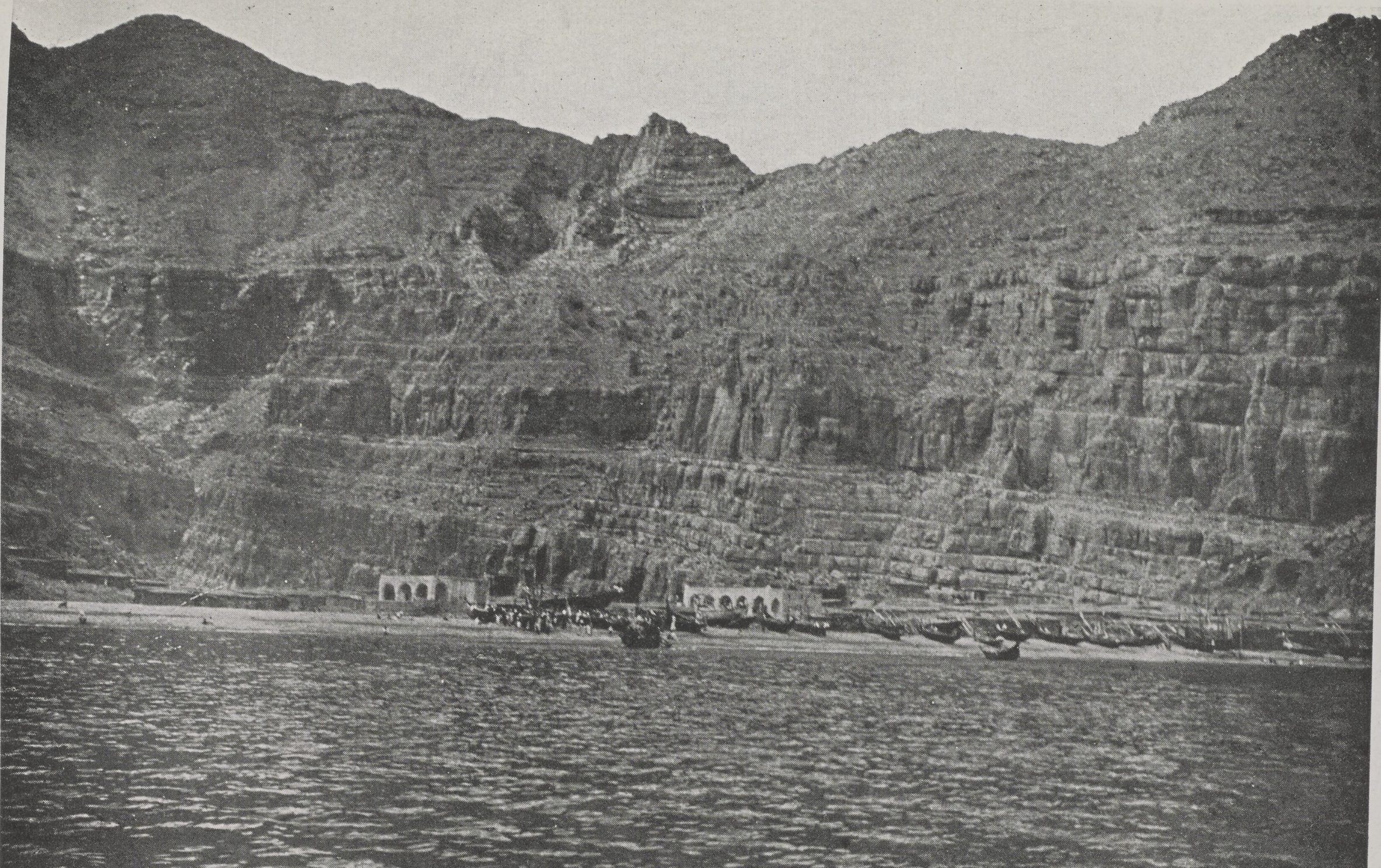
The mountainous area of Kumzar, c. 1908

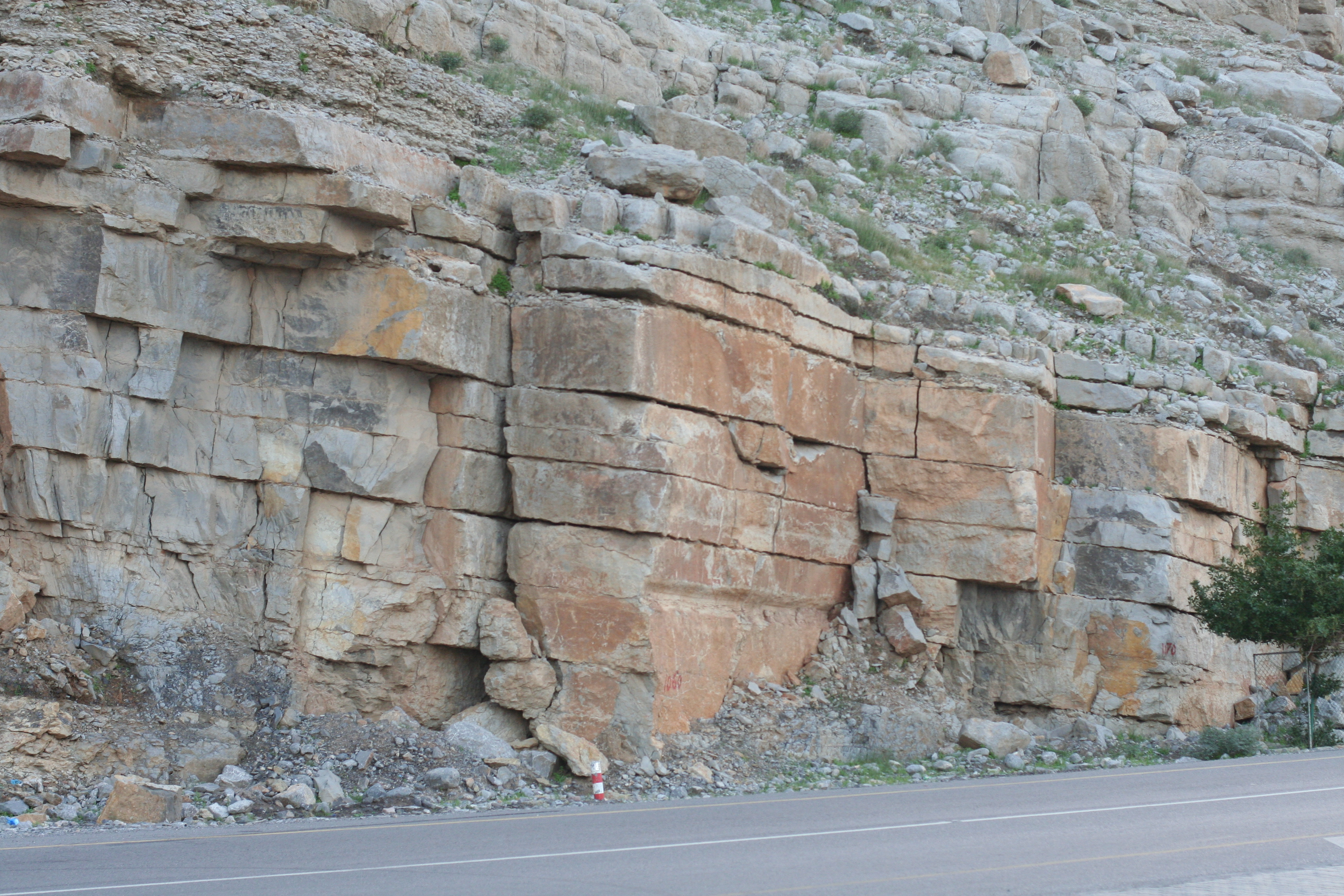
Sedimentary rock layers near Khasab in Musandam Governorate, Oman

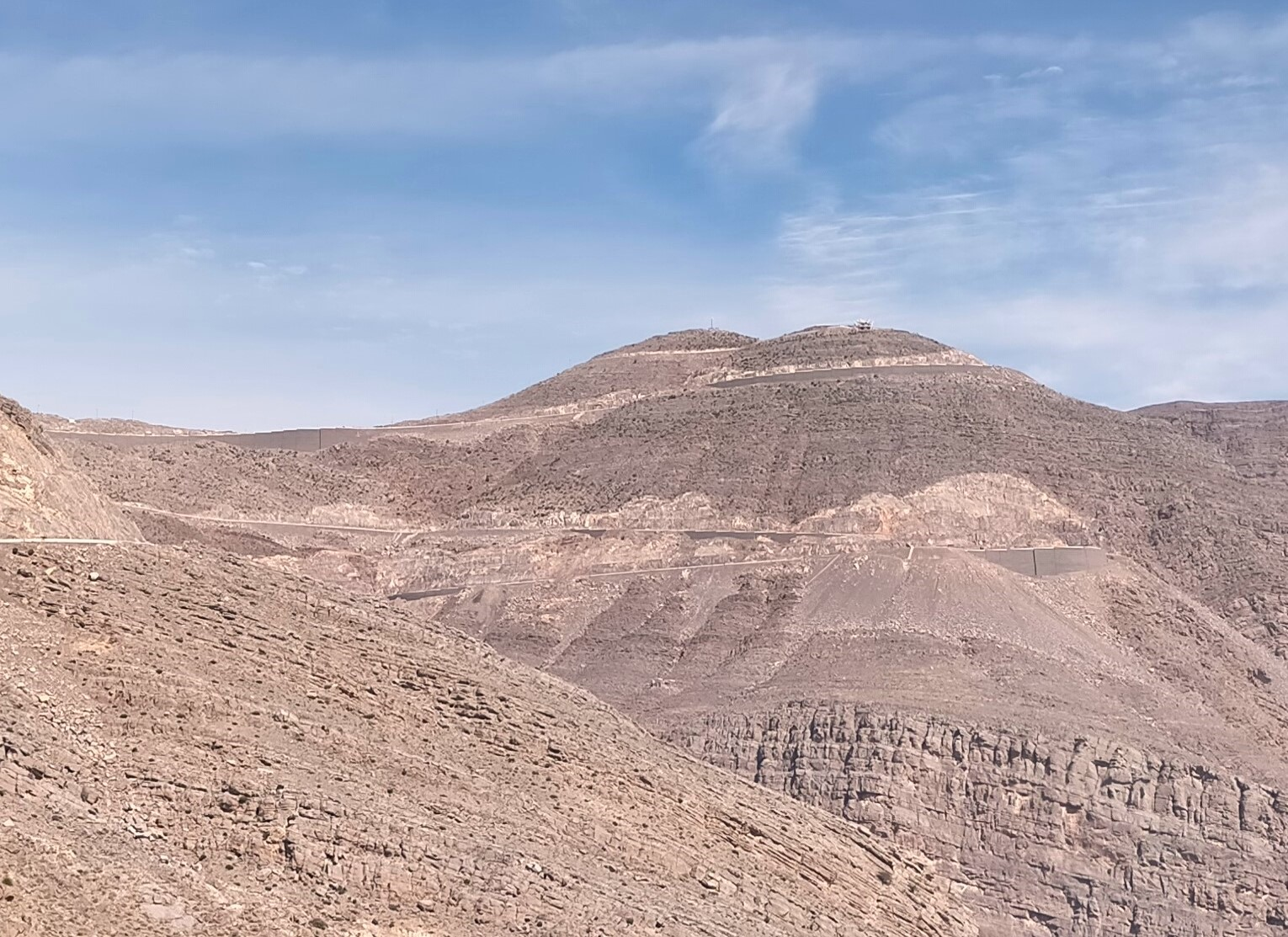
Jabal ar Raḩraḩ (1,676 m), the UAE's highest mountain, near Ras Al Khaimah

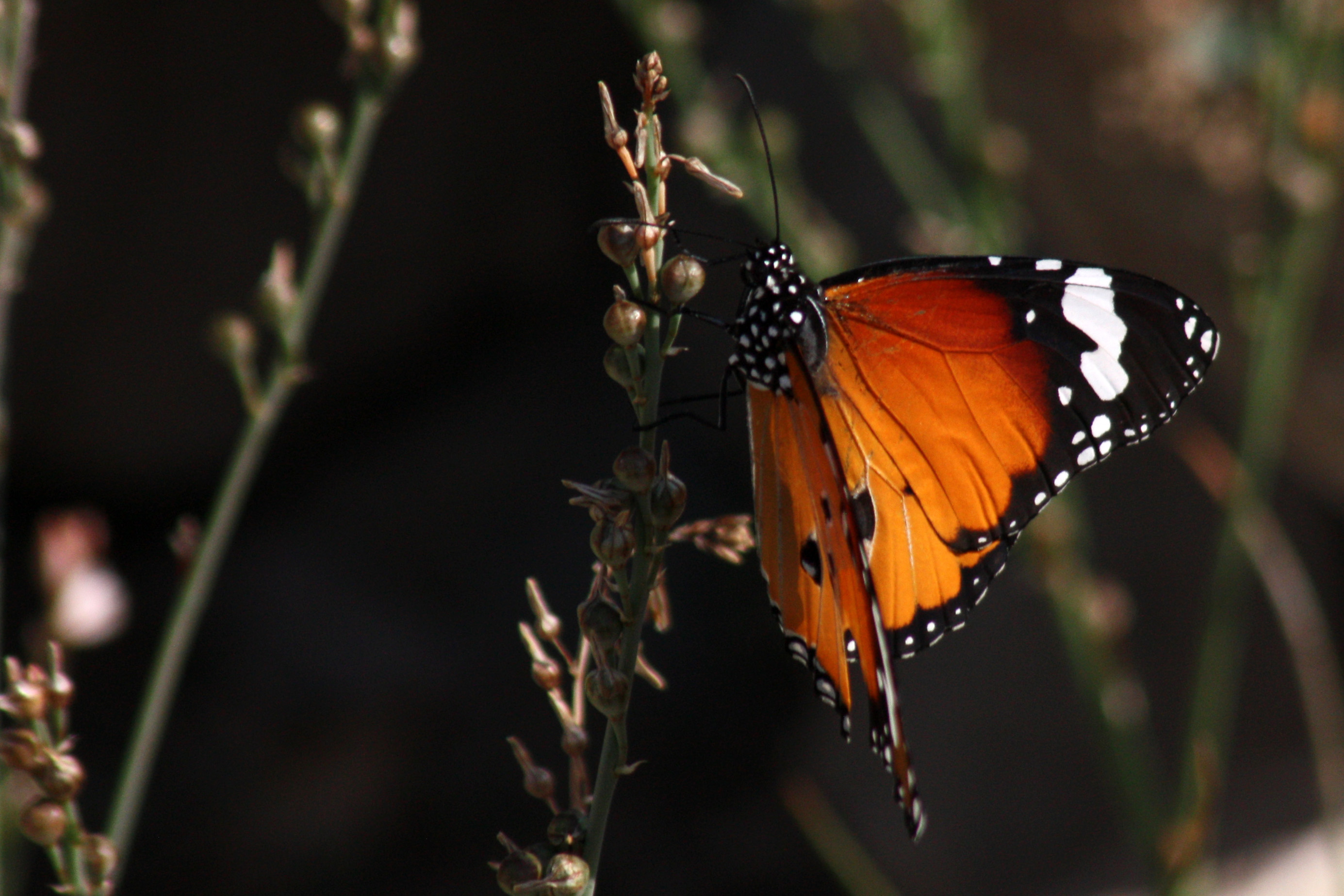
African monarch butterfly (Danaus chrysippus) in Zhighy Bay, Musandam Governorate

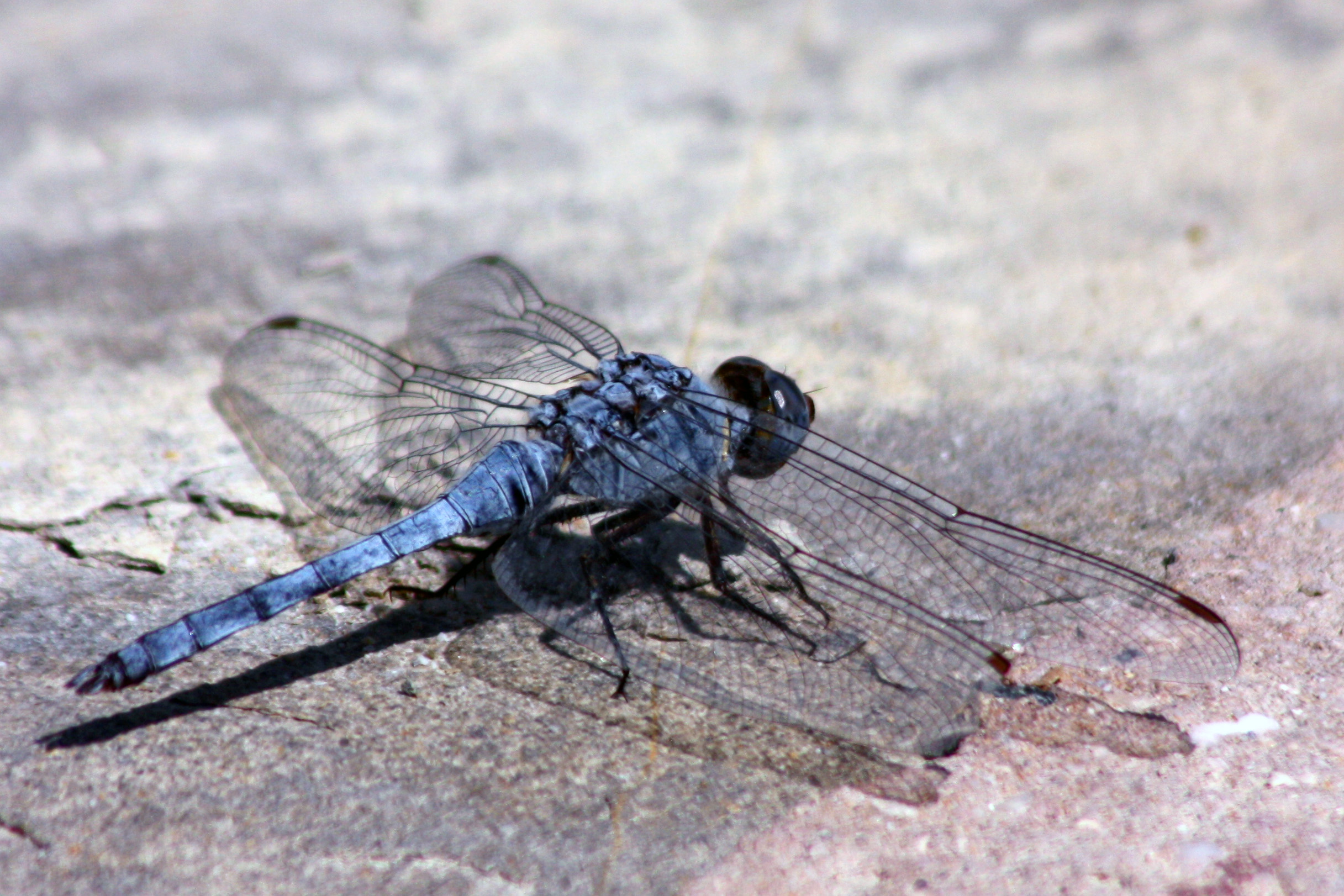
Blue basker dragonfly (Urothemis edwardsii)

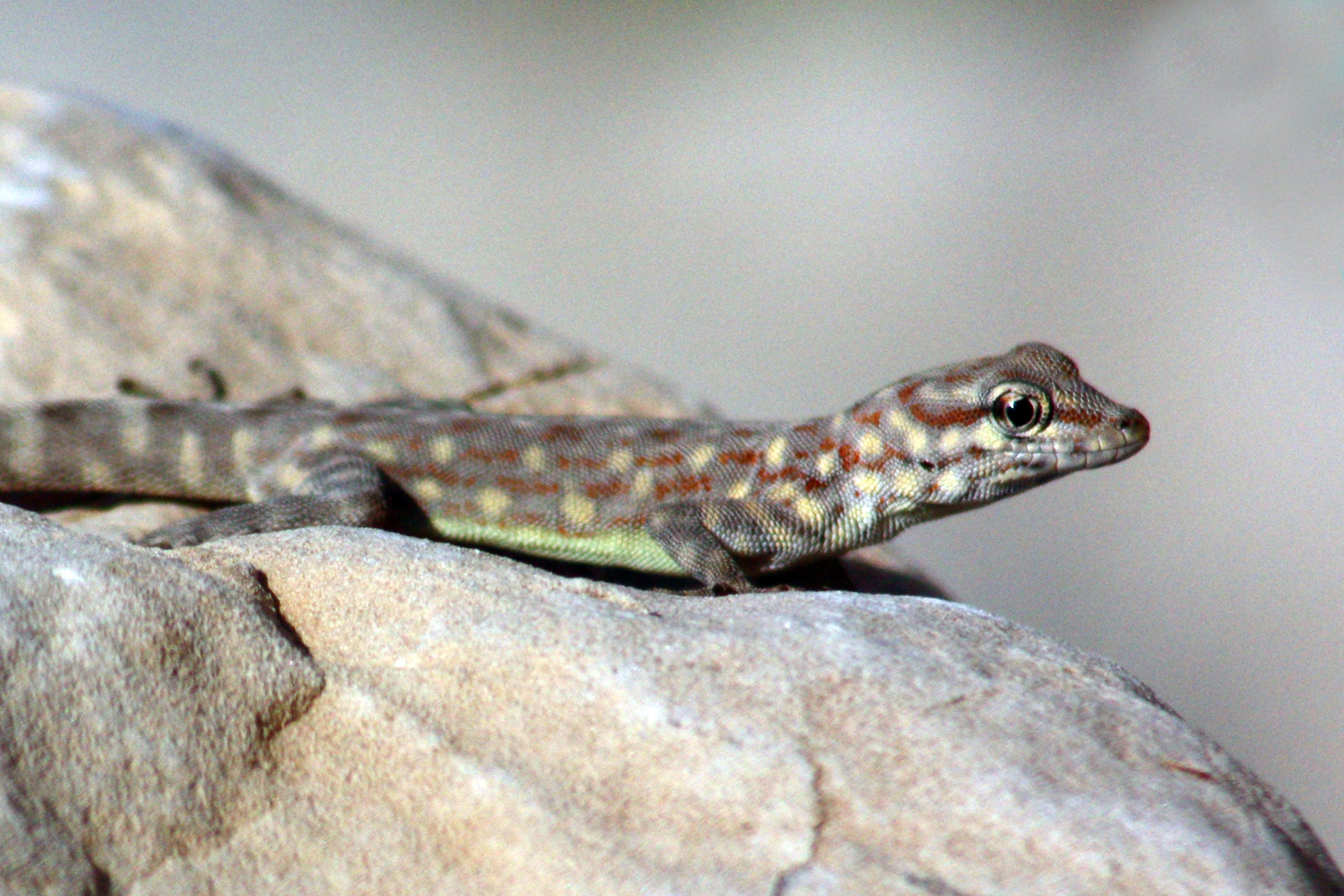
Rock semaphore gecko (Pristurus rupestris)

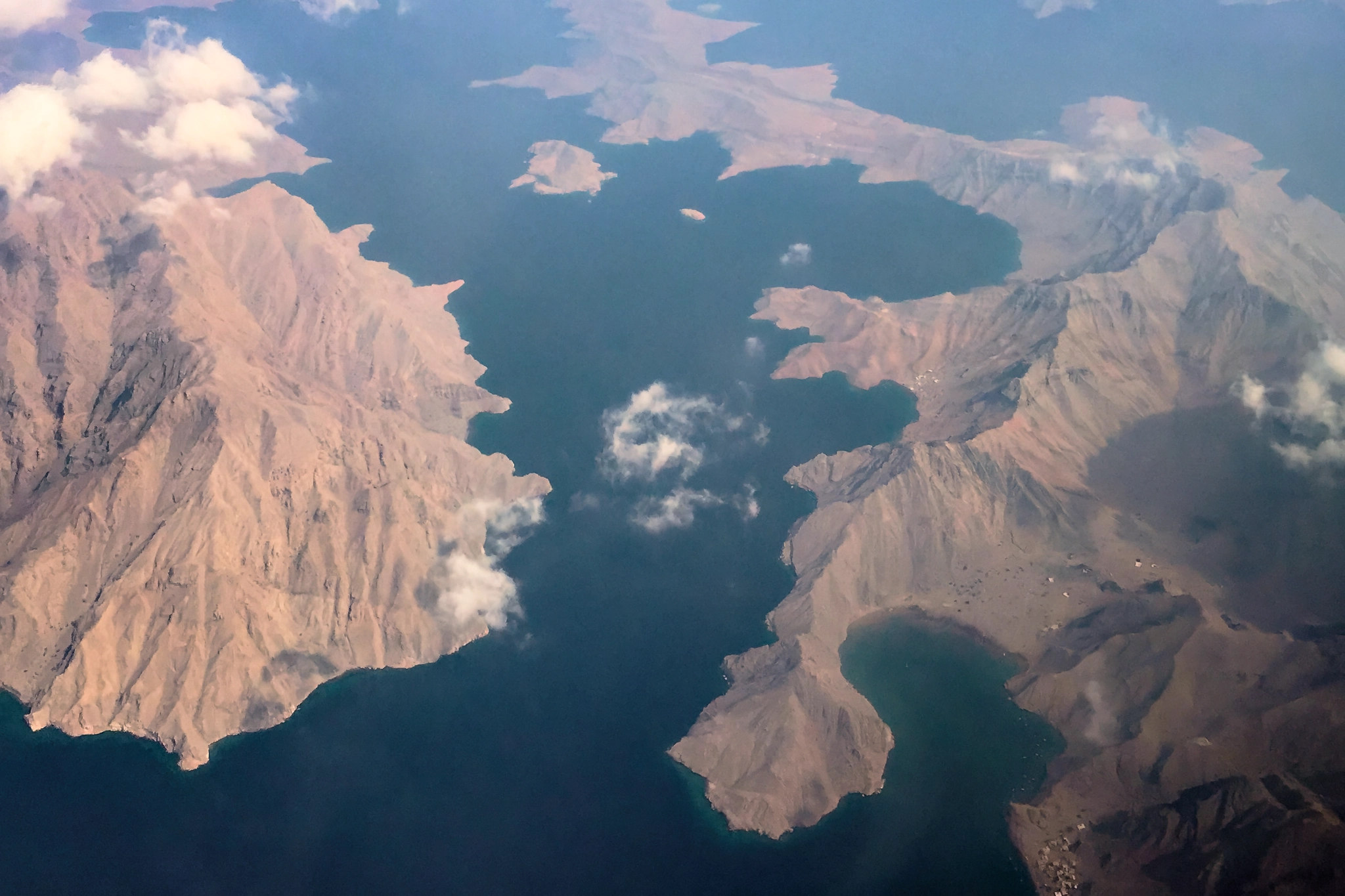
Elphinstone Inlet with a small piece of land separating it from Malcolm's Inlet

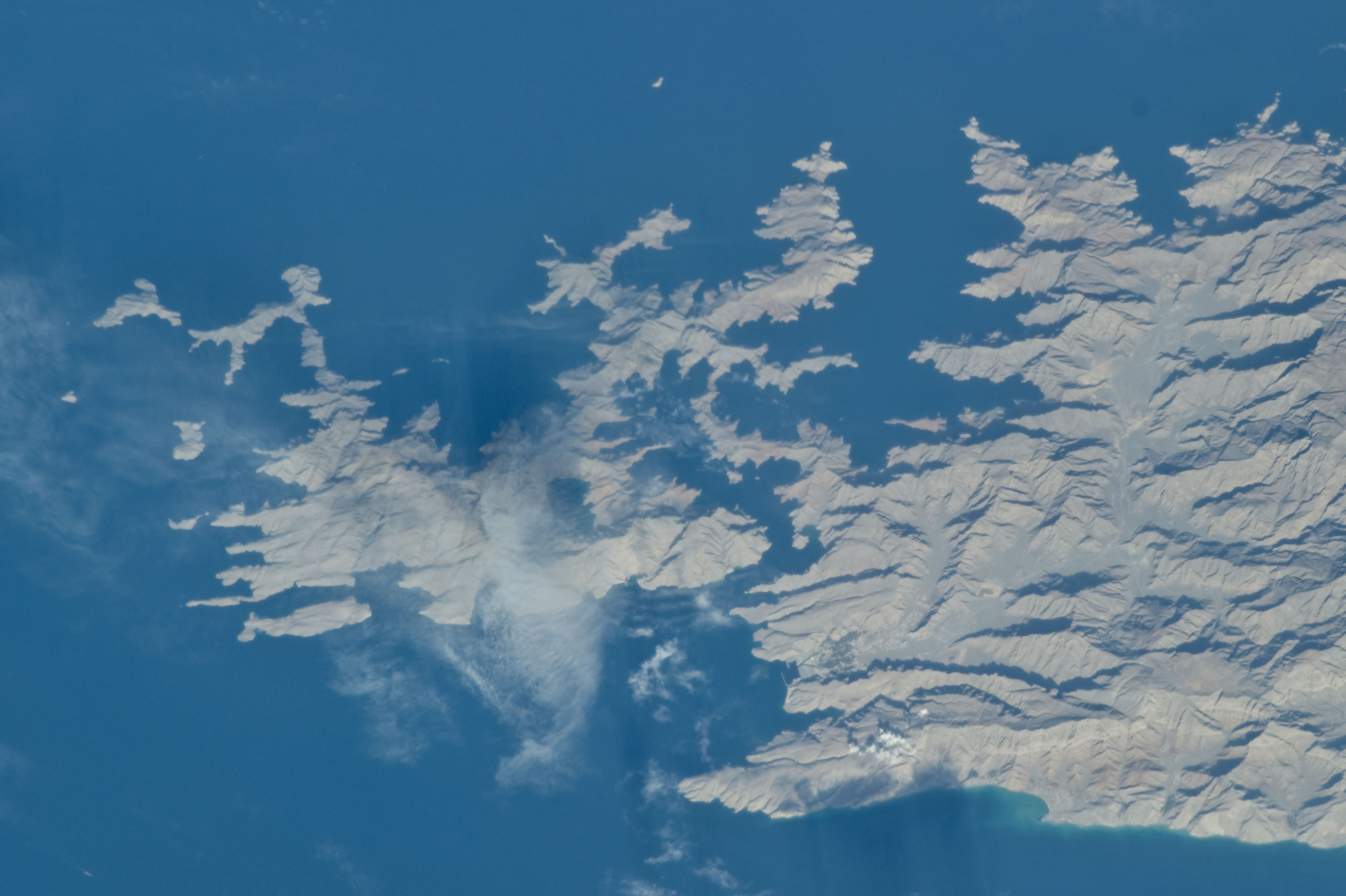

== See also ==
- Elphinstone Inlet — fjords on the Musandam Peninsula
