= List of wadis of Oman =

This is a list of wadis in Oman arranged by drainage basin.

== Persian Gulf ==
- Wadi Bih / Wādī Al-Bayḥ / Wādī al Bīḩ / Wadi Al Biyah, in Musandam (Oman) and Ras Al Khaimah (UAE). Coordinates: 25.7672712, 56.0255513
- Wadi Hanah/ Wādī Ḩanah / Wādī Ḩanā, in Musandam. Coordinates: 26.22972, 56.21389
- Wadi Homudh / Wādī Homudh, in Musandam. Coordinates: 26.20889, 56.27639
- Wadi Khabkhab / Wādī Khabb, in Musandam. Coordinates: 26.20878, 56.27226
- Wadi Khasab / Wādī Khaşab, in Musandam. Coordinates: 26.1984, 56.24634
- Wadi Qada / Wadi Qadah / Wadi Qidah, in Musandam. Coordinates: 26.19444, 56.22194
- Wadi Naqab / Wādī Naqab, in Musandam (Oman) and Ras Al Khaimah (UAE). Coordinates: 25.6987632, 56.0053841

== Gulf of Oman ==
- Wadi Abd ar Rahman / Wādī ‘Abd ar Raḩmān, in Al Batinah North. Coordinates: 24.629722, 56.529442
- Wadi al Abyad / Wādī al Abyaḑ / Wadi Al Abyadh, in Al Batinah South. Coordinates: 23.6819,57.70161
- Wadi al Arabiyin / Wādī al ‘Arabiyīn / Wādī Hārabīn, in Muscat. Coordinates: 23.082122, 59.058047
- Wadi Bani `Umar al Gharbi / Wādī Banī ‘Umar al Gharbī, in Al Batinah North. Coordinates: 24.50833,56.56833
- Wadi Bimmah / Wādī Bamah, in Muscat. Coordinates: 22.99109,59.14168
- Wadi Dayqah
- Wadi Fins / Wādī Fins, in Muscat. Coordinates: 22.92386,59.21205
- Wadi Hatta, in Al Batinah North. Coordinates: 24.78465,56.45878
- Wadi al Hawasinah / Wādī al Ḩawāsinah, in Al Batinah North. Coordinates: 23.59636,56.97285
- Wadi Hawir / Wādī Ḩāwir, in Muscat. Coordinates: 23.14167, 58.99944
- Wadi Hilam / Wādī Ḩilm / Wādī Ḩalam, in Ash Sharqiyah South Governorate. Coordinates: 22.70116, 59.38004
- Wadi Jizzi / Wādī al Jizī, in Al Batinah North. Coordinates: 24.33465,56.61097
- Wadi Khuwayrat/ Wādī al Khuwayrāt, in Al Batinah South. Coordinates: 23.70891,57.90157
- Wadi Khabb Shamsi / Wādī Khab ash Shāmsī, in Musandam. Coordinates: 25.6489475, 56.2689386
- Wadi Mayh / Wādī Mayḩ, in Muscat. Coordinates: 23.52917,58.66222
- Wadi Mijlas / Wadi Majlas / Wadi Mijlan, in Muscat. Coordinates: 23.2777, 58.91933
- Wadi Nabr / Wādī Nabr, in Al Batinah North. Coordinates: 24.56923,56.5679
- Wadi Rafsah / Wādī Rafşah, in Ash Sharqiyah South Governorate. Coordinates: 22.52456,59.45298
- Wadi Samail
- Wadi Sarami / Wādī aş Şarāmī, in Al Batinah North. Coordinates: 24.12111,56.85778
- Wadi Shab / Wadi Shabb / Wādī ash Shābb, en Ash Sharqiyah South Governorate. Coordinates: 22.83922,59.24526
- Wadi Suq / Wādī Sūq, in Al Batinah North. Coordinates: 24.43987,56.64619
- Wadi Tiwi / Wādī Ţīwī, in Muscat. Coordinates: 22.82212,59.2579
- Wadi al Wudayyat / Wādī al Wudayyāt, in Al Batinah North. Coordinates: 24.76637,56.46426
- Wadi az Zarbin / Wadi Zarabin, in Musandam. Coordinates: 25.9520357, 56.4247748

== Arabian Sea ==
- Wadi Ainain / Wādī ‘Aynaynah, in Al Wusta Governorate (Oman). Coordinates: 18.29122,56.48212
- Wadi al Batha (Oman) (Batha River)
  - Wadi Bani Khalid
- Wadi Andam
  - Wadi Matam
    - Wadi al Ithli
  - Wadi Mahram
- Wadi Halfayn
- Wadi Quiam
- Wadi Tarban
- Wadi Qilfah
- Wadi Gharm
- Wadi Haytam
- Wadi Ghadun (Arabian Sea)
- Wadi Watif

== Rub' al Khali ==
- Wadi Dhank / Wadi Danak, in Al Buraimi Governorate. Coordinates: 23.46667,55.83333
- Wadi Khuwaybah
- Umm al Samim
  - Wadi al Ayn
    - Wadi Rafash
  - Wadi Aswad
- Wādī al ‘Umayrī / Wādī ‘Amairi, in Ad Dakhiliyah Governorate. Coordinates: 21.86395,56.6154
    - Wadi Haniyah
    - Wadi Ghul
  - Wadi Musallim / Wadi Musallam, in Ad Dakhiliyah Governorate. Coordinates: 21.5198,56.4886
- Wadi Majhul
- Wadi Bin Khawtar / Wādī Bin Khūţār, in Dhofar Governorate. Coordinates: 19.28494, 54.38458
  - Wadi Arah
  - Wadi Qitbit / Wādī Qatbīt, in Dhofar Governorate. Coordinates: 18.84945,55.01067
    - Wadi Jazal / Wādī Juzayl, in Dhofar Governorate. Coordinates: 17.54406,54.21537
  - Wadi Maharib / Wādī Maharub, in Dhofar Governorate. Coordinates: 18.86667, 54.33333
  - Wadi Umm al Hayt (Wadi Hayta)
  - Wadi Dawkah / Wādī Dawkah, in Dhofar Governorate. Coordinates: 18.66667,53.86667
  - Wadi Ghadun / Wādī Ghudūn (Rub' al Khali), in Dhofar Governorate. Coordinates: 18.53333, 53.68333
  - Wadi Aydim
    - Wadi al Madi
      - Wadi Stum
  - Wadi Shihan
- Nukhdat Fasad
- Wadi Mitan / Wadi Maytan, in Al Wusta Governorate (Oman) and Yemen. Coordinates: 18.70913,52.58488

== Interior ==
- Wadi Bani `Umar / Wādī Banī ‘Umar, tributary, in Al Batinah North. Coordinates: 24.40608,56.44154
- Wadi Hiyar / Wādī Hiyār, tributary of Wadi Khabb Shamsi, in Musandam. Coordinates: 25.65351,56.22727
- Wadi al Jalbat / Wadi al Jilbat, tributary of Wadi Bih, in Musandam. Coordinates: 25.92492,56.27011
- Wadi al Khabbayn / Wādī al Khabbayn, tributary of Wadi Bih, in Musandam. Coordinates: 25.79333,56.16649
- Wadi Khabb Naqbi / Wādī Khabb Naqbī, tributary of Wadi Khabb Shamsi, in Musandam. Coordinates: 25.65806,56.22583
- Wadi Kitnah / Kitna (tributary of Wadi Jizzi), in Al Buraimi. Coordinates: 24.13333,56.21667
- Wadi Qada'ah / Wādī Qada‘ah (tributary of Wadi Bih), in Musandam (Oman) and Ras Al Khaimah (UAE) Coordinates: 25.7822135, 56.0627825
- Wadi Rimth / Wādī Rimth, tributary of Wadi Bih, in Musandam. Coordinates: 25.92569,56.27464
- Wadi as Sabban / Wādī aş Şabbān, tributary of Wadi Khabb Shamsi, in Musandam. Coordinates: 25.65721,56.22952
- Wadi as Samrat / Wadi as Simirat, tributary of Wadi Bih, in Musandam. Coordinates: 25.91594,56.25005
- Wadi Zibat / Wādī Zaybāt, tributary of Wadi Bih, in Musandam. Coordinates: 25.79335,56.16593

== See also ==
- List of wadis of the United Arab Emirates
- List of wadis of Yemen
- List of mountains in Oman
- List of mountains in the United Arab Emirates
