= List of cities in the United Arab Emirates =

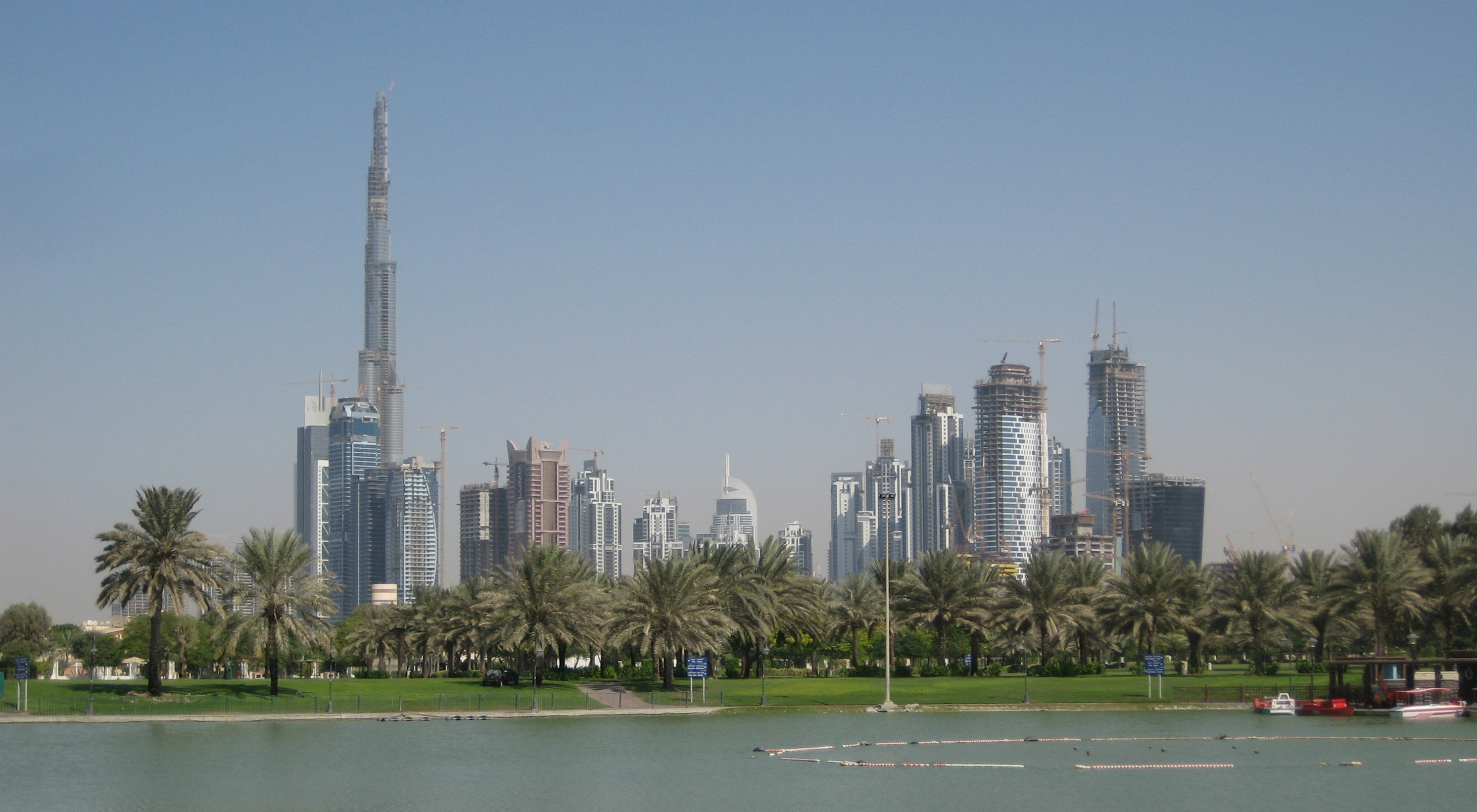
Dubai, the most populous city in the United Arab Emirates

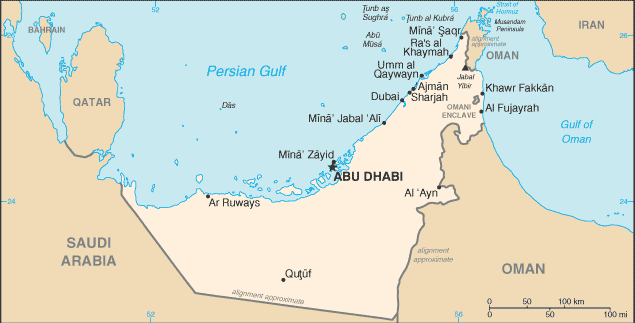
Map of the United Arab Emirates

The table below shows a list of every city in the UAE with a population of at least 10,000, listed in descending order. The capitals are shown in bold. The population numbers are of the cities, and not the emirates, often with the same name. There is also an additional list of the rest of the populated settlements in the UAE under 10,000 (not listed in descending order).

== Largest cities ==
**Emirate capital and largest city**
**Federal Capital**

Nº	City	Population	Emirate	Location
1	**Dubai**	3,944,751	Dubai	25.263056°N 55.297222°E
2	**Abu Dhabi**	2,189,860	Abu Dhabi	24.466667°N 54.366667°E
3	**Sharjah**	1,600,000	Sharjah	25.3575°N 55.390833°E
4	Al Ain	846,747	Abu Dhabi	24.2075°N 55.744722°E
5	**Ajman**	565,767	Ajman	25.413611°N 55.445556°E
6	Jebel Ali	540,732	Dubai	25.01126°N 55.06116°E
7	**Ras Al Khaimah**	191,753	Ras Al Khaimah	25.783333°N 55.95°E
8	**Fujairah**	121,538	Fujairah	25.121927°N 56.346876°E
9	Khor Fakkan	61,936	Sharjah	25.333333°N 56.35°E
10	Kalba	59,401	Sharjah	25.074167°N 56.355278°E
11	**Umm Al Quwain**	59,098	Umm al-Quwain	25.544095°N 55.553305°E
12	Ghayathi	58,700	Abu Dhabi	23.8425°N 52.81°E
13	Madinat Zayed	54,760	Abu Dhabi	23.652222°N 53.653611°E
14	Dibba Al-Fujairah	52,413	Fujairah	25.591°N 56.26°E
15	Al Dhannah	42,770	Abu Dhabi	24.103333°N 52.583611°E
16	Dhaid	39,295	Sharjah	25.283333°N 55.883333°E
17	Al Hamriyah	22,354	Sharjah	25.2851°N 55.2954°E
18	Liwa Oasis	20,192	Abu Dhabi	23.133333°N 53.766667°E
19	Al Madam	18,000	Sharjah	
20	Dibba Al Hisn	16,116	Sharjah	25.618889°N 56.273333°E
21	Hatta	13,023	Dubai	24.796667°N 56.1175°E
22	Rams	13,000	Ras Al Khaimah	25.878889°N 56.023611°E
23	Al Awir	12,259	Dubai	25.175°N 55.541667°E
24	Sila	10,580	Abu Dhabi	
25	Al Ghayl	10,337	Ras Al Khaimah	25.4000°N 56.0667°E
26	Masfut	10,215	Ajman	
27	Al Jazirah Al Hamra	10,190	Ras Al Khaimah	25.6832°N 55.8200°E

== Other towns and settlements ==
City	Population	Emirate
Abu al Abyad		Abu Dhabi
Adhen	5,196	Ras Al Khaimah
Al Ajban		Abu Dhabi
Al Aryam		Abu Dhabi
Al Badiyah	7,153	Fujairah
Al Bataeh	3,958	Sharjah
Al Bithnah		Fujairah
Al Faqa	2,291	Abu Dhabi and Dubai
Al Halah		Fujairah
Al Hamraniyah	2,066	Ras Al Khaimah
Al Jeer	5,111	Ras Al Khaimah
Al Khawaneej	8,222	Dubai
Al Lisaili	2,514	Dubai
Al Manama	5,823	Ajman
Al Mirfa	9,111	Abu Dhabi
Al Qusaidat		Ras Al Khaimah
Al Qor	1,313	Ras Al Khaimah
Al Salamah		Umm al-Quwain
Al Shuwaib		Abu Dhabi
Al Rafaah	2,704	Umm al-Quwain
Al Rashidya		Umm al-Quwain
Al Ruwayyah	6,984	Dubai
Al Yahar		Abu Dhabi
Asimah	1,673	Ras Al Khaimah
Dalma	5,000	Abu Dhabi
Dadna		Fujairah
Digdaga	6,131	Ras Al Khaimah
Falaj Al Mualla	4,253	Umm al-Quwain
Ghalilah	4,734	Ras Al Khaimah
Ghub		Fujairah
Habshan		Abu Dhabi
Huwaylat	1,005	Ras Al Khaimah
Khatt	3,095	Ras Al Khaimah
Khor Khwair	4,532	Ras Al Khaimah
Lahbab	4,490	Dubai
Manama	5,823	Ajman
Marawah		Abu Dhabi
Masafi	7,637	Ras Al Khaimah and Fujairah
Mirbah		Fujairah
Mleiha	4,768	Sharjah
Nahil		Abu Dhabi
Qidfa		Fujairah
Sha'am	3,014	Ras Al Khaimah
Sweihan	5,403	Abu Dhabi
Wadi Shah		Ras Al Khaimah
Zubarah	3,779	Sharjah
