= Al Hamra Village =

Coordinates: 25°41′32″N 55°47′04″E

Al Hamra Village قرية الحمرا
- Community
- Al Jazeera Al Hamra-Qaryat Al Hamra
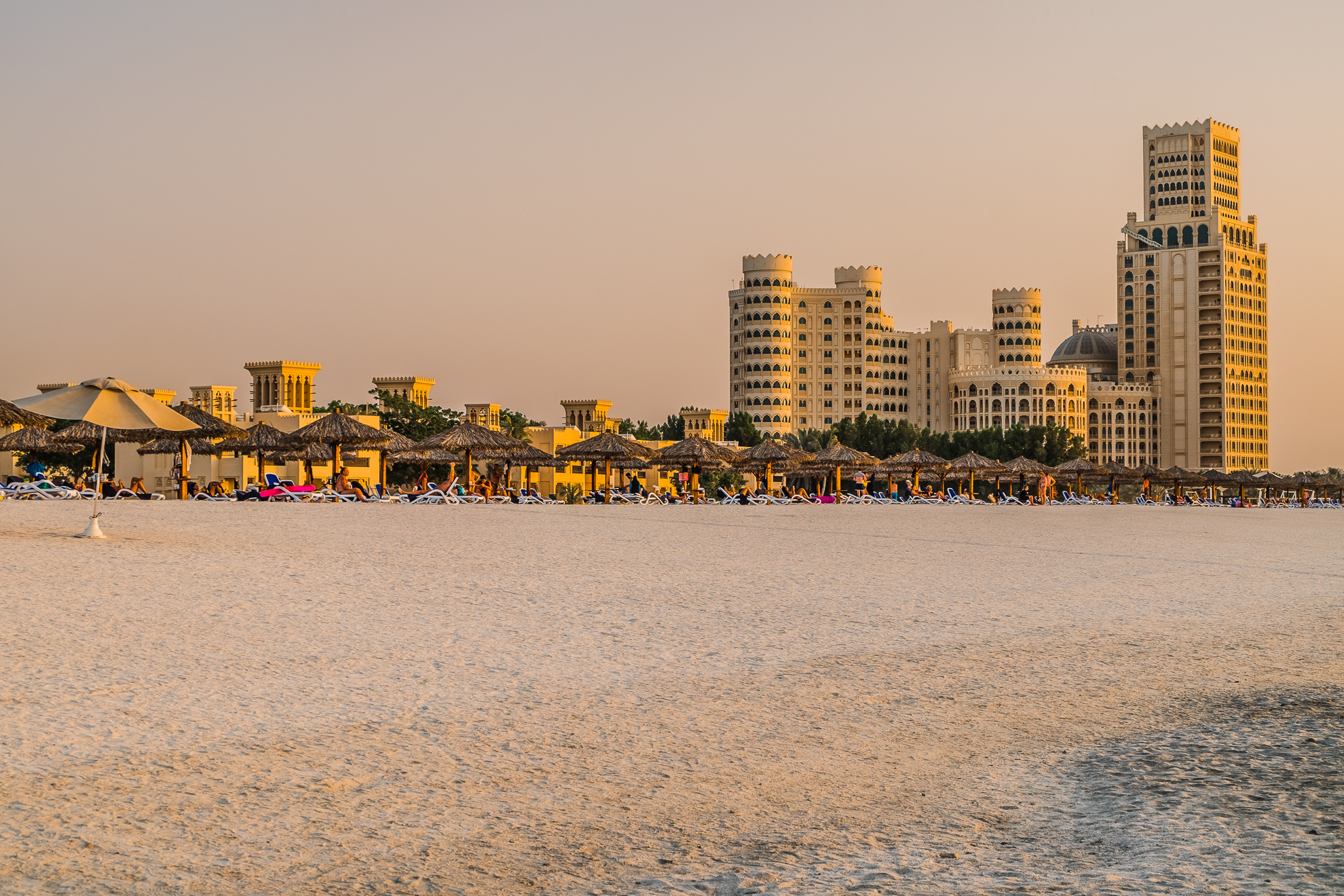
- View of the Waldorf Astoria from Al Hamra Village beach
- Interactive map of Al Hamra Village
- Country: United Arab Emirates
- Emirate: Emirate of Ras Al Khaimah
- City: Ras Al Khaimah
- Established: 2003

Population (2023)
  - Total: 5,787
- Website: https://alhamra.ae/

Al Hamra Village is a gated community in Al Jazirah Al Hamra in the Emirate of Ras Al Khaimah, United Arab Emirates. As of 2023, it has a population of 5787 of mostly non-citizens according to the RAK census. The community is situated on the Persian Gulf coast in the southern part of Ras Al Khaimah.

Launched by Al Hamra Real Estate Development in 2003, it spans roughly 7 km² along the Gulf coast, and includes around 4,000 homes, an 18‑hole championship golf course, a 200‑berth marina and yacht club, several five‑star hotels, including Waldorf Astoria, and a major retail mall.

== Development and History ==
Al Hamra Real Estate Development was established in 2003 and began developing Al Hamra Village in the early 2000s. Early reports referred to the project as a Dh1 billion development, with additional residential units being prepared for market release during its second phase.

Its master plan includes residential areas, hotel and resort properties, a marina, a retail mall, beach facilities and the Al Hamra Golf Club. Earlier published descriptions gave the project an area of 77 million square feet, approximately 1.5 kilometres of shoreline, more than 1,000 villas and townhouses, and nearly 2,500 apartments. They include Royal Breeze and Marina Residences, which are mainly apartment developments, while Bayti and Falcon Island contain lower-density villas and townhouses. More recent developer sources describes the community as containing approximately 4,500 homes, while other market and corporate sources commonly cite about 4,000 homes. Luxury hotel brands located in Al Hamra Village include Sofitel, Waldorf Astoria Hotels & Resorts, Hilton and The Ritz-Carlton.

In 2020, Al Hamra promoted a programme that paired purchases of ready homes with 12-year long-term UAE residency and a business license in an effort to attract foreign property investors.

== Infrastructure ==
Al Hamra Community Management administers shared facilities and resident services in Al Hamra Village and related Al Hamra developments. Its functions include maintenance, community communications, service coordination and management of common areas.

=== Education ===
Ras Al Khaimah Academy has a campus located within the community, oriented towards the International Baccalaureate curriculum.
