= Dubai Shopping Festival =

Promotional shopping event in Dubai

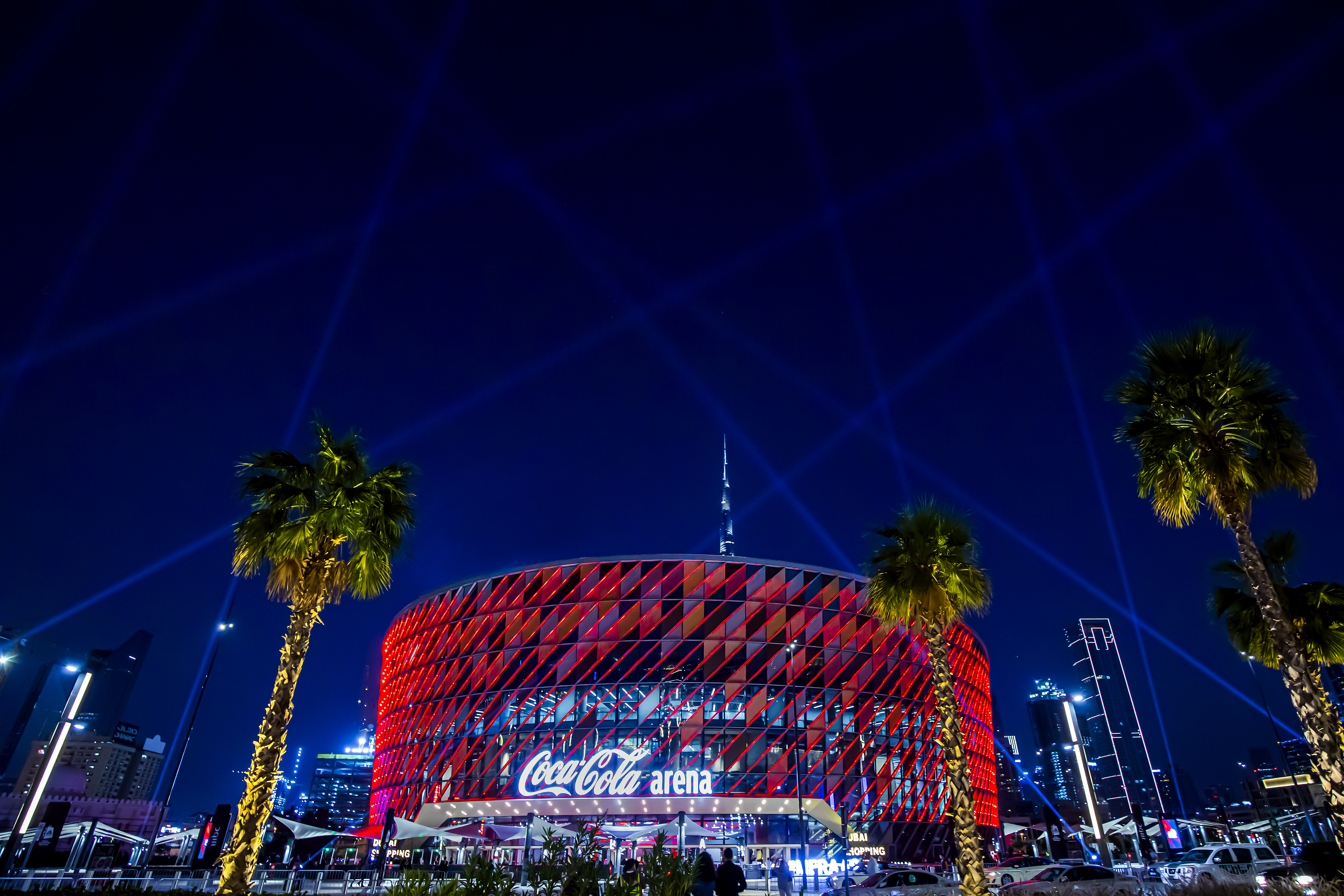
Coca-Cola Arena during the Dubai Shopping Festival Closing Celebrations

Dubai Shopping Festival (DSF; Arabic: مهرجان دبي للتسوق, romanized: Mahrajan Dubayy lil-tasawoq) is an annual month long event put together by the Dubai Festivals & Retail Establishment (DFRE), which is a part of Dubai's Department of Economy and Tourism. During the festival, shops offer discounts on their merchandise, daily car raffles and prize drawings are held to win items such as gold and cars, and there is a fireworks display. There are also a range of family activities and live shows that take place throughout Dubai.

== History ==
The Festival first began on 16 February 1996 and took a total of 45 days to construct before launching. The idea for the festival was first created by Sheikh Mohammed bin Rashid Al Maktoum. The year 2019 is its 24th year of operation. The 24th edition of the Dubai Shopping Festival from 2018 to 2019 will take place for over five weeks, which marks the longest period of time that the festival has run so far. "One World, One Family, One Festival" is the motto for the Dubai Shopping Festival.

== Economic growth ==
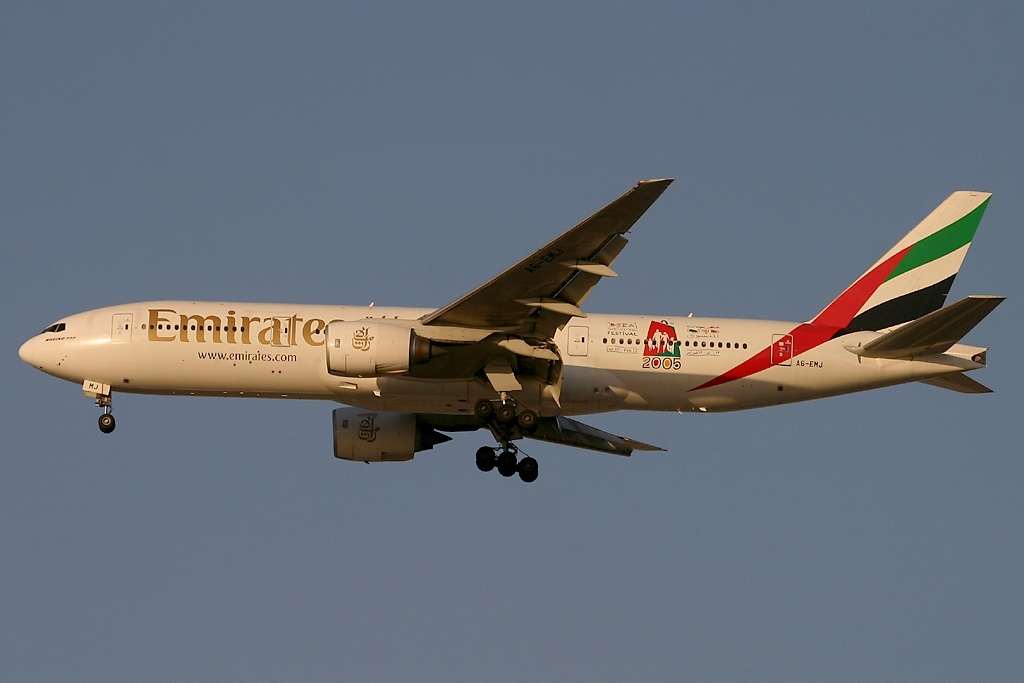
Emirates aircraft advertising the festival in 2005.

The festival was originally constructed to attract increases in the retail trade industry in Dubai, United Arab Emirates, but was later promoted as a tourist attraction. The first Dubai Shopping Festival in 1996 attracted more than one and a half million people who spent over of US$500 million during the one month event. These statistics have since grown, with more than three million people attending the festival and over 2 billion dollars being earned at the Dubai Shopping Festival in 2009. The Festival industry has been a big contributor in Dubai's economy, helping to stimulate tourism and the retail market. In the most recent festival from 2018 to 2019, over 700 brand names and 3000 stores will have participated.

== News ==
Multiple world records have been set in Dubai during the Dubai Shopping Festival. In 1999, the world's longest gold chain and sofa as well as the biggest chair, stationary bicycle, and mattress were shown at the festival. In 2001, the largest incense burner, shopping bag, and bowl of biriyani were displayed at the festival. In 2002, the largest entry visa in size was issued, along with the showcase of the largest magazine and box of chocolates. In 2004, the largest shopping cart and calendar, as well as the longest buffet were displayed. In 2006, the festival was postponed, and later cancelled due to the death of Dubai's ruler, Sheikh Maktoum bin Rashid Al Maktoum. In 2013, Dubai Metro held the first fashion show that took place on a moving train as a part of the DSF festivities. The Dubai Shopping Festival (DSF) 2023-2024 will be held from 15 December 2023 to 29 January 2024.

== The Activities ==
The festival has included many diverse activities over the years such as shop and win, lucky draws, and shopping parades. The festival also offers retail shopping options with great discounts on a wide range of products and prizes for the best spenders, in addition to global brands offering exclusive products and collections for the festival, accompanied by fashion shows by local and international designers. Live concerts and art shows are also held, with food festivals that include international cuisine. A children's area has been added with entertainment tours. The Dubai Shopping Festival has been distinguished by cultural events and exhibitions that showcase the heritage and traditions of the United Arab Emirates, and sessions are held to meet celebrities and influencers. The festival offers travel packages that facilitate visas and planning for travel to Dubai. The festival concludes with fireworks displays on the last day.

== See also ==
- UAE Awafi Festival
- Mall of the Emirates
- Global Village
- Jumeirah Beach
