= RAK Gateway =

The RAK Gateway is a planned community in Ras Al Khaimah, the United Arab Emirates. It is planned to be sustainable along the same lines as the proposed Masdar City in Abu Dhabi.
