= Kharran =

- Location within United Arab Emirates
- Coordinates: 25°42′47″N 55°58′9″E
- Country: United Arab Emirates
- Emirate: Ras Al Khaimah
- Elevation: 6 m (20 ft)

Kharran is a suburb of the city of Ras Al Khaimah in the United Arab Emirates (UAE). It is the location of the Saqr Public Park, the oldest and largest family entertainment park in the emirate. The park encompasses an area of 280 dunums and facilities include restaurants, boating lakes and train rides for children.
