= Zubarah, Sharjah =

Zubarah
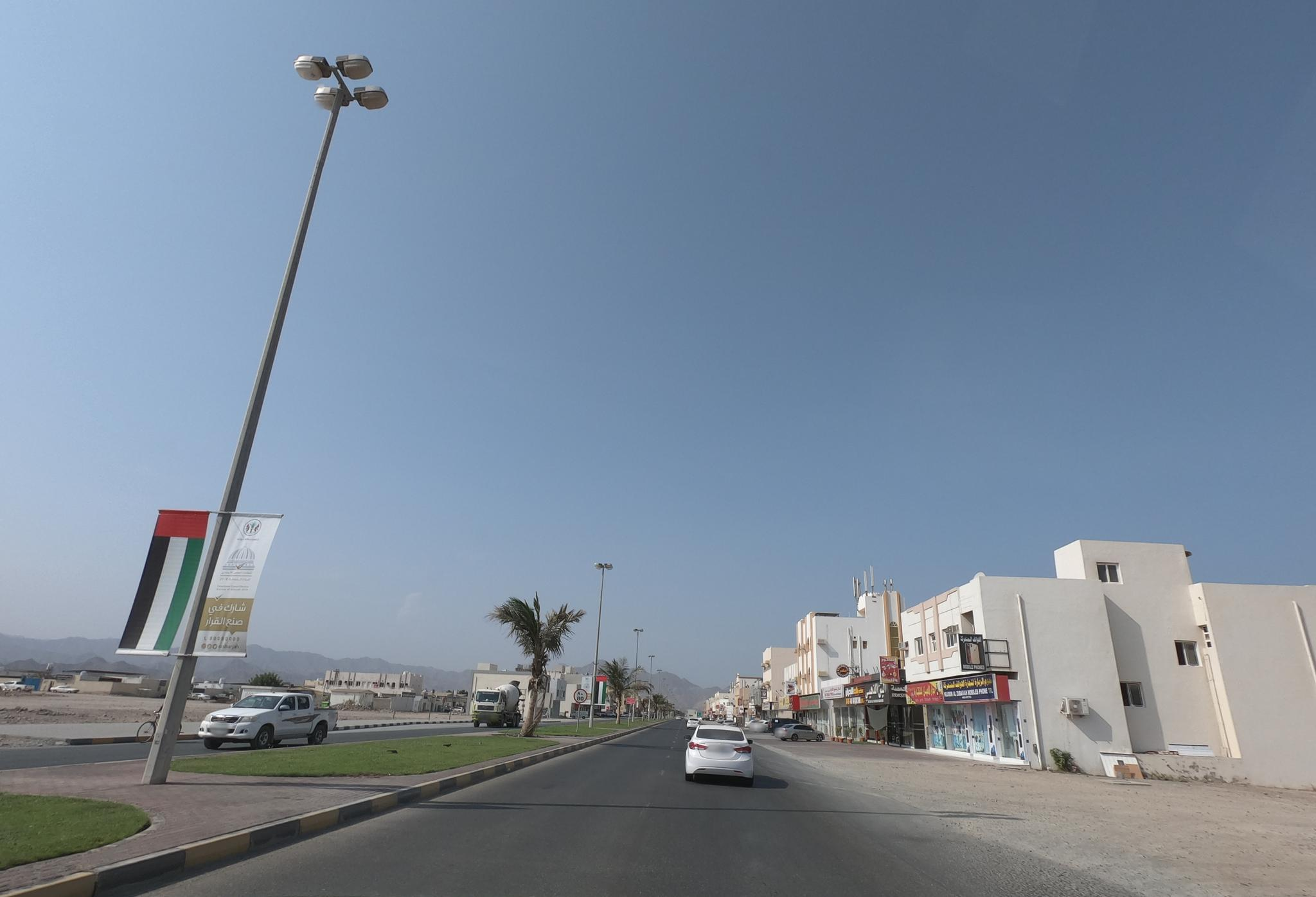
- Storefront on Omar Bin Al Khattab in the town of Zubarah.

- Location within United Arab Emirates
- Coordinates: 25°24′9″N 56°21′41″E
- Country: United Arab Emirates
- Emirate: Sharjah

Area
  - Total: 3.17 km^{2} (1.22 sq mi)

Population (2015)
  - Total: 3,779

Zubarah is a coastal suburb to the North of Khor Fakkan, Sharjah, in the United Arab Emirates (UAE). It is the northernmost district of Khor Fakkan municipality.
