= Wadi Shah, Ras Al Khaimah =

Wadi Shah وادي شحة
- Location within United Arab Emirates
- Coordinates: 25°55′03″N 56°08′26″E
- Country: United Arab Emirates
- Emirate: Ras al-Khaimah
- Elevation: 714 m (2,343 ft)

Wadi Shah (Arabic: وادي شحة, also known as Wadi Shehah) is a wadi, or waterway, in the mountains of Ras Al Khaimah, United Arab Emirates (UAE). A popular hiking location near Jebel Jais, the highest point in the UAE, Wadi Shah is also the location of the abandoned former settlement of Shah.
