= Bu Shaqq tower =

Bu Shaqq tower is a mudbrick watch tower in Ras Al Khaimah, United Arab Emirates (UAE).
