= RAK Airways =

Airline based in Ras Al Khaimah, UAE

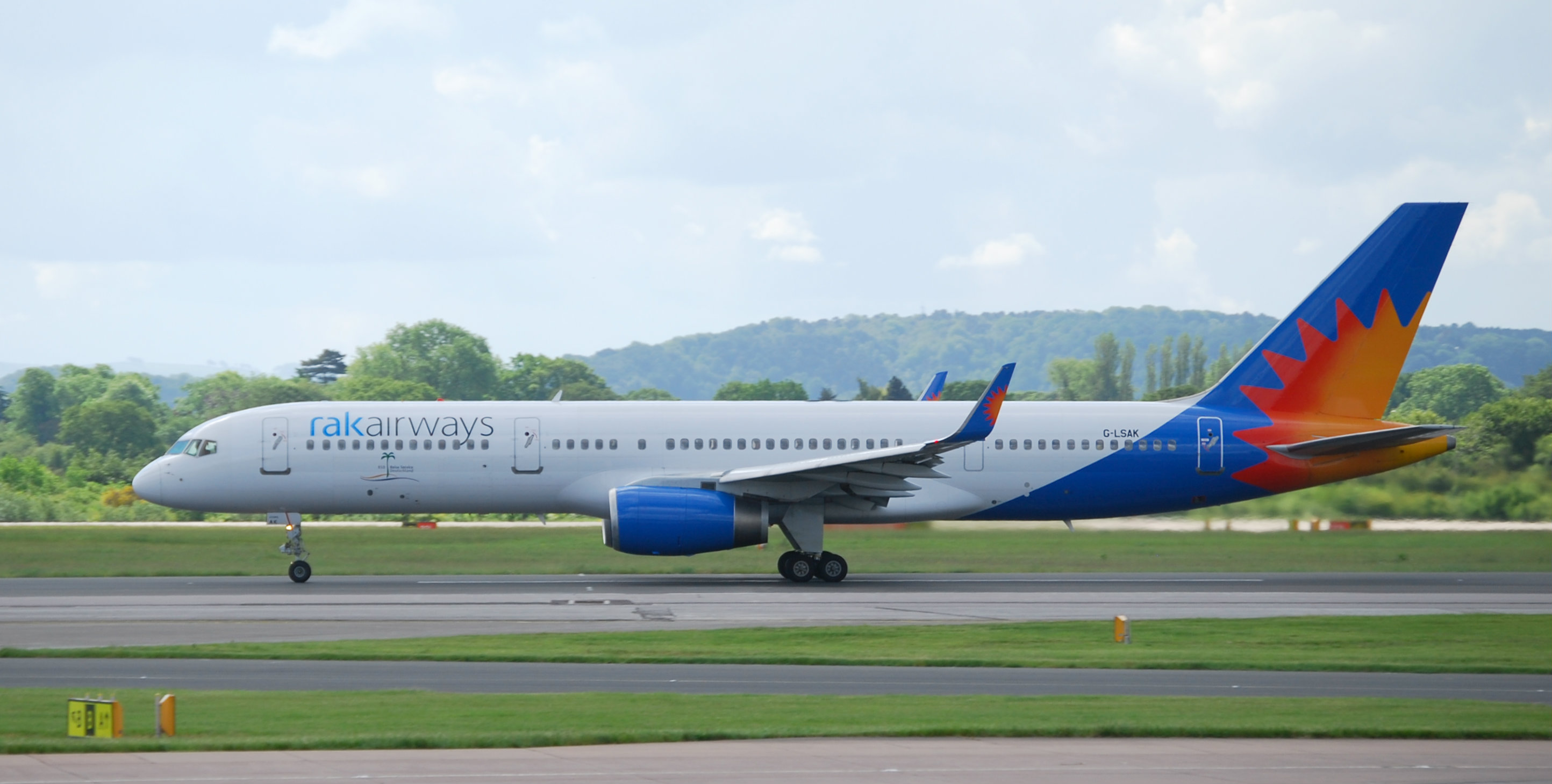
- RAK Airways B757-200 in 2012
IATA	ICAO	Call sign
RT	RKM	RAKAIR
- Founded: 2006
- Ceased operations: 1 January 2014
- Operating bases: Ras Al Khaimah International Airport
- Fleet size: 2
- Destinations: 11
- Headquarters: Ras al-Khaimah, United Arab Emirates
- Key people: Sheikh Saud bin Saqr al Qasimi (Chairman)

RAK Airways (Arabic: طيران رأس الخيمة) was an airline based in Ras Al Khaimah, United Arab Emirates. It was established in 2006 but briefly suspended operations in 2009 and relaunched in 2010 with a new livery and under new management. On 1 January 2014, the airline ceased operations.

== History ==
First news about a new airline based in Ras Al Khaimah emerged in 2005 and it was initially called Al Hamra Airlines. UAE Cabinet has later issued its official approval for setting up the RAK Airways as a national carrier in its decision No. 328/4 for 2005. The new airways launched operations in early 2007. The carrier was affected by the 2008 financial crisis and ceased operations in 2009.

In 2010 the airline announced that it would be resuming operations with a New "value-for-money" business model, aiming to position itself between full-service and low-cost carriers.

In February 2011, it was revealed that RAK Airways was planning on launching flights to between five and nine new destinations. Though it acknowledged the difficulty of securing slots at several of the destinations due to rival carriers in the UAE, it announced that it was finalizing a codeshare agreement with an Asian carrier and that it would also be increasing the size of its fleet.

In 2013, RAK Airways launched flights to Islamabad, Pakistan; and Amman, Jordan.

RAK Airways announced the immediate suspension of all operations on 1 January 2014, citing economic considerations.

== Destinations ==
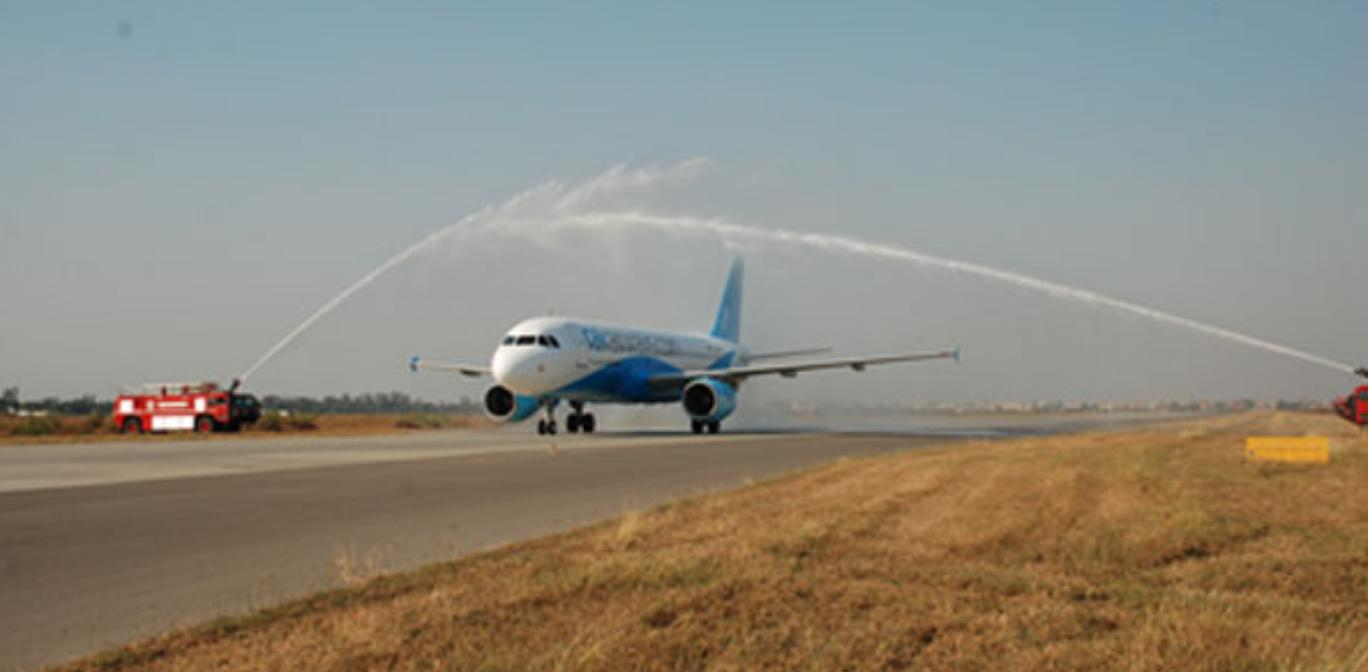
RAK Airways Airbus A320-200 in 2012

In December 2013, RAK Airways served the following destinations:

Country	City	Airport	Notes	Reference
Bangladesh	Dhaka	Shahjalal International Airport		
India	Kozhikode	Calicut International Airport		
Nepal	Kathmandu	Tribhuvan International Airport		
Pakistan	Islamabad, Lahore, Peshawar	Benazir Bhutto International Airport, Allama Iqbal International Airport, Bacha Khan International Airport		
Qatar	Doha	Doha International Airport		
Saudi Arabia	Jeddah, Riyadh	King Abdulaziz International Airport, Jeddah, King Khalid International Airport, Riyadh		
United Arab Emirates	Ras al-Khaimah	Ras Al Khaimah International Airport	Hub	

=== Bus operations ===
RAK Airways also operated bus services from Ras Al Khaimah to other UAE destinations like Abu Dhabi, Dubai, Al Ain, Ajman, Fujairah, Sharjah, Umm Al Quwain, and Khor Fakkan.

== Fleet ==
As of August 2013, the RAK Airways fleet consisted of the following aircraft and had pending orders for Boeing 737 Next Generation:

RAK Airways Fleet
Aircraft	In Fleet	Notes
Airbus A320-200	2	
Total	2	
