= UAE Awafi Festival =

Coordinates: 25°42′49.58″N 55°56′51.59″E

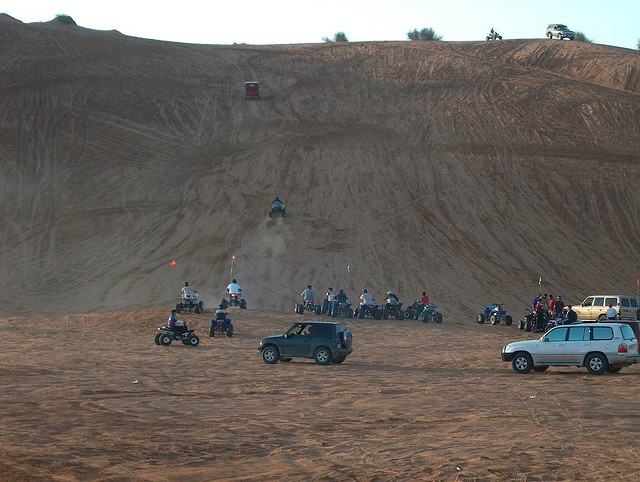
Sand dune adventure in Awafi

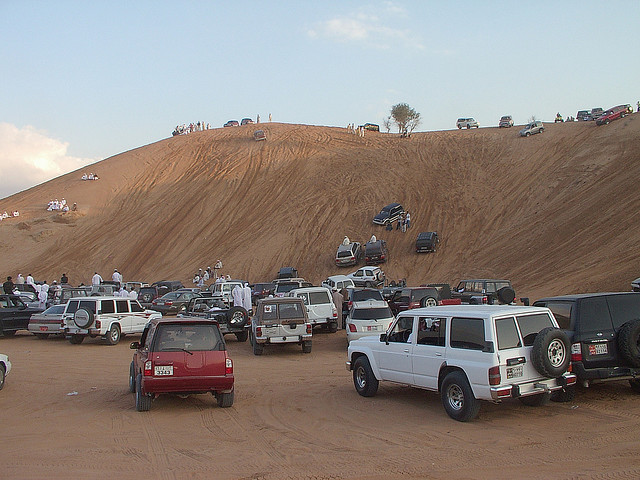
Sand duning in Awafi

The UAE Awafi Festival is an annual festival in the United Arab Emirates. It is held in the spring. It celebrates the Emirates' ethnic and cultural heritage through outdoor sporting events, theater performances and cultural displays. The festival includes competitions in which participants scale sand dunes in various vehicles. The event is held in the Awafi area (known for its red sand dunes) in Ras al-Khaimah, United Arab Emirates (UAE).

The festival is open to the public. Attendees usually arrive in off-road vehicles.

The festival includes a Heritage Village show, local arts and crafts exhibitions, a bazaar, children's play area, clinics and a police aid. Food outlets, internet cafés and coffee shops are available. The car and dune bike racing competitions are held in December or January.

== Location ==
The festival is celebrated in the Ras al-Khaimah desert. This desert is home to many towering sand dunes and harbors rough terrain. The area covers 500 acres.

== See also ==
- Dubai Shopping Festival
- Dubai Marathon
- Dubai Desert Classic
- Dubai International Jazz Festival
