= Al Rafaah =

Umm Al Thuoob
- Location within United Arab Emirates
- Coordinates: 25°36′55″N 55°42′10″E
- Country: United Arab Emirates
- Emirate: Umm Al Quwain
- Elevation: 14 m (46 ft)

Population (2015)
  - Total: 2,704
- Time zone: UTC+4

Al Rafaah is a settlement in Umm Al Quwain, United Arab Emirates (UAE). It is a popular beach for camping and leisure activities.
