= Al Hamraniyah =

- Location within United Arab Emirates
- Coordinates: 25°36′41″N 55°54′1″E
- Country: United Arab Emirates
- Emirate: Ras Al Khaimah
- Elevation: 54 m (177 ft)

Al Hamraniyah (Arabic: الحمرانية) is a settlement and agricultural area in Ras Al Khaimah, United Arab Emirates, immediately to the West of Ras Al Khaimah International Airport.

Hamraniyah is a popular area for birdwatching, and the only place in the UAE where European Bee-eater, European Roller, Common Starling and Spanish Sparrows have been found breeding. It is visited by a wide variety of migratory bird species. It is also an archaeological site, with digs taking place after further exploration of the area was called for by Ras Al Khaimah Ruler Sheikh Saud bin Saqr Al Qasimi.
