= Ras Al Khaimah International Airport =

Airport in Ras Al Khaimah, United Arab Emirates

Ras Al Khaimah International Airport (Ra's al-Khaymah)

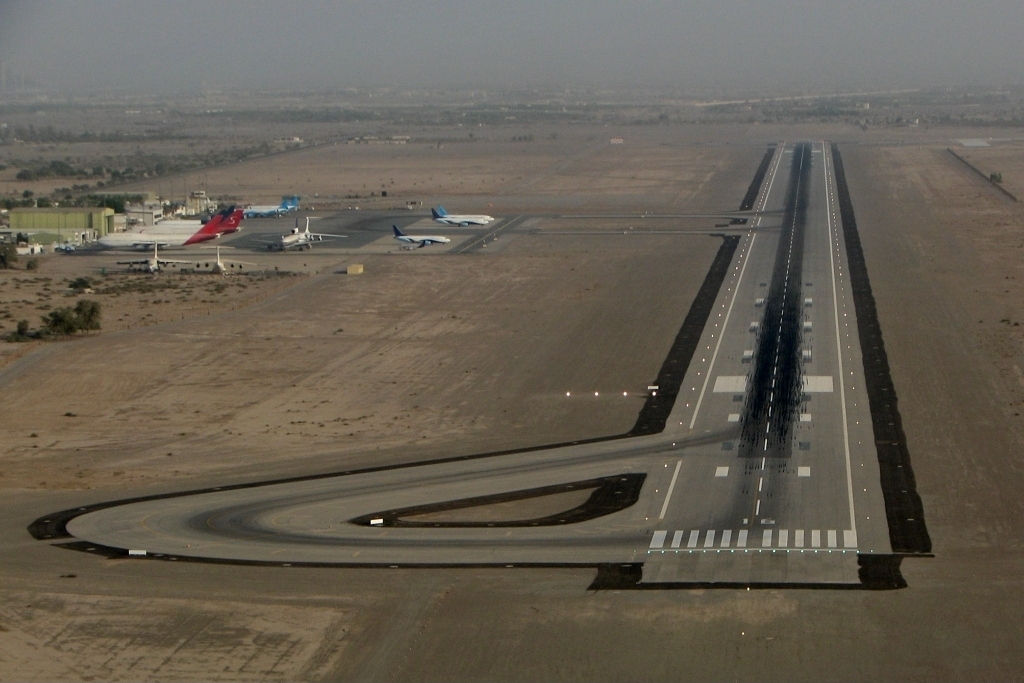
- IATA: RKT; ICAO: OMRK

Summary
- Airport type: Public
- Operator: Department of Civil Aviation
- Location: Ras al-Khaimah
- Operating base for: Air Arabia
- Time zone: UAE Standard Time (UTC+04:00)
- Elevation AMSL: 94 ft (29 m)
- Coordinates: 25°36′48″N 055°56′20″E
- Website: www.rakairport.com

Map
- Location in the UAE

Runways
Direction	Length		Surface
Direction	m	ft	Surface
16/34	3,760	12,336	Asphalt
- Sources: UAE AIP

Ras Al Khaimah International Airport (IATA: RKT, ICAO: OMRK) (Arabic: مطار رأس الخيمة الدولي) is an international airport located in Ras Al Khaimah, United Arab Emirates. The airport has two passenger terminal buildings as well as cargo, aircraft maintenance, and aviation training facilities.

== History ==
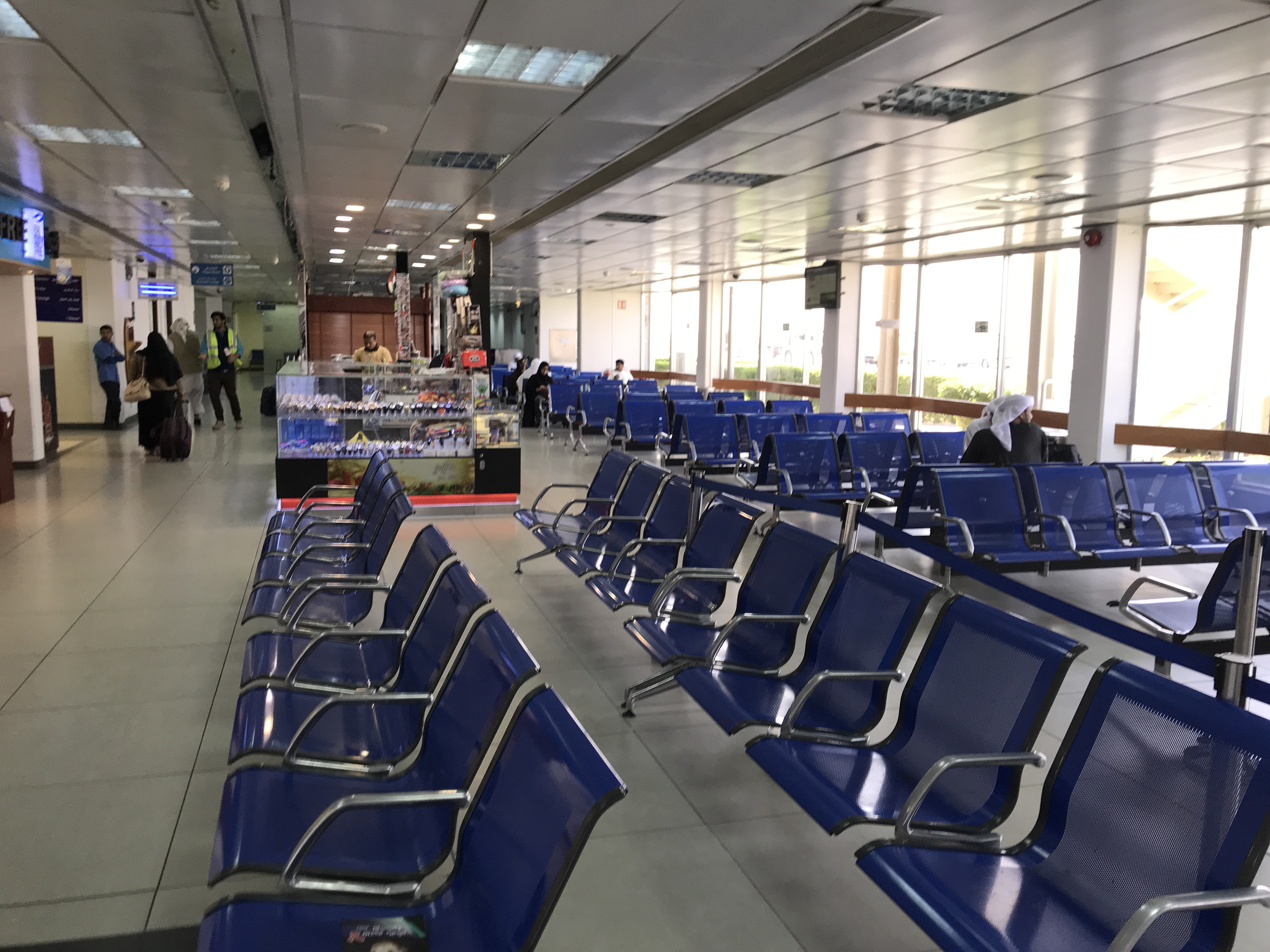
Terminal interior

In 1976, the airport was inaugurated by RAK ruler, Sheikh Saqr bin Mohammad Al Qasimi. In 2007, RAK Airways started operating as the national airline with a hub at the airport. It suspended regular operations in 2008 due to the global economic crisis. It relaunched in 2010 with new branding and management, but suspended operations permanently in 2013.

In 2014, Air Arabia started its commercial flights to different destinations including Pakistan, Egypt, Saudi Arabia and Bangladesh following the suspension of RAK Airways. Ras Al Khaimah was designated as a hub for Air Arabia for a period of ten years, extendable thereafter.

Growing at 25% year-on-year in 2013 (albeit from a low base), the airport was refocused with efforts to attract cargo business, in particular from establishments under the Ras Al Khaimah Free Trade Zone.

== Airlines and destinations ==
The following airlines operate regular scheduled and charter flights at Ras Al Khaimah Airport:

=== Passenger ===
Airlines	Destinations
Air Arabia	Cairo, Jeddah, Kazan (suspended until 27 March 2027), Kozhikode, Moscow–Domodedovo (suspended until 27 March 2027), Tashkent, Yekaterinburg (suspended until 27 March 2027)
Air India Express	Kannur, Kozhikode, Lucknow, Mangaluru
IndiGo	Hyderabad, Kochi

=== Cargo ===
Airlines	Destinations
IndiGo Cargo	Mumbai

== Accidents and incidents ==
- In July 1998, a Ukrainian Ilyushin Il-76 cargo plane (registration UR-76424) took off whilst heavily overloaded. After slowly climbing to 180 metres (590 ft) the pilot received a GPWS warning, but then responded by descending the aircraft into the sea (CFIT), four minutes after take-off, and approximately 4.5 kilometres (2.8 miles) offshore. All 8 crew members on board died.

== In popular culture ==
In 2015, Ras Al Khaimah Airport served as the set for the filming of the Hindi film Airlift starring Akshay Kumar.

== See also ==
- Transport in UAE
- List of the busiest airports in the Middle East
