= Huwaylat =

Huwaylat الحويلات
- Location within United Arab Emirates
- Coordinates: 24°52′38″N 56°10′24″E
- Country: United Arab Emirates
- Emirate: Ras Al Khaimah

Area
  - Total: 34.72 km^{2} (13.41 sq mi)
- Elevation: 374 m (1,227 ft)

Population (2017-07-01)
  - Total: 789

Huwaylat (Arabic: الحويلات) is a settlement in Ras Al Khaimah, United Arab Emirates (UAE). A small village in the Wadi Qor, it is the site of three Umm Al Nar period tombs.
