= Khor Khwair =

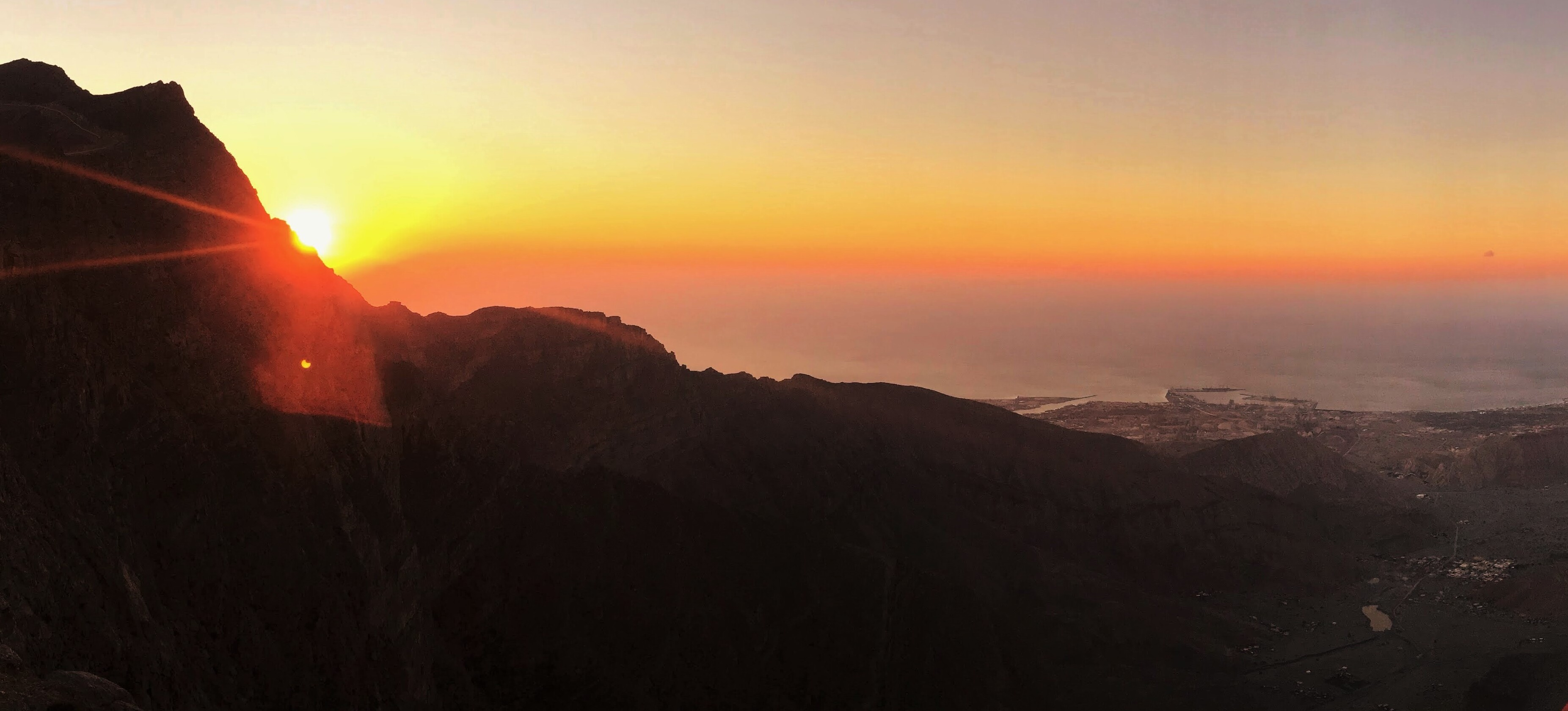

- Location within United Arab Emirates
- Coordinates: 25°58′2″N 56°3′16″E
- Country: United Arab Emirates
- Emirate: Ras Al Khaimah
- Elevation: 17 m (56 ft)

Khor Khwair is an industrial zone located next to Saqr Port in the city of Ras Al Khaimah, United Arab Emirates (UAE). Located some 25km north of the city, the zone contains marble and concrete manufacturing facilities as well as LPG processing and other industrial enterprises. Saqr Port was inaugurated on 17 September 1977 by the then-Ruler of Ras Al Khaimah, Sheikh Saqr bin Mohammed Al Qasimi - the day after, he attended a ceremony to mark the export of the first five million tons of rock from Ras Al Khaimah.

== Quarry ==
The quarry at Khor Khwair has caused local controversy because of adverse health effects reported by residents of the former small community located there. With a production capacity of 7,000 tonnes of stone per hour and reserves of four billion tonnes, it is one of the world's largest such facilities. Quarrying operations in the area are monitored by the Ministry of Environment and Water (MoEW): however, the government of Ras Al Khaimah is a shareholder in Stevin Rock, one of the largest quarries in the area.

A number of cement companies and rock processors are based at Khor Khwair, including two of the UAE's largest quarries and four cement plants. Notable cement plants include Gulf Cement Company, RAK Cement and the Union Cement Company.

== Gas ==
Khor Khwair is also home to RAK Gas, which operates a processing plant in the zone, comprising two gas treatment trains. These treat raw gas sourced from the Bukha and West Bukha fields located in Oman, as well as gas from the Umm al Quwain field, the Dolphin project and Ras Al Khaimah's own Saleh field, which is, however, nearing the end of its economic life.

Two condensate storage tanks, each of 250,000 barrels capacity, are located near the processing plant. These store gas condensate before loading onto ocean going LPG tankers, with a loading system capacity of 10,000 barrels per hour. Six 50-ton LPG storage tanks and a fleet of LPG trucks and trailers are used to deliver LPG to domestic customers.
