= Al Jazirah Al Hamra =

Al Jazirah Al Hamra الجزيرة الحمراء
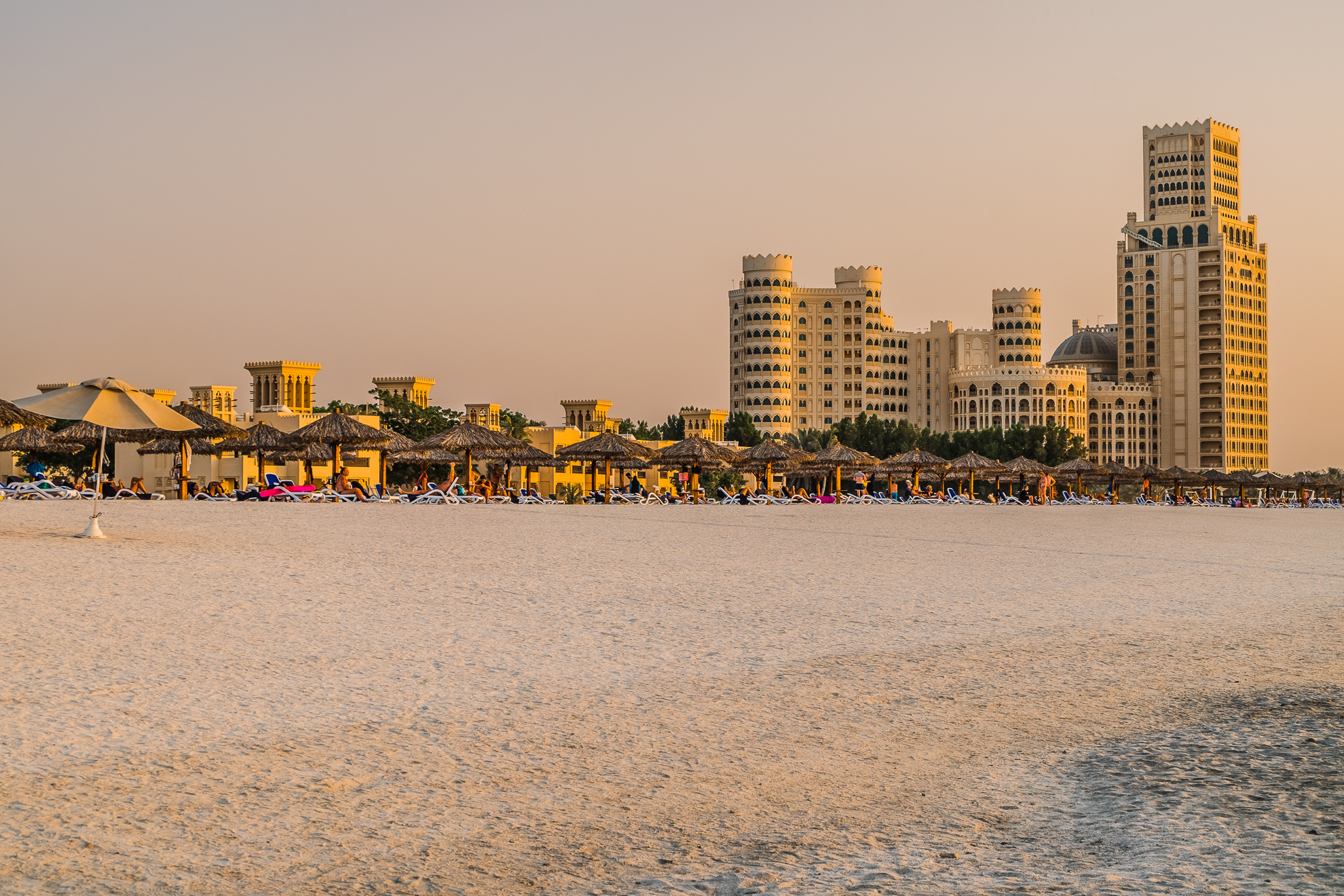
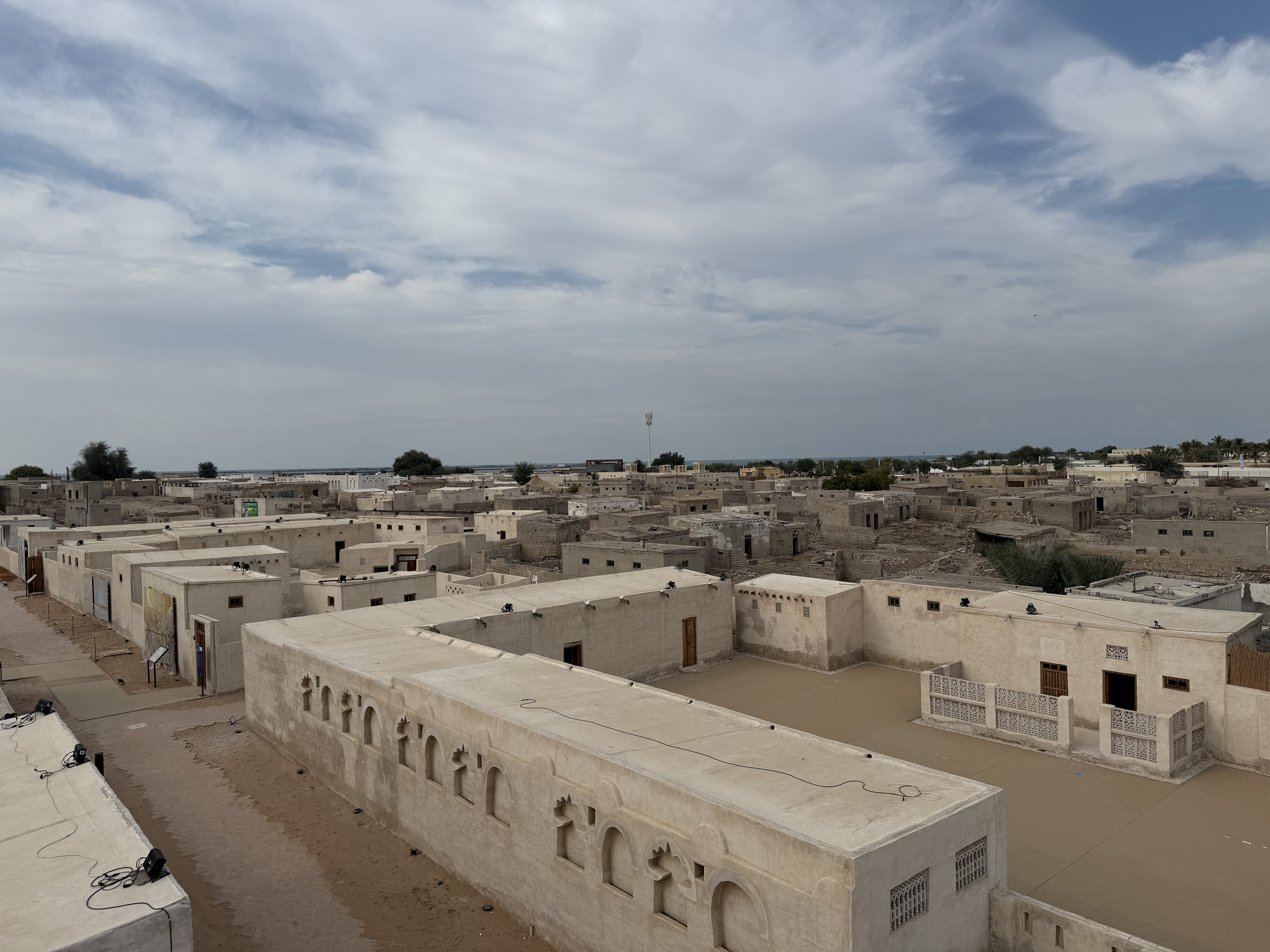
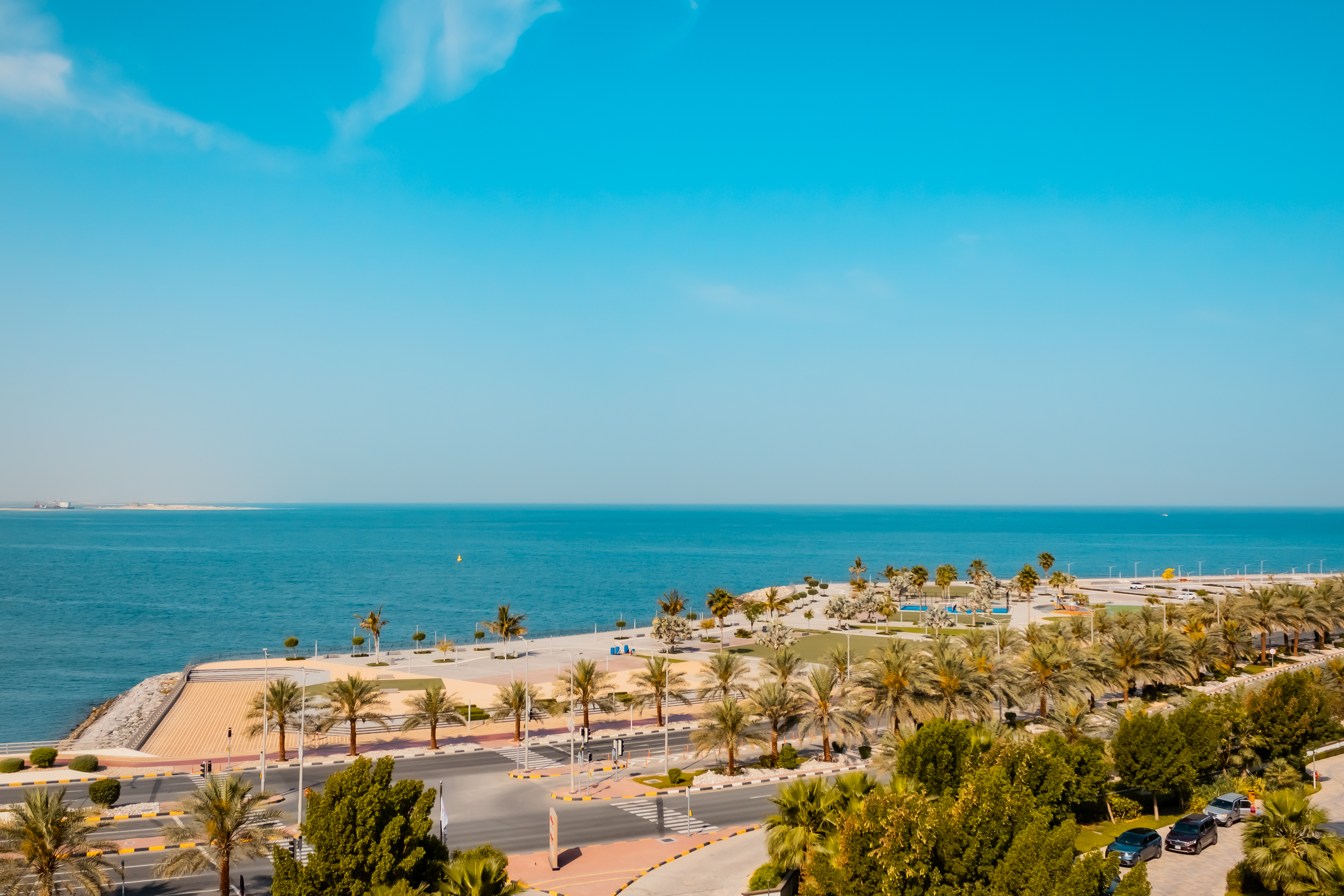
- View of Al Hamra Village and the Waldorf Astoria View of Al Hamra Village homes Al Jazeerah Al Hamra Heritage Village Sea View from Al Marjan Island

- Location within United Arab Emirates
- Coordinates: 25°42′32″N 55°47′50″E
- Country: United Arab Emirates
- Emirate: Ras Al Khaimah
- Elevation: 8 m (26 ft)

Population (2023)
  - City: 7,162
  - Urban: 60,191
- Time zone: UTC+4

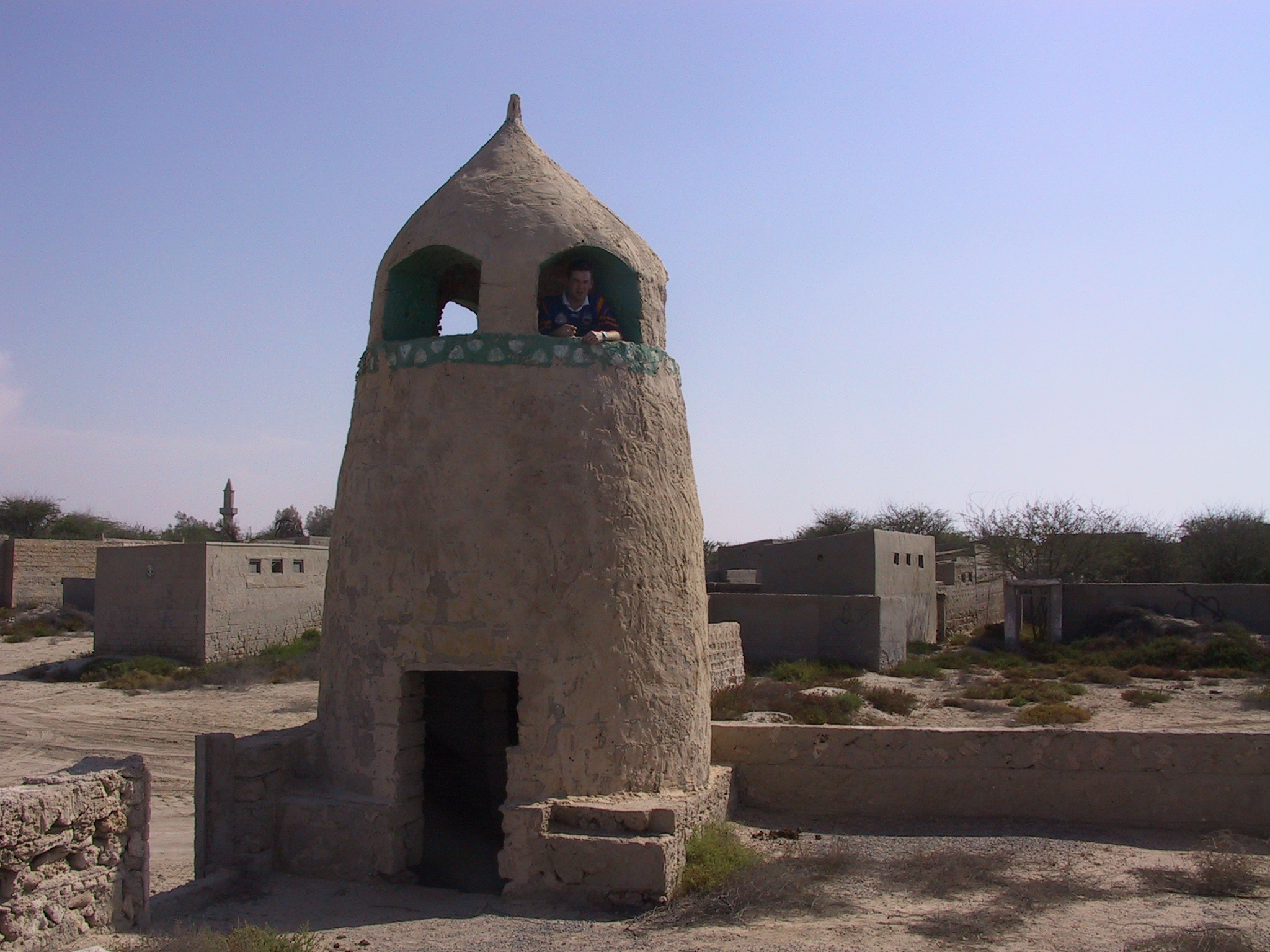
The old mosque in the abandoned part of Al Jazirah Al Hamra

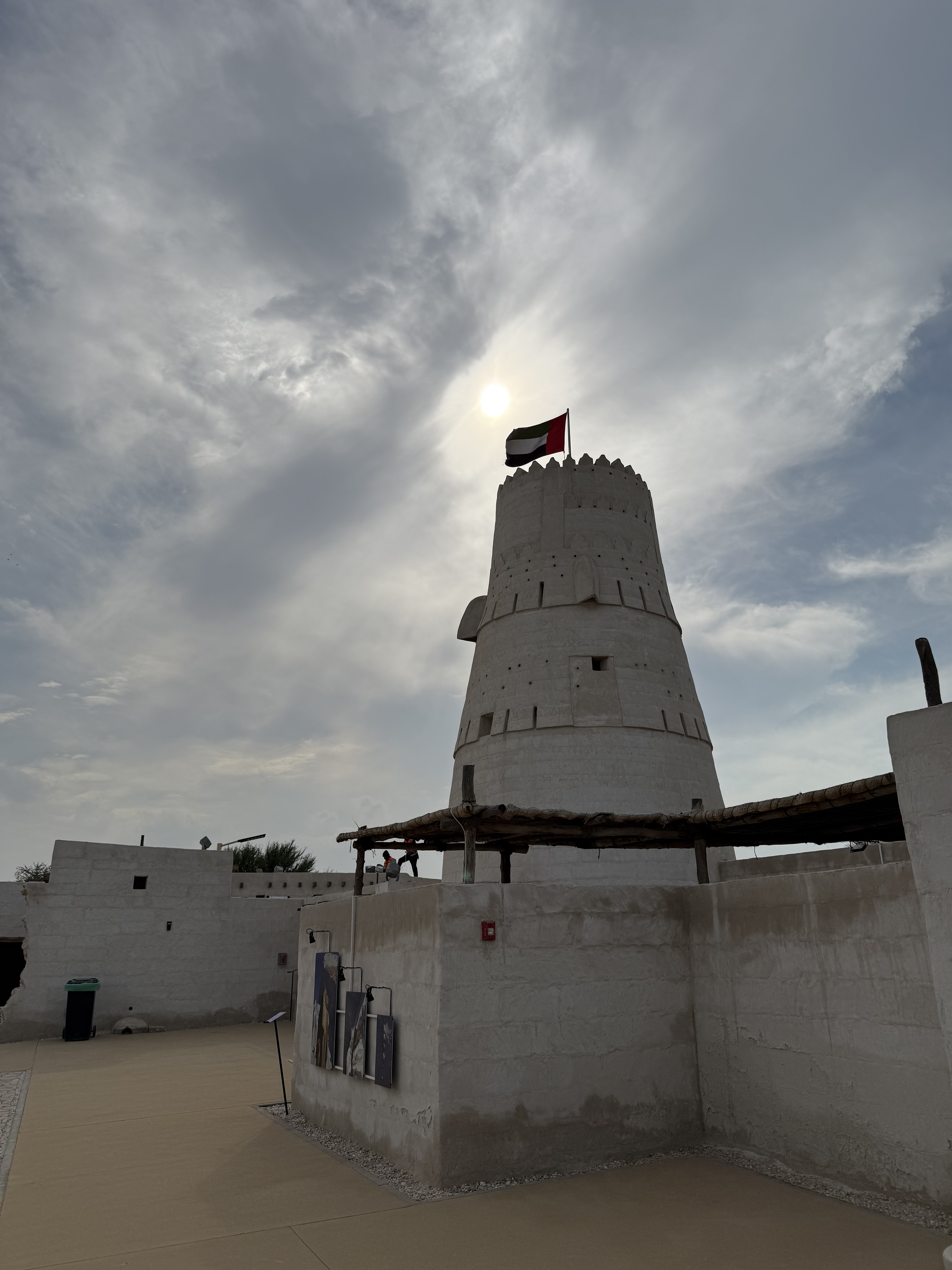
Al Jazirah Al Hamra Fort, January 2026

Al Jazirah Al Hamra or Jazirat Al Hamra (Arabic: الجزيرة الحمراء, lit. 'the red island') is a town to the south of the city of Ras Al Khaimah in the United Arab Emirates. It is home to an abandoned village and has since been conserved and partially restored as a heritage attraction, while the wider Al Jazirah Al Hamra district has become home to several major modern developments, including Al Hamra Village, Al Marjan Island, Mina Al Arab and RAKEZ industrial zones.

The town was ruled by the Zaab tribe, which was rehoused in Abu Dhabi following a dispute with the ruler of Ras Al Khaimah. It is the only remaining intact pre‑oil pearling and seafaring settlement of its kind in the Gulf, and has been recognised on UNESCO’s tentative list of World Heritage Sites as “the pearl trading town of Jazirat Al‑Hamra”.

== Etymology ==
The name Al Jazirah Al Hamra means “the Red Island” in Arabic, referring to the reddish colour of the sands and soils of the original tidal island on which the settlement was built. In historical sources the place is also referred to as Jazirat Al‑Hamra and, in some contexts, Jazeerat Al Za’ab, reflecting the long association of the settlement with the Za’ab (Al Zaabi) tribe.

== History ==
The settlement of Al Jazirah Al Hamra was established in the late 16th century by the Za’ab (Al Zaabi) tribe under Al Qasimi ruling. The site was attractive because of its position between desert, mountains and coastline, its access to marine resources, and the defensive advantages of a tidal island surrounded by shallow lagoons and marshland. The town was originally a tidal island and, by 1830, was home to some 200 people mostly occupied in pearl fishing. At the time, it was a dependency of Sharjah.

The Sheikh of Jazirah Al Hamra in 1820, Rajib bin Ahmed Al Zaabi, was one of four independent signatories to the original 1820 treaty between the Trucial States and the British, following the 1819 punitive expedition mounted against Ras Al Khaimah by the British. In the treaty, the sheikhdom was named as 'Jourat Al Kamra'.

The town has also been called Jazirah Al Zaab, as it was predominantly settled by members of the Zaab tribe (some 500 houses at the turn of the 20th century). A tidal island, it was split into two sections, the small northern quarter of Umm Awaimir and the southern Manakh. Although the Zaab had some 500 sheep and 150 cattle at the time, there were no palm groves, although the tribe tended groves at Kalba and Fujairah which produced income. Jazirah Al Hamrah maintained a fleet of some 25 pearling boats, the principal source of income for the tribe until the crash of the pearl market in the late 1920s.

Following an agreement between Sheikh Khalid bin Ahmad Al Qasimi of Sharjah and Sheikh Sultan bin Salim Al Qasimi of Ras Al Khaimah in 1914, the town became part of Ras Al Khaimah, but was often in dispute with the ruler. This led, in 1968, to a dispute with Sheikh Saqr bin Mohammed Al Qasimi of Ras Al Khaimah which resulted in the majority of the tribe accepting an offer from Sheikh Zayed bin Sultan Al Nahyan to move to Abu Dhabi. This movement left behind an almost completely abandoned village which had housed some 2,500 people.

=== Modern Era ===
As Ras Al Khaimah grew and attracted expatriates and investment, the surroundings of the now-heritage site started to develop into a modern residential area bringing life back to the town. By the mid-2000s, Al Jazeera al Hamra began to grow into a modern area with villas, apartments and townhouses. New urban and commercial areas have been constructed surrounding the old town which includes, Marjan Island, Mina al Arab, Al Hamra Village, and RAKEZ zones.

Al Hamra Real Estate Development was established in 2003 and began developing Al Hamra Village in the early 2000s. Early reports referred to the project as a Dh1 billion development, with additional residential units being prepared for market release during its second phase. The village is frequently described as Ras Al Khaimah’s first major freehold development

== Urban and Commercial Development ==
=== Al Hamra Village ===
Launched by Al Hamra Real Estate Development in 2003, Al Hamra Village spans roughly 7 km² along the Gulf coast, and includes around 4,000 homes, an 18‑hole championship golf course, a 200‑berth marina and yacht club, several five‑star hotels, including Waldorf Astoria, and a major retail mall. As of 2023, it has a population of 5787 of mostly non-citizens according to the RAK census.

=== Al Marjan Island ===
Al Marjan Island is a group of 4 coral-shaped islands in a man-made archipelago. Several resorts, beaches, tourism destinations and residential projects are located in the four islands, being one of the United Arab Emirates's top tourism destinations. Wynn Al Marjan Island will be an integrated resort developed by Wynn Resorts which will open in 2027. It will feature the first casino in the UAE.

=== Mina Al Arab ===
Mina Al Arab is a large waterfront master plan developed by RAK Properties along the coast south of Al Jazirah Al Hamra. The project covers several million square metres and is organised around districts such as Raha Island, Hayat Island and Lagoons, combining residential communities, hotels, marinas, retail and leisure amenities with natural features such as beaches and mangroves.

=== Al Jazeerah Al Hamra Industrial ===
The Ras Al Khaimah Economic Zone (RAKEZ) is the emirate’s principal free zone and industrial hub, operating several dedicated zones across Ras Al Khaimah. Within the Al Jazirah Al Hamra district, the most prominent is the Al Hamra Industrial Zone, described as a modern industrial estate supporting light and heavy industry, manufacturing, logistics and related activities.

RAKEZ also operates an Al Hamra Business Zone and other facilities in the area, offering offices, warehouses and land plots, along with business licensing and support services. The industrial zone is physically close to the historic town and Al Hamra Village, and is connected to ports, airports and major highways, making it a key employment and logistics node for the northern Emirates.

== Zaab ==
The last Al Zaab Sharif (mayor) of Jazirah Al Hamra was Hussein Bin Rahma Al Zaabi, who was later the Sharif of Al Zaab area in Abu Dhabi. His eldest son Rahma was the United Arab Emirates ambassador to many Arab countries.

== Culture ==
=== Art ===
The Ras Al Khaimah Art Festival has been held annually in the historic village since the early 2010s. Organised by the Sheikh Saud bin Saqr Al Qasimi Foundation for Policy Research, the festival uses the restored fort, mosques, courtyard houses and souq as exhibition spaces for contemporary art, installations, photography, film screenings and performances. By 2024 it had rebranded as Ras Al Khaimah Art, with over 130 artists from 36 countries displaying work across the historic town. The 2026 edition, themed “Civilizations – A Journey Through Time and Culture”, ran from 16 January to 8 February and brought together 106 artists from 42 countries, transforming the village into an open‑air gallery and adding curated dining experiences and workshops.

=== Media and Film ===
Portions of 6 Underground for Netflix were shot in Al Hamra in 2018. Director Michael Bay said about the place: "We shot in Al Hamra – an ancient ghost city they called it – that we played for Afghanistan. And literally right around the corner we played another part for Nigeria... It’s very versatile to have a place where literally like five minutes away it’s like a different country". The town is also the setting for the 2024 novel The Red Island by Adil Alzarooni.

=== Sports ===
The area is home to Al Jazirah Al Hamra Club, a professional football club founded in 1968 and based in Al Jazirah Al Hamra. The club competes in the UAE First Division League, the second tier of UAE football, and plays its home matches at Al Hamra Stadium, a ground with a capacity of around 2,000.

In 2022, Al Hamra Golf Club became a DP World Tour venue, hosting the inaugural Ras Al Khaimah Championship and the Ras Al Khaimah Classic in back‑to‑back events, and has continued to host the Championship in subsequent years. These tournaments attract international professional golfers and significant visitor numbers.

Motorsport is represented by RAK Track, a purpose‑built outdoor karting circuit on E11 Sheikh Mohammed bin Salem Road. RAK Track organises and hosts national and regional series including the IAME Series UAE, the X30 Challenge UAE and Sodi World Series sprint and endurance events, and is floodlit for evening racing.
