= Trucial States =

1820–1971 British protectorate in Arabia

Trucial States الإمارات المتصالحة (Arabic) Al-Imārāt al-Mutaṣāliḥa
- 1820–1971
- Flag of the Council (1968–1971) Emblem (1968–1971)

- Map of the Trucial States prior to the 1974 Treaty of Jeddah
- Status: Persian Gulf Residency of British India (1820–1947); Informal British protectorate (1947–1971)
- Capital: Abu Dhabi
- Common languages: Arabic; English
- Ethnic groups: 80% Arabs; 20% others (Note: Including Baluchis, Indians, Persians, and Africans)
- Religion: Sunni Islam
- Demonym: Trucials
- Government: Tribal confederation(s)
- Political Representatives
  - 1939–1940 (first): John Baron Howes
  - 1971 (last): Julian F. Walker
- Historical era: New Imperialism to Cold War
  - General Maritime Treaty: 8 January 1820
  - Perpetual Maritime Truce: 4 May 1853
  - Exclusive Agreement: 6–8 March 1892
  - Trucial States Council established: 21 March 1952
  - Seizure of Abu Musa and the Greater and Lesser Tunbs by the Imperial State of Iran: 29–30 November 1971
  - The British left the Trucial States: 30 November 1971
  - End of the British protectorate; Sheikhdoms became fully independent: 1 December 1971
  - United Arab Emirates: 2 December 1971

Population
  - 1968 census: 459,000
- Currency: Ottoman lira (1820–1899); Indian rupee (1899–1959); Gulf rupee (1959–1966); Bahraini dinar (1966–1971)
Preceded by
Abu Dhabi
Ajman
Dubai
Umm Al Quwain
Fujairah
Ras Al Khaimah
Sharjah
Succeeded by
United Arab Emirates
Ras Al Khaimah
- Today part of: United Arab Emirates

The Trucial States, (Note: Arabic: الإمارات المتصالحة, romanised: Al-Imārāt al-Mutaṣāliḥa) also known as the Trucial Coast, (Note: Arabic: الساحل المتصالح, romanised: Al-Sāḥil al-Mutaṣāliḥ) or the Trucial Sheikhdoms, (Note: Arabic: المشيخات المتصالحة, romanised: Al-Mashyakhāt al-Mutaṣāliḥa) or Trucial Oman, were a group of tribal confederations in southeastern Arabia along the Persian Gulf whose leaders had signed protective treaties with the British Empire between 1820 and 1892.

The Trucial States remained an informal British protectorate until the treaties were revoked on 1 December 1971. The following day, six of the sheikhdoms—Dubai, Abu Dhabi, Sharjah, Ajman, Umm Al Quwain and Fujairah—formed the United Arab Emirates; the seventh, Ras Al Khaimah, joined on 10 February 1972.

== Overview ==
The sheikhdoms included:

- Abu Dhabi (1820–1971)
- Ajman (1820–1971)
- Dubai (1833–1971)
- Fujairah (1952–1971)
- Kalba (1936–1951)
- Ras Al Khaimah (1820–1972)
- Sharjah (1820–1971)
- Umm Al Quwain (1820–1971)

The sheikhdoms allied themselves with the United Kingdom through a series of treaties, beginning with the General Maritime Treaty of 1820 and including the Perpetual Maritime Truce of 1853, until in 1892 they entered into "Exclusivity Agreements" with the British—following on from Bahrain in 1880—which put them under British protection. This was an unclear status (that of a "protected state") which fell short of a formal protectorate, but required Britain to defend them from external aggression in exchange for exclusive British rights in the states.

Two sheikhdoms at various times looked as if they might be granted trucial status, affirming their independence from neighbouring Sharjah, Al Hamriyah and Al Heera, but neither signed treaties with the British. Kalba, granted trucial status in 1936 because it was chosen as the site of a back-up landing strip for the Imperial Airways flights into Sharjah, was re-incorporated into Sharjah in 1951 on the death of its ruler.

The last sheikhdom to be granted recognition was that of Fujairah, which became a trucial state in 1952 after the British Government came under pressure from PCL (Petroleum Concessions Limited) to grant status so that the company could have a free hand to explore for oil along the whole east coast. (Note: PCL was a subsidiary of the Iraq Petroleum Company, with major shareholders being Anglo-Persian Oil Company (APOC), Royal Dutch/Shell, the Compagnie Française des Pétroles (CFP) and Near East Development Corporation (NEDC), an American syndicate of major oil companies.)

In 1952, the Trucial States Council was established to encourage co-operation among the seven rulers. The Indian rupee remained the de facto currency of the Trucial States as well as the other Persian Gulf states, such as Qatar, Bahrain, Kuwait and Oman, until the Gulf rupee was introduced in 1959. The Gulf rupee was used until the Gulf countries introduced their own currencies after the great devaluation of the rupee.

== 1820 treaty ==
The southeastern Persian Gulf coast was called the "Pirate Coast" by the British, who argued that raiders based there—particularly the 'Qawasim' or 'Joasmees', now known as the Al Qasimi (the ruling families of Sharjah and Ras Al Khaimah)—harassed British-flagged shipping.

The first in a long series of maritime skirmishes between the Al Qasimi and British vessels took place in 1797, when the British-flagged snow (a large two-masted ship) Bassein was seized and released two days later. The cruiser Viper was subsequently attacked off Bushire. The Al Qasimi leader, Saqr bin Rashid Al Qasimi, claimed innocence in both cases.

A period of great instability followed along the coast, with a number of actions between British and Al Qasimi vessels alongside various changes of leadership and allegiances between the rulers of Ras Al Khaimah, Ajman and Sharjah with Sheikh Sultan bin Saqr Al Qasimi claiming sovereignty over 'all the Joasmee ports' in 1823, a claim recognised by the British at the time.

British expeditions to protect British Indian trade and interests around Ras al-Khaimah, close to the Strait of Hormuz, led to campaigns against that headquarters and other harbours along the coast in 1809, and again (with far greater destructive force) in 1819. A peace treaty was signed in 1820 to which all the sheikhs of the coast adhered. The signatories to that treaty included Sultan bin Saqr Al Qasimi of Sharjah (on 6 January 1820). He signed a 'preliminary agreement' also on behalf of Ajman and Umm Al Qawain, and then on 8 January at Ras Al Khaimah, Hassan Bin Rahma Al Qasimi signed as "Sheikh of 'Hatt and Falna' formerly of Ras Al Khaimah" ('Hatt' being the modern day village of Khatt and 'Falna' being the modern day suburb of Ras Al Khaimah, Fahlain, near Al Falayah Fort), followed on 10 January 1820 by Qadib bin Ahmad of Jazirah Al Hamrah (given in the treaty's English translation as 'Jourat Al Kamra') signed.

On 11 January 1820, again at Ras Al Khaimah, Shakhbut bin Diyab Al Nahyan signed on behalf of his son, Tahnoon, the Sheikh of the Bani Yas and ruler of Abu Dhabi. Husain bin Ali of Rams signed on 15 January 1820. The uncle of Muhammad bin Hazza of Dubai signed on 28 January 1820 in Sharjah. The rulers of Ajman and Umm Al Quwain acceded to the full treaty on 15 March 1820, signing on board the ship of the commander of the British expeditionary force, Major-General William Keir Grant. The treaty was also signed, at Sharjah, by the emir of Bahrain.

The Sheikh of Rams lost the support of his people soon after and both he and the Sheikh of Jazirah Al Hamrah were deposed and their communities became subject to the rule of Ras Al Khaimah. However, the Al-Zaabi family continued to rule Jazirah Al Hamrah as vassals until 1970.

As a peace treaty, it was not a conspicuous success. Skirmishes and conflicts, considered raids by the British, continued intermittently until 1835, when the sheikhs agreed not to engage in hostilities at sea and Sharjah, Dubai, Ajman and Abu Dhabi signed a renewed treaty banning hostilities during the pearling season and a number of other short treaties were made, culminating with the ten-year truce of June 1843. Feeling the benefit of peaceful pearling and trade, the coastal Sheikhs signed the Perpetual Treaty of Maritime Peace in 1853, a process overseen by the British political agent at Bushire, Captain A. B. Kemball.

Separate treaties in 1847 and 1856 saw treaties undertaking the abolition of slave trading and, in 1873, a further treaty abolishing slaving was signed by Sharjah and Abu Dhabi.

== 1892 Exclusive Agreement ==
Primarily in reaction to the ambitions of France and Russia, Britain and the Trucial Sheikhdoms established closer bonds in an 1892 treaty, similar to treaties entered into by the UK with other Persian Gulf entities.

The sheikhs agreed not to dispose of any territory except to Britain and not to enter into relationships with any other foreign government without Britain's consent. In return, the British promised to protect the Trucial Coast from all aggression by sea and to help in case of land attack. This treaty, the "Exclusive Agreement", was signed by the Rulers of Abu Dhabi, Dubai, Sharjah, Ajman, Ras Al Khaimah and Umm Al Quwain between 6 and 8 March 1892. It was subsequently ratified by the Viceroy of India and the British Government in London.

== Advent of aeroplanes ==
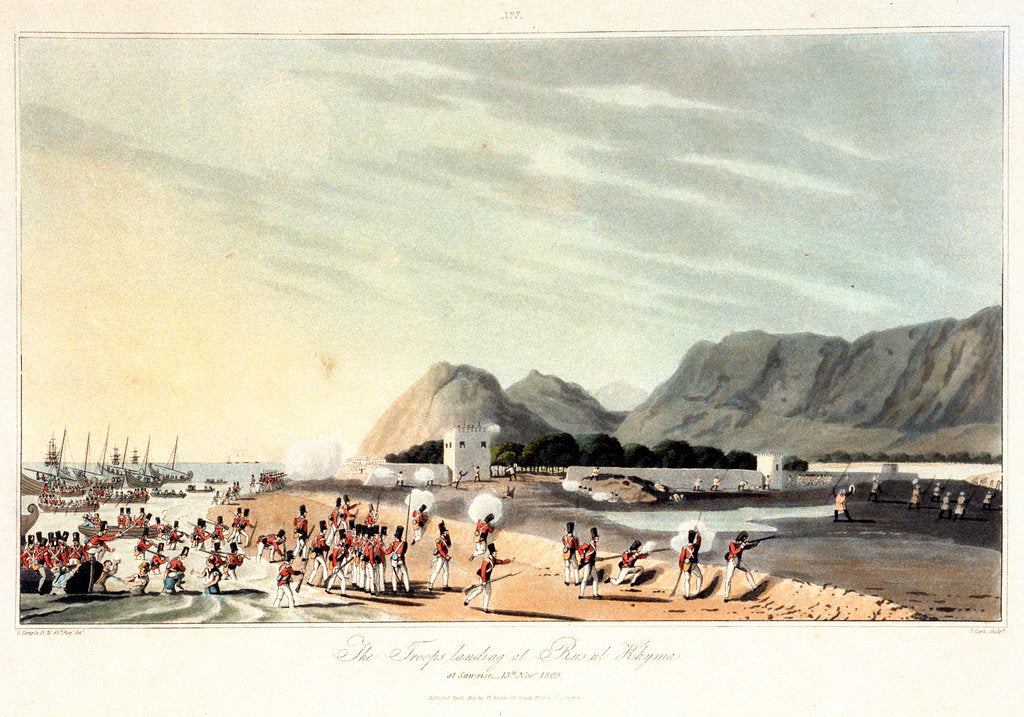
British naval fleet attack Ras Al Khaimah on 13 November 1809

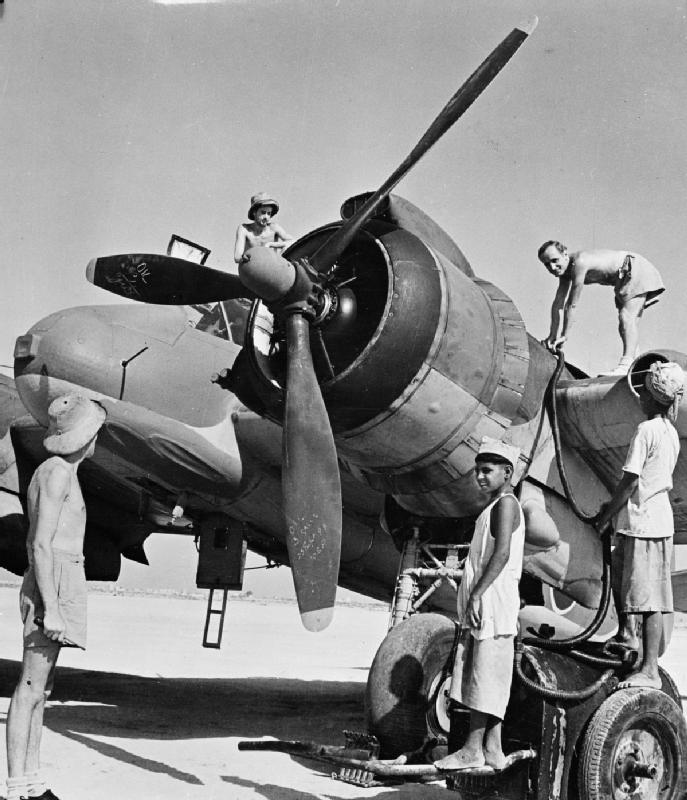
RAF at No. 44 Staging Post, Sharjah, Trucial States, c. 1945

In the 1920s, the British Government's desire to create an alternative air route from Great Britain to India gave rise to discussions with the rulers of the Trucial States about landing areas, anchorages and fuel depots along the coast. The first aeroplanes to appear were Royal Air Force (RAF) flying boats, used by RAF personnel to survey the area, and by political officers to visit the rulers. Air agreements were initially resisted by the rulers, who suspected interference with their sovereignty, however they also provided a useful source of revenue. In 1932, the demise of the air route through Persia led to the opening of an airfield at Sharjah. In 1937, Imperial Airways flying boats began to call in at Dubai, and continued to do so for the next ten years.

== Trucial States Council ==
The Trucial States Council was a forum for the leaders of the emirates to meet, presided over by the British Political Agent. The first meetings took place in 1952, one in spring and one in autumn, and this set a pattern for meetings in future years. The council was purely consultative and had no written constitution and no policy making powers, it provided more than anything a forum for the rulers to exchange views and agree on common approaches. The British provoked considerable irritation amongst the rulers, especially Sharjah and Ras Al Khaimah, when the ruler of Fujairah, recognised as a Trucial State by Britain on 21 March 1952, attended his first Trucial States Council.

By 1958, committees were set up to advise on public health, agriculture and education, but the council had no funding until 1965, when the chairmanship moved from the Political Agent to one of the rulers, the first chairman being Shaikh Saqr bin Mohammed Al Qasimi of Ras Al Khaimah. One issue which came up regularly in the council's first 14 meetings was that of locusts—the swarms were highly destructive to the agriculture of the whole area—but the Bedouin of the interior were convinced the spraying of insecticide would be detrimental to their herds and resisted the teams brought in from Pakistan to spray the insects' breeding grounds.

In 1965 the council was given a grant by the British to administer as it saw fit, instead of merely advising on British-prepared budgets. A full-time secretariat was also recruited.

== End ==
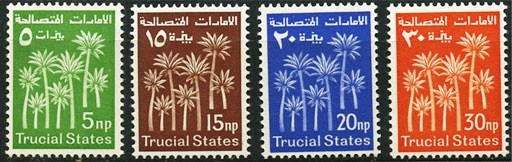
1961 Trucial States stamps, denominated in Gulf rupees.

Harold Wilson's announcement, on 16 January 1968, that all British troops were to be withdrawn from "east of Suez", signalled the end of Britain taking care of foreign policy and defence, as well as arbitrating between the rulers of the Eastern Persian Gulf.

The decision pitched the rulers of the Trucial Coast, together with Qatar and Bahrain, into fevered negotiations to fill the political vacuum that the British withdrawal would leave behind.

The principle of union was first agreed between the ruler of Abu Dhabi, Sheikh Zayed bin Sultan Al Nahyan, and Sheikh Rashid of Dubai on 18 February 1968 meeting in an encampment at Argoub Al Sedirah, near Al Semeih, a desert stop between the two emirates. The two agreed to work towards bringing the other emirates, including Qatar and Bahrain, into the union. Over the next two years, negotiations and meetings of the rulers followed—often stormy—as a form of union was worked out. British intervention in an October 1969 meeting resulted in a walk-out by Qatar and Ras Al Khaimah. Bahrain and Qatar dropped out of talks, leaving only six emirates to agree on union on 18 July 1971.

On 2 December 1971, Dubai, together with Abu Dhabi, Sharjah, Ajman, Umm Al Quwain and Fujairah joined in the Act of Union to form the United Arab Emirates. The seventh emirate, Ras Al Khaimah, officially joined the UAE on 10 February 1972. This change was due to the Iranian seizure of the islands Greater and Lesser Tunbs from Ras Al Khaimah and Abu Musa which was claimed by the emirate of Sharjah. The Iranian occupation of the three islands occurred on 30 November 1971 following the British withdrawal.

== See also ==
- British Raj
- Dunes (stamps)
- History of the United Arab Emirates
- List of British representatives in the Trucial States
- Persian Gulf Residency
- Piracy in the Persian Gulf
