= Al Falayah Fort =

18th-century fort in Ras Al Khaimah, United Arab Emirates

Coordinates: 25.7403°N 55.98°E

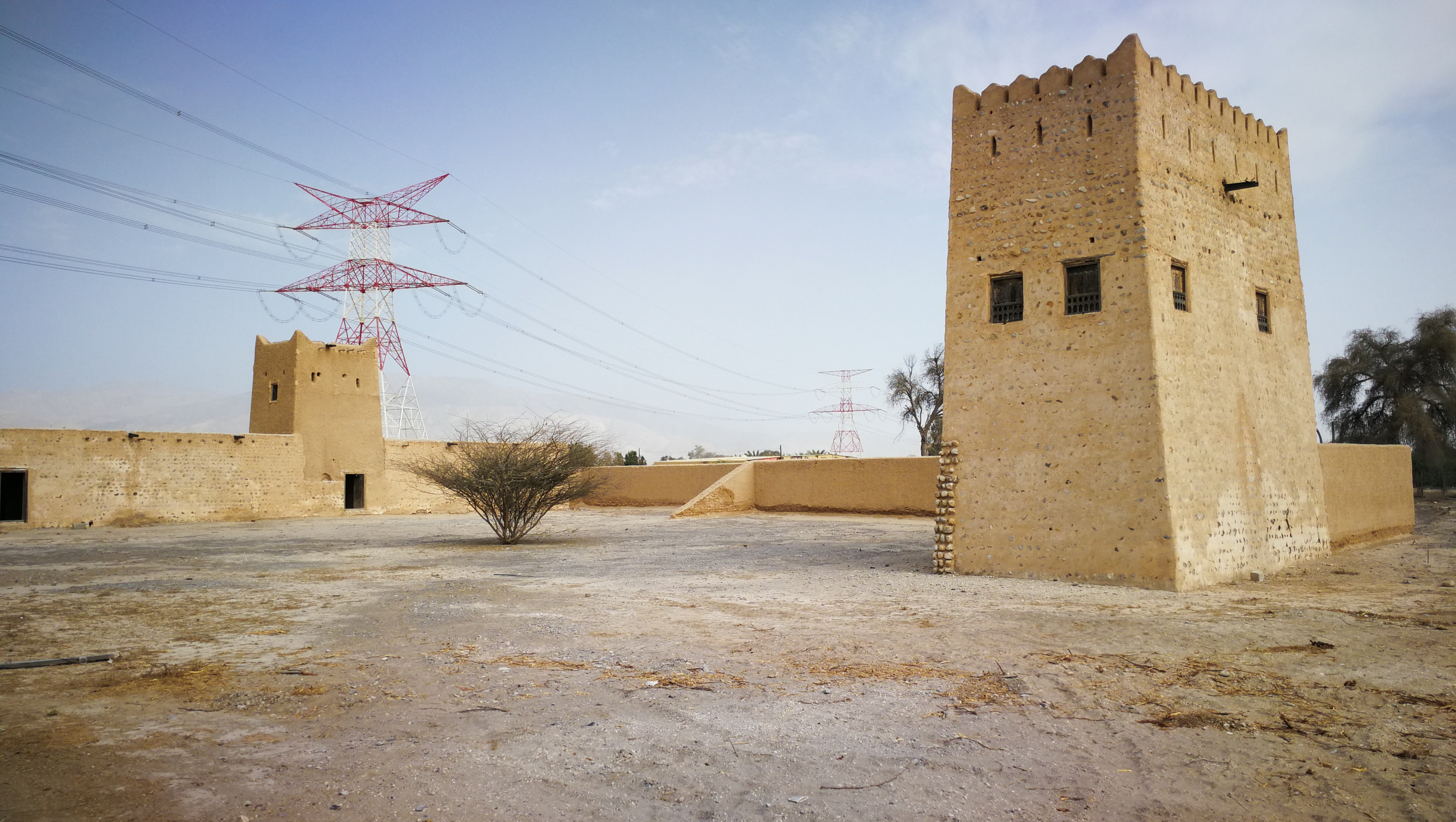
Al Falayah Fort in Ras Al Khaimah

Al Falayah fort is an 18th-century fort in Ras Al Khaimah, United Arab Emirates (UAE). Traditionally the summer residence of the ruling Al Qasimi family, the fort was used as a rest house.

== Background ==
The fort is closely associated with the events surrounding the General Maritime Treaty of 1820. In late 1819 a British naval expedition, the Persian Gulf campaign of 1819, was launched against the Qawasim and destroyed much of the town of Ras Al Khaimah. In its aftermath the British commander, Major-General William Keir Grant, negotiated peace terms with the sheikhs of the lower Gulf, and Al Falayah Fort – the Qasimi summer seat lying inland of the town – was chosen as the venue for the principal signing.

== The General Maritime Treaty of 1820 ==
The Preliminary agreements to the treaty had earlier been signed on 6 January 1820 by Sultan bin Saqr Al Qasimi, then at mid-day on 8 January 1820 in Ras Al Khaimah by Major-General William Keir Grant together with Hassan Bin Rahmah Sheikh of 'Hatt and Falna' (Hatt being modern day Khatt) and Rajib bin Ahmed Al-Zaabi, Sheikh of 'Jourat al Kamra' (Jazirat Al Hamra). A translation was prepared by Captain JP Thompson.

Further Preliminary Agreements were then signed on 9 January by the Sheikh of Dubai, 11 January in Ras Al Khaimah by Sheikh Shakbout of 'Aboo Dhebbee' (Abu Dhabi) and on 15 January by Hassan bin Ali, Sheikh of 'Zyah'.at Sharjah.

The General Treaty for the Cessation of Plunder and Piracy by Land and Sea, Dated February 5, 1820 was then signed by Hassan bin Rahmah Al Qasimi, ‘Sheikh of Khatt and Falayah’ (who had, by signing the Preliminary agreement, given up his title as ruler of Ras Al Khaimah) and Qadhib bin Ahmad of Jazirat Al Hamra, both signing at Falayah Fort on 8 January 1820. Sheikh Shakhbut bin Dhiyab Al Nahyan of Abu Dhabi signed at Ras Al Khaimah on 11 January on behalf of his son, Sheikh Tahnun bin Shakhbut, and Hussein bin Ali of Rams and Dhayah on 15 January, coincidentally the day of his release by the British from captivity. Zaid bin Saif signed on behalf of the Ruler of Dubai, who was still in his minority, on 28 January. Sultan bin Saqr Al Qasimi of Sharjah signed the treaty in Sharjah town on 4 February and, on 5 February, the treaty was signed in Sharjah on behalf of the Sheikhs of Bahrain (who themselves ratified it in Bahrain later that month).

The treaty was to lead to the recognition by the British of the Trucial States, to a series of further treaties formalising the British Protectorate over the Trucial States and eventually to the process leading to the formation of the modern United Arab Emirates on 2 December 1971.
