= Hassan bin Rahma Al Qasimi =

- Sheikh

Ruler of Ras Al Khaimah
- Reign: 1814–1820
- Predecessor: Sultan Bin Saqr Al Qasimi
- Successor: Sultan Bin Saqr Al Qasimi as ruler of Sharjah and later Ras Al Khaimah
- House: Al Qasimi

Hassan bin Rahma Al Qasimi was the Sheikh (ruler) of Ras Al Khaimah from 1814–1820. He was accused by the British of presiding over a number of acts of maritime piracy, an assertion he consistently denied.

Despite signing a treaty of peace with the British in October 1814, a punitive expeditionary force was mounted against Ras Al Khaimah in December 1819 and Hassan bin Rahma Al Qasimi was removed as Sheikh of Ras Al Khaimah, which he ceded to the British in a preliminary agreement to the General Maritime Treaty of 1820.

== Rule ==
The nephew of the Ruler of Emirate of Ras Al Khaimah, Sultan bin Saqr Al Qasimi, Hassan bin Rahma emerged as the de facto Ruler of Ras Al Khaimah in 1814, although it is likely his rule started before this time. His Uncle Sultan bin Saqr had been imprisoned in Diriyah by the Saudis but later made his escape via Mokha in Yemen and was taken in by the Sultan of Muscat, Said bin Sultan, - his old enemy. Restoring Sultan bin Saqr to Ras Al Khaimah as a puppet of Muscat could well have been one of the British aims if their Persian Gulf campaign of 1809 had been better executed.

Said bin Sultan of Muscat mounted an expedition to Ras Al Khaimah in 1813, aiming for the restoration of the deposed Sultan bin Saqr Al Qasimi, it having been understood that Sultan would acknowledge Muscat's suzerainty. The British supported the idea and the Sultan gained assistance from the Bani Yas of Abu Dhabi but was nevertheless repulsed by Hussain bin Ali, the Wahhabi Wali in Ras Al Khaimah.

Hassan bin Rahma was effectively a dependent of the ruler of the first Saudi state, Abdulla Ibn Saud (and his father Saud bin Abdulaziz before him). During a visit to Abdulla in Riyadh in August 1814, Hassan bin Rahma received a letter from the British Resident at Bushire accusing him of responsibility for the theft of two boats from Bombay laden with grain. The boats were apparently appropriated by six Qawasim boats off Karachi on 14 January 1814, although the British agent's letter asserts that Qawasim vessels had captured six or eight boats off the coasts of Karachi and Sind.

Hassan denied the charges, pointing out that the Qawasim boats did, indeed, travel to Sind where they traded. However, he also made a careful distinction between British subjects and native craft of Indian origin and denied capturing any boat with British passes and colours. This was accepted by the Bushire Resident, William Bruce.

A further attempt, in 1814, was successful in restoring Sultan bin Saqr as ruler of Sharjah and Lingeh - again with the support of the Bani Yas. By now, his nephew Hassan bin Rahmah Al Qasimi had eclipsed Hussain bin Ali as Ruler of Ras Al Khaimah and he now entered into a treaty with the British on 6 October 1814, following the long correspondence with Bruce in which he claimed innocence of piracy, noted that regional conflicts were complex and enmities deep-rooted and requested clarity on quite what constituted ‘British shipping’. Hassan bin Rahmah agreed that the Qawasim boats should fly a red and white flag which would distinguish them from other interests sailing in the Gulf and Indian Ocean. The agreement opened British ports to Qawasim shipping.

=== Accusations of piracy ===
However, soon after the signature of the agreement, a British boat was seized as it visited Ras Al Khaimah with letters for Hassan bin Rahma from Bruce and the envoy had suffered 'the most degrading treatment.' A series of incidents of 'piracy and plunder' then followed over the following four years, with the Al Qasimi laid firmly to blame by historian J. G. Lorimer, who asserted that the Qawasim "now indulged in a carnival of maritime lawlessness, to which even their own previous record presented no parallel".

British accusations against the Al Qasimi at this time have been described as the result of a combination of acts of legitimate war by them against Muscat (with which they were at war) and confusion with Qatari pirate Rahma bin Jabir. Whether the accusations were baseless, forming part of an attempt to curb Arab trade with India on the part of the East India Company (the argument put forward by Sultan bin Muhammad Al Qasimi in his Myth of Piracy in the Arabian Gulf), is still being debated. However, the decision to act against the ‘Pirate Coast’ was by no means consensual in Bombay.

Early in 1816, the Sultan of Muscat mounted an expedition to attempt a blockade of Ras Al Khaimah, which turned out to be ineffectual. At around the same time, the Qawasim took possession of an armed pattamar manned by native sailors, the Deriah Dawlut, killing seventeen of its thirty-eight Indian crew. A number of other actions against native and other shipping took place, particularly off the coast of Muscat. On the 26 November 1816, the British visited Ras Al Khaimah and delivered an ulitmatum, demanding reparations and the delivery of two of Hassan bin Rahma's children as security against his good comportment. He also rather sharpy pointed out that the Qawasim didn't regard India beyond Bombay and Mangalore to be owned by Britain and that while the Qawasim would respect the rights of Christians, they saw no need to extend that nicety to idolatrous Hindus and other 'unbelievers' of India. The British opened fire against the Ras Al Khaimah boats at harbour, but found their fire hotly returned with cannonades from the fort and towers onshore. Their retreat could only be considered ignominious.

An eyewitness at the time estimated the Qawasim fleet at a hundred significant vessels mounting 400 cannons and some 8,000 fighting men. It was a testament to the failure of 1809.

In March 1819 Hassan bin Rahma went to the Ruler of Bahrain, Abdulla bin Ahmed, to mediate with the British and a release of prisoners (17 British subjects, all Indian women, were delivered to the British). His complaints to the British fell on deaf ears, as did his offer (of September 1819) to send three emissaries to negotiate a peace. Arriving at Bushire, his three representatives were turned back. The British had clearly made their resolution.

== The fall of Ras Al Khaimah ==
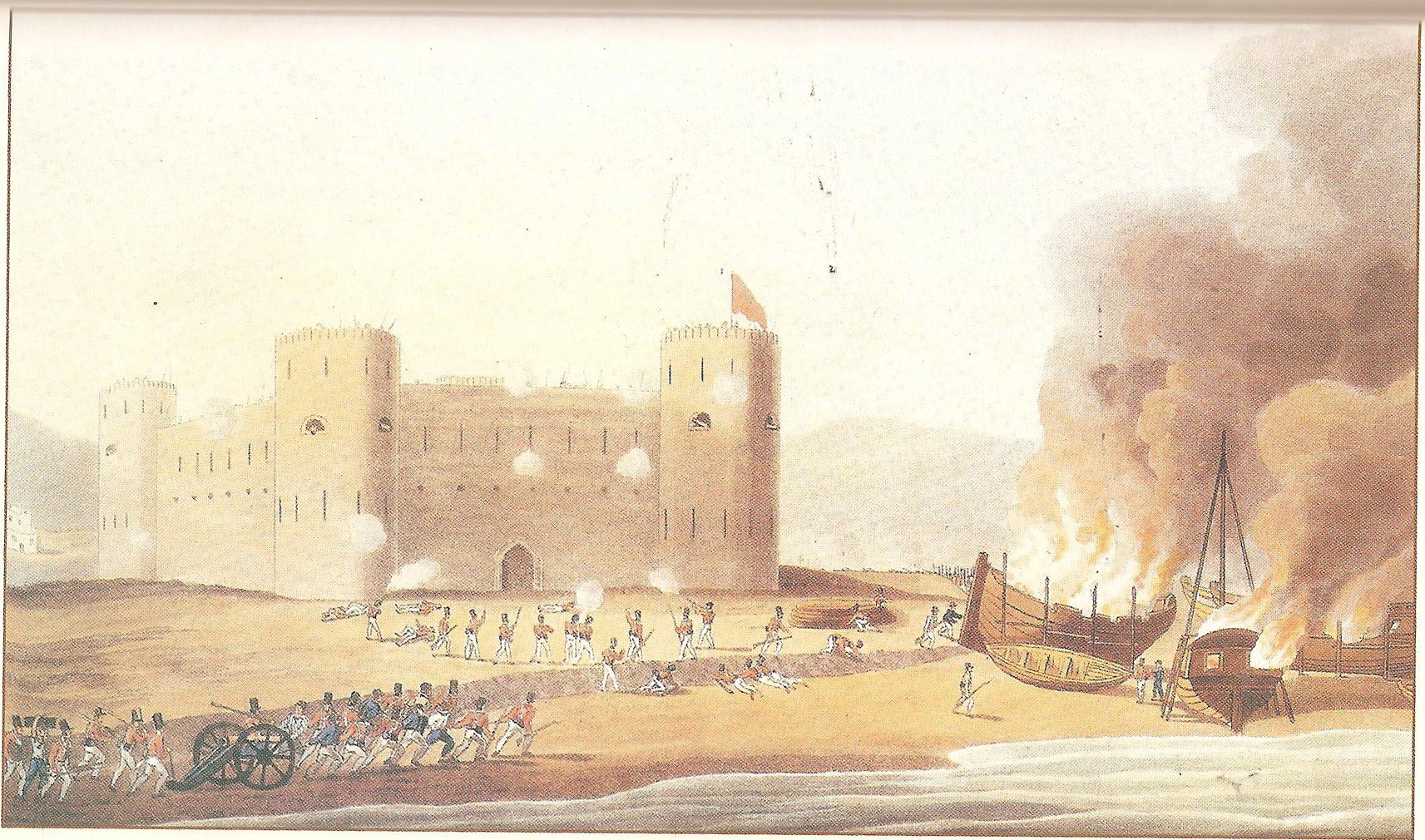
Ras Al Khaimah under attack by the British in December 1819

In November 1819, the British embarked on an expedition against Ras Al Khaimah, led by Major-General William Keir Grant, with a platoon of 3,000 soldiers. The British extended an offer to Said bin Sultan of Muscat in which he would be made ruler of the Pirate Coast if he agreed to assist the British in their expedition. Obligingly, he sent a force of 600 men and two ships.

The force gathered off the coast of Ras Al Khaimah on 25 and 26 November. On 2 and 3 December, troops were landed and, on 5 December, the town was bombarded from both land and sea. Continued bombardment took place over the following four days. The British dragged two twenty-four-pound guns from HMS Liverpool across the sandy beach and mounted them overlooking the town, commencing fire on the morning of 8 December. By the evening, under the fire from these huge cannon, flags of truce were sent from the town's crumbling fort. The request for a truce was ignored.

The next morning, the twenty-four-pounders once again opened fire, significantly breaching the fortified walls of the town and allowing the British storming party to stream into the deserted settlement. On the fall of Ras Al Khaimah, three cruisers were sent to blockade Rams to the North and this, too was found to be deserted and its inhabitants retired to the 'impregnable' hill-top fort of Dhayah. The fort fell on 22 December, again to the Liverpool's huge guns.

The rout of Ras Al Khaimah led to only five British casualties as opposed to the 400 to 1,000 casualties reportedly suffered by the Qawasim. Sixty-two guns were captured, most of which were found to be unserviceable. However, a large number of captured goats delighted the ever-hungry sailors and soldiers. Some 80 boats, ranging from forty to 250 tons, were captured but there was little beyond goats by way of plunder: the town was emptied of people and goods alike. Hassan bin Rahmah Al Qasimi, and his followers surrendered to the British.

The town of Ras Al Khaimah was blown up and a garrison was established there, consisting of 800 sepoys and artillery. The expedition then visited Jazirat Al Hamra, which was deserted, but then went on to destroy the fortifications and larger vessels of Umm Al Qawain, Ajman, Fasht, Sharjah, Abu Hail and Dubai. Ten vessels which had taken shelter in Bahrain were also destroyed.

== General Maritime Treaty ==
Defeated, Hassan bin Rahma gave himself up to the British and was imprisoned, but released when it was realised his imprisonment was widely unpopular. He signed a preliminary agreement which ceded the town of Ras Al Khaimah and the area of Maharah to the British for use as a garrison.

The General Treaty for the Cessation of Plunder and Piracy by Land and Sea, dated 5 February 1820 was signed at variously at Ras Al Khaimah, Falayah Fort and Sharjah by the Sheikhs of Abu Dhabi, Sharjah, Ajman, Umm Al Quwain and Ras Al Khaimah and the British.

Hassan bin Rahma signed the treaty as "Sheikh of 'Hatt and Falna', formerly of Ras Al Khaimah" ('Hatt' being the modern day village of Khatt and 'Falna' being the modern day suburb of Ras Al Khaimah, Fahlain near the location of Al Falayah Fort).

The treaty having been signed by William Keir Grant and all of the Trucial Rulers, the Government in Bombay made clear that it was most dissatisfied with his leniency over the coastal tribes and desired, 'if it were not too late, to introduce some conditions of greater stringency'. The release of Husain bin Ali, the Wahhabi leader and chief of Rams and Dhayah, was particularly regretted.

Hassan bin Rahma was deposed in 1820 and Sheikh Sultan Bin Saqr Al Qasimi, Ruler of Sharjah, became Ruler of Ras Al Khaimah.
