= General Maritime Treaty of 1820 =

1820 treaty establishing the Trucial States

The General Maritime Treaty of 1820 was initially signed between the rulers of Abu Dhabi, Sharjah, Ajman, Umm Al Quwain, Ras Al Khaimah and Great Britain in January 1820, with the nearby island state of Bahrain acceding to the treaty in the following February. Its full title was the "General Treaty for the Cessation of Plunder and Piracy by Land and Sea, Dated February 5, 1820".

The treaty was signed following decades of maritime conflict in the Persian Gulf, with British, French, and Omani flagged ships involved in a series of disputes and actions that were characterized by officials of the British East India Company as acts of piracy on the part of the dominant local maritime force, the Qawasim. It led to the establishment of the British protectorate over the Trucial States, which would last until the independence of the United Arab Emirates on 2 December 1971.

== British expedition ==
The treaty followed the fall of Ras Al Khaimah, Rams and Dhayah to a punitive British expedition mounted from Bombay in 1819, principally targeting the fleet of the Qawasim, a seafaring tribe who the British had accused of "piracy and plunder." Ras Al Khaimah fell to the force on 9 December 1819, with Dhayah falling on 22 December.

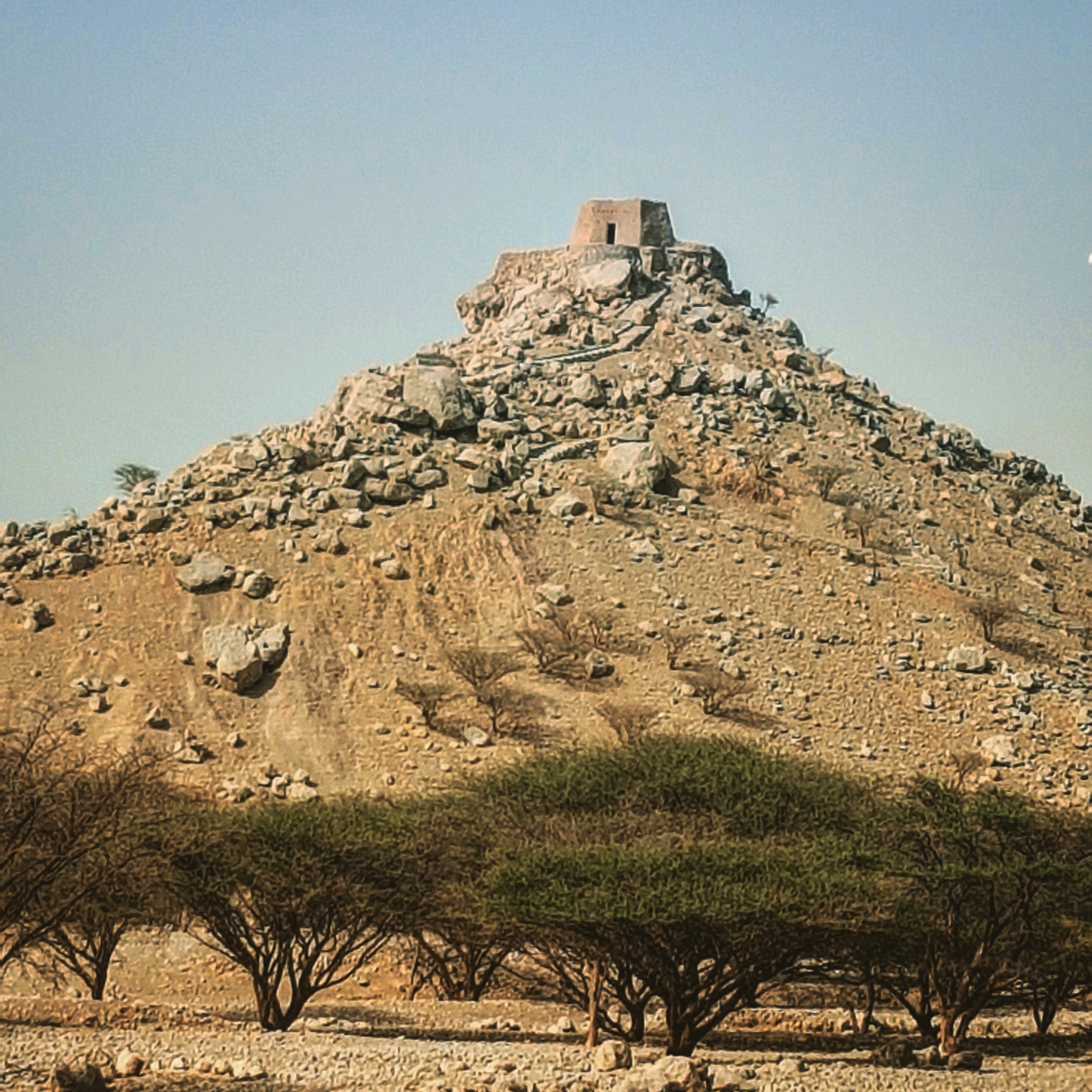
Dhayah Fort today.

The British expeditionary force then blew up the town of Ras Al Khaimah and established a garrison there of 800 sepoys and artillery, before visiting Jazirat Al Hamra, which was found to be deserted. They went on to destroy the fortifications and larger vessels of Umm Al Qawain, Ajman, Fasht, Sharjah, Abu Hail, and Dubai. Ten vessels that had taken shelter in Bahrain were also destroyed. The Royal Navy suffered no casualties during the action.

With the Sheikhs of these communities either in captivity or choosing to give themselves up, a treaty was proposed in order to govern peaceful relationships in the future. The treaty opens, "In the name of God, the merciful, the compassionate! Praise be to God, who hath ordained peace to be a blessing to his creatures." Under the auspices of the UK's representative Sir William Keir Grant, the treaty prohibited piracy in the Persian Gulf, banned some forms of slavery, and required all usable ships to be registered with British forces by flying distinctive red and white flags, which exist today as the flags of the respective emirates.

The treaty was part of the UK's strategic policy of ensuring an open line of communication between the British Raj and the home islands, by excluding rival European powers from the Persian Gulf region, notably Russia and France. Britain also sought to pacify the Persian Gulf by preserving the independence of Qajar Iran, the Ottoman Empire, and the Emirate of Nejd.

== Preliminary agreements ==
Many of the sheikhs signatory to the 1820 treaty had made prior agreements with the British. The Ruler of Ras Al Khaimah ceded the town itself and the area of Maharah to the British for use as a garrison, and most other coastal sheikhs ceded boats and armaments in return for an undertaking that the British would not enter or lay waste to their towns. Ajman, Umm Al Qawain, and Sharjah all came under one preliminary agreement signed with Sheikh Sultan bin Saqr, while others were undertaken with the Rulers of Dubai, Abu Dhabi, and Khatt and Falayah. Like the 1820 treaty, this last preliminary agreement was signed by Hassan bin Rahma Al Qasimi, formerly Sheikh of Ras Al Khaimah.

== Agreements ==
The first article of the treaty says, "There shall be a cessation of plunder and piracy by land and sea on the part of the Arabs, who are parties to this contract, for ever." It goes on to define piracy as any attack that is not an action of "acknowledged war". The "pacificated Arabs" agree, on land and sea, to carry a flag being a red rectangle contained within a white border of equal width to the contained rectangle, "with or without letters on it, at their option". This flag was to be a symbol of peace with the British government and each other.

The vessels of the "friendly Arabs" were to carry a paper (register), signed by their chief and detailing the vessel. They should also carry a documented port clearance, which would name the "Nacodah" (today generally spelled nakhuda), crew, and number of armed men on board, as well as the port of origin and destination. They would produce these on request to any British or other vessel that requested them. The treaty also makes provision for the exchange of envoys, for the "friendly Arabs" to act in concert against outside forces, and to desist from putting people to death after they have given up their arms or to carry them off as slaves. The treaty prohibits the enslaving "from the coasts of Africa or elsewhere" or the carrying of slaves in their vessels. The "friendly Arabs", flying the agreed flag, would be free to enter, leave, and trade with British ports, and "if any should attack them, the British Government will take notice of it."

== Signatories ==
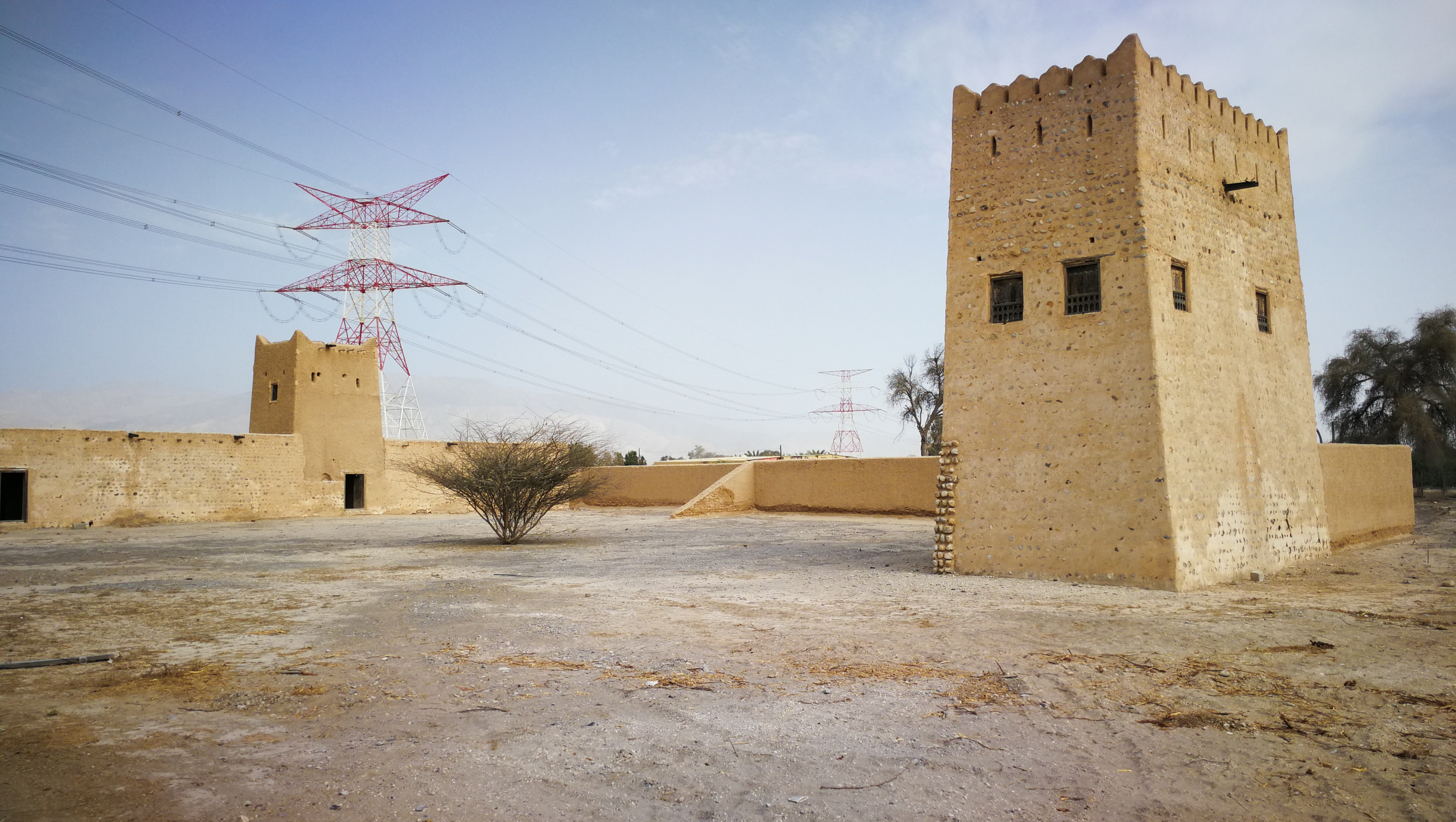
Al Falayah Fort

The treaty was issued in triplicate and signed at mid-day on 8 January 1820 in Ras Al Khaimah by Major-General Keir Grant together with Hassan bin Rahma Al-Qassimi, Sheikh of 'Hatt and Falna' ('Hatt' being the modern day village of Khatt and 'Falna' being the modern day suburb of Ras Al Khaimah, Fahlain near Al Falayah Fort) and Rajib bin Ahmed Al-Zaabi, Sheikh of 'Jourat al Kamra' (Jazirah Al Hamra). A translation was prepared by Captain JP Thompson.

The treaty was then signed on 11 January 1820 in Ras Al Khaimah by Sheikh Shakbout of 'Aboo Dhebbee' (Abu Dhabi) and on 15 January by Hassan bin Ali, Sheikh of Rams and Al Dhaya (named on the treaty document as 'Sheikh of 'Zyah'). The treaty was subsequently signed in Sharjah by Saeed bin Saif of Dubai (on behalf of Mohammed bin Haza bin Zaal, the Sheikh of Dubai was in his minority) on 28 January 1820 and then in Sharjah again by Sultan bin Suggur, Sheikh of Sharjah and Ras Al Khaimah (at Falayah Fort) on 4 February 1820. On 15 March 1820 Rashid bin Humaid, Sheikh of Ajman and Abdullah bin Rashid, Sheikh of Umm Al Qawain, both signed at Falayah.

The treaty bears some quaint spellings of the names of the signatories ('Abdoola bin Rashid'), the dates ('the month of Rubee-oos-Sanee'), and the territories ('Aboo Dhebbee', Shargah, Ejman, and Umm ool Keiweyn'). Nevertheless, it led to the recognition by the British of the Trucial States and to a series of further treaties formalising the British Protectorate over the Trucial States and eventually to the process leading to the formation of the modern United Arab Emirates on 2 December 1971.

== Bombay reaction ==
The treaty having been signed by Grant and all of the Trucial Rulers, the Government in Bombay made clear that while it was happy with Grant's management of the military expedition, it was dissatisfied with his leniency over the coastal tribes and desired, 'if it were not too late, to introduce some conditions of greater stringency'. The release of Husain bin Ali, the Wahhabi leader and chief of Rams and Dhayah, was particularly regretted. In Bombay's opinion, the treaty should have forbade the building of coastal fortifications, restricted shipbuilding and stipulated powers of search and confiscation as well as empowering British forces to destroy any construction undertaken in the face of the prohibition. Grant's response pointed out that to have enforced extreme measures would have meant pursuing the chiefs into the interior rather than accepting their voluntary submission. This would have contravened Grant's instructions. In the end, Bombay allowed the treaty to stand.

== Aftermath ==
The British attempted to get Sheikh Sultan bin Saqr Al Qasimi to agree to additional stipulations to the treaty in return for British recognition of his role as Ruler of Ras Al Khaimah, but he refused. The officer in charge, Captain Thomas Perronet Thompson, had no authority to prevent Sultan taking over the town when British troops had left and, with no other way of forcing him to agree to the additional codicils, he blew up the sad remains of Ras Al Khaimah and on 18 July, the British forces embarked for the island of Qeshm.

The treaty, or perhaps more accurately the memory of the punitive actions that had preceded its signing, virtually eliminated piracy on the coast as a profession and, although there were occasional incidents, the level of maritime conflict – particularly against foreign vessels – dropped dramatically. The Government in Bombay continued to press for more stringent measures against the coastal sheikhs, including an incident in 1823 when a tower erected in Ras Al Khaimah was forcibly demolished. With the garrison in Ras Al Khaimah withdrawing to Qishm and then giving way to a policy of maritime patrol and the establishment of a native Political Agent in Sharjah in 1823, British actions were reduced to occasional visits to enforce the rule of law along the coast. A brief resurgence in excursions from the boats of the newly established community in Dubai in 1834 was quelled by a demonstration of British naval power in 1835.

In the aftermath of the treaty, the British were faced with a stark choice: whether to make the Sultan of Muscat the ruler of the entirety of the 'Trucial coast', or whether to support the coastal rulers in a semi-suzerainty, a 'protectorate' as it was to become. Meanwhile, the town of Ras Al Khaimah, devastated in the 1819 campaign, did not start to re-emerge with new buildings until 1828.

== Following treaties ==
The 1820 treaty was followed by the 1847 'Engagement to Prohibit Exportation of Slaves From Africa on board of Vessels Belonging to Bahrain and to the Trucial States and the Allow Right of Search of April–May 1847'. By this time, some of the smaller sheikhdoms had been subsumed by their larger neighbours and signatories were Sheikh Sultan bin Saqr of Ras Al Khaimah; Sheikh Maktoum of Dubai; Sheikh Abdulaziz of Ajman, Sheikh Abdullah bin Rashid of Umm Al Quwain and Sheikh Saeed bin Tahnoun of Abu Dhabi.

=== Perpetual Maritime Truce ===
In 1853, the Perpetual Maritime Truce of 4 May 1853 prohibited any act of aggression at sea and was signed by Abdulla bin Rashid of Umm Al Quwain; Hamed bin Rashid of Ajman; Saeed bin Butti of Dubai; Saeed bin Tahnoun ('Chief of the Beniyas') and Sultan bin Saqr ('Chief of the Joasmees'). A further engagement for the suppression of the slave trade was signed in 1856 and then in 1864, the 'Additional Article to the Maritime Truce Providing for the Protection of the Telegraph Line and Stations, Dated 1864'. An agreement regarding the treatment of absconding debtors followed in June 1879.

=== Exclusive Agreement ===
Signed in 1892, the 'Exclusive Agreement' bound the rulers not to enter into 'any agreement or correspondence with any Power other than the British Government' and that without British assent, they would not 'consent to the residence within my territory of the agent of any other government' and that they would not 'cede, sell, mortgage or otherwise give for occupation any part of my territory, save to the British Government.

The agreement came at a time when commercial interest was being shown in the Trucial States by other nations, including Persia, Germany, Turkey and France. Immediately before the signing of the agreement, a representative of the Persian Government had attempted to establish a Persian claim to the territory, bypassing any British interest. The 1892 agreement ended the attempt and effectively cemented the status of the Trucial States as a British protectorate, although did not formally confer protectorate status on the Trucial States.

== See also ==
- Persian Gulf campaign of 1809
- British residency of the Persian Gulf
- Pax Britannica
