= Persian Gulf campaign of 1819 =

British punitive expedition in the Middle East

- Part of Piracy in the Persian Gulf
- 1819 manuscript plan of the attack on Ras Al Khaimah ("Ras Ul Khyma") under Sir William Grant Keir (3–9 December 1819).
| Date | 3 November 1819 — 22 December 1819 |
| Location | Strait of Hormuz and Ras Al Khaimah |
| Result | British victory: Hassan bin Rahma Al Qasimi deposed; Sultan bin Saqr al-Qasimi restored as ruler; Signing of the General Maritime Treaty of 1820 |

Belligerents
| United Kingdom: East India Company; Supported by Omani Empire | Ras Al Khaimah: Al-Qawasim |

Commanders and leaders
| William Grant Keir; Said bin Sultan | Hassan bin Rahma; Sultan bin Saqr |

Strength
| Ras Al Khaimah: 3,000 troops 600 troops and 2 ships Dhayah: Unknown; Further operations: Unknown | Ras Al Khaimah: Unknown; Dhayah: 400 men Further operations: Unknown |

Casualties and losses
| Ras Al Khaimah: 5 killed and wounded Dhayah: 4 killed 16 wounded Further operations: None | Ras Al Khaimah: 400 killed and wounded Dhayah: Unknown; Further operations: Unknown; 10 vessels burned |

The Persian Gulf campaign of 1819 was a British punitive expedition, principally against the Arab maritime force of the Qawasim in the Persian Gulf, which embarked from Bombay, India in November 1819 to attack Ras Al Khaimah. The campaign was militarily successful for the British and led to the signing of the General Maritime Treaty of 1820 between the British and the Sheikhs of what was then known as the "Pirate Coast" and would become known as the Trucial Coast or Trucial States after this treaty. Today, the Trucial States comprise the United Arab Emirates.

== Background ==
After decades of incidents where British shipping had fallen foul of the aggressive Qawasim, an expeditionary force embarked for Ras Al Khaimah in 1809. This campaign led to the signing of a peace treaty between the British and Hassan Bin Rahmah, the Al Qasimi leader. This broke down in 1815. J. G. Lorimer contends that after the dissolution of the arrangement, the Qawasim "now indulged in a carnival of maritime lawlessness, to which even their own previous record presented no parallel".

Between the 1809 expedition and 1814, the Qawasim split into two factions: One faction was based at Ras Al Khaimah and supported the Wahhabis. The other faction was based in Sharjah and Lengeh, but still agreed with Wahhabi policies to some extent.

In 1815, the crew of a British Indian vessel were captured by Qawasim near Muscat and most of the crew were murdered. Then, on 6 January Al Qasimi captured an armed pattamar, the Deriah Dowlut, off the coast of Dwarka and murdered 17 of its 38 Indian crew. In the Red Sea, in 1816, three British-flagged Indian merchant vessels from Surat were taken and most of the crews killed.

Following the incident involving the Surat vessels (said to have been carried out by Amir Ibrahim, a cousin to the Al Qasimi Ruler Hassan Bin Rahmah) an investigation took place and Ariel was despatched to Ras Al Khaimah from Bushire, to where it returned with a flat denial of involvement in the affair from the Qawasim who were also at pains to point out they had not undertaken to recognise 'idolatrous Hindus' as British subjects, let alone anyone from the West Coast of India other than Bombay and Mangalore.

A small squadron assembled off Ras Al Khaimah and, on Sheikh Hassan continuing to be 'obstinate', opened fire on four vessels anchored there. Firing from too long a range, the squadron expended some 350 rounds to no effect; it then disbanded, visiting other ports on the coast. Unsurprisingly, given this ineffective 'punishment', Lorimer reports "The temerity of the pirates increased" and further raids on shipping followed, including the taking of "an Arab vessel but officered by Englishmen and flying English colours" just 70 miles North of Bombay.

After an additional year of recurring incidents, at the end of 1818 Hassan bin Rahmah made conciliatory overtures to Bombay that were "sternly rejected." Naval resources commanded by the Qawasim during this period were estimated at 60 large boats headquartered in Ras Al Khaimah, carrying from 80 to 300 men each, as well as 40 smaller vessels housed in other nearby ports.

The case made against the Qawasim has been contested by the historian, author and Ruler of Sharjah, Sultan bin Mohammed Al Qasimi in his book The Myth of Arab Piracy in the Gulf, in which he argues that the charges amount to a 'causus belli' by the East India Company, which sought to limit or eliminate the 'informal' Arab trade with India, and presents a number of internal communications between the Bombay Government and its officials, which shed doubt on many of the key charges made by Lorimer in his history of the affair.

At the time, the Chief Secretary of the Government of Bombay, F. Warden, presented a minute which laid blame for the piracy on the Wahhabi influence on the Al Qasimi and the interference of the East India Company in native affairs. In fact, it was Warden, in his 1819 Historical sketch of the Joasmee Arabs, who stated that up until the close of 1804, the Qawasim committed no act of piracy but, with the exception of the attacks on the Bassein and Viper cruisers, manifested every respect to the British flag. Warden successfully argued against a proposal to install the Sultan of Muscat as Ruler of the whole peninsula. Warden's arguments and proposals likely influenced the shape of the eventual treaty concluded with the Sheikhs of the Gulf coast.

== Campaign ==
On 3 November 1819, the British embarked on an expedition against the Qawasim, led by Major-General William Keir Grant, voyaging to Ras Al Khaimah with a force of 3,000 soldiers. The British extended an offer to Said bin Sultan of Muscat in which he would be made ruler of the Pirate Coast if he agreed to assist the British in their expedition. Obligingly, he sent a force of 600 men and two ships. The naval force consisted of Liverpool, Eden, Curlew, and a number of gun and mortar boats. Captain Collier, of Liverpool, 'led the naval force. The Bombay Marine of the East India Company (EIC) contributed six armed vessels: the 16-gun Teignmouth under the command of Captain Hall, the EIC senior captain, the 16-gun Benares, the 14-gun Aurora, the 14-gun Nautilus, the 12-gun Ariel, and the 12-gun Vestal. Later two frigates and 600 men belonging to the Sultan of Muscat joined the expedition.

On the army side, Grant commanded some 3,000 troops in transports, including the 47th and 65th Regiments of Foot, the 1st Battalion of the 2nd Regiment of Native Infantry, the flank companies of the 1st Battalion of the 3rd Regiment of Native Infantry and of the Marine Battalion, and half a company of Pioneers. In all, 1,645 European soldiers and marines and 1,424 Indian sepoys took part in the expedition.

The force gathered off the coast of Ras Al Khaimah on 25 and 26 November and, on 2 and 3 December, troops were landed south of the town and set up batteries of guns and mortars and, on 5 December, the town was bombarded from both land and sea. Collier placed Captain Walpole of Curlew in charge of the gun boats and an armed pinnace to protect the landing, which was, however, unopposed. The bombardment of the town commenced on 6 December, from landed batteries of 12 pound guns and mortars as well as from sea. On 7 December, two 24-pound cannon from Liverpool were added to the land batteries.

The rout of Ras Al Khaimah led to only five British casualties as opposed to the 400 to 1000 casualties reportedly suffered by the Al Qasimi.

=== The fall of Dhayah Fort ===
On the fall of Ras Al Khaimah, three cruisers were sent to blockade the town of Rams to the North and this, too was found to be deserted.

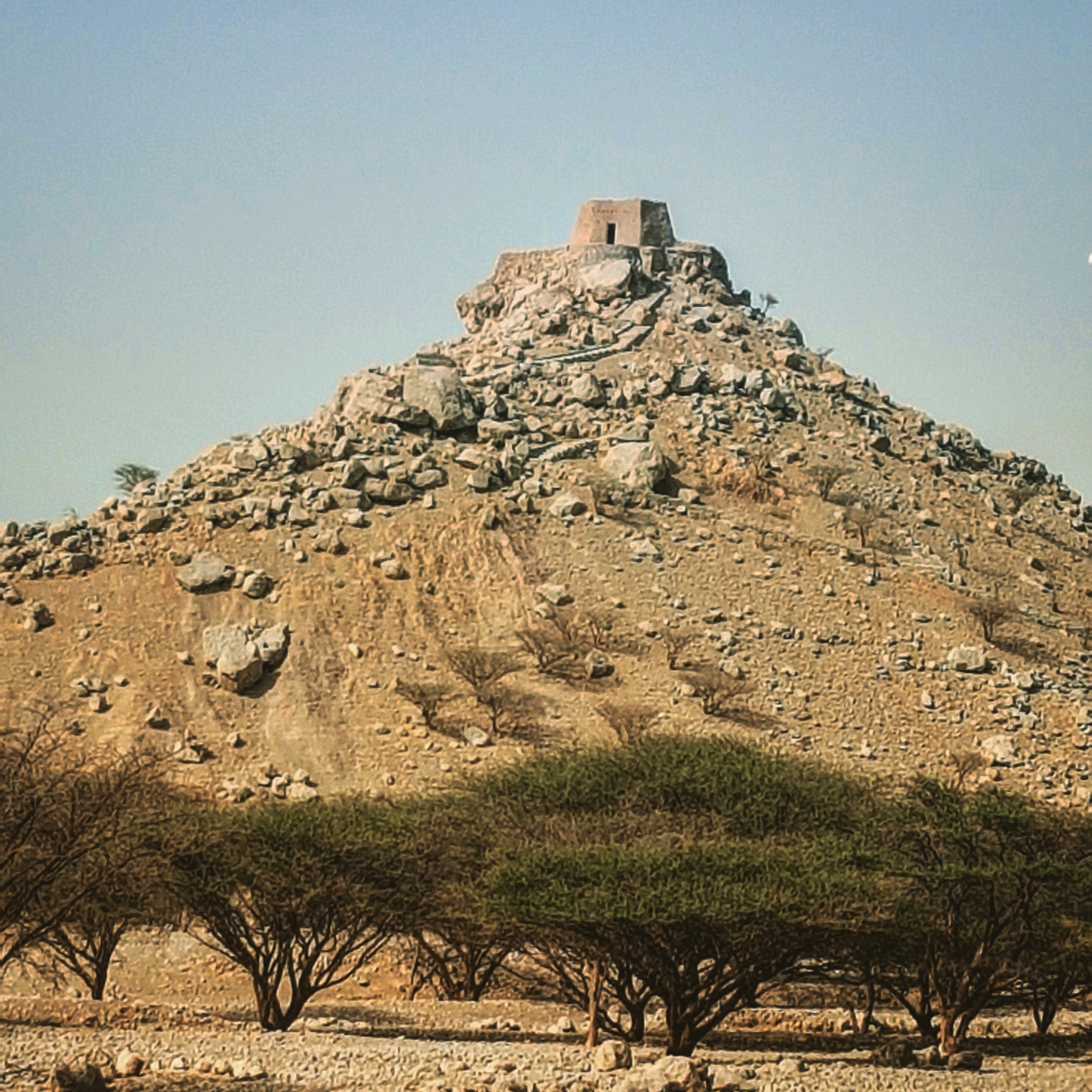
The hilltop fort of Dhayah, in Ras Al Khaimah, UAE.

The British landed a force on 18 December, which made its way inland through date plantations to Dhayah Fort on the 19th. There, 400 people held out, without sanitation, water or effective cover from the sun, for three days under heavy fire from mortars and 12-pound cannon.

The two 24-pound cannon from HMS Liverpool which had been used to bombard Ras Al Khaimah from the landward side were once again pressed into use and dragged across the plain from the coastal mangrove swamps of Rams, a journey of some four miles. Each of the guns weighed over two tonnes. After enduring two hours of sustained fire from the big guns, which breached the fort's walls, the last of the Al Qasimi surrendered at 10.30 on the morning of 22 December.

Many of the people in the fort were herders and farmers from the Tunaij tribe who had fled there on the arrival of the British and of the 400 people who surrendered, only 177 were identified as fighting men. The British flag was briefly flown from the fort before it was blown up. British losses from the action at Dhayah included one officer and three men killed and sixteen wounded.

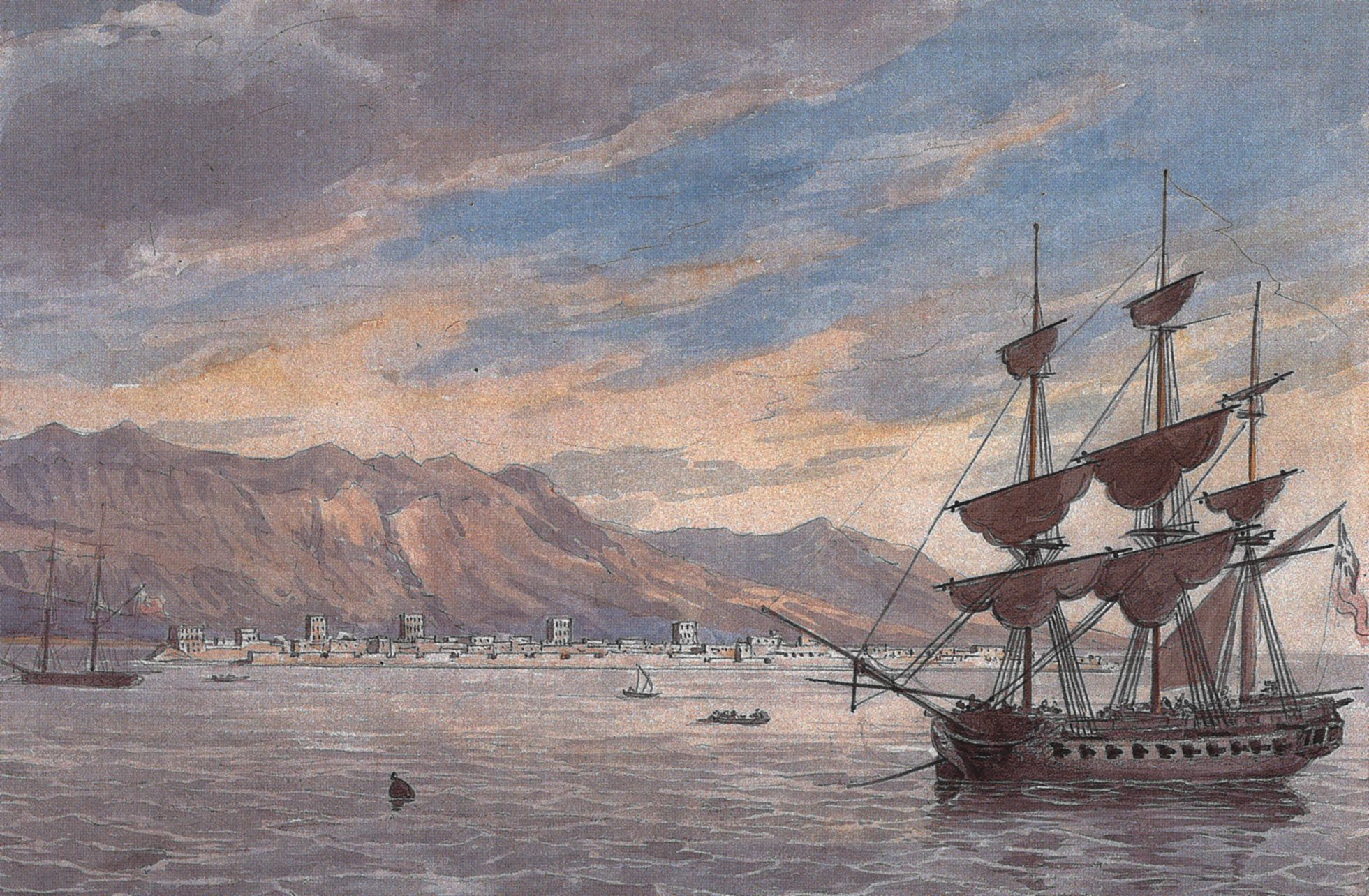
The town of Rus al Khyma, sketched by Charles Hamilton Smith

The British expeditionary force then blew up the town of Ras Al Khaimah and established a garrison there of 800 sepoys and artillery, before visiting Jazirat Al Hamra, which was found to be deserted. They went on to destroy the fortifications and larger vessels of Umm Al Qawain, Ajman, Fasht, Sharjah, Abu Hail, and Dubai. Ten vessels that had taken shelter in Bahrain were also destroyed. The Royal Navy suffered no casualties during the action.

During the campaign, the town of Lengeh, held by a branch of Qawasim sheikhs, was attacked by the Bombay Marines and burnt to the ground.

== Treaty and aftermath ==
With the Sheikhs of these communities either in captivity or choosing to give themselves up, a treaty was proposed in order to govern peaceful relationships in the future, the General Treaty of Maritime Peace of 1820. The treaty opens, 'In the name of God, the merciful, the compassionate! Praise be to God, who hath ordained peace to be a blessing to his creatures.'

Under the auspices of the UK's representative Sir William Keir Grant, the treaty prohibited piracy in the Persian Gulf, banned slavery and required all usable ships to be registered with British forces by flying distinctive red and white flags which exist today as the flags of the respective emirates.

Despite the 1820 treaty, the British were nonetheless distrustful of Arab shipping. In 1820, several Arab boats were confiscated by Captain Loch and ordered to proceed towards Ras Al Khaimah. The Lengeh boats managed to escape back to their port, but others, such as those from Charak, were unsuccessful and were destroyed. The governor of Fars launched a complaint, as those from Lengeh were Persian subjects, and declared the EIC resident persona ingrata.

The treaty was signed by the Sheikhs of Khatt and Falaya; Jazirah Al Hamra; Abu Dhabi, Rams and Dhayah, Dubai, Sharjah, Ajman, and Umm Al Quwain. It was to lead to a permanent peace and an era of unprecedented prosperity, as well as establishing thriving coastal trading communities, some of which would grow to become global cities.

== See also ==
- Persian Gulf campaign of 1809
- General Maritime Treaty of 1820
