= Zaab =

Bedouin tribe of the United Arab Emirates

Za'ab زعاب
- Arab tribe
- Ethnicity: Arab
- Location: United Arab Emirates (Ras Al Khaimah, Sharjah, Abu Dhabi); Oman
- Language: Arabic
- Religion: Islam
- Surnames: Al-Zaabi

The Za'ab (Arabic: زعاب) (singular Za'abi Arabic: الزعابي) is an Arab tribe of the Arabian Peninsula, principally in the United Arab Emirates and Northern Oman.

The Zaab originally settled the coastal village of Jazirat Al Hamra, where at the turn of the 20th century they had established some 500 houses. They also settled in Kalba, where some 150 families resided, and maintained date palms in the inland village of Khatt on the Jiri plain, where they would decamp to avoid the humidity and heat of the coast during the summer date harvest. At the time, the tribe was some 3,300 strong.

The Sheikh of Jazirat Al Hamra in 1820, Rajib bin Ahmed Al Zaabi, was one of four independent signatories to the original 1820 treaty between the Trucial States and the British, following the 1819 punitive expedition mounted against Ras Al Khaimah by the British. In the treaty, the sheikhdom was named as 'Jourat Al Kamra'. By the time of the Perpetual Maritime Truce of 4 May 1853, Jazirat Al Hamra had become part of Ras Al Khaimah and the treaty was signed by Sheikh Sultan bin Saqr Al Qasimi as 'Chief of the Joasmees', to whom the Zaab had become dependents.

Jazirat Al Hamra has also been called Jazirah Al Zaab, after the tribe. A tidal island, it was split into two sections, the small northern quarter of Umm Awaimir and the southern Manakh. Although the Zaab had some 500 sheep and 150 cattle at the time, there were no palm groves, although the tribe tended a number of groves at Khatt (J. G. Lorimer notes there were some 20,000 trees around the village). The Zaab maintained a fleet of some 25 pearling boats at Jazirat Al Hamrah, the principal source of income for the tribe until the crash of the pearl market in the late 1920s.

Following an agreement between Sheikh Khalid bin Ahmad Al Qasimi of Sharjah and Sheikh Sultan bin Salim Al Qasimi of Ras Al Khaimah in 1914, the town became part of Ras Al Khaimah, but was often in dispute with the Ruler. This led, in 1968, to a dispute with Sheikh Saqr bin Mohammed Al Qasimi of Ras Al Khaimah, which resulted in the majority of the tribe accepting an offer from Sheikh Zayed bin Sultan Al Nahyan to move to Abu Dhabi. This movement left behind an almost completely abandoned village which had housed some 2,500 people.

As a result of this movement, the tribe gives its name to an area in Abu Dhabi, Al Zaab.

== People ==
- Tahnoon Al-Zaabi — Emirati footballer
- Saud Al-Zaabi — Emirati runner
- Ismail Al-Zaabi — Emirati footballer
- Abdulla Al-Zaabi — Emirati football referee
- Yousif Al-Zaabi — Emirati footballer
- Mohannad Al-Zaabi — Omani footballer
