= Dhayah Fort =

- Location within United Arab Emirates
- Coordinates: 25.884351081839153°N 56.06054496104987°E
- Country: United Arab Emirates
- Emirate: Ras Al Khaimah

Dhayah Fort (Arabic: قلعة ضاية) is an 18th-century fortification in Ras Al Khaimah, United Arab Emirates (UAE). It is the highest hilltop fort in the UAE and was the site of a battle during the Persian Gulf campaign of 1819, when British troops captured the fort after a brief siege.

The fall of Dhayah was to pave the way for the signing of the General Maritime Treaty of 1820, the first of a number of treaties between the British government and the Sheikhs, or rulers, of what would become known as the Trucial Coast.

== History ==
The fort was the last outpost of Qawasim resistance to British forces in 1819, when a punitive expedition was sent from Bombay to quell the troublesome seafaring tribe, who had committed 'piracy and plunder' according to the British.

Ras Al Khaimah fell to the British force on 9 December 1819. Following this, three ships were sent to blockade the nearby village of Rams to the North. They landed a force on 18 December, which fought its way inland through date plantations to the hilltop fort of Dhayah on the 19th. There, 400 people held out, without sanitation, water, or effective cover from the sun, for three days under heavy fire from mortars and 12-pound cannon.

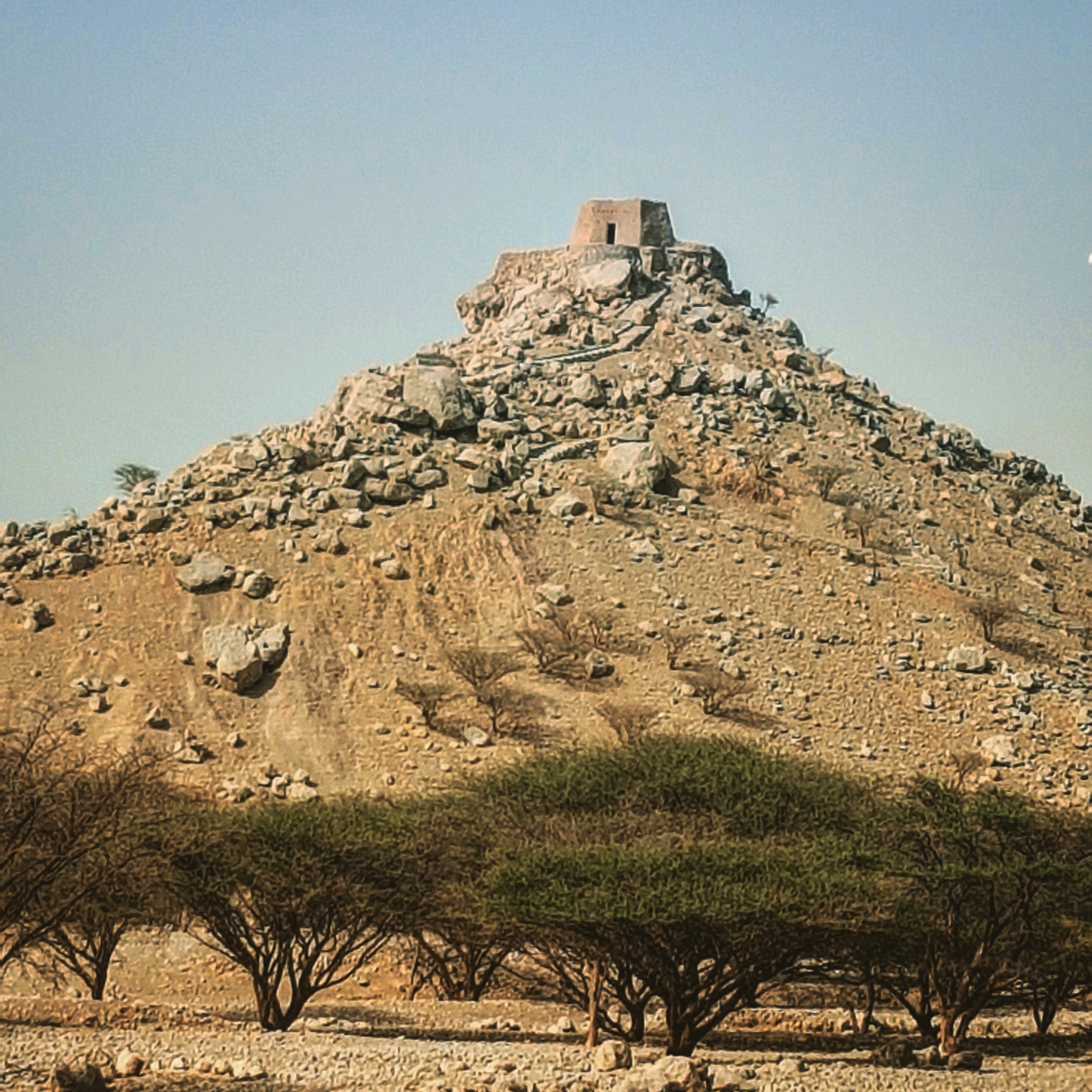
The hilltop fort of Dhayah, in Ras Al Khaimah, UAE.

The two 24-pound cannons from HMS Liverpool, which had been used to bombard Ras Al Khaimah town from the landward side, were once again pressed into use and dragged across the plain from the coast at Rams, a journey of some four miles. Each of the guns weighed over 2 tonnes. After enduring two hours of sustained fire from the big guns, which breached the fort's walls, the last of the Al Qasimi surrendered at 10.30 on the morning of 22 December.

Many of the people in the fort were herders and farmers from the date groves of Dhayah, and the majority were members of the Tunaij tribe who had fled there on the arrival of the British, and of the 400 people who surrendered, only 177 were identified as men of fighting age. The British flag was briefly flown from the fort before it was demolished. British losses from the action at Dhayah included 1 officer and 3 men killed and 16 wounded.

The British expeditionary force then blew up the town of Ras Al Khaimah and established a garrison there of 800 sepoys and artillery, before visiting Jazirat Al Hamra, which was found to be deserted. They went on to destroy the fortifications and larger vessels of Umm Al Qawain, Ajman, Fasht, Sharjah, Abu Hail, and Dubai. Ten vessels that had taken shelter in Bahrain were also destroyed. The Royal Navy suffered no casualties during the action.

The Sheikh of Rams and Al Dhaya (named in the treaty as the 'Sheikh of Zyah'), Hassan bin Ali, was a co-signatory of the General Maritime Treaty of 1820, which established peace following the cessation of hostilities. That treaty between the British and the Sheikhs of what was formerly known as the Pirate Coast and what would become known as the Trucial Coast led to the establishment of what is known today as the United Arab Emirates (UAE).

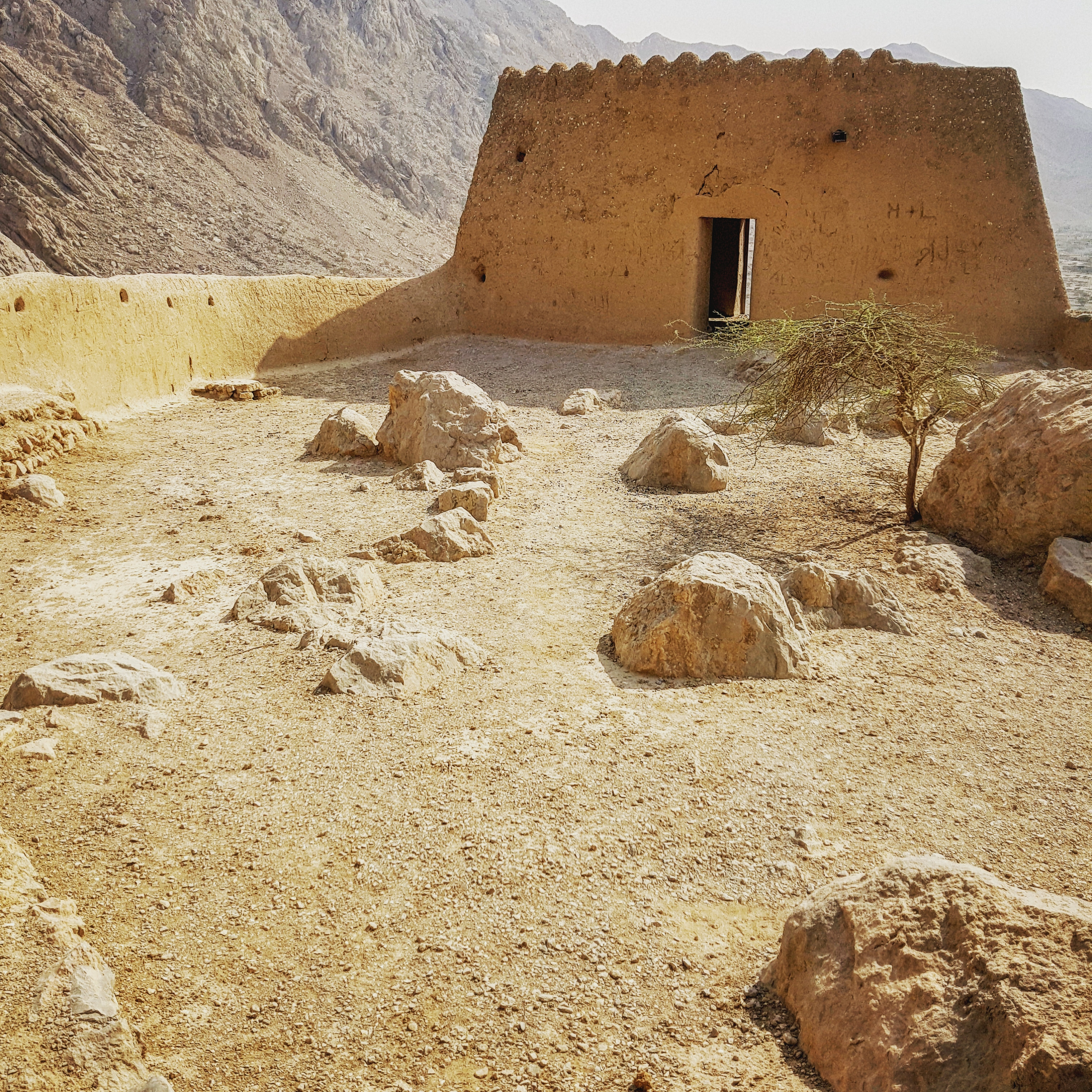
The ground area of Dhayah Fort. Two small buildings stand at either end.

=== Further fortifications ===
A larger fortification constructed from mud bricks sits at the foot of the hill. This 'Sur' was used as a retreat for local people. A third element of fortification at Dhayah are watchtowers in the palm groves. Between the three fortifications, the area was rendered secure against interference from other Arab states, although the aged fortifications proved no match for the heavy artillery of the Royal Navy.

The fort is unusual in that it is the highest hilltop fort (as opposed to tower or lookout post) in the UAE. It commands 360-degree views of the surrounding lush landscape of wadis and plains. Remains in the area to the base of the hill at Dhayah show the area was inhabited as far back as the Wadi Suq period.

Dhayah fort, as it stands today, was rebuilt after 1819 and restored in the 1990s. A relatively small fortification, it lacks a natural source of water. By the time of J. G. Lorimer's survey of 1906, the area of Dhayah was uninhabited.

=== See also ===
- United Arab Emirates § History
