= Al Fahlain =

- Location within United Arab Emirates
- Coordinates: 25°41′3″N 55°58′0″E
- Country: United Arab Emirates
- Emirate: Ras Al Khaimah
- Elevation: 18 m (59 ft)

Al Fahlain is the name of a settlement in the emirate of Ras Al Khaimah, traditionally mostly settled by members of the Naqbiyin tribe.

== History ==
Together with the village of Khatt, adjacent to the south, the village of Fahlain formed part of the Sheikhdom of the 19th century Al Qasimi ruler of Ras Al Khaimah, Hassan bin Rahmah who signed the General Maritime Treaty of 1820 with the British.

In the 1819 expedition from Bombay, British forces sacked Ras Al Khaimah and Hassan Bin Rahmah signed a preliminary agreement to cede Ras Al Khaimah town, which became the British garrison. He signed the 1820 treaty as "Sheikh of Hatt and Falna, formerly of Ras Al Khaimah". Hatt is modern Khatt, while Falna is Fahlain.

The mosque at Fahlain has been compared to that of Al Badiyah and is said to be the oldest in Ras Al Khaimah. Contemporary accounts date it to before the 18th Century. In 1903, Lorimer noted the village consisted of 60 Naqbiyin houses and 2,000 date palms.
