= Rams (Ras Al Khaimah) =

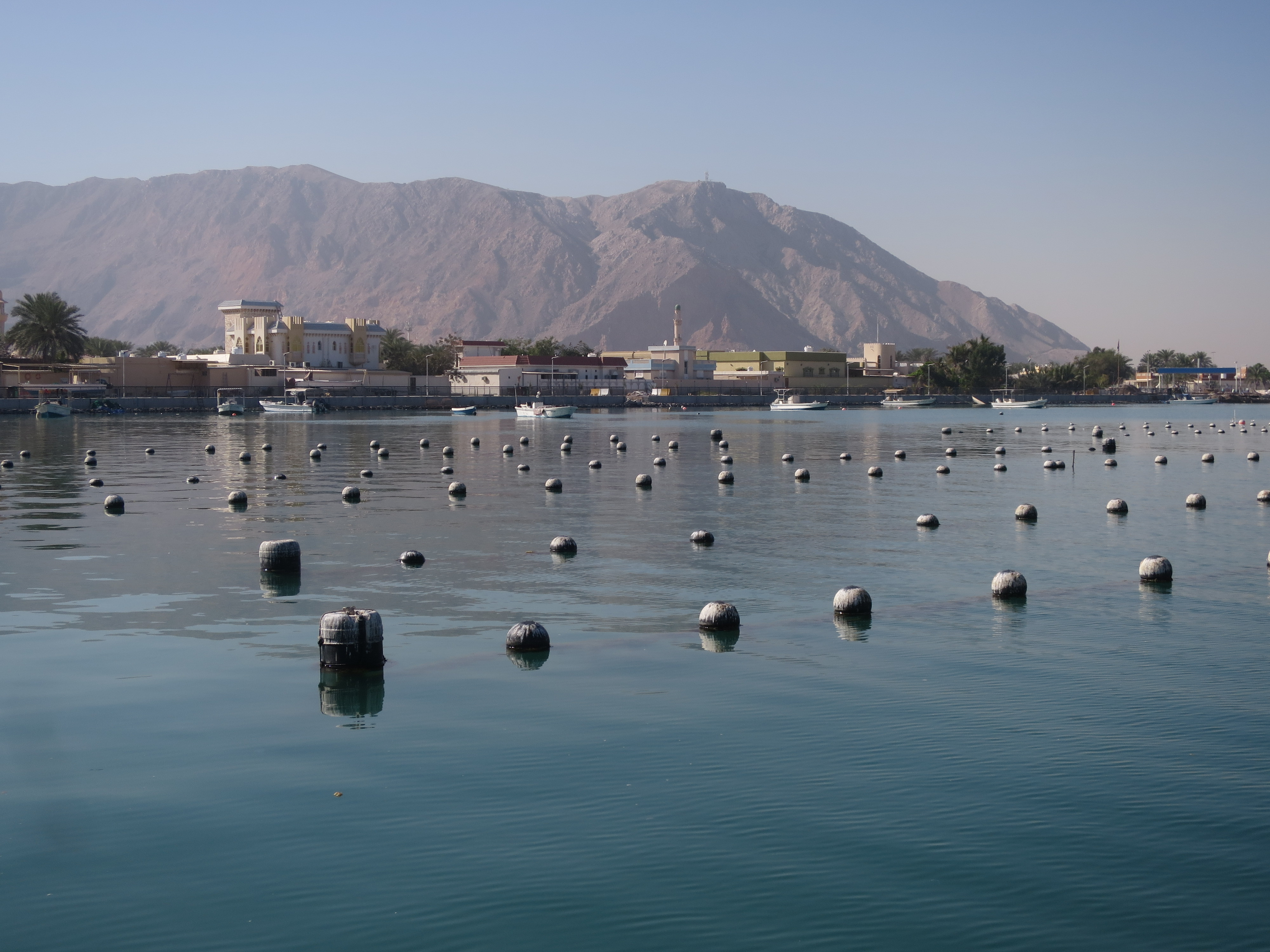
- Suwaidi pearl farm

- Location within United Arab Emirates
- Coordinates: 25°52′44″N 56°1′25″E
- Country: United Arab Emirates
- Emirate: Ras Al Khaimah

Area
  - Total: 8 km^{2} (3.1 sq mi)
- Elevation: 144 m (472 ft)

Population
  - Total: 13,000

Rams is a suburb of Ras Al Khaimah in the United Arab Emirates (UAE). Once a pearl diving and fishing community that frequently disputed the rule of Ras Al Khaimah, today it forms the northern coastal settlement of the city.

== History ==
Detail of Al Rams (labelled Raumps), its coastal tower, and Dhayah (Zyah Hill) from the 1821 Bombay Marine nautical chart surveyed by Philip Maughan and drawn by Michael Houghton, illustrating the coastal settlement and inland approach associated with the 1819–1820 British campaign.

A coastal community, Rams' hinterland consists of palm groves and the fort of Dhayah. It was at Rams that the British punitive expedition landed in 1819, following the sack of Ras Al Khaimah. The British fought their way inland to Dhayah, where they encountered spirited resistance, finally taking the surrender of almost 800 men, women and children after surrounding and bombarding the fort for some three days. The General Maritime Treaty of 1820 was signed by Hassan bin Ali, 'Sheikh of Zyah' who was, in fact, the Sheikh of Rams and Dhayah. In an 1821 Bombay Marine nautical chart surveyed by Philip Maughan and drawn by Michael Houghton, the settlement is recorded as "Raumps" with a large coastal tower, offshore soundings, and a creek route extending inland toward Dhayah ("Zyah Hill").

Rams was traditionally home to the Tunaij tribe; all 400 houses there were settled by the early 19th century by that tribe. Almost a hundred years later, the village had a single shop, kept by a Persian gentleman, and some 7,000 date palms. The inland area of Dhayah was by then uninhabited, having been sacked by the British in 1819.

They mostly relied on pearl fishing, with a fleet of 3 pearl boats and 10 fishing boats. The Tunaij of Rams would frequently hire members of the mountain Shihuh tribe for pearling expeditions. Themselves desiring independence, Rams' community frequently came into conflict with the Rulers of Ras Al Khaimah.

It has a long, 1.6 km beach, which has in recent years witnessed some ecological disasters, including a mass death event where thousands of dead fish, thought to be sardines, were washed up on the beach in May 2018. Earlier in the year, a 9-meter whale was washed up.

With its long history of pearl fishing, many of the older buildings in Rams (constructed from wood, coral, and local materials) are being considered for redevelopment.

== Nature ==
Thousands of blue blubber jellyfish washed up along the shores of Rams in March and April 2019, which was unusual for this time of the year. Fishermen had to net the jellyfish as they disrupted their work.
