= William Keir Grant =

British Army general

General Sir William Keir Grant GCH KCB
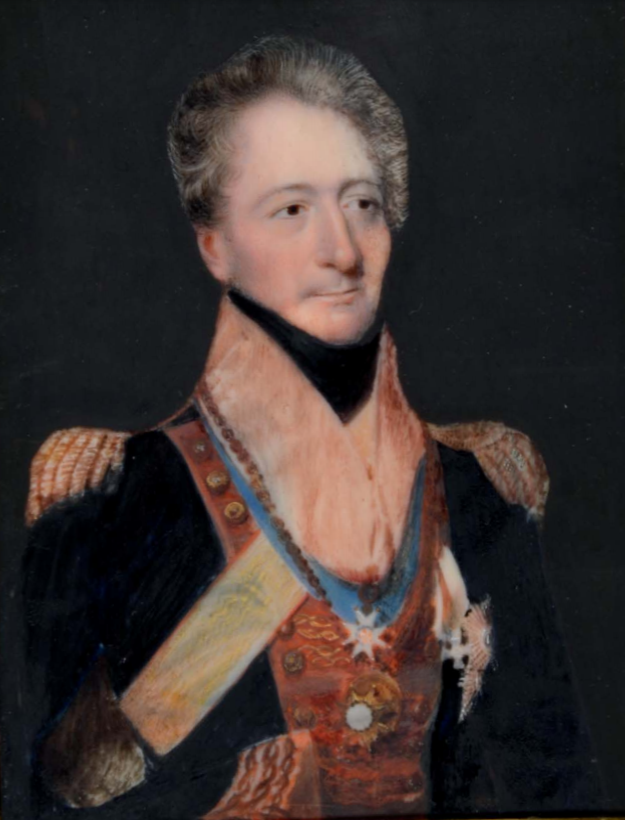
- Born: William Keir; 25 May 1771; Fife, Scotland
- Died: 7 May 1852 (aged 80) Belgrave Square, London, England

General Sir William Keir Grant GCH KCB (born William Grant Keir; 25 May 1771 – 7 May 1852) was a British Army general during the first half of the 19th century.

He was born in Fife, Scotland, the son of Archibald Keir of the East India Company and joined the British Army as a cornet in the 15th (The King's) Light Dragoons. He was promoted lieutenant in 1793, and accompanied part of his regiment to Flanders, where he fought at Famars, Valenciennes, and elsewhere in the campaigns of 1793–1794. He was present at the Villers-en-Cauchies on 24 April 1794, when two squadrons of the 15th and two of the Austrian Leopold Hussars, although finding themselves unexpectedly without infantry support, overthrew a much superior force of French cavalry, pursued them through the French infantry, and captured three guns. The action saved the Emperor of Germany, who was on his way to Coblenz, from being taken by the French. Keir and seven other officers were awarded a large gold medal by Francis II. Only nine of these medals were struck, one being given to each of the eight British officers present, and the ninth placed in the Imperial Museum, Vienna. The officers were also made knights of the Military Order of Maria Theresa, which, as in the case of other foreign orders of chivalry previous to 1814, carried the rank of a knight-bachelor in England and other countries. It also gave the recipient the rank of baron in Austria.

He was then promoted to a troop in the 6th Regiment of Dragoon Guards, with which he served in Germany in 1795 and Ireland in 1798. In the latter year, Grant received permission from King George III to wear the gold medal given by Francis II in commemoration of the action at Villers-en-Cauchies.

Grant joined the Russian and Austrian armies in Italy early in 1799, and served in the campaigns of 1799, 1800 and 1801. He was present at the battles of Novi, Rivoli, Mondovi, and Sanliano. He also served in the gunboats at the siege of Genoa and in several actions in the mountains of Genoa, when the Austrians and Russians lost nearly thirty-three thousand men. He was also at the Battle of Marengo and the sieges of Alessandria, Sanaval, Tortona, Cunio and Savona.

On 3 December 1800, he was appointed lieutenant-colonel in the 22nd Light Dragoons, with which corps he landed in Egypt after the cessation of hostilities in 1801. The regiment was disbanded on the Peace of Amiens, and Grant was placed on half pay.

For a short time he was aide-de-camp to the Prince of Wales, and afterwards first aide-de-camp to Lord Moira, before being appointed adjutant-general of the king's troops in Bengal, where he commanded the advance of Major General St. Leger's force on the Sutlej in 1810. Subsequently, while on the Bengal Staff, Grant, who became colonel in 1810 and a major general in 1813, was appointed to command a small force of cavalry and grenadiers sent against Ameer (Amir) Khan (afterwards the Nawab of Tonk) in 1814. In 1815, he was made commander-in-chief and second member of council on the island of Java, a position he held until the island was restored to the Dutch after the peace.

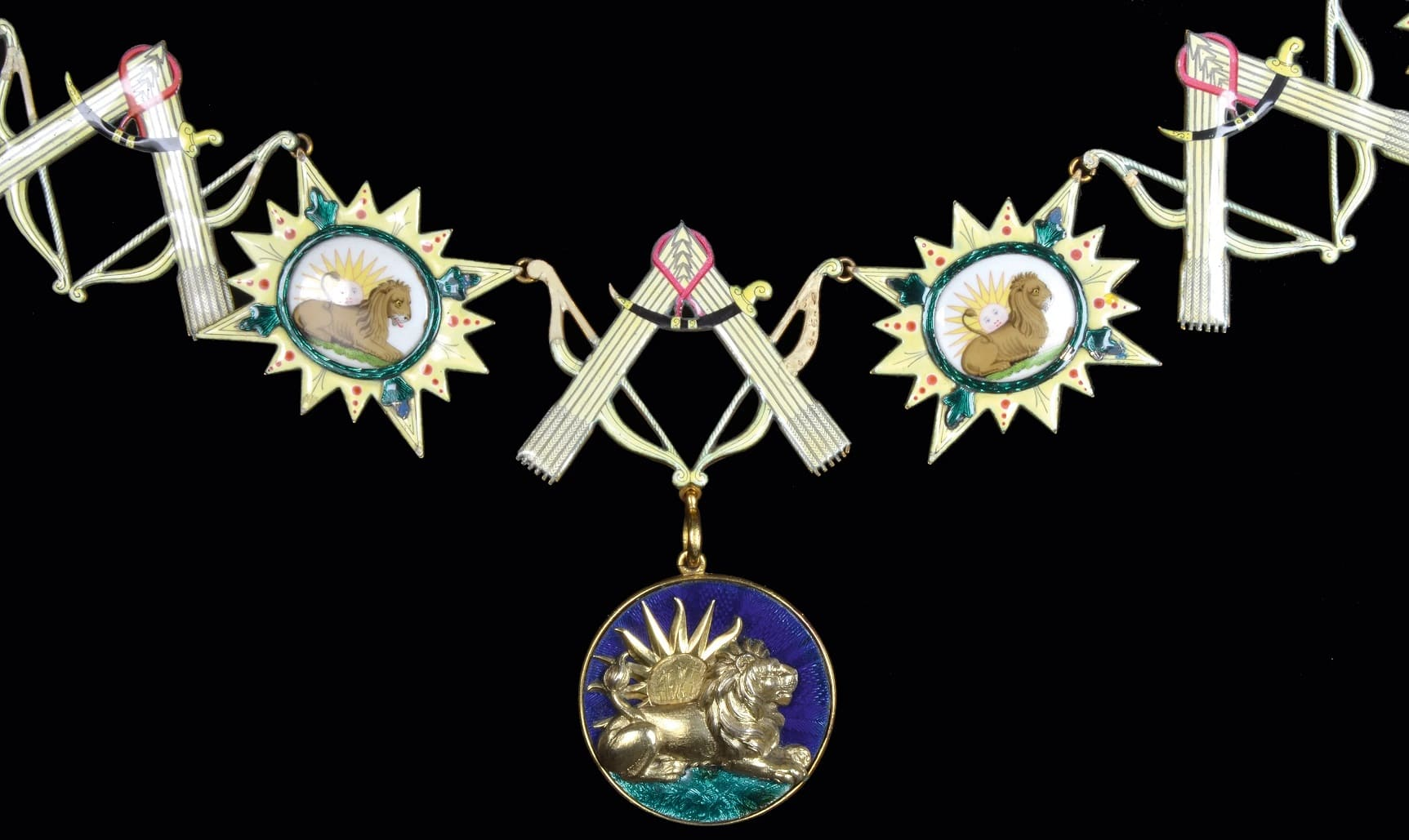
Collar of the Order of the Lion and Sun of General Sir William Keir Grant

In 1817, he was appointed to the Bombay Staff and commanded the Gujarat field force, part of the army of the Deccan, in the operations against the Pindaris. In February 1819, he was in command of a force assembled on the frontier of the Sawunt Warree state. The latter proving intractable the troops entered the country, carried the strong hill fort of Raree by storm and marched to the capital, where a treaty was signed with the regency. In March the same year, he commanded a force sent against the Rajah of Cutch, which, after defeating the enemy and capturing the hill fortress of Bhooj, received the submission of that province.

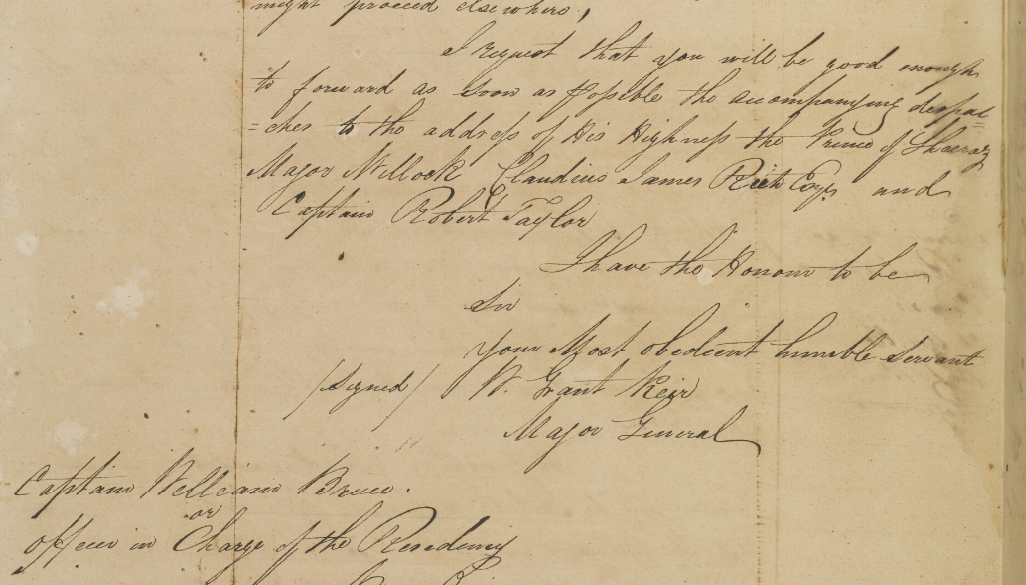
Signature of William Grant Keir on a letter to William Bruce, British Resident at Bushire

In October 1819, Grant was despatched by the Bombay government with a strong armament for the suppression of piracy in the Persian Gulf. The attack was specially directed against the Joasmi (Al Qasimi), a tribe of maritime Arabs of the sect of Wahhabis or followers of the Arab religious reformer, Abd-ul-Wahab (Bestower of Blessings), whose pirate craft had long been the terror of the coasts of western India. Ras Al Khaimah, their stronghold, had been destroyed by a small force from Bombay in 1809, but their power was again in the ascendant. Ras Al Khaimah was captured with small loss on 9 December 1819. On 8 January 1820, Grant signed a general treaty of peace on the part of the British government with the chiefs of the tribes of maritime Arabs of the Persian Gulf, by whom it was subsequently signed at different times and places. It provided for the entire suppression of piracy in the Gulf. For his services Grant received the thanks of the governor-general in council and the Persian decoration of the Lion and Sun.

He returned home at the end of his staff service and was made KCB in 1822, lieutenant-general in 1825, GCH in 1835 and given the colonelcy in 1833 of the 8th Light Dragoons and in 1839 of the 2nd (Royal North British) Regiment of Dragoons (later the Scots Greys), an honour he held until his death in 1852. He was promoted to full general on 23 November 1841.

He died at his home in Chapel Street, Belgrave Square, London, aged 80. He had married in 1811 a daughter of Captain Jackson, R.N.

Military offices
| Preceded by Sir James Steuart Denham | Colonel of the 2nd (Royal North British) Regiment of Dragoons; 1839–1852 | Succeeded by Archibald Money |
