= Flotilla Service Act of 1814 =

U.S. federal statute

- Long title: An Act authorizing the appointment of certain officers for the flotilla service.
- Enacted by: the 13th United States Congress
- Effective: April 16, 1814

Citations
- Public law: Pub. L. 13–59
- Statutes at Large: 3 Stat. 125, Chap. 59

Codification
- Acts repealed: P.L. 13-62, 3 Stat. 217, Chap.62

Legislative history
- Introduced in the Senate as S. 52; Passed the Senate on April 7, 1814 (11-16); Signed into law by President James Madison on April 16, 1814

Flotilla Service Act was a United States federal statute passed on April 16, 1814 preceding the British Royal Navy blockade of the New England Colonies commencing on April 25, 1814. The public law established a temporary Mid-Atlantic naval auxiliary service for amphibious operations orchestrated by the Chesapeake Colonies during the War of 1812. The Chesapeake Bay Flotilla conducted amphibious maneuvers in low-level tidal creeks seeking to deter the territorial headway of the British Royal Navy offensive into the Chesapeake Bay tributaries. The Act of Congress authorized appropriations for the federal law in response to the foreseeable onslaught by the British Army redcoats arson offensive on August 24, 1814 at Washington City better known as the Burning of Washington.

== Provisions of the Act ==
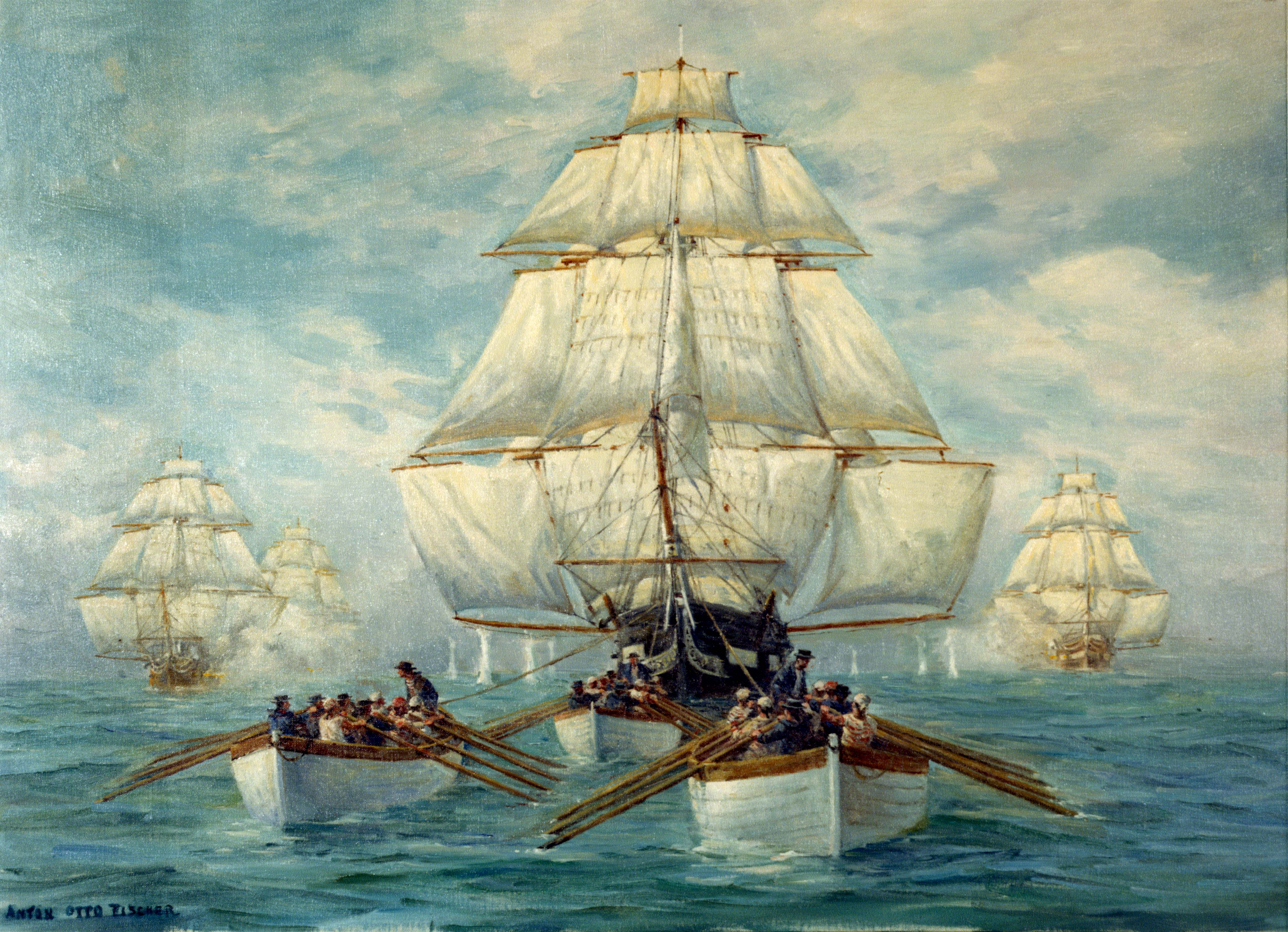
British Royal Navy in pursuit of USS Constitution July 1812

The Thirteenth United States Congress drafted public law 13-59 as three sections providing a manpower formulation which coincided with the military objectives discharged by the Colonial American counter-offensive naval flotilla forces.

Chapter LIX § 1: Appointment of Flotilla Officers

- Four captains
- Twelve lieutenants
- Officers employed in the flotilla service of the United States, without rank in the Navy, but with the same relative rank and authority in the flotilla service as officers of the same grade are entitled to in the Navy of the United States.

Chapter LIX § 2: Pay and Emoluments

- Captains shall receive the pay and subsistence of a captain in the Navy commanding a ship of twenty and under thirty-two guns.
- Lieutenants shall receive the same pay as officers of the same rank are entitled to in the Navy of the United States, and shall be governed by the rules and regulations provided for the government of the Navy.

Chapter LIX § 3: Authorization of Presidential Appointments

- It shall be lawful for the President of the United States to appoint, in the recess of the Senate, any of the officers authorized by this act, which appointments shall be submitted to the Senate at their next session.

== Abolishment of the Flotilla Service Act ==
On the tenth day after the ratification of the Treaty of Ghent, Flotilla Service Act of 1814 was repealed by the United States 13th Congressional session occurring on February 27, 1815.

== See also ==
| Battle of Baltimore | Origins of the War of 1812 |
| Joshua Barney | Star-Spangled Banner National Historic Trail |
| Loyalist of the American Revolution | USS Scorpion (1812) |

British Royal Military Commanders During the 1814 Washington Offensive

| Alexander Cochrane | Robert Ross |
| George Cockburn | James Scott |
| George de Lacy Evans | Harry Smith |
| James Gordon | John Wainwright |

Chesapeake Bay River Tributaries

| Anacostia River | Patuxent River |
| Patapsco River | Potomac River |

== Associated United States Statutes ==
U.S. Laws Related to Coastal Conflict During War of 1812

| Date of Enactment | Public Law No. | U.S. Statute Citation | U.S. Bill No. | U.S. Presidential Administration |
|---|---|---|---|---|
| July 5, 1813 | P.L. 13-6 | 3 Stat. 3 | Chapter VI | James Madison |
| March 9, 1814 | P.L. 13-21 | 3 Stat. 104 | Chapter XXI | James Madison |
| November 15, 1814 | P.L. 13-3 | 3 Stat. 144 | Chapter III | James Madison |
| December 7, 1999 | P.L. 106-135 | 113 Stat. 1685 | H.R. 791 | William J. Clinton |

== Reading Bibliography ==
- Barney, Mary (1832). "Biographical Memoir of the Late Commodore Joshua Barney". Google Books. Boston, Massachusetts: Gray and Bowen. OCLC 2577741.
- Barney, Mary (1832). "Biographical Memoir of the Late Commodore Joshua Barney". Internet Archive. Boston, Massachusetts: Gray and Bowen. OCLC 2577741.
- Shomette, Donald (1981). "Flotilla: Battle for the Patuxent". Google Books. Solomons, Maryland: Calvert Marine Museum Press. OCLC 7967914.
- Shomette, Donald; Hopkins, Jr., Fred W. (2009). "Flotilla: The Patuxent Naval Campaign in the War of 1812". Google Books. Johns Hopkins Books on the War of 1812. Baltimore, Maryland: Johns Hopkins University Press. ISBN 978-0801891229. OCLC 966582548.
- Eshelman, Ralph E.; Sheads, Scott S.; Hickey, Donald R. (2010). "The War of 1812 in the Chesapeake: A Reference Guide to Historic Sites in Maryland, Virginia, and the District of Columbia". Google Books. Johns Hopkins books on the War of 1812. Baltimore, Maryland: Johns Hopkins University Press. ISBN 978-0801892356. OCLC 260254246.
- Quick, Stanley L.; Reid, Chipp (2015). "Lion in the Bay: The British Invasion of the Chesapeake, 1813-14". Google Books. Annapolis, Maryland: Naval Institute Press. ISBN 978-1612512372. OCLC 908374258.
- Neimeyer, Charles Patrick (2015). "War in the Chesapeake: The British Campaigns to Control the Bay, 1813-1814". Google Books. Annapolis, Maryland: Naval Institute Press. ISBN 978-1612518664. OCLC 931799215.
