= Henry Carroll (lawyer) =

American lawyer

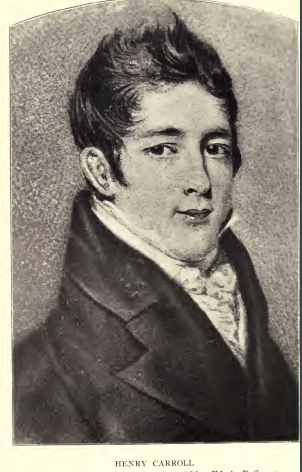
- Born: c. 1792; Hagerstown, Maryland
- Died: February 29, 1820 (aged 27-28); Franklin, Missouri
- Occupation: Lawyer
- Known for: Delivering the Treaty of Ghent to President James Madison
- Notable work: Missouri Territory Public Lands Registrar; Secretary to Congressman Henry Clay

Henry Carroll (c. 1792 – February 29, 1820) was an American lawyer and who served as secretary to Congressman Henry Clay and as a member of the Treaty of Ghent Peace Commission.

== Early and family life ==
Born around 1792 in Maryland, Henry Carroll was the eldest of eight children of Charles Carroll of Bellevue (1767–1823) and his wife, the former Ann Sprigg (1769–1837). The Carroll family was one of the most powerful in Maryland, descended from Charles Carroll the Settler (1660–1720), the great-grandfather of Charles Carroll of Duddington (1729–1773), this man's grandfather. Although his great grandfather, Daniel Carroll of Duddington (1707–1734) owned the land that eventually became Capitol Hill in the District of Columbia, by this time the family operated plantations near Hagerstown in Washington County, Maryland. His brother Charles H. Carroll (1794–1865) would become a prominent politician in New York, and U.S. Congressman. Another brother, William Thomas Carroll (1831–1863) served as the 5th Clerk of the United States Supreme Court, and their sister Elizabeth Barbara Carroll (1806–1866) married Henry Fitzhugh who also became a politician in New York.

Other early distinguished members of the Carroll family were descended from Charles the settler's elder son, Charles Carroll of Annapolis, including Charles Carroll the Barrister, and Charles Carroll of Carrollton who signed the Declaration of Independence for the Colony of Maryland in 1776.

== Carroll of Bellevue and Dumbarton House ==
In 1814, Charles Carroll of Bellevue was proprietor of the Dumbarton House which offered a contingency plan for Dolley Madison during the August 23, 1814, flight from the White House prior to the onslaught of the British Army redcoats and the Burning of Washington.

== Diplomatic service and Treaty of Ghent ==
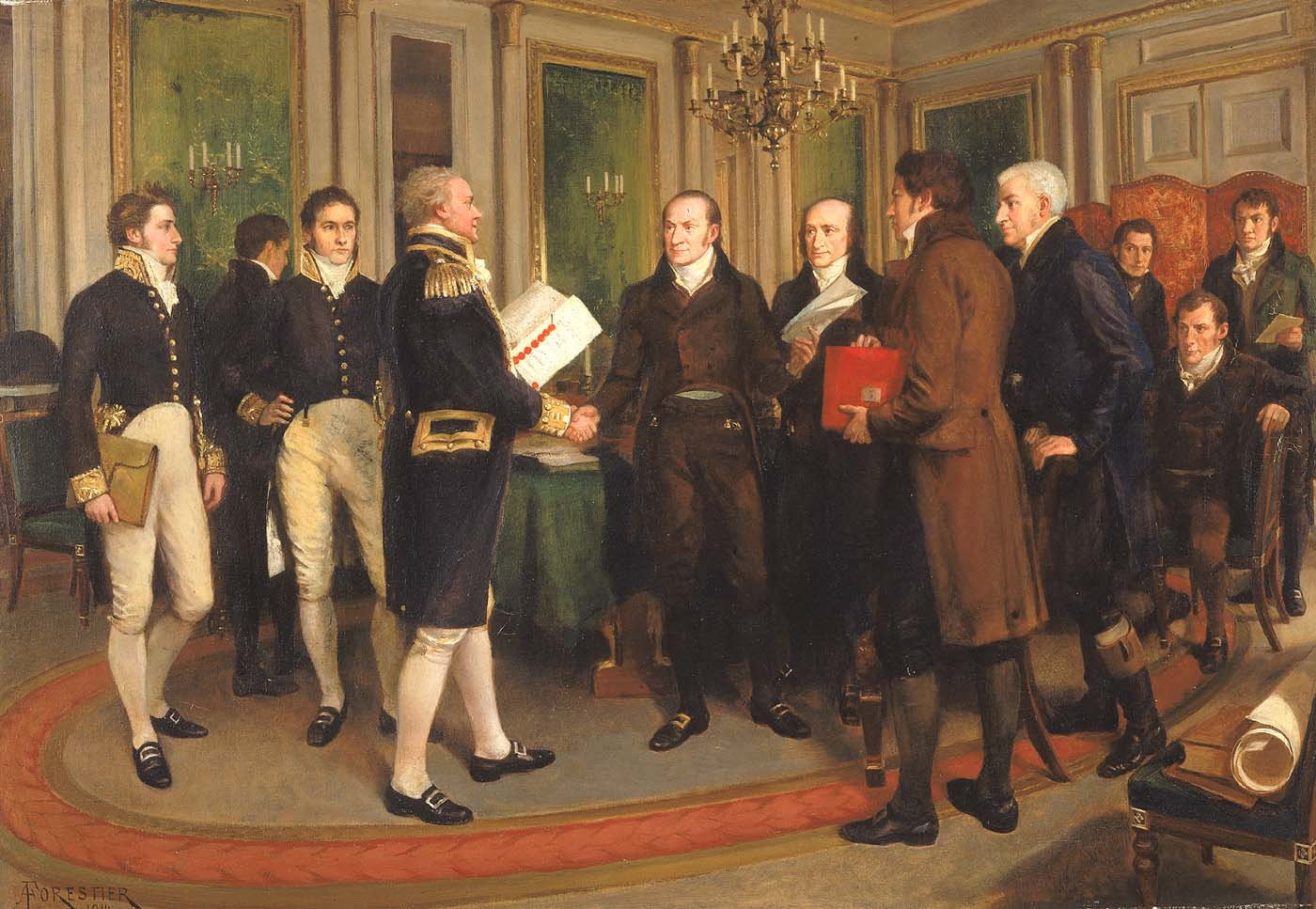
Signing of Treaty of Ghent on December 24, 1814

From August 1814 to December 24, 1814, Henry Carroll accompanied a peace commission from the United States to Ghent, Belgium for negotiations concerning the Treaty of Ghent seeking a cessation to the War of 1812. Henry was appointed courier for the delivery of the peace treaty to James Madison for ratification by the United States government. On January 2, 1815, Anthony St. John Baker and Henry Carroll embarked the British sloop ship HMS Favorite sailing under a flag of truce to the United States with a distant anchoring at Sandy Hook peninsula on February 11, 1815. After his arrival in Lower New York Bay, Henry boarded a post chaise granting an arrival in Washington City on February 14, 1815. The treaty was delivered to President Madison at a temporary Executive Mansion better known as The Octagon House. President Madison presented the Treaty of Ghent to the United States Senate on February 16, 1815, where the peace treaty was unanimously approved ending British impressment and the War of 1812.

== Killing of Henry Carroll ==
In 1820, Henry Carroll resided in the Missouri Territory near Franklin, Missouri, serving as a federal registrar of public lands for the organized territory concurrently to the Missouri Compromise. Henry Carroll had a dispute with Richard Gentry concerning his governance of land patents and territorial revenue, which led to Gentry shooting and killing Carroll on February 29, 1820.

== See also ==
Jacob Barker	Paul Jennings
Burning of Washington	Lansdowne Portrait
Chesapeake Bay Flotilla	Josiah Meigs
Flotilla Service Act of 1814	Jean Pierre Sioussat

American Peace Treaty Commission at Ghent, United Netherlands

John Quincy Adams	Albert Gallatin
James A. Bayard, Sr.	Christopher Hughes
Henry Clay	Jonathan Russell

Grievances and Origins of the War of 1812

Colonial Loyalist	Non-Intercourse Act (1809)
Embargo Act of 1807	Opposition to the War of 1812 in the United States
Hartford Convention	Origins of the War of 1812

== Presidential letters of Henry Carroll ==
- Carroll, Henry (5 March 1818). "Henry Carroll to James Madison, March 5, 1818". The James Madison Papers at the Library of Congress. United States Library of Congress.
- Carroll, Henry (5 March 1818). "To James Madison from Henry Carroll, 5 March 1818". National Archives Founders Online. U.S. National Archives and Records Administration.
- Madison, James (11 March 1818). "James Madison to Henry Carroll, March 11, 1818". The James Madison Papers at the Library of Congress. United States Library of Congress.
- Madison, James (11 March 1818). "From James Madison to Henry Carroll, 11 March 1818". National Archives Founders Online. U.S. National Archives and Records Administration.

== Bibliography ==
- Pieczynski, Christopher (11 February 2015). "Rediscovering the Treaty of Ghent" [A Paper Presented to the Norfolk Historical Society]. Academia.edu.
- King, Quentin Scott (2014). Henry Clay and the War of 1812. McFarland & Company. ISBN 978-1476613901. OCLC 883896030.
- Hickey, Donald R. (2012). The War of 1812: A Forgotten Conflict (Bicentennial ed.). University of Illinois Press. ISBN 978-0252078378. OCLC 794968648.
- White, Patrick C.T. (1965). "A Nation on Trial: America and the War of 1812". Internet Archive. John Wiley & Sons. OCLC 504120451.
- "Letters Relating to the Negotiations at Ghent, 1812-1814". Internet Archive. American Historical Review. October 1914.
- 63rd U.S. Congress (5 December 1913). "Celebration of the Treaty of Ghent ~ H.R. 9302". Internet Archive. U.S. Government Printing Office.
- Lossing, Benson John (1869). "The Pictorial Field Book of the War of 1812". Google Books. Harper & Brothers. OCLC 951294.
- Lossing, Benson John (1869). "The Pictorial Field Book of the War of 1812". Internet Archive. Harper & Brothers. OCLC 951294.
- Goodrich, Charles A.; Augustus, Charles (1833). "A History of the United States of America: From the Discovery of the Continent by Christopher Columbus, to the Present Time" [Period X - Madison’s Administration]. Internet Archive. H.F. Sumner & Co. pp. 398–467.
- Lowell, John (1812). "Mr. Madison's War: A Dispassionate Inquiry into the Reasons Alleged by Mr. Madison for Declaring an Offensive and Ruinous War against Great-Britain". Internet Archive. Russell & Cutler.
