= HCS Strombolo (1793) =

History

British East India Company
- Builder: Bombay Dockyard
- Launched: 1793
- Fate: Foundered 1809

General characteristics
- Tons burthen: 68 (bm)
- Sail plan: Ketch
- Armament: 12 × 3-pounder guns

HCS Strombolo was a 12-gun ketch of the Bombay Marine launched at the Bombay Dockyard in 1793. She later became a floating battery at Salsette Harbour, having been condemned as unseaworthy. Still, she was pressed into service and sailed from Bombay in 1809 as part of the Persian Gulf campaign of 1809. She foundered on 18 September or 15 October between Bombay and Gujarat while under tow by the sloop-of-war HCS Mornington. Strombolo's bottom dropped out and she sank quickly, taking with her all her stores and most of her officers and crew. Boats from Morington succeeded in rescuing her commander Lieutenant Hall, and 16 crew members; the rest drowned. Another report gives the loss of lives as 2 officers and 14 men.
