= Anthony St. John Baker =

British diplomat and navy officer

- Born: 1785
- Died: 16 May 1854 (aged 68–69); Tunbridge Wells, Kent, England
- Military career
Allegiance
- Branch: Royal Navy
- Service years: 1812–1832
- Other work: British Consul General; British Diplomat; Queen's Messenger; Treaty of Ghent Courier

Anthony St. John Baker (1785 – 16 May 1854) was a British diplomat and Royal Navy officer serving in His Majesty's Foreign Service during England's Regency era.

== Biography ==
During March 1809 to August 1812, British ministers to the United States Anthony Baker and Augustus Foster conveyed Great Britain's Chargé d'affaires administering correspondence to Viscount Castlereagh who became Britain's Secretary of State for Foreign Affairs on 4 March 1812.

Anthony S.J. Baker arrived in the United States in 1812 serving as Secretary of the British Legation. He was summoned in 1813 by the Parliament of Great Britain to serve as Secretary of a British Commission charged with arbitration of the Treaty of Ghent quelling the War of 1812. After ratification by George IV at the Carlton House on 27 December 1814, Henry Carroll and Anthony Baker, who possessed the British ratified peace treaty, boarded HMS Favorite on 2 January 1815 for a voyage to America arriving in Lower New York Bay under a flag of truce on 11 February 1815.

He remained in Washington as His Majesty's Chargé d'affaires, and Edward Nicolls duly wrote to him on 12 June 1815, expressing his concern that Article Nine of the Treaty of Ghent, calling for the restoration of Indian lands to their 1811 boundaries, would not be adhered to. (Note: 'I have been [careful] to prevent a shadow of complaint [on the part] of the United States, well knowing the least thing will suffice as an excuse for their attacking the Indians or robbing them of their Lands.') He served alongside Charles Bagot, who was appointed as British Ambassador to North America, from 1815 to 1820. In 1827 he painted a renowned watercolour, a contemporary depiction of the President’s House (White House) as it stood then, that is considered an authoritative artwork. Baker remained in Colonial America fulfilling the role of British Consul General serving until 1832.

Royal Navy officer Anthony Baker authored an autobiography published in 1850, four years before his death occurring in Tunbridge Wells on 16 May 1854.

== See also ==
♦ Adams–Onís Treaty	♦ Edward Nicolls
♦ HMS Forward (1805)	♦ Impressment
♦ James Monroe	♦ Navigation Acts
♦ Rush–Bagot Treaty	♦ Treaty of 1818

British Peace Treaty Commission at Ghent, United Netherlands

William Adams
James Gambier
Henry Goulburn

== Bibliography ==
- Baker, Anthony St. John (1850). "Mémoires D'un Voyageur Qui Se Repose: With Illustrations : in Four Parts" [Memoirs from a Traveller Who Rests]. Yale University Library catalog. London, England: T. Booker. OCLC 55899187.
- Browning, Thomas Blair (1901). "Bagot, Charles" . In Lee, Sidney (ed.). Dictionary of National Biography (1st supplement). Vol. 1. London: Smith, Elder & Co.
- Updyke, Frank Arthur (1915). The Diplomacy of the War of 1812 [Chapter IX - Ratification and Reception of the Treaty]. Albert Shaw Lectures on Diplomatic History. Johns Hopkins Press. pp. 358–398. OCLC 8138622 – via Internet Archive.

== U.S. Secretary of State Letters of Anthony St. John Baker ==
- Monroe, James (1 April 1815). "James Monroe to Anthony S. Baker, April 1, 1815". Series 2, Additional General Correspondence, 1780-1837. United States Library of Congress.
- Baker, Anthony St. John (3 April 1815). "Anthony S. Baker to James Monroe, April 3, 1815". Series 2, Additional General Correspondence, 1780-1837. United States Library of Congress.
- Baker, Anthony St. John (7 July 1815). "Anthony St. John Baker to James Monroe, July 7, 1815". General Correspondence and Related Items, 1775-1885. United States Library of Congress.
