= Charles Ball =

African-American slave, sailor, and author

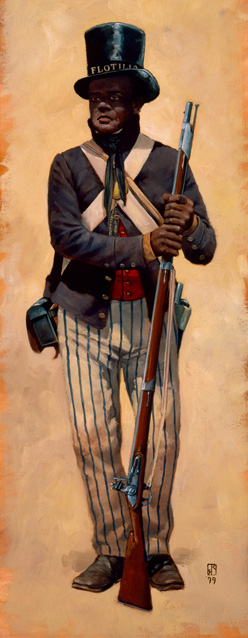
- Charles Ball wearing the uniform of the U.S. Navy's Chesapeake Bay Flotilla under the command of Commodore Joshua Barney in the War of 1812
- Born: Charles Gross c. 1780; Calvert County, Maryland
- Died: unknown
- Occupations: Enslaved field hand; cook; sailor
- Spouse(s): Judah, Lucy
- Children: yes
- Military career
- Allegiance: United States
- Branch: U.S. Navy USS Congress (frigate) (around 1800) Commodore Joshua Barney's Chesapeake Bay Flotilla (1813-1815)
- Conflicts: War of 1812: Battle of St. Jerome Creek (1814); Battle of St. Leonard's Creek (1814); Battle of Queen Anne (1814); Battle of Bladensburg (1814); Battle of Baltimore (1814)

Charles Ball (real name Charles Gross; c. 1780 – unknown) was an enslaved African American from Maryland, best known for his account as a fugitive slave, Slavery in the United States (1836).

== Autobiography ==
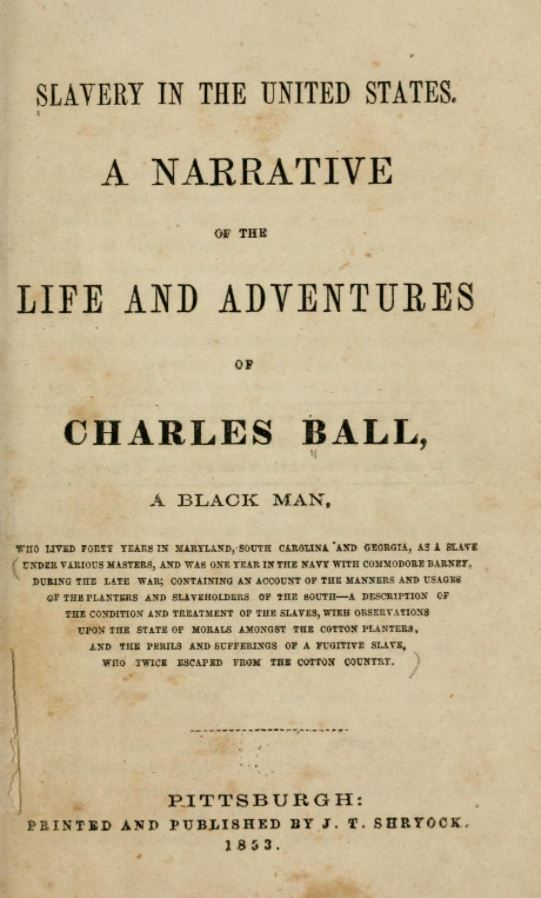
Charles Ball was most well known for his slave narrative, the 1837 book The Life and Adventures of Charles Ball.

The primary source for Ball's life is his autobiography, Slavery in the United States: A Narrative of the Life and Adventures of Charles Ball, a Black Man, Who Lived Forty Years in Maryland, South Carolina and Georgia, as a Slave Under Various Masters, and was One Year in the Navy with Commodore Barney, During the Late War, published in 1837 with the help of Isaac Fisher. An 1846 re-edited version by Frances Catherine Barnard, The Life of a Negro Slave, was published by Charles Muskett. Another edition was published by J. T. Shryock in 1853. In 1859, an abridged edition of this autobiography appeared, called Fifty Years in Chains, or, The Life of an American Slave. The 1859 edition only has 430 pages compared with the original 517. Some valuable parts were omitted in 1859, such as the account of the religion of Ball's African grandfather and all references to Ball's participation in the War of 1812.

Charles Ball's memoir is an account of the life of enslaved people and enslavers in the early 19th century. The book includes the stories of other African Americans with whom the author was acquainted. It is one of the few pieces of Western literature of that time giving a voice to the experience of Africans, including a description of religious customs in the part of Africa where Ball's grandfather grew up and an adventure with lions in the Sahara desert related by a young African.

== African ancestry ==
According to Ball's autobiography, his grandfather was a man from a noble African family who was enslaved and brought to Calvert County, Maryland around 1730.

The 1837 edition describes his religion as the older man explained it to his young grandson. This description has some similarities with Islam, but there are also differences, so it is unclear if his grandfather was Muslim or not. Other Africans, whose religion Ball mentions, are explicitly called "Mohamedans".

The precepts of that religion are contained in a book, a copy of which is kept in each house, implying that the grandfather's African society had a high degree of literacy.

== Life in slavery ==
Charles Ball was born enslaved in Calvert County around 1781. He was about four years old when his legal owner died. To settle the debts of the estate, Ball, his mother, and several brothers and sisters were sold to different buyers. His first childhood memory recorded in the book is his being brutally separated from his mother by her buyer: "Young as I was, the horrors of that day sank deeply into my heart, and even at this time, though half a century has elapsed, the terrors of the scene return with painful vividness upon my memory."

By way of inheritance, sale, and even as a result of a lawsuit, he was passed on to various slave-masters. For two years, starting January 1 of an unknown year around 1800, he was hired out to serve as a cook on the frigate USS Congress that was launched in 1799. After that, he married Judah. When his eldest son was four years old, he was sold to a South Carolinian cotton planter, thus separated from his wife and children, who had to remain with their legal owner in Maryland.

In September 1806, he was given as a present to the newly married daughter of his owner and had to relocate to Georgia to a new plantation. Shortly afterward, after the sudden death of the new husband, the new plantation, Ball, and the other enslaved people were rented out to yet another slave-master, with whom he built up a relationship of mutual trust. He became the headman of the new plantation but suffered from the hatred of his owner's wife. In 1809, when his dying master was already too weak to interfere, he was cruelly whipped by that woman and her brother. After that, he planned his escape, which he executed after his master's death. Traveling by night to avoid the patrols, using the stars and his excellent memory for orientation, suffering terribly from hunger and cold, and not daring to speak to anybody, he returned to his wife and children in early 1810.

== War of 1812 Chesapeake Flotilla service ==
Charles Ball also served in the U.S. Navy during the War of 1812. In 1813, Ball had enlisted in Commodore Joshua Barney's Chesapeake Bay Flotilla and fought at the Battle of Bladensburg on August 24, 1814. An excerpt from his account of the battle, which was a resounding defeat for the Americans:

I stood at my gun, until the Commodore was shot down, when he ordered us to retreat, as I was told by the officer who commanded our gun. If the militia regiments, that lay upon our right and left, could have been brought to charge the British, in close fight, as they crossed the bridge, we should have killed or taken the whole of them in a short time; but the militia ran like sheep chased by dogs.

== Life after the war ==
In 1816, his wife Judah died. Ball married a second time, Lucy, and was able to buy a small farm with money he had earned and saved. In 1830, he was traced down by the man who whipped him 21 years earlier, kidnapped, and again taken to Georgia. He escaped again to learn that Lucy and the children had been kidnapped into slavery, and a white man had taken his farm. Because he was still legally enslaved, he was not able to claim his rights. He relocated to Pennsylvania, where he wrote his 1837 memoir with the help of the white lawyer Isaac Fisher.

Nothing is known of his later fate nor of that of his wife or children.

== Depiction of slavery ==
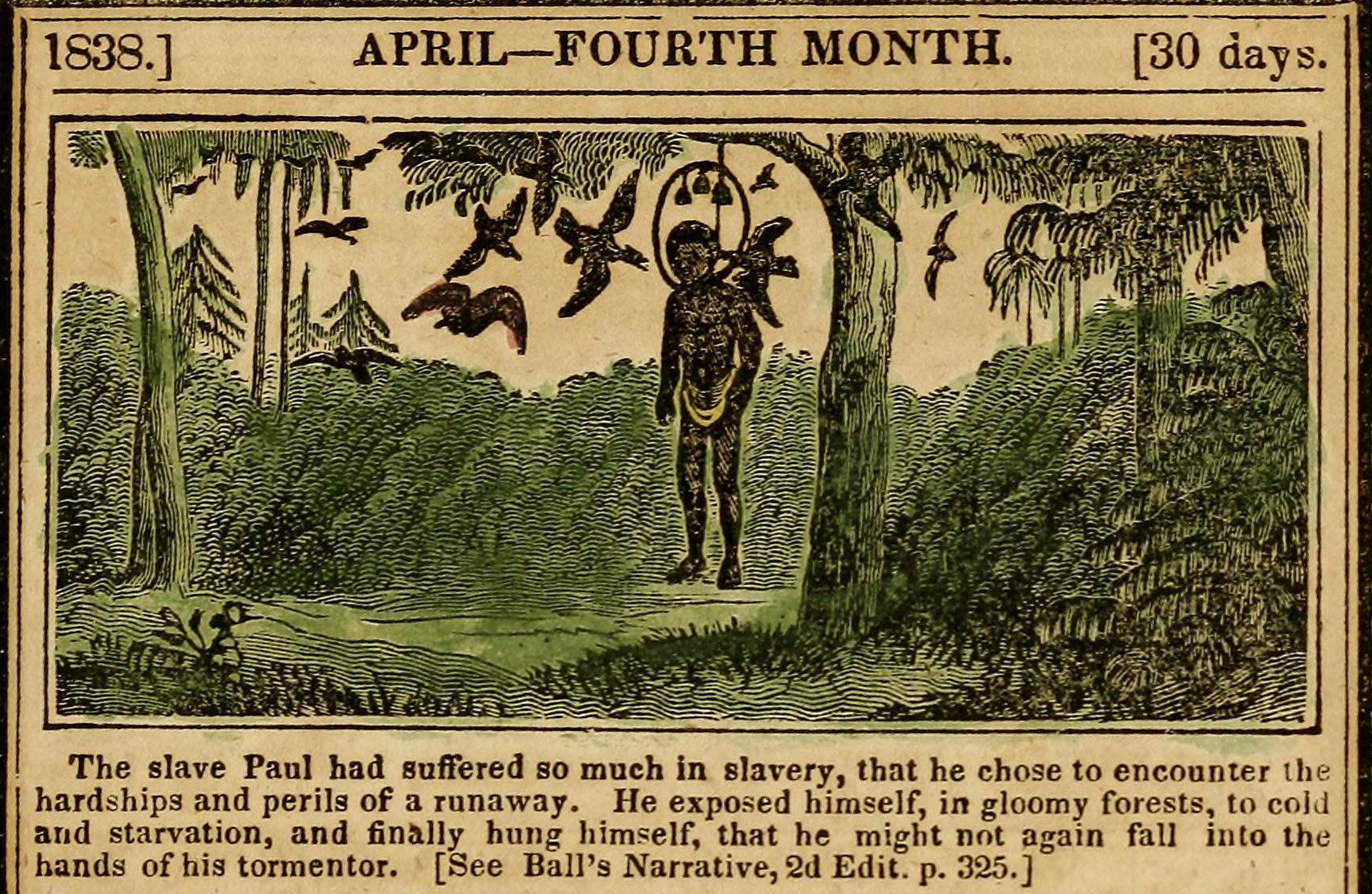
Picture from the American Anti-Slavery Almanac 1838 based on a passage from Ball's memoir: Ball meets Paul, a starving fugitive with an iron collar supporting bells around his neck. The next time Ball comes to Paul's hiding place, he sees that Paul has killed himself.

Recalling the brutal conditions in enslaved life, he describes the heartache of having family members sold away—as his mother and father were, and as he was separated from his wife and children, taken south chained to a line of other enslaved people. The horrific conditions on slave ships bound for the West are also described. On this enslaved person's journey, he recounts that 1/3 of the enslaved people on board the vessel died during the passage to Charleston, South Carolina.

In the autobiography, Ball presents himself (or is presented by the writer) as a kind of model enslaved person who is determined to serve his master "obediently and faithfully" and is proud of the "good character, for industry, sobriety, and humility, which I had established in the neighbourhood". But still, he had to suffer horrible cruelties. As a boy of twelve, he fell into the hands of a severe master who made him work hard while exposing him to hunger and cold. He was forcefully separated from his wife and his children without even being allowed to say goodbye to them. He was kept in chains day and night during a march of four weeks and five days, not even being able to wash the clothes, so that the vermin became "extremely tormenting". One day, he was falsely accused of murder, and without any investigation, his legal owner prepared to have him flayed (skinned) alive. His life was saved only by the coincidental arrival of a white witness of the crime. On another occasion, he was whipped without any reason.

He also related his observations of the life of his fellow enslaved people, e.g., "one very old man, quite crooked with years and labour", being compelled to work although he was no longer able to keep up with the other ones who "had no clothes on him except the remains of an old shirt, which hung in tatters from his neck and arms". On another plantation, in winter, when the frost "was sometimes very heavy and sharp", shoes were distributed only to those forced to pick cotton. "This deprived of shoes, the children, and several old persons, whose eye-sight was not sufficiently clear, to enable them to pick cotton." Enslaved people had to work even while fever-shaken.

Several methods of torture are described in detail. On one occasion, he cites a fellow slave relating the discussion of the slaveholders on how "the greatest degree of pain could be inflicted on me, with the least danger of rendering me unable to work".

== Slavery in Maryland compared to the Deep South ==
While relating the first time he was driven to the Deep South, Ball frequently compares his observations there with the customs of his native Maryland. He summarizes his observations: "The general features of slavery are the same everywhere; but the utmost rigour of the system is only to be met with on the cotton plantations of Carolina and Georgia, or in the rice fields which skirt the deep swamps and morasses of the southern rivers." The day of his arrival on the plantation in South Carolina, he sees all his "future life, one long, waste, barren desert, of cheerless, hopeless, lifeless slavery; to be varied only by the pangs of hunger and the stings of the lash". He observes that the enslaved people there are poorly fed, the children go naked, and the adults are in rags.

== Honors ==
Flotillaman Ball is one of three sailors depicted on the Battle of Bladensburg Monument, at Bladensburg, Maryland.

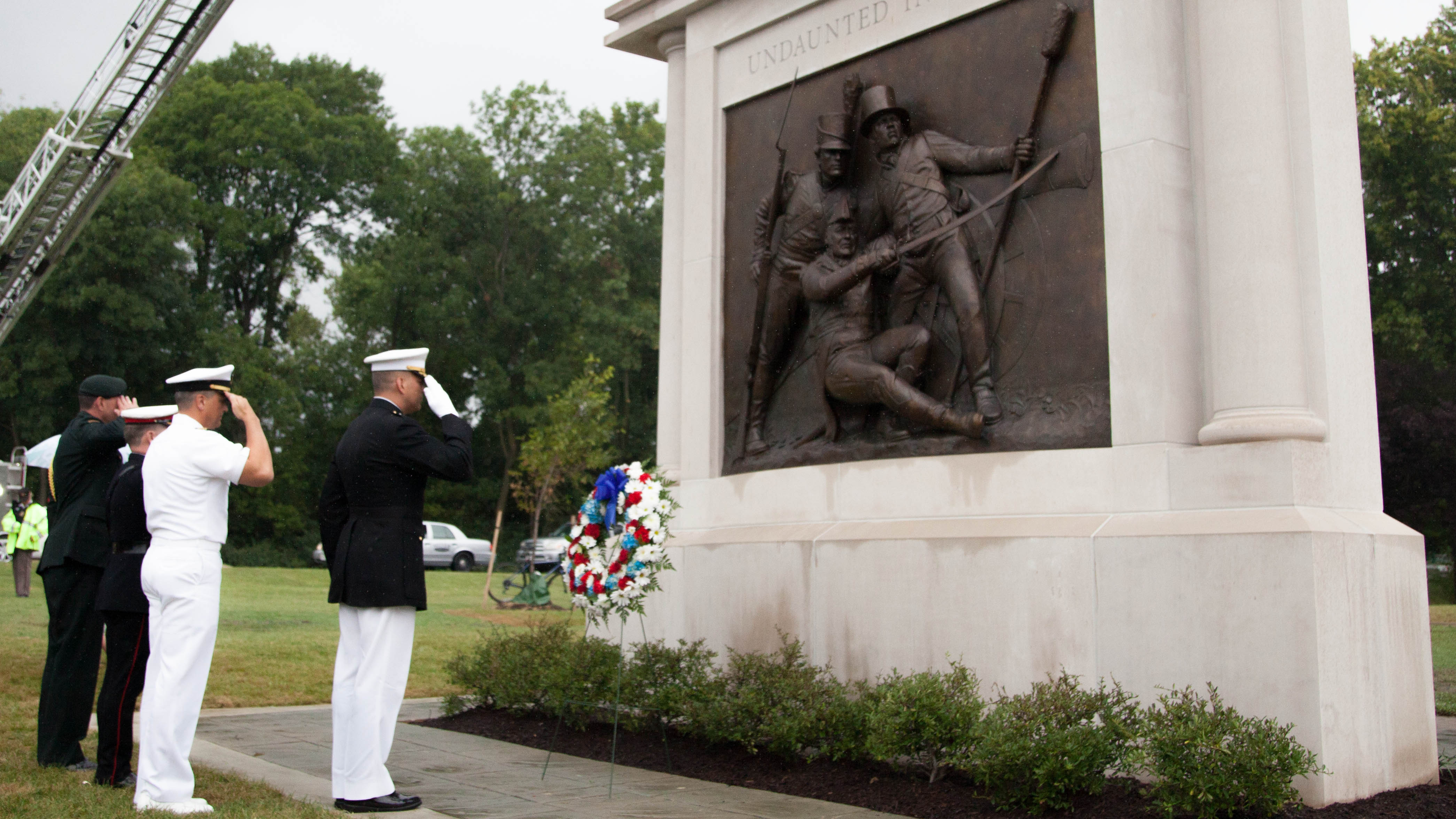
U.S. Navy Honor Guard salute during August 23, 2014 dedication of the official Battle Of Bladensburg Memorial by the State of Maryland showing the bronze relief sculpture of an unidentified U.S. marine, a wounded Commodore Joshua Barney, and Charles Ball the sailor (on the right) rallying around a cannon in the American forces' last stand against the British advance.
