= William Adams (lawyer) =

English lawyer

William Adams (1772–1851) was an English lawyer most notable for his part in negotiating settlements with the United States in the 1814/1815 period.

== Biography ==
Adams was the youngest son of Patience Thomas Adams, filazer of the court of King's Bench, and was born at 39 Hatton Garden in Holborn, London, 13 January 1772. By his father's side he was connected with an old Essex family, and his mother was of the family of William of Wykeham.

He was educated at Tonbridge School, and in 1788 entered Trinity Hall, Cambridge, of which he became a fellow. At the age of twenty-five he began to attend the courts at Doctors' Commons. In 1799 he took the degree of LL.D., and in November of the same year he was admitted into the College of Advocates.

Obtaining a high reputation for business capacity and mastery of legal details, he rendered valuable service on several important commissions. He served on the commission appointed in 1811 to regulate the practice of the vice-admiralty courts abroad, and on that which was occupied from 1815 till 1824 in inquiring into the duties, offices, and salaries of the courts of justice and the ecclesiastical courts of England.

His chief claim to distinction is, however, the part he took in the negotiations for the Treaty of Ghent with the United States in 1814 after the capture of Washington; he was one of the three commissioners sent to represent England, and was entrusted with the sole preparation of the despatches relating to maritime law, the most delicate and important part of the negotiation. In 1815 he was also named one of the three plenipotentiaries sent to conclude a convention of commerce between Great Britain and the United States, which was signed on 3 July.

Excessive labour connected with the preparation of the case against Queen Caroline had serious effects on his health, and in 1825 he was compelled on this account to resign his profession. He spent the last years of his life in retirement at Thorpe in Surrey, where he died 11 June 1851.
