= HMS Favorite (1806) =

Sloop of the Royal Navy

History

United Kingdom
- Name: HMS Favorite
- Ordered: 30 November 1805
- Builder: Jabez Bailey, Ipswich
- Laid down: February 1806
- Launched: 13 September 1806
- Fate: Broken up February 1821

General characteristics
- Tons burthen: 4273/94(bm)
- Length: Overall:108 ft 9 1/2 in (33.2 m); Keel:91 ft 2 5/8 in (27.8 m)
- Beam: 29 ft 8 in (9.0 m)
- Depth of hold: 9 ft 0 in (2.7 m)
- Sail plan: Ship-sloop
- Complement: 121
- Armament: Upper deck: 16 × 32-pounder carronades; QD:6 × 18-pounder carronades; Fc:2 × 6-pounder guns + 2 × 18-pounder carronades

HMS Favorite was an 18-gun Cormorant-class ship-sloop, launched in 1806 and broken up in 1821. In her career she sailed as far North America, the Caribbean, Africa, South America, and the Far East. She captured or recaptured several merchant ships and a handful of privateers.

== Napoleonic Wars ==
Commander John Mairne in November 1806 commissioned Favorite for the Channel Station. On 21 May 1807 he sailed with a convoy for Africa. Nairne died in July and Lieutenant Frederick Hoffman, First Lieutenant of HMS Diamond, was appointed as Favorite's acting commander. On 22 October Favorite arrived at Barbados after a seven-week voyage, having escorted five slave ships from Bance Island, one of the last British convoys of such vessels. (Note: The Slave Trade Act 1807 took effect on 1 May 1807, but the slave ships had been cleared to sail from England before the Act took effect and so were on a legal voyage.)

She then served under the command of Commander William Standway Parkinson in the Leeward Islands. He was promoted to post captain on 9 February 1808 when he arrived at the Admiralty with the dispatches announcing the surrender of the Danish West Indian colonies.

In 1808 Commander Benjamin Clement transferred from HMS Goeland to Favorite. Her primary role was to protect trade from privateers operating out of Cuba. On 24 May Favorite was at Falmouth, Jamaica, when a fire broke out in the town. Clement landed his crew and they saved much property, the hospital, and many houses. While fighting the fire fell through the roof of a house, sustaining some injuries. Subsequently, yellow fever started to devastate his crew, many of whom died; Clement himself survived three attacks. With only 45 men able to man her, Favorite escorted a convoy of 60 merchant vessels, holding five hovering privateers at bay. When he made use of an impress warrant, properly signed by the Governor and a magistrate, in Montego Bay, he was forced to pay £535 damages when two actions were brought against him. (Although the loss was incurred in the course of his duty, he never recovered any money.)

When Favorite returned to Port Royal she received replacement crew from Astraea, which had been wrecked on 24 May 1808. In January 1809 Favorite sailed to Curacoa and Clement visited Caracas. At some point Clement captured a Spanish letter of marque named Esperance, of 10 guns and 40 men. Clement burned Esperrance on the orders of Captain Miciah Malbon, of HMS Adamant. This took place after the United Kingdom and Spain had declared peace, but before official word had reached Jamaica. Esperance's owners sued Clement in the Vice admiralty court in Jamaica. Although the court found in Clement's favor, defending himself cost Clement £300. On 27 July 1809 Favorite sailed from Jamaica as escort to a convoy of 36 merchant vessels to England. On 27 August the convoy encountered a hurricane during which several merchant vessels foundered. Favorite arrived at Deal on 18 September, having lost her top masts and having sustained other damage. Favorite then served on the Plymouth station.

On 9 May 1810, Orestes was eight leagues off The Lizard when she was finally able to capture the French privateer schooner Dorade after a seven-hour chase. Dorade carried ten guns and a crew of 43 men under the command of Emmanuel Ives Le Roux. Favorite had joined the chase and it was fire from Favorite that brought down the privateer's main and foretop masts, enabling Orestes to effect the capture. Dorade was a new vessel on her first cruise; she had left the Île de Batz only the previous evening and had made no captures. (Note: Dorade was a privateer from Saint-Malo commissioned in March 1810. Her first cruise was under Emmanuel-Yves Leroux-Desrochettes with 40 to 43 men, four carriage guns and six swivel guns. She was captured soon after her departure on this cruise.) Droade arrived at Plymouth on 17 May. On 17 December the Swedish vessel Neutrality arrived at Plymouth. She had been sailing from London to Alicante in ballast when Favorite detained her.

Favorite also drove a convoy on shore near the Isle of Bas under the fire of two shore batteries and recaptured several British merchant vessels.

Captain Clement was promoted to post captain on 1 August 1811.

Favorite was reclassified as a post ship. Captain Robert Forbes then took command.

On 21 January 1812 Union, Corbetta, master, arrived at Falmouth. She had been sailing from Corruna to London when a French privateer had captured her. However, Favorite had recaptured Union. The French privateer Brestois captured Vigilant, Stevens, master, on 13 January as Vigilant was sailing from Demerara to Liverpool. Favorite recaptured Vigilant and sent her into Plymouth, where she arrived on 26 January. (Note: Brestois was a privateer from Saint-Malo commissioned in October 1810. She made three cruises. Her first cruise occurred under Aimable-Parfait Sauveur with 106 men and 14 guns from October 1810 to April 1811. She made two more between October 1811 and March 1813 under Julien-Marie-Joseph Gallais, with 105 to 132 men and four 6-pounder and ten 6-pounder carronades. HMS Sybille captured Brestois on 5 February 1813.) (Note: Vigilant, of 219 tons (bm), Stephens, master, had been built in France in 1802. She was armed with ten 6-pounder guns.) On 10 February Two Brothers, Dixey, master, of Saint-Malo, arrived at Plymouth after Favorite had detained her. Captain John Maxwell took command of Favorite on 27 April 1812. On 5 January Lloyd's List reported that Favorite had recaptured and sent into Plymouth Guardian, Musgrave, master, which the French privateer Augusta had captured as Guardian was sailing from Suriname to London. (Note: Guardian, of 229 tons (bm), had been launched at Bridlington in 1801. She was armed with six 6-pounder guns and two 9-pounder carronades. The Register of Shipping reported her trade as London–Cape of Good Hope.) Augusta had also captured two other merchantmen that Foxhound had recaptured.

Favorite sailed for the West Coast of Africa on 2 June 1813 and had arrived by mid-July; she was at Cape Coast Castle by August. Maxwell visited all the British settlements on the coast of Africa, destroyed several slave forts on the Rio Pongus and captured four Portuguese slavers.

In 1814 Favorite went int Ordinary at Woolwich. Between June and October she was under the command of Captain John Maples as she underwent repairs at Woolwich.

Captain the Honourable James Ashley Maude received promotion to post captain on 11 March 1814. He then recommissioned Favorite on 14 October. He sailed her to convey two diplomats to North America, (Note: Mr. Baker left for Plymouth... with the Treaty of Peace, which he carries out to the American Government, for ratification. He was accompanied by Mr. Carroll, Secretary to Mr. Clay, one of the American Commissioners... They sail immediately from Plymouth, in the Favourite sloop of war, which is considered a fast sailing vessel.) departing Plymouth on 2 January (Note: Plymouth, 2 January 1815. Favorite SW with dispatches sailed for America.) (Note: Plymouth, Jan 2nd. Sailed Brazen, Favorite and Insolent, to the westward.), arriving in Lower New York Bay under a flag of truce on 11 February 1815. He brought home the ratification (17 February 1815) by the United States Senate of the Treaty of Ghent that ended the War of 1812. He arrived at the Foreign office on 13 March 1815.

== Post-war ==
After the battle of Waterloo, Captain Maude sailed Favorite to India with the news of Napoleon's defeat. She apparently reached Madras on the same day that the overland express arrived there.

On 17 June 1816 Favorite detained Sullimany and sent her into Bombay for adjudication. The Vice admiralty court found that Sullimany had been carrying 14 Negro slaves and confiscated them.

In July 1816, Maude discovered eight islands on the southern side of the Persian Gulf, previously unknown to European navigators.

Favorite left Trincomalee, Ceylon, for home on 26 December 1816. She carried several passengers, including Captain Hew Stewart, whom a court martial had dismissed from command of HMS Towey on nine charges, including tyranny, oppression, and unofficer-like conduct. Favorite was at the Cape of Good Hope for a month. She left St Helena on 29 March 1817 and arrived back at Portsmouth on 25 May. By June 1817 Favorite was at Deptford about to be paid off.

Between September and December Favorite was at Deptford, refitting for foreign service. Captain Hercules Robinson recommissioned her in September. He sailed her for St. Helena, River Plate, and Newfoundland. Favorite returned via Gibraltar and Cadiz, arriving home on 21 December 1820. She then was paid off.

== Fate ==
Favorite was broken up at Portsmouth in February 1821.
