= Frances Catherine Barnard =

English writer, poet and playwright

Frances Catherine Barnard (pen name, Mrs. Alfred Barnard; 7 May 1796 – 30 January 1869) was an English writer, poet, and playwright. She was the author of various dramatic works and tales. Active in the 1800s, her work was published in England and in Australia. Much of her writing was related to the education of children. In the preface to Doleful Death and The Flowery Funeral of Fancy she wrote:— "For myself, if but one youthful mind become wiser or better from the perusal of my rhymes, I shall consider my trouble amply repaid".

== Early years and family ==
Frances Catherine (sometimes spelled Katherine) Smith was born at Norwich, Norfolk, England, 7 May 1796; and christened on 5 June 1796 at Octagon-Presbyterian, Norwich. She was the eldest daughter and co-heir of Francis Smith, of Norwich (descendant of Robert Pierrepont, 1st Earl of Kingston-upon-Hull) and Sarah (Marsh). Her uncle was Sir James Edward Smith, a successful botanist at the time who co-founded the Linnean Society.

On 10 Nov 1817, she married Alfred Barnard (b. Norwich, 1793) at St. Peter Mancroft, Norwich, gentleman, of the family of Barnard of Wansford Manor, Yorkshire, Iselham Hall, Cambridgeshire, Abington Hall, Northamptonshire, and Brampton Hall, Huntingdonshire, Baronets. Together they had 10 children between 1819 and 1830. Frances Hinderly was baptized in 1819, and Mary, in 1820. Their eldest son was Alfred Francis Barnard (1821–1894). Four baptisms occurred in 1836: Alicia Mildred, Robert, Frederic William, and Jane Catherine. Alicia Mildred Barnard (1825–1911) was a plant illustrator and a member of the Botanical Society of London. Francis (1823–1912) was a microscopist, chemist, druggist, as well as a member of the Botanical Society of London who emigrated from Great Yarmouth, Norfolk to Australia. Two of her sons, Frederick William Barnard and Algernon Sidney Barnard, also moved to Australia, where Algernon was stabbed to death.

== Career ==
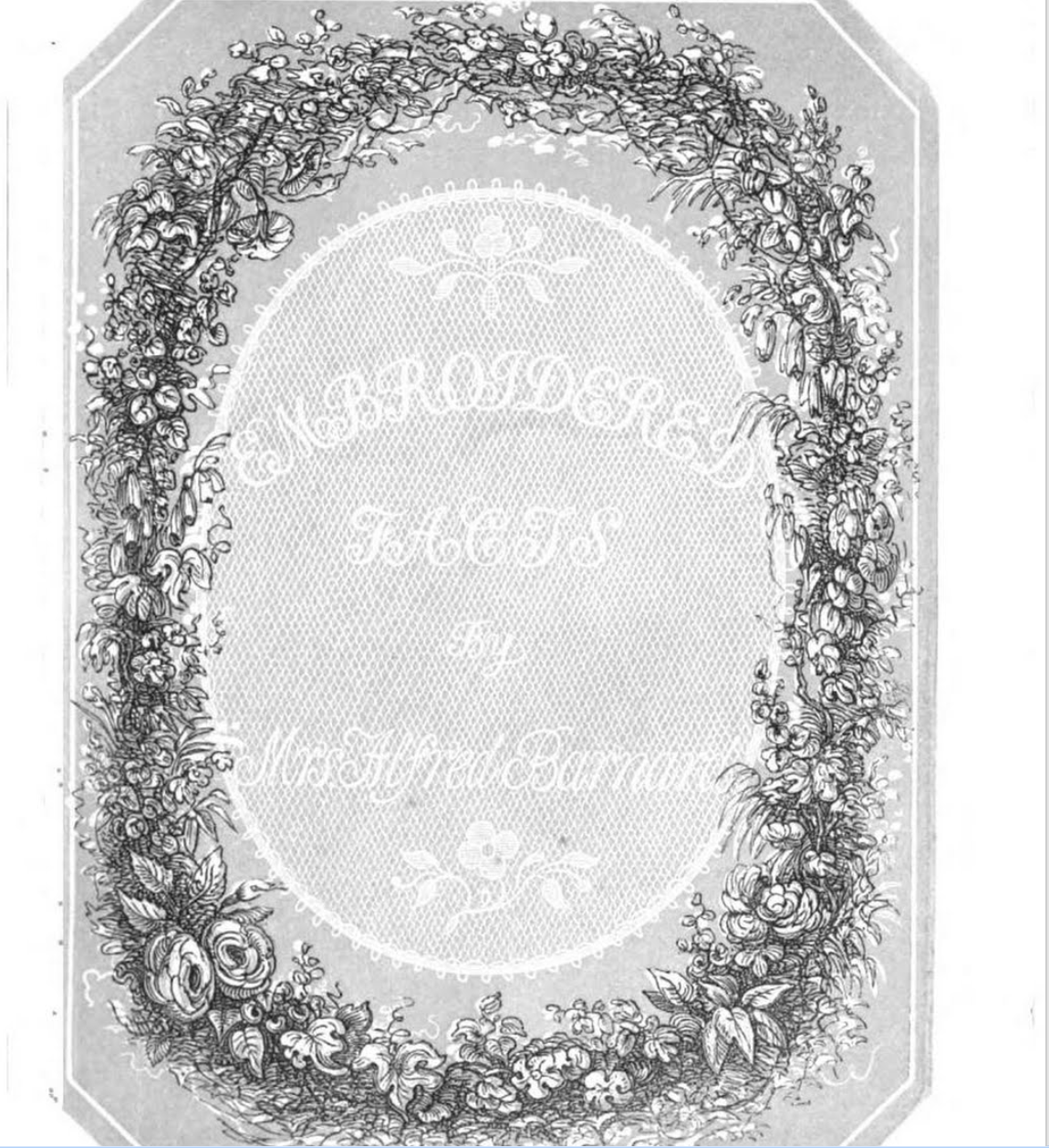
Embroidered Facts by Frances Catherine Barnard

Barnard authored and edited many books, writing under the name "Frances Catherine Barnard" and "Mrs. Alfred Barnard". Some of them included:

- Embroidered Facts (1836, Orr and Smith; book of plays)
- Doleful Death and The Flowery Funeral Of Fancy (1837, Harvey and Darton; poems)
- Conversations at the Work-Table
- The Schoolfellows; Holidays at the Hall: (1845, Joseph Graham)
- The Cottage and The Hall (1840)
- The Life of a Negro Slave (1846, Charles Muskett); re-edited memoir of Charles Ball

Barnard died at the age of 72 on 10 January 1869 in Norwich, and was buried in Rosary Cemetery, Norwich.
