= John Wainwright (Royal Navy officer) =

Royal Navy officer

Captain John Wainwright CB
- Born: Wickham, Hampshire
- Died: November 4, 1819; Portsmouth, Great Britain
- Education: Royal Naval Academy
- Spouse: Harriet Wainwright
- Children: James Francis Ballard Wainwright
- Military career
- Allegiance: Kingdom of Great Britain; United Kingdom / British Empire
- Branch: Royal Navy
- Service years: 1783–1819
- Rank: Captain
- Commands: HMS Sulphur; HMS Seagull; HMS Royal William; HMS Chiffonne; HMS Tonnant
- Conflicts: Napoleonic Wars • Battle of the Basque Roads; Persian Gulf campaign of 1809; War of 1812 • Battle of Baltimore • Battle of Bladensburg • Burning of Washington
- Awards: Order of the Bath

John Wainwright CB was an officer in the Royal Navy.

== Career ==
In 1806, he became captain of the frigate HMS Chiffonne and, in 1809, was the commodore of a squadron sent to suppress pirates in the Persian Gulf.

After having led that joint-services expedition to ‘burn the Pirates out of the Gulf’, he was awarded a scimitar by a grateful emir and a gift ‘for plate’ by the East India Company. In recompense for the period without the opportunity to capture prizes, he was invited to escort on Chiffonne the 1810 Trade fleet from India to China, involving a lucrative ‘freight’ fee.

At the end of 1813, he was appointed to command HMS Asia. Wainwright was exchanged commands with Captain Alexander Skene of HMS Tonnant. In 1814, he captained Admiral Cochrane's flagship, Tonnant, and saw action against the Chesapeake Bay Flotilla of Joshua Barney in the War of 1812., Barney was accompanied by Wainwright when captured, and 'behaved to me as if I was a brother.' Wainwright subsequently landed some of the Marines who later helped burn Washington, and was mentioned in despatches by Rear Admiral Cockburn as a consequence. He was personally tasked with returning to London at the start of September 1814 to deliver the dispatch from Vice Admiral Cochrane.

== Later life and family ==
In 1819, he became lieutenant governor of the Royal Naval College in Portsmouth but died within ten days.

John Wainwright's father, also John, had been an RN Master's Mate at the siege of Quebec, his elder son, also John, was navigating lieutenant on HMS Blossom on the 1825–1828 Beechey expedition through the Bering Strait, and his younger son James Francis Ballard Wainwright C.B. was commissioning captain on HMS Black Prince.

== See also ==
- British Warships in the Age of Sail

== Bibliography ==
- Crawford, Michael J.; Hughes, Christine F., eds. (2002). The Naval War of 1812: A Documentary History, Vol. 3. Washington: Naval Historical Center (GPO). ISBN 978-0-16-051224-7.
- The Naval Chronicle, vol. 31, London: Joyce Gold, 1814
- The Naval Chronicle, vol. 32, London: Joyce Gold, 1814
