= HCS Mornington (1799) =

History

United Kingdom
- Name: HCS Mornington
- Namesake: Richard Wellesley, 1st Marquess Wellesley, 2nd Earl of Mornington (General Wellington)
- Owner: British East India Company (EIC)
- Operator: EIC
- Builder: Jamsetjee Wadia, Bombay Dockyard
- Launched: 1799, Bombay
- Fate: Sold at auction

General characteristics
- Tons burthen: 350, or 458 (bm)
- Armament: 20 × 32-pounder carronades + 4 × 18-pounder guns

HCS Mornington was a 24-gun sloop-of-war of the Bombay Marine launched in 1799 at the Bombay Dockyard. She participated in several campaigns and actions before the East India Company sold her at some point between 1813 and 1819.

== Career ==
Mornington sailed from Bombay in September 1800, carrying dispatches to Madras. From there she convoyed three merchantmen for Calcutta.

In 1801, a court-martial dismissed Captain Richardson from command of Mornington for "improper behavior" in the presence of the enemy in the Bay of Bengal.

In 1803, the insurance industry in Calcutta presented Captain Hart, of Mornington, and Captain Charles Adam of HMS Sybille with valuable swords for having captured French warships and privateers.

Later in 1803, Mornington was under the command of Captain W.J.Hamilton. The EIC had decided 1803 to re-establish the EIC outpost at Balambangan. Mornington sailed from Malacca on 29 August 1803 as the escort to the transports of the expedition. (Note: The outpost was established by September, but abandoned in 1806.)

In 1805, the Al Qasimi Arabs of the Gulf captured two merchant brigs, Shannon and Trimmer. The Al Qasimi converted Trimmer into a formidable warship. In July Mornington appeared off the coast and demanded Trimmer's return. Nearly 40 Al Qasimi vessels attacked Mornington, which only just managed to escape destruction herself.

Later in 1808, a huge fleet of 50 raiders appeared off Sind in the Arabian Sea and caused severe disruption to the regional trade. The fleet attacked merchant shipping along the Indian coast and even seized a large country ship named Minerva. Her captors massacred her crew and converted her into their flagship. At the height of their campaign, the Al Qasimi forces in the Persian Gulf and Arabian Sea included an estimated 60 large bhagalas, over 800 dhows, and employed 19,000 men, against just two EIC ships, Mornington and Teignmouth. Mornington was in almost continuous action.

Mornington was one of the many EIC and Royal Navy vessels that participated in the subsequent Persian Gulf campaign of 1809.

== Fate ==
Mornington still appeared in news reports into 1813. She was not listed in 1819.
