= USS Scorpion (1812) =

History

United States
- Name: USS Scorpion
- Namesake: Scorpion
- Completed: 1812
- Commissioned: September 1812
- Fate: Burned to prevent capture 21 August 1814

General characteristics
- Type: Self-propelled floating artillery battery
- Length: 48 ft 8 in (14.83 m)
- Beam: 18 ft 2 in (5.54 m)
- Draft: 4 ft 6 in (1.37 m)
- Propulsion: Sails and oars
- Sail plan: Sloop-rigged
- Complement: 25
- Armament: 1 × 24-pounder gun; 1 × 18-pounder gun; 2 × 12-pounder carronades

USS Scorpion was a self-propelled floating artillery battery in commission with the United States Navy from 1812 to 1814.

Scorpion was sloop-rigged and could also be propelled by oars. She probably was built under contract for the U.S. Navy in 1812 for service during the War of 1812. Lieutenant Edmond P. Kennedy assumed command of the ship at Norfolk, Virginia, in September 1812.

On 29 March 1813, Scorpion was ordered to the Potomac River to serve in the Potomac Flotilla, which was to protect Washington, D.C. Since Lieutenant Kennedy was to command the flotilla, Lieutenant George C. Read became the commanding officer of Scorpion on 4 May 1813.

On 18 February 1814, Scorpion reported for duty at Baltimore, Maryland, in Commodore Joshua Barney's Chesapeake Bay Flotilla and became Commodore Barney's flagship. On 24 May 1814, with Major William B. Barney, Commodore Barney's son, acting as captain of Scorpion, the flotilla sailed for the lower Chesapeake Bay in an attempt to stop the British from advancing toward Washington. On 1 June 1814, a British squadron was encountered at the mouth of the Patuxent River, and the flotilla was forced to retreat up the river. During the following weeks, Commodore Barney's flotilla engaged the British on several occasions and was able to delay the British advance. Finally, on 21 August 1814, facing overwhelming odds, Barney was forced to retreat and landed his men at Pig Point, near Upper Marlboro, Maryland. Barney and his men then marched to assist in the defense of Washington, leaving Scorpion and the rest of the flotilla to be burned by a detail of men under Lieutenant Solomon Frazier to prevent the capture of the ships by the British.

For more than a century, the remains of some of the flotilla were visible in the Patuxent River mud, however by the mid-20th century, it had become invisible due to salvage hunters and the accumulation of silt.

In 1979, marine researchers explored the Pig Point waters and located a shipwreck they thought to be Scorpion. Later, U.S. Navy and State of Maryland divers began exploring the site.

The researchers issued a report in 2011.

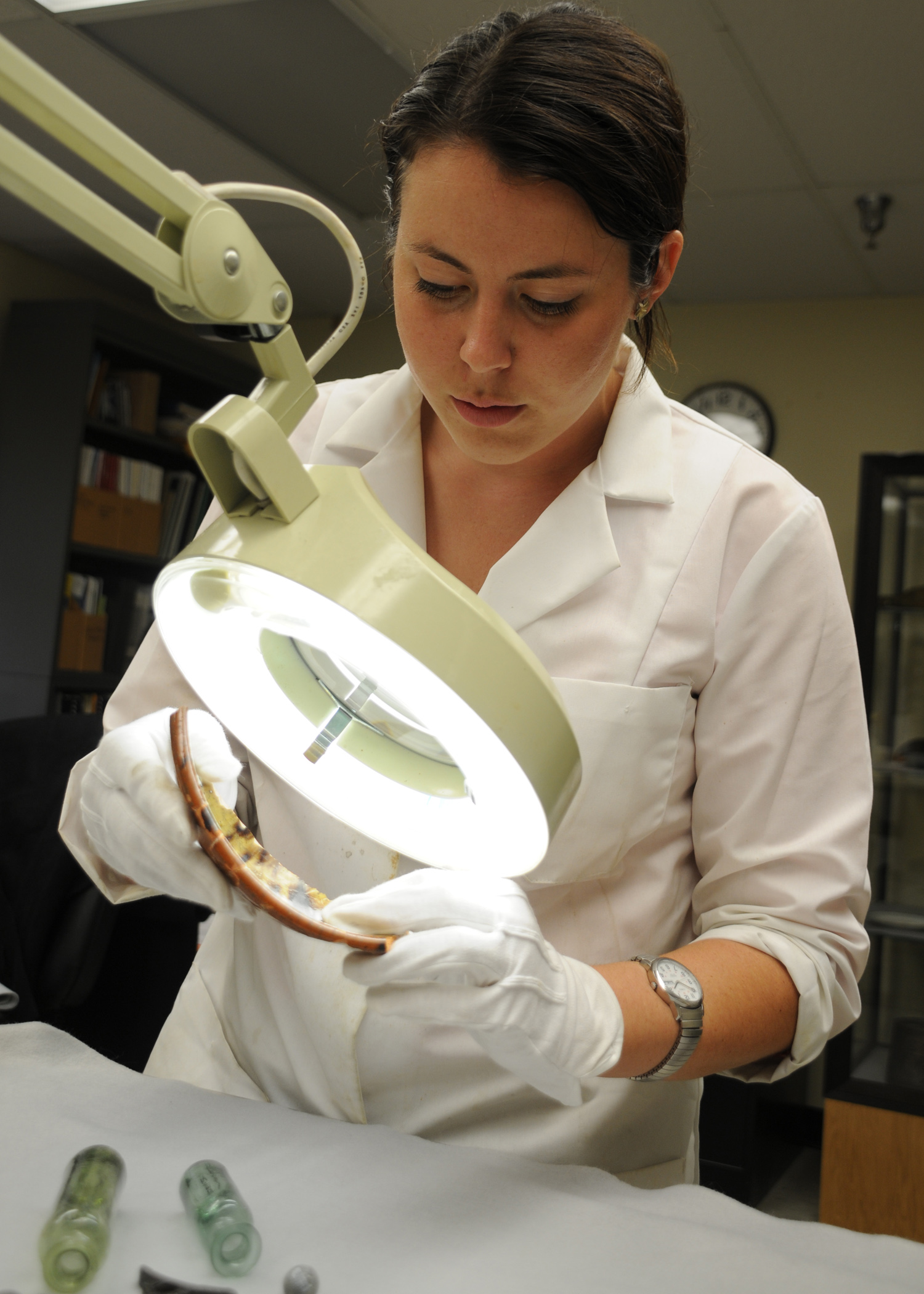
An artifact conservator at Naval History & Heritage Command inspects a piece of pottery recovered from the wreck of Scorpion.
