= Persian Gulf campaign of 1809 =

British naval expedition against the Al-Qasimi family

- Part of Piracy in the Persian Gulf
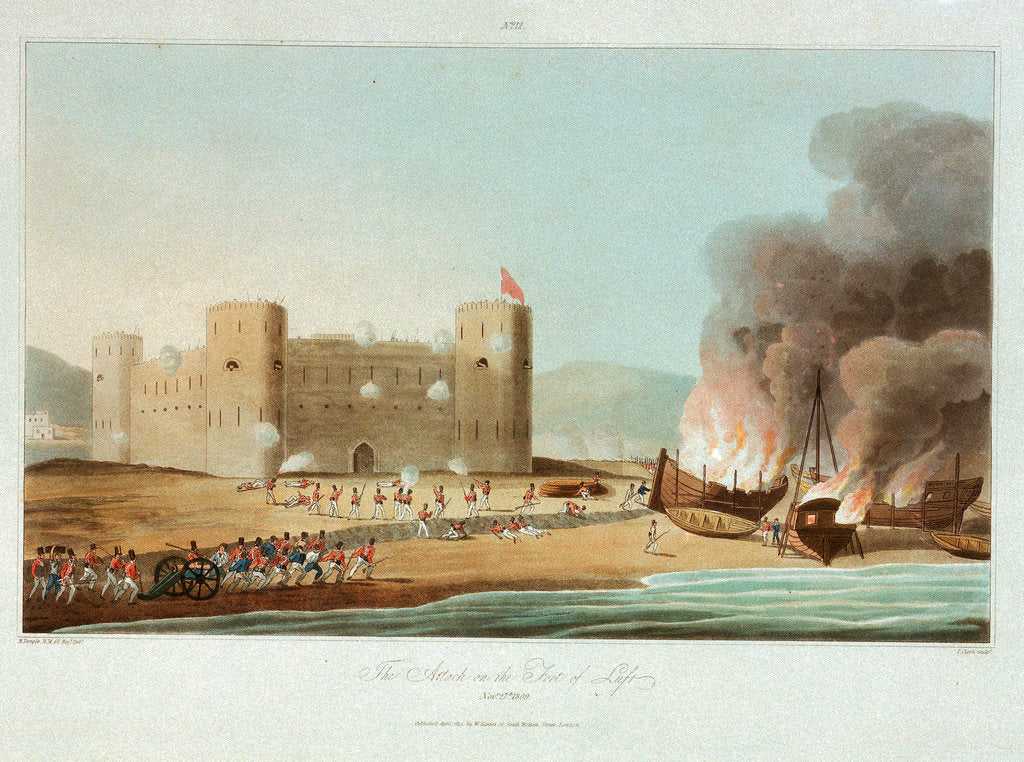
- The fort of Luft under attack by the British, 27 December 1809
Date	September–December 1809
Location	Strait of Hormuz and Ras Al Khaimah
Result	British victory

Belligerents
United Kingdom; East India Company	Ras Al Khaimah; Al-Qawasim

Commanders and leaders
Lionel Smith; John Wainwright	Hassan bin Rahma; Hassan bin Ali

Strength
Unknown	2,000

Casualties and losses
Ras Al Khaimah: 5 killed 34 wounded Further operations: 70 killed and wounded Heavy casualties	Ras Al Khaimah: Unknown; 50 vessels burned Further operations: 50 killed 31 vessels burned

The Persian Gulf campaign of 1809 was an operation by the British East India Company and Royal Navy to force the Al Qasimi (plural Qawasim, referred to by the British at the time as 'Joasmees') to cease their attacks on British ships in the Persian Gulf, particularly on the Persian and Arab coasts of the Strait of Hormuz. The operation's success was limited as the British did not press their advantage when invading Ras Al Khaimah and embarked without consolidating their gains and failed to permanently suppress the strong fleets of the Qawasim of Ras Al Khaimah and Sharjah. The expedition did achieve its short-term goals by destroying three Al Qasimi bases and over 80 vessels, including the largest Al Qasimi ship in the region, the converted merchant ship Minerva. Although operations continued into 1810, the British were unable to destroy every Al Qasimi vessel. By 1811, attacks had resumed, although at a lower intensity than previously.

The operation against the Qawasim was a joint campaign by the Royal Navy and the fleet of the Honourable East India Company (HEIC), with soldiers drawn from the garrison of Bombay. The expeditionary force, led by Captain John Wainwright in the Navy frigate HMS Chiffonne, was despatched to the region, following an escalation in attacks on British shipping in the Persian Gulf after the French established diplomatic missions in Muscat and Tehran in 1807. These attacks not only threatened British trade links in the region, but also placed British relations with Oman and Persia in jeopardy at a time when French aspirations against British India were a cause for concern to the British government.

Because the available charts of the Persian Gulf were inaccurate or incomplete at the time, Al Qasimi ships could hide from Wainwright's squadron in the uncharted inlets, a problem Wainwright reported upon his return that resulted in improved British cartography of the area.

== Background ==
In the early 19th century, the Indian Ocean was an important link in the trade routes from British India to the United Kingdom, and Honourable East India Company (HEIC) merchant ships, known as East Indiamen, regularly crossed the ocean carrying millions of pounds worth of goods. One of the most important ports for the Indian trade was Bombay, on the western coast of the Indian subcontinent, a significant hub for regional trade with its links to the Persian and Arab ports of the Persian Gulf. The ships that traded in the Persian Gulf were named "country ships" and were much smaller and weaker than the big East Indiamen. The British had long maintained a naval presence in the region, but the outbreak of the Napoleonic Wars in 1803 diverted much of the British strength in the Indian Ocean to the Dutch colonies of the Cape of Good Hope and Java and the French bases on Île Bonaparte and Île de France, leaving the Persian Gulf and Arabian Sea largely undefended. In addition, convoy guardships were needed to escort the East Indiamen through hostile waters and the Navy presence in the Gulf was replaced by warships belonging to the "Bombay Marine", the HEIC's naval arm.

The vessels of the Bombay Marine were spread across many thousands of miles of ocean, often leaving the country ships in the Persian Gulf undefended. As French raiders were rare in the Gulf, few country ships operated in convoys and so they became targets for dhows and bhagalas operating from semi or completely independent harbours in Persia or along the Arabian Peninsula.

The Qawasim, a federation of tribes spanning Sharjah, Ras Al Khaimah, Qeshm and Laft, were the dominant local force and in alliance with the Omani Imam but at war with the Sultan of Muscat who had been a British ally since 1798. Omani ships from both sides cruised the Gulf and those allied to the deposed Imam felt free to attack the ships of their enemy's ally: the British.

In 1805, the Qawasim captured two large ships, Shannon and Trimmer; the small boats of the Qawasim swarmed the larger merchant ships and massacred the crews. The Qawasim converted Trimmer into a formidable pirate ship. When the warship HCS Mornington, which carried 24 guns and carronades, attempted to recapture Trimmer a few months later, nearly 40 Al Qasimi vessels attacked Mornington, which only just managed to escape destruction herself.

=== Diplomatic failures ===
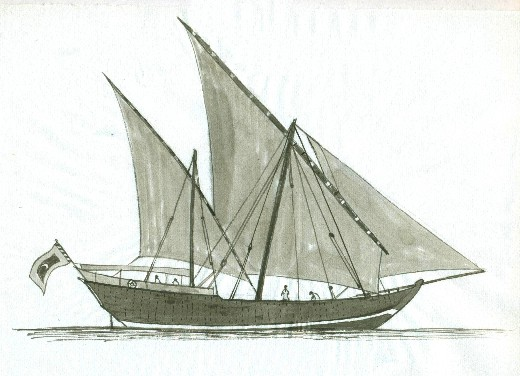
A painting of a Baghlah.

Lacking the available naval forces to launch a sizeable campaign in the Gulf, the British authorities attempted to use diplomacy to end the threat. In February 1806, the young Sultan of Oman, Sa'id II ibn Sultan, signed a treaty at Bandar Abbas promising to bring an end to attacks originating from his territory, but by 1807 the French had installed consulates in Tehran and Muscat and attacks continued unabated with their encouragement. In 1807, Lord Minto, Governor General of India, determined to send ambassadors to the Sikh Empire, Afghanistan and Persia in an effort to secure their support and prevent the French from gaining allies on India's western borders. As part of this diplomatic campaign, the ambassador to Persia was instructed to discuss the problem with the Persian government, but due to French influence in Tehran, he was unable to obtain any guarantees.

A second diplomatic mission, sent from London in 1808 under Sir Harford Jones, was instructed to discuss the issue again, Jones deciding to travel to Bushire in Persia by sea. The diplomatic convoy consisted of the frigate HMS Nereide and two sloops, HCS Sylph and HMS Sapphire. The convoy was commanded by Captain Robert Corbet, who refused to wait for the slower sloops once the force had reached the Persian Gulf. Nereide arrived at Bushire on 14 October 1808. Jones completed his journey by land. Corbet returned south to the Straits of Hormuz, expecting to meet the sloops on his return journey. On 21 October, however, he discovered Sylph in the hands of Al Qasimi, who had swarmed the isolated warship, captured her, and massacred her crew. Corbet was able to recapture Sylph and later rejoined Sapphire, which had been detached to conduct surveys of the Arabian coast, but the operation demonstrated that it was the pirates who now controlled the Southern Persian Gulf.

=== Al Qasimi in the Arabian Sea ===
In April 1808, despite the brief deployment of the ship of the line HMS Albion, and frigates HMS Phaeton and Dédaigneuse to the Persian Gulf, Al Qasimi dhows appeared off Gujarat, raiding shipping at Surat before they were driven off by ships of the Bombay Marine. Later in the year, a huge fleet of 50 raiders appeared off Sind in the Arabian Sea and caused severe disruption to the regional trade. The fleet attacked merchant shipping along the Indian coast and even seized a large country ship named Minerva, massacring her crew and converting her into their flagship. At its height in early 1809, it was estimated that the Al Qasimi forces in the Persian Gulf and Arabian Sea included 60 large bhagalas, over 800 dhows, and employed 19,000 men, against just two HEIC ships, Mornington and Teignmouth.

== British operations ==
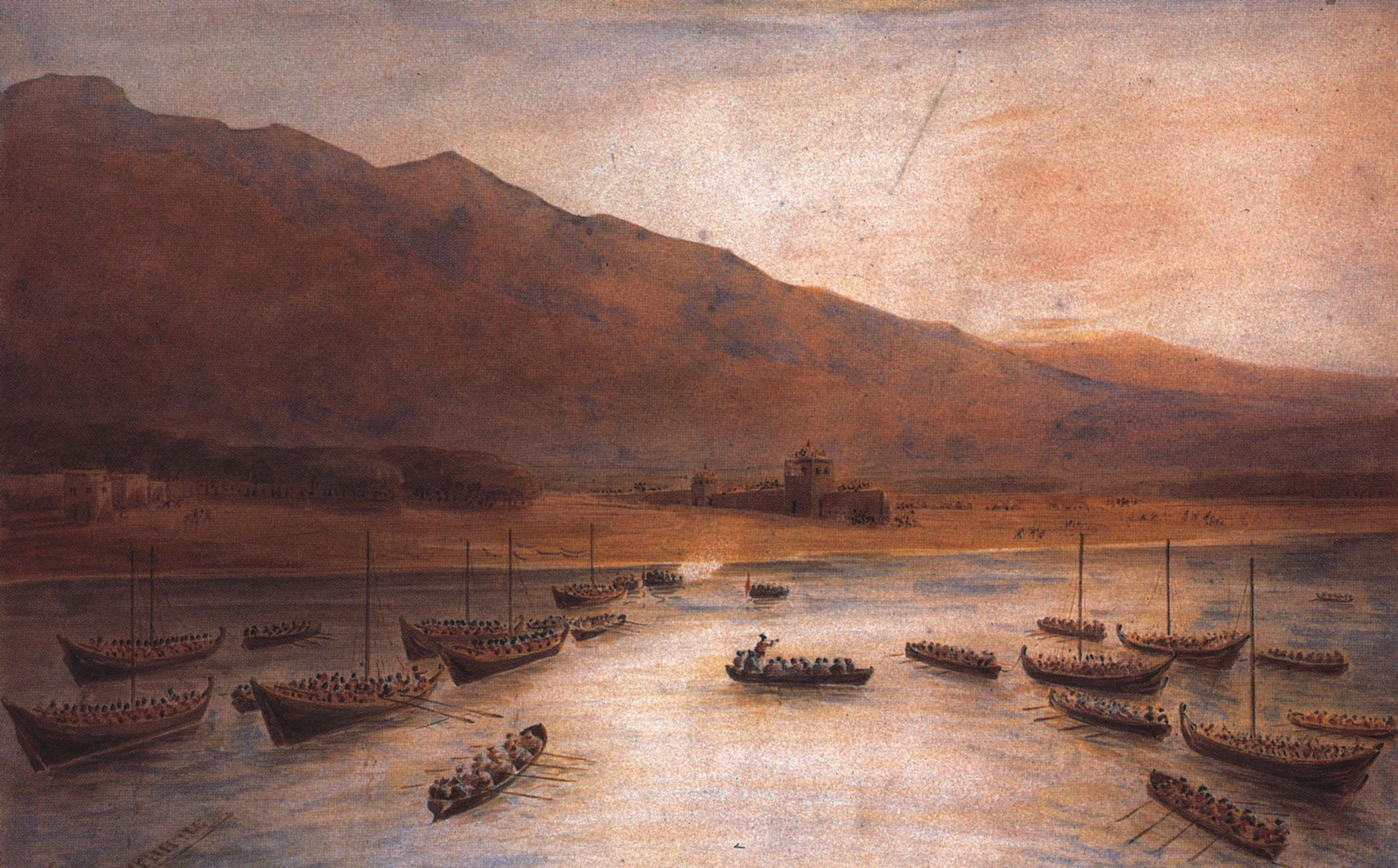
A painting depicting British Expeditionary Force of 1809 landing troops at Ras Al Khaimah

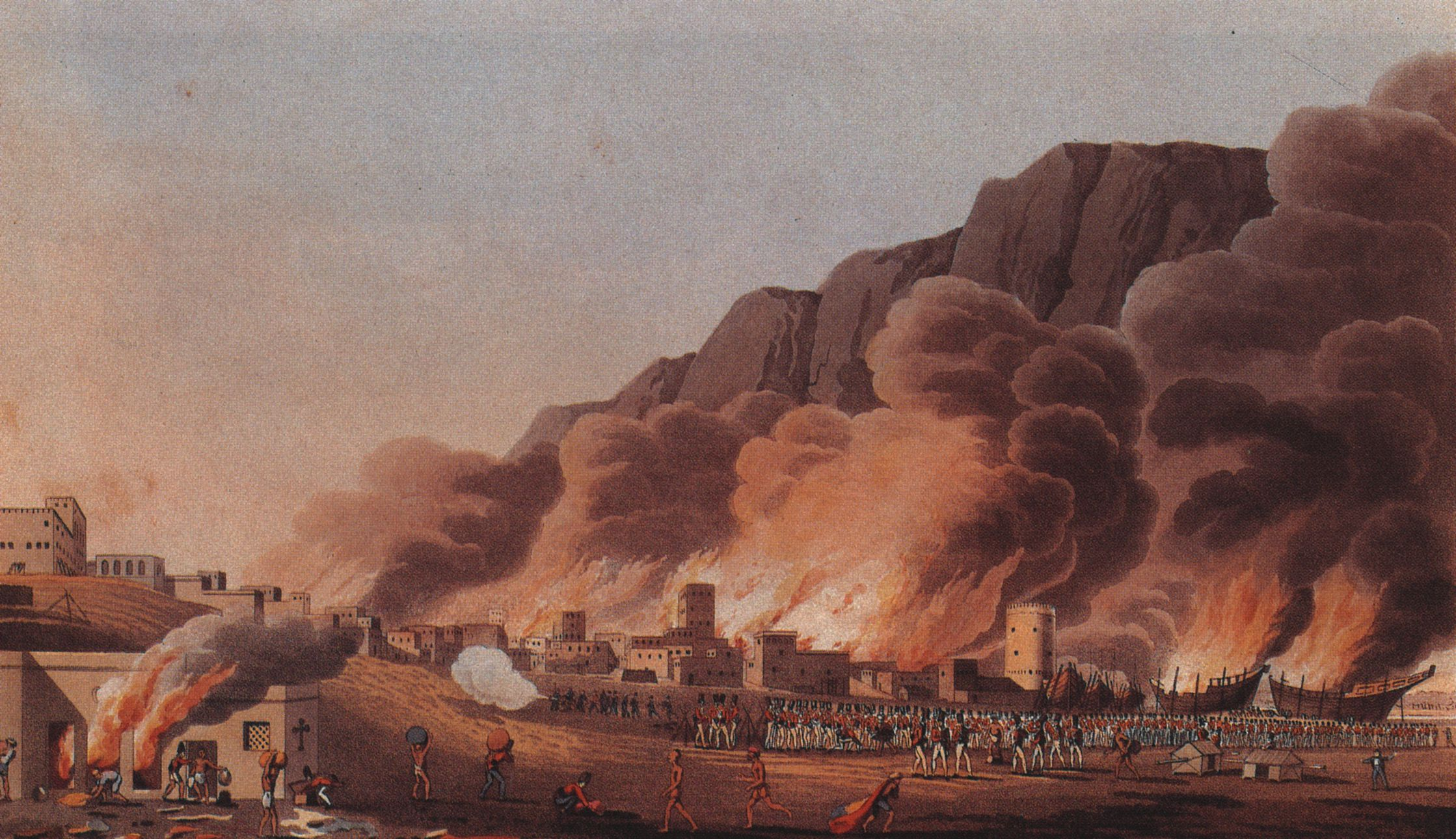
An aquatint depicting the sacking of the coastal town and port of Ras Al Khaimah, by a British officer, Richard Temple.

In the aftermath of the raid on Sind and following the 1809 monsoon season, the British authorities in India decided to make a significant show of force against the Qawasim, in an effort not only to destroy their larger bases and as many ships as could be found, but also to counteract French encouragement of them from their embassies in Persia and Oman. Forces were gathered at Bombay during the summer: the small HEIC warships, Mornington, Aurora, Ternate, Mercury, Nautilus, Prince of Wales, Ariel, Fury, and the bomb ketch Strombolo, and the Royal Navy frigates Caroline under Charles Gordon and Chiffonne under John Wainwright, who was placed in command of the entire expeditionary force with the temporary rank of commodore. The force was complemented with troops seconded from the Bombay garrison, including a battalion of the 65th Foot, soldiers from the 47th Foot and an assortment of HEIC marines, engineers, artillery men, and sepoys from the 2nd Bombay Native Infantry under the command of Lieutenant Colonel Lionel Smith of the 65th.

The expeditionary force left Bombay on 17 September, intending to rendezvous at Muscat the following week. However, the force was repeatedly delayed during their passage, first with providing escorts to convoys of country ships in the Arabian Sea and subsequently with rescuing survivors of the Stromboli, which was so rotten that she fell apart in the ocean swell with considerable loss of life. When the force eventually arrived at Muscat in October, Sultan Sa'id informed Wainwright that over 20,000 Bedouin warriors had descended on the coast to join the Qawasim. Understanding that a protracted land campaign would be impossible with the forces available, Wainwright determined to make a series of small raids against the principal pirate bases in the area of the Straits of Hormuz, beginning with Ras Al Khaimah, to the north of the Strait on the Arabian coast.

=== Battle of Ras al-Khaimah ===
The British flotilla arrived off the independent town of Ras Al Khaimah on 11 November, discovering Minerva and a fleet of dhows in the harbour. The pirate fleet initially sailed out to attack the British but retreated once the size of the expeditionary force became clear. Minerva failed to make the return to port successfully and was wrecked on a sandbank, the crew setting fire to their ship to prevent her seizure by boats launched from Chiffonne. Onshore, the Al Qasimi and their Bedouin allies (whose numbers are unknown, but were significantly less than 20,000) formed a series of emplaced defences around the town that were protected from offshore bombardment by sandbanks that blocked the approach of Wainwright's heavier warships. On 12 November, Wainwright deployed his smaller ships close inshore to bombard the town and provide cover for his troop dispositions offshore.

At 02:00 on 13 November, two squadrons of ship's boats made amphibious landings: a small force under Lieutenant Samuel Leslie landed to the north of the emplaced positions, acting as a diversion while the main body of the expeditionary force landed to the south under Lieutenant Colonel Smith. Leslie's diversion distracted the Arab defenders, but enough remained in the southern defences to make a significant counterattack on Smith's beachhead. Cannon fire from the ship's boats covering the landing drove the Arabs back, and Smith ordered his men to advance with their bayonets fixed, pushing into the town and driving out the Arabs house by house. To cover their advance, Smith's men set fire to the buildings in their path, which created a pall of smoke under cover of which Smith was able to storm and capture the Sheik's palace.

With the harbour secure, Wainwright ordered the squadron into the bay and there burnt over 50 Al Qasimi craft, including 30 large bhagalas. Smith secured the town itself, burning warehouses and destroying the ammunition stores and fortifications around the town. The Arab forces, who had retreated after the fall of the palace, taunted the British from the surrounding hills but did not make any counterattacks. By the morning of 14 November, the operation was complete and the British force returned to their ships, having suffered light casualties of five killed and 34 wounded. Arab losses are unknown, but were probably significant, while the damage done to the Al Qasimi fleets was severe: over half of the largest and most dangerous vessels had been destroyed at Ras Al Khaimah.

=== Further operations ===
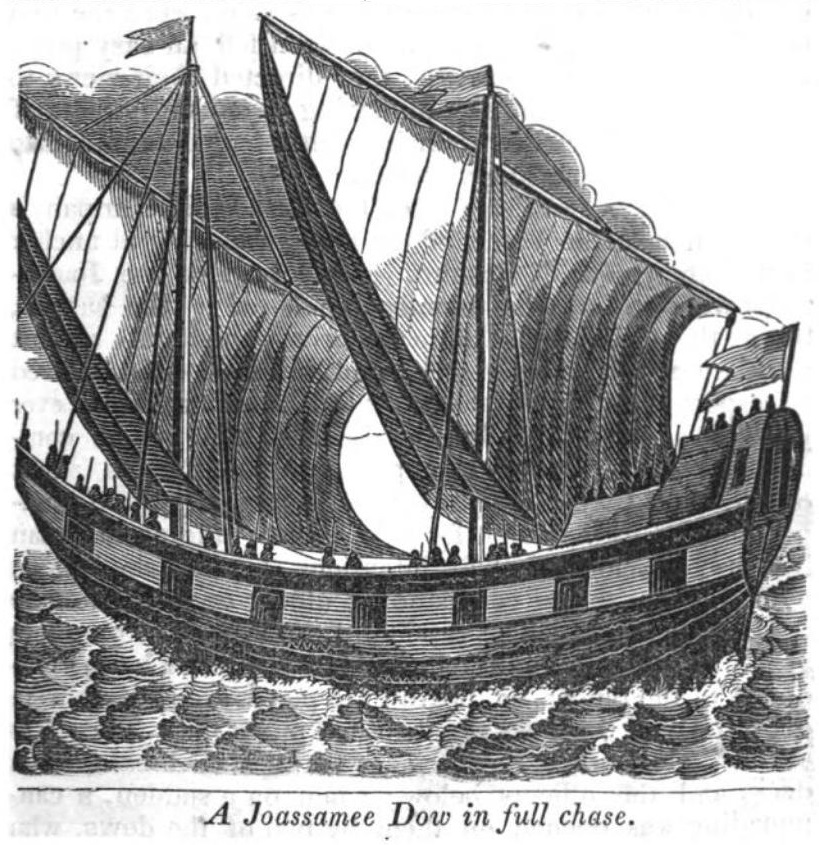
An Al Qasimi dhow in full chase.

On 17 November, Wainwright ordered an attack on the Persian town of Linga, and the inhabitants fled at the arrival of the British fleet, with Wainwright's ships burning 20 dhows without opposition or casualties. Further exploration of the southern Persian coast revealed most harbours to be empty. Wainwright's main target was Laft on Qeshm Island, a principal Al Qasimi stronghold. Sending ships to block the passages to the Qeshm Channel, Wainwright hired local pilots and descended on the town on 26 November. Following fruitless negotiations with local sheikhs, Wainwright ordered an attack on 27 November at 14:00, and Smith's troops landed unopposed. Assuming the enemy had fled, Smith's men approached the town's fortress, only to be met with heavy fire as they reached the gate. Despite heavy casualties, Smith rallied his forces and, with artillery support from the sloop Fury, forced the fort to surrender at sunset, after the sheikh was guaranteed safety. British landing parties burned 11 large Arab vessels; the expeditionary force suffered 70 casualties in the fight at the fort. Arab losses were estimated at more than 50 killed in the fort alone.

The town was handed over to Sheik Dewar, a local ruler who supported the British, and Wainwright withdrew his forces to Muscat in early December; all of the squadron reassembled there by Christmas. A final operation was launched on 3 January 1810: a successful attack against the town of Shinas, which had rebelled against Sultan Sa'id. Shinas was under Qawasim control and, its commander refusing Wainwright's call to surrender, the town was bombarded. With the population taking shelter in Shinas Fort, the bombardment then turned to that building, commencing on 2 January 1810 and consisting of 4,000 'shot and shell'. The barrage was maintained through that night and into the next day, with the defenders consistently refusing to surrender until, finally, the fort had been totally reduced and some 1,000 men lay dead.

Although minor naval operations against individual local ships continued into 1810, Wainwright and the main body of the squadron returned to Bombay in January, having considered their mission to inflict significant damage on the Al Qasimi forces in the Persian Gulf to have been a success.

== Aftermath ==
The operation succeeded in its aim of reducing French influence in Oman and in dissuading the political forces in the region from encouraging attacks on British shipping, but it was unable to totally halt Al Qasimi activity in the Persian Gulf. By 1811, when much of the Royal Navy and HEIC forces in the Indian Ocean were diverted to Java, the Al Qasimi returned in force, although their destructive actions were weaker than before and rarely strayed into the Arabian Sea. Ultimately, it was not until the forces of the Ottoman Empire seized Medina in 1812, that some measure of control could be exerted over the tribes of the Arabian peninsula. Subsequent British intervention, both military and diplomatic, also reduced the threat of attacks during the nineteenth century.

The campaign had a significant effect on British cartography of the region. Wainwright reported that the available charts of the Persian Gulf were inaccurate or incomplete, thus allowing Al Qasimi ships to hide from his squadron in uncharted inlets. The Bombay Marine had long been aware of this problem and had been developing charts of the region in the years leading up to the campaign, under David Ewen Bartholomew, who had been on Sapphire during Corbet's mission to the region and whose charts were published in 1810 as a response to these problems.

== See also ==
- Persian Gulf campaign of 1819
