= Treaty of Ghent =

1814 peace treaty ending the War of 1812

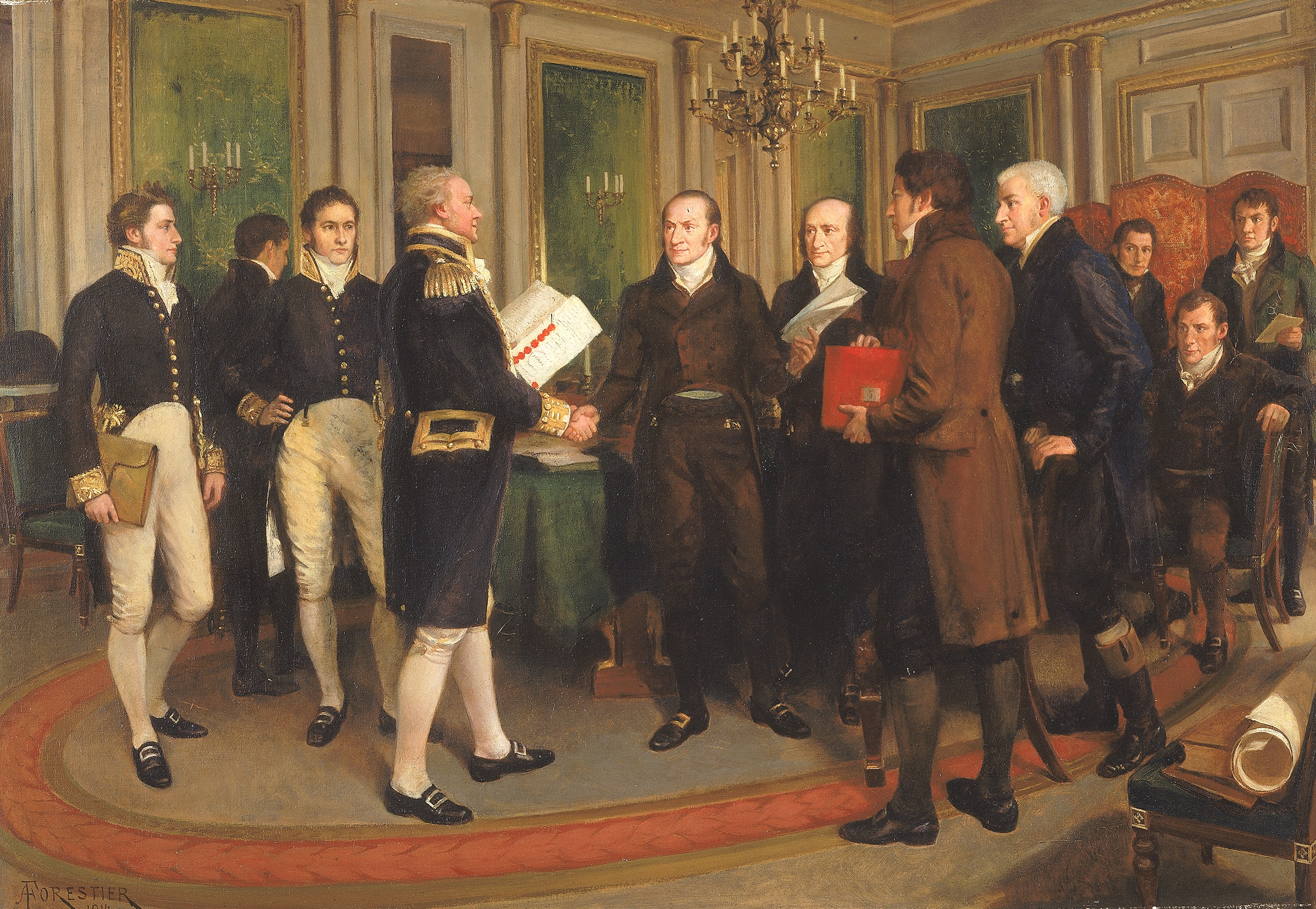
- The Signing of the Treaty of Ghent, Christmas Eve, 1814 by Charles Amédée Forestier. The leading British delegate Lord Gambier is shaking hands with the American leader John Quincy Adams. The British Undersecretary of State for War and the Colonies, Henry Goulburn, is carrying a red folder.
- Type: Bilateral peace treaty
- Signed: December 24, 1814
- Location: Ghent, Sovereign Principality of the United Netherlands
- Effective: February 17, 1815
- Signatories: (United Kingdom) Lord Gambier (United Kingdom) Henry Goulburn (United Kingdom) William Adams John Quincy Adams; James Bayard; Henry Clay; Jonathan Russell; Albert Gallatin
- Parties: United Kingdom United States

Full text
- Treaty of Ghent at Wikisource

The Treaty of Ghent (8 Stat. 218) was the peace treaty that ended the War of 1812 between the United States and the United Kingdom. It took effect in February 1815. Both sides signed it on December 24, 1814, in the city of Ghent, United Netherlands (now in Belgium). The treaty restored relations between the two parties to status quo ante bellum by restoring the pre-war borders of June 1812. (Note: The United States gained some territory (the Mobile area of what is now Alabama) from the Spanish Empire, but that was not mentioned in the treaty.) Both sides were eager to end the war. It ended when the treaty arrived in Washington and was immediately ratified unanimously by the United States Senate and exchanged with British officials the next day.

The treaty was approved by the British Parliament and signed into law by the Prince Regent (the future King George IV) on December 30, 1814. It took a month for news of the treaty to reach the United States, during which American forces under Andrew Jackson won the Battle of New Orleans on January 8, 1815. U.S. President James Madison signed the treaty and exchanged final ratified copies with the British ambassador on February 17, 1815.

The treaty began more than two centuries of peaceful relations between the United States and the United Kingdom despite a few tense moments, such as the Aroostook War in 1838–39, the Pig War in 1859, and the Trent Affair in 1861.

== Background ==
In late 1813, emperor Alexander I of Russia offered to mediate peace negotiations between the British and Americans at Saint Petersburg, but the British rejected Russian mediation and never sent a delegation. A new arrangement was made in early January 1814 to hold direct peace talks at Gothenburg in Sweden, yet the British again failed to show up for several months.

After the abdication of Napoleon in April 1814, British public opinion demanded major gains in the war against the United States. The senior American representative in London, Reuben Beasley, told US Secretary of State James Monroe:

There are so many who delight in War that I have less hope than ever of our being able to make peace. You will perceive by the newspapers that a very great force is to be sent from Bordeaux to the United States, and the order of the day is division of the States and conquest. The more moderate think that when our Seaboard is laid waste and we are made to agree to a line which shall exclude us from the lake; to give up a part of our claim on Louisiana and the privilege of fishing on the banks, etc. peace may be made with us.

However, the prime minister, Lord Liverpool, aware of growing opposition to wartime taxation and the demands of merchants in Liverpool and Bristol to reopen trade with America, realized that Britain had little to gain and much to lose from prolonged warfare. (Note: The correspondence from the Earl of Liverpool to Viscount Castlereagh dated December 23, 1814, is summarized as Anxiety to Terminate American War.)

After rejecting American proposals to broker peace negotiations, Britain reversed course in mid-1814. With the defeat of Napoleon in March–April 1814, the main British goals of stopping American trade with France and impressment of sailors from American ships were dead letters. President Madison informed Congress that the United States could no longer demand an end to impressment from the British, and he formally dropped the demand from the peace process.

== Negotiations ==
A meeting between the negotiators eventually took place in late June 1814, where it was decided to move the site of peace talks to Ghent in the Southern Netherlands. (Note: The Southern Netherlands had been known as the Austrian Netherlands until 1795, when they were annexed by the French First Republic as the neuf départements réunis ("Nine Reunited Departments"). Some pro-French revolutionaries from the short-lived United Belgian States and the Republic of Liège called themselves "Netherlanders" and "Belgians" (and Liégeois) interchangeably, and the alternate name of Belgium for this region was popularised in these decades. In early 1814, troops of the Prussian, Russian, British and other forces of the Sixth Coalition occupied all of the Low Countries, chasing away the French armies, and supporting the establishment of the Sovereign Principality of the United Netherlands by William Frederick of Orange-Nassau, son of the last stadtholder. By secret negotiations, these occupied territories were awarded to William Frederick by the Eight Articles of London on 21 July 1814, a few weeks before the American and British negotiators arrived there in Ghent.) The Americans sent five commissioners: John Quincy Adams, Henry Clay, James A. Bayard, Sr., Jonathan Russell, and Albert Gallatin. All were senior political leaders except Russell; Adams was in charge. The British sent minor officials, who kept in close touch with their superiors in London. The British commissioners Gambier, Goulburn, Adams and Baker arrived in Ghent on 7 August 1814, and the first formal meeting with the American plenipotentiaries began the next day at 1 p.m. The British government's main diplomatic focus in 1814 was not ending the war in North America, but the European balance of power after the apparent defeat of Napoleonic France and the return to power in Paris of the pro-British Bourbons.

As the peace talks opened, American diplomats decided not to present President Madison's demands for the end of impressment, or his suggestion for Britain to turn Canada over to the United States. They were quiet, so the British instead opened with their demands, the most important of which was the creation of an Indigenous state in the former Canadian southwest territory (the area from present-day Ohio to Wisconsin). It was understood that the British would sponsor the Indigenous state. For decades, the British strategy had been to create a buffer state to block American expansion. The Americans refused to consider a buffer state or to include Indigenous nations directly in the treaty in any fashion. Henry Goulburn, a British negotiator who took part in the treaty negotiations, remarked after meeting with American negotiators that "I had, till I came here, had no idea of the fixed determination which prevails in the breast of every American to extirpate the Indians and appropriate their territory." Adams argued that there was no precedent for including allied Indigenous nations in bilateral peace treaties and to do so would in effect mean the United States was abandoning its sovereign claims over Indigenous territories, especially under a foreign protectorate such as Britain. In doing so, Adams articulated a strong imperial claim of sovereignty over all peoples living within the boundaries of the United States. The British negotiators presented the barrier state as a sine qua non for peace, and the impasse brought negotiations to the brink of breakdown. In the end, the British government backed down and accepted Article IX, in which both governments promised to make peace with their indigenous foes and to restore Indigenous nations to "all possessions, rights and privileges which they may have enjoyed, or been entitled to in 1811."

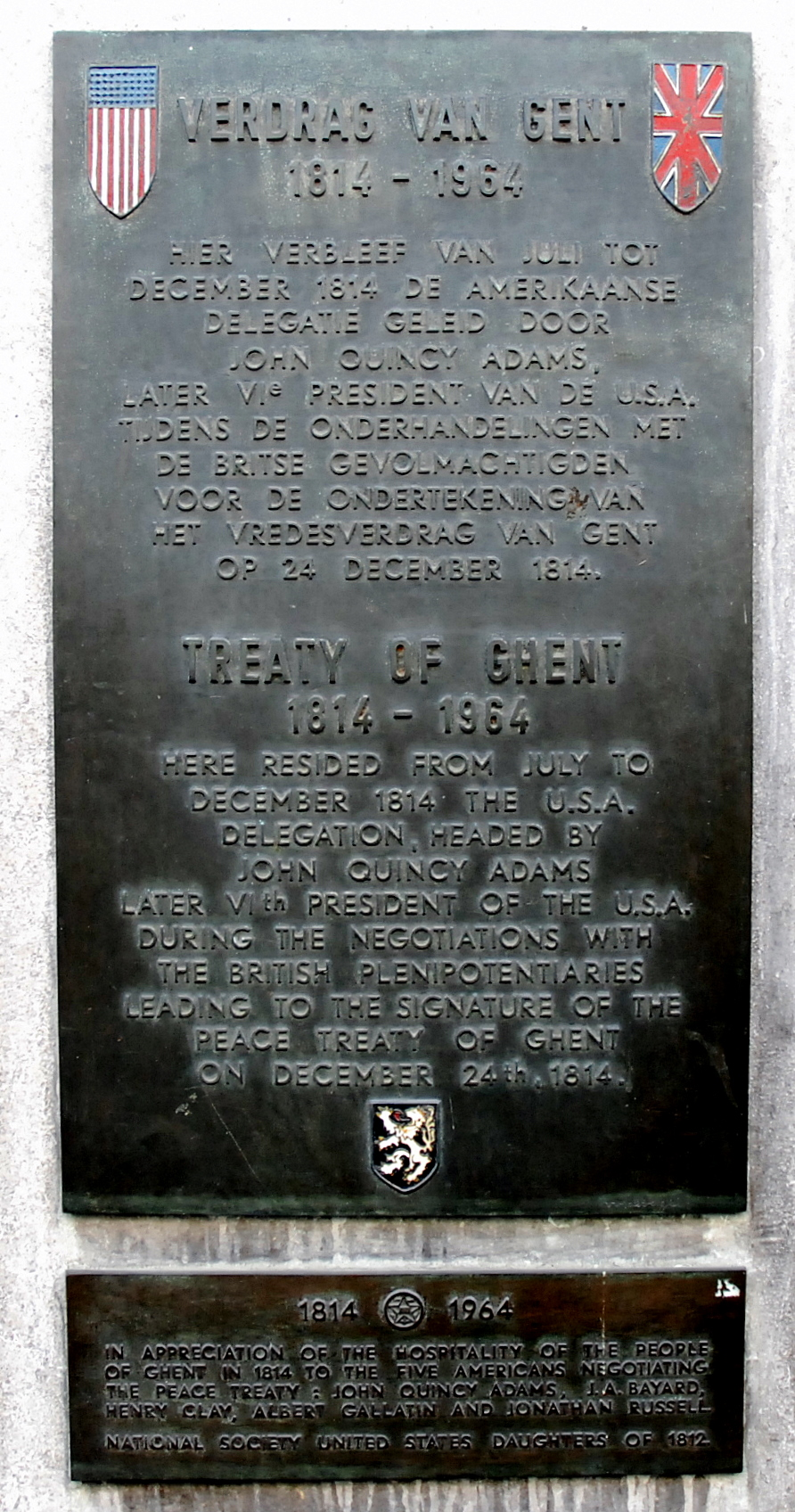
Plaque at a building in Veldstraat, Ghent, where the American diplomats stayed and one of the locations where the treaty was negotiated. It was located at an Esprit retail store on Veldstraat 47 and placed by the United States Daughters of 1812.

The British, assuming their planned invasion of New York State would go well, also demanded that Americans not keep any naval forces on the Great Lakes and that the British have certain transit rights to the Mississippi River in exchange for continuation of American fishing rights in the seas around Newfoundland. The United States rejected the demands, and there was an impasse. American public opinion was so outraged when Madison published the demands that even the Federalists were willing to fight on.

During the negotiations, the British had four invasions underway. One force carried out a burning of Washington, but the main mission failed in its goal of capturing Baltimore. The British fleet sailed away when the army commander was killed. A small force invaded the District of Maine from New Brunswick, capturing parts of northeastern Maine and several smuggling towns on the seacoast; and re-established the New Ireland colony with the ultimate purpose of incorporating Maine into Canada. Much more important were two major invasions. In northern New York State, 10,000 British troops marched south to cut off New England until a decisive defeat at the Battle of Plattsburgh forced them back to Canada. Nothing was known at the time of the fate of the other major invasion force that had been sent to capture New Orleans and control the Mississippi River.

The British prime minister, Lord Liverpool, wanted the Duke of Wellington to go to command in Canada with the assignment of winning the war. Wellington replied that he would go to America but believed that he was needed in Europe. He also stated:

I think you have no right, from the state of war, to demand any concession of territory from America... You have not been able to carry it into the enemy's territory, notwithstanding your military success, and now undoubted military superiority, and have not even cleared your own territory on the point of attack. You cannot on any principle of equality in negotiation claim a cession of territory except in exchange for other advantages which you have in your power... Then if this reasoning be true, why stipulate for the uti possidetis? You can get no territory: indeed, the state of your military operations, however creditable, does not entitle you to demand any.

The government had no choice but to agree with Wellington. Lord Liverpool informed the Foreign Secretary, Lord Castlereagh, who was at Vienna: "I think we have determined, if all other points can be satisfactorily settled, not to continue the war for the purpose of obtaining or securing any acquisition of territory." Liverpool cited several reasons, especially the unsatisfactory negotiations underway at Vienna, the alarming reports from France that it might resume the war, and the weak financial condition of the government. He did not need to tell Castlereagh that the war was very unpopular and that Britons wanted peace and a return to normal trade. The war with America had ruined many reputations and promised no gain.

After months of negotiations, against the background of changing military victories, defeats, and losses, the parties finally realized that their nations wanted peace and that there was no real reason to continue the war. Each side was tired of the war since export trade was all but paralyzed, and after the fall of Napoleon in 1814, France was no longer an enemy of Britain, so the Royal Navy no longer needed to stop American shipments to France, nor did it need more seamen. The British were preoccupied in rebuilding Europe after the apparent final defeat of Napoleon. Liverpool told British negotiators to offer a status quo. That was what the British government had desired since the start of the war and was offered by British diplomats immediately to the US negotiators, who dropped demands for an end to British maritime practices and Canadian territory, ignored their war aims, and agreed to the terms. Both sides would exchange prisoners, and Britain would return all slaves that they had freed from their American enslavers or offer financial compensation instead.

== Agreement ==
On December 24, 1814, the members of the British and American negotiating teams signed and affixed their individual seals to the document. That did not itself end the war, which required formal ratification of the treaty by both governments, which came in February 1815.

The signing of the treaty took place in the mirror room at the site of the former Carthusian monastery, the Charterhouse of Sint-Bruno in Eremo, a textile mill and luxury home of Lieven Bauwens. The location was where the British plenipotentiaries were staying in Ghent.

The treaty released all prisoners and restored all captured lands and ships between the United States and Britain (Mobile and Spanish West Florida territory west of the Perdido River were not returned to Spain – which had allied with Britain and the Red Stick faction of the Muscogee in the War of 1812 – by the United States). Returned to the United States were approximately 10,000,000 acres (4,000,000 ha; 40,000 km^{2}) of territory near lakes Superior and Michigan and in Maine. American-held areas of Upper Canada (now Ontario) were returned to British control, but the Americans only returned Pensacola to Spanish Florida. All of Spanish West Florida west of the Perdido River, including the important port of Mobile, was occupied by the Americans in 1813, but the Treaty of Ghent did not force the Americans to leave this section of West Florida. The treaty made no changes to the prewar boundaries on the U.S.-Canada border.

The British promised to return all freed slaves that they had liberated during the war back to the United States. However, in 1826, Britain instead paid the U.S. government US$1,204,960 (equivalent to $34,288,200 in 2025) to compensate American slaveholders. Both nations also promised to work towards the abolition of the Atlantic slave trade.

The negotiations in Ghent were concluded in 1814, in anticipation that the two governments would pursue further discussions in 1815 to frame a new commercial agreement between the United States and the British Empire.

Pierre Berton wrote of the treaty:

It was as if no war had been fought, or to put it more bluntly, as if the war that was fought was fought for no good reason. For nothing has changed; everything is as it was at the beginning save for the graves of those who, it now appears, have fought for a trifle [...]. Lake Erie and Fort McHenry will go into the American history books, Queenston Heights and Crysler's Farm into the Canadian, but without the gore, the stench, the disease, the terror, the conniving, and the imbecilities that march with every army.

== Aftermath ==
In the century of peace between both countries that followed from 1815 to World War I, several more territorial and diplomatic disputes arose, but all were resolved peacefully, sometimes by arbitration.

The course of the war resolved one major original issue for the Americans. Most Indigenous nations had allied with the British but had been defeated, allowing the United States to continue its expansion westward. On the other hand Britain maintained its maritime rights with no mention of impressment in the treaty, a key victory for them.

James Carr argues that Britain negotiated the Treaty of Ghent with the goal of ending the war but knew that a major British expedition had been ordered to seize New Orleans. Carr says that Britain had no intention of repudiating the treaty and continuing the war if it had won the battle.

The arrival of the treaty at the Foreign Office on December 26 was announced in The London Gazette the following day. It was also ratified by Prince George as regent, at his London residence Carlton House on the same day, December 27, 1814.

HMS Favorite conveyed two diplomats, one British and one American, to North America, (Note: Mr. Baker left for Plymouth... with the Treaty of Peace, which he carries out to the American Government, for ratification. He was accompanied by Mr. Carroll, Secretary to Mr. Clay, one of the American Commissioners... They sail immediately from Plymouth, in the Favourite sloop of war, which is considered a fast sailing vessel.) departing Plymouth, Devon on January 2. (Note: Plymouth, 2 January 1815. Favorite SW with dispatches sailed for America.) (Note: Plymouth, Jan 2nd. Sailed Brazen, Favorite and Insolent, to the westward.) She brought back the ratification by the United States Senate (dated February 17, 1815), which arrived at the Foreign Office on March 13, 1815. News of the treaty finally reached the United States soon after it had won a major victory in the Battle of New Orleans, and the treaty won immediate wide approval from all sides.

Also departing Plymouth the same day as Favorite was HMS Brazen, which arrived off Fort Bowyer near Mobile on February 13, carrying news that the Treaty of Ghent had been signed on the previous Christmas Eve. On March 2 HMS Kangaroo arrived at Halifax, Nova Scotia with dispatches, which announced the end of the war, (Note: The Prince Regent assented to the Treaty of Peace with America... dispatches having been forwarded, with instructions to our Commanders in consequence of the event. These instructions went off in the Brazen, Capt. Stirling, and Kangaroo, Capt. Hall.) and a cartel schooner. (Note: Halifax. 2 March, arrived from Portsmouth Kangaroo SW with the Treaty of Peace, out 62 days, Lingen Cartel with the ratified Treaty of Peace. 16 March, Kangaroo SW sailed for Gibraltar.)

Favorite arrived in New York Harbour on February 11, its diplomats disembarking at 8pm. An express rider named Christopher Hughes was immediately expedited to Washington with the American unratified copy of the treaty. The US Senate unanimously approved the treaty on February 16, 1815, and President Madison exchanged ratification papers with a British diplomat in Washington on February 17. The treaty was proclaimed on February 18.

The Daily National Intelligencer announced the United States' ratification of the Treaty of Ghent on February 23, 1815.

== Memorials ==
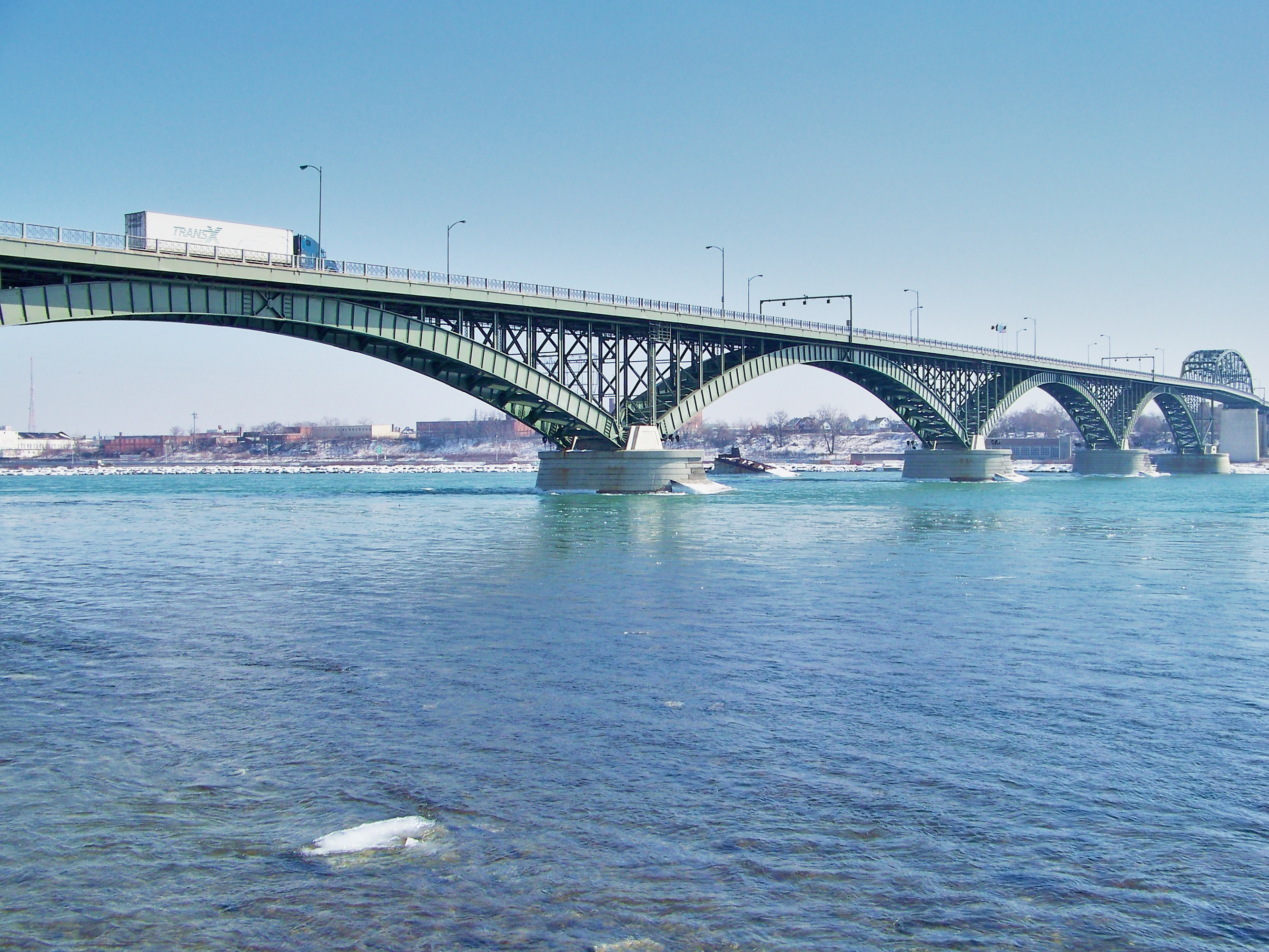
The Peace Bridge between New York and Ontario

The Peace Arch, dedicated in September 1921, stands 20.5 metres (67 ft) tall at the Douglas–Blaine border crossing between the province of British Columbia and the state of Washington. The monument represents a perpetually open gate across the Canada–U.S. boundary. In 1922, the Fountain of Time was dedicated in Washington Park, Chicago, commemorating 110 years of peace between the United States and Britain. The Peace Bridge between Buffalo, New York, and Fort Erie, Ontario, opened in 1927 to commemorate more than a century of peace between the United States and Canada.

Perry's Victory and International Peace Memorial (1936) commemorates the Battle of Lake Erie that took place near Ohio's South Bass Island, in which Commodore Oliver Hazard Perry led a fleet to victory in one of the most significant naval battles to occur in the War of 1812. Located on an isthmus on the island, the memorial also celebrates the lasting peace between Britain, Canada, and the United States that followed the war.

== See also ==
- Anthony St. John Baker
- List of treaties
- Results of the War of 1812
- Timeline of United States diplomatic history
