= Chesapeake Bay Flotilla =

Coordinates: 38.103°N 76.446°W

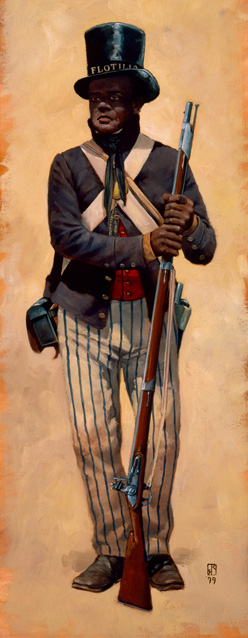
- Charles Ball wearing the uniform of the Chesapeake Bay Flotilla.
- Active: 1813-1815
- Country: United States
- Allegiance: United States
- Branch: U.S. Navy
- Role: Artillery
- Size: 4,370 men (with an additional 700 U.S. marines attached to naval force)
- Part of: U.S. Department of the Navy
- Engagements: War of 1812: Battle of St. Jerome Creek (1814); Battle of St. Leonard's Creek (1814); Battle of Queen Anne (1814); Battle of Bladensburg (1814); Battle of Baltimore (1814)

Commanders
- Notable commanders: Commodore Joshua Barney

The Chesapeake Bay Flotilla was a motley collection of barges and gunboats that the United States assembled under the command of Joshua Barney, an 1812 privateer captain, to stall British attacks in the Chesapeake Bay which came to be known as the "Chesapeake campaign" during the War of 1812. The Flotilla engaged the Royal Navy in several inconclusive battles before Barney was forced to scuttle the vessels themselves on August 22, 1814. The men of the Flotilla then served onshore in the defense of Washington, DC and Baltimore. It was disbanded on February 15, 1815, after the end of the war.

== Formation ==
Joshua Barney submitted a plan for the defense of the Chesapeake Bay to Secretary of the Navy William Jones on 4 July 1813. He estimated that a force consisting of gunboats and barges that could be sailed or rowed, manned by sailors and those in the shipbuilding industries, could engage British landing parties in the shallow waters of the Bay. He set sail in April 1814 with these eighteen ships: seven 75-foot (23 m) barges, six 50-foot (15 m) barges, two gunboats, one row-galley, one lookout boat and his flagship, the 49-foot (15 m) sloop-rigged, self-propelled floating battery USS Scorpion, mounting two long guns and two carronades.

== Flotillamen crews ==
The Flotillamen, totaling 4,370 men at their largest, were motley crews composed mainly of U.S. Navy sailors, merchant seamen, Chesapeake Bay watermen, privateers, free negros, and runaway slaves. Later, when they became shipless and on the march, from Benedict, Maryland, a battalion of 700 marines from the Washington Navy Yard, would join them, as they moved north to defend the Capital and make an abortive stand at Bladensburg, against the rapid British advance.

== Operations ==
=== Battle of St. Jerome Creek ===
On June 1, 1814, Barney's flotilla, led by Scorpion, were coming down Chesapeake Bay when it encountered the 12-gun schooner HMS St Lawrence (the former Baltimore privateer Atlas), and boats from the 74-gun Third Rates HMS Dragon and HMS Albion near St. Jerome Creek. The flotilla pursued St Lawrence and the boats until they reached the protection of the two 74s. The American flotilla then retreated into the Patuxent River, which the British quickly blockaded. The British outnumbered Barney by 7:1, forcing the flotilla on June 7 to retreat into St. Leonard's Creek. Two British frigates, the 38-gun Loire and the 32-gun Narcissus, plus the 18-gun sloop-of-war HMS Jasseur, blockaded the mouth of the creek. The creek was too shallow for the British warships to enter; the flotilla outgunned, and hence was able to fend off, the boats from the British ships.

Battles continued through June 10. British commander Robert Barrie, noting that his men were unable to flush out Barney, proceeded to order several raids on nearby Maryland settlements to flush him out; these raids targeted the settlements of Calverton, Huntingtown, Prince Frederick, Benedict and Lower Marlboro. Among the British units that participated in the campaign were a battalion of Royal Marines and the Corps of Colonial Marines, a unit consisting of self-emancipated Black Americans who had fled their American enslavers and joined the British.

=== Battle of St. Leonard's Creek ===
On June 26, after the arrival of troops commanded by U.S. Army Colonel Decius Wadsworth, and U.S. Marine Captain Samuel Miller, Barney attempted a breakout. A simultaneous attack from land and sea on the blockading frigates at the mouth of St. Leonard's creek allowed the flotilla to move out of the creek and up-river to Benedict, Maryland, though Barney had to scuttle gunboats 137 and 138 in the creek. The British entered the then-abandoned creek and burned the town of St. Leonard, Maryland.

The British, under the command of Admiral Sir Alexander Cochrane, moved up the Patuxent, preparing for a landing at Benedict, Maryland. For several days the British fleet bombarded the Flotilla with cannon and congreve rockets in an attempt to destroy it. August 11, 1814, the Flotilla left St. Leonard's Creek and sailed north up the Patuxent River. A plan had been discussed to transport the entire Flotilla overland from the port of Queen Anne to the South River and return it to the Bay. However, concerned that the Flotilla would fall into British hands, Secretary of the Navy Jones ordered Barney to take his squadron as far up the Patuxent as possible, to Queen Anne, and scuttle the vessels should the British appear. On 22 August the British approached the Flotilla, and Barney ordered its destruction. He then force-marched the men from the flotilla and such cannons as were movable, to Washington D.C. where they were to join the Battle of Bladensburg.

Three active battalions of the Regular Army (1-4 Inf, 2-4 Inf and 3-4 Inf) perpetuate the lineages of the old 36th and 38th Infantry Regiments, both of which had elements that participated in the Battle of St. Leonard's Creek.

=== Battle of Queen Anne ===
On August 22, the British attempted to capture Barney's squadron at Queen Anne. In his report of the affair, the tactical commander, Admiral Sir George Cockburn wrote:

as we opened the reach above Pig Point, I plainly discovered Commodore Barney's broad pendant in the headmost vessel, a large sloop and the remainder of the flotilla extending in a long line astern of her. Our boats now advanced towards them as rapidly as possible, but on nearing them, we observed the sloop bearing the broad pendant to be on fire, and she very soon afterwards blew up. I now saw clearly that they were all abandoned and on fire with trains to their magazines, and out of the seventeen vessels which composed this formidable and so much vaunted flotilla sixteen were in quick succession blown to atoms, and the seventeenth, in which the fire had not taken, were captured. The commodore's sloop was a large armed vessel, the others were gun boats all having a long gun in the bow and a carronade in the stern, but the calibre of the guns and the number of the crew of each differed in proportion to the size of the boat, varying from 32 pdrs. and 60 men, to 18 pdrs. and 40 men. I found here laying above the flotilla under its protection, thirteen merchant schooners, some of which not being worth bringing away I caused to be burnt, such as were in good condition, I directed to be moved to Pig Point. Whilst employed taking these vessels a few shots were fired at us by some of the men of the flotilla from the bushes on the shore near us, but Lieutenant Scott whom I had landed for that purpose, soon got hold of them and made them prisoners. Some horsemen likewise shewed themselves on the neighbouring heights, but a rocket or two depended them without resistance. Now spreading his men across the country the enemy retreated to a distance and left us in quiet possession of the town, the neighbourhood and our prizes.

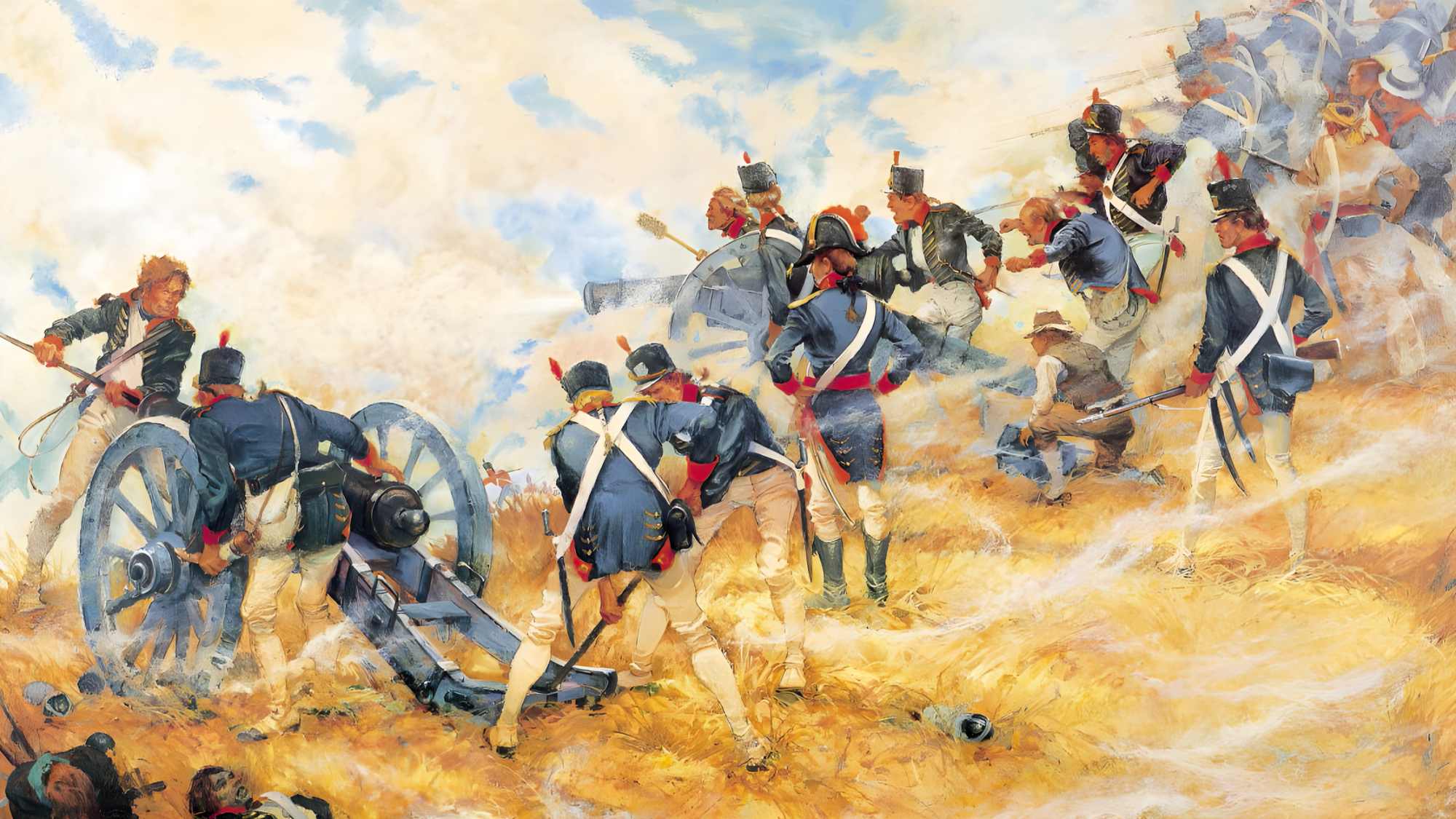
U.S. Marines alongside sailors manning the cannons on August 23, 1814 at Bladensburg, from the Washington Navy Yard were attached to the Chesapeake Bay Flotilla to protect the flank of the naval force

=== Battle of Bladensburg ===
On August 24, Barney and the flotilla participated in the Battle of Bladensburg. The Flotilla stood their ground and the British suffered heavy casualties at the hands of Barney's cannoneers. Barney received a serious wound to his thigh from a musket ball and since they were about to be overwhelmed by British regulars, ordered the Flotilla to retreat. The Flotilla, along with the United States Marines from the Marine Corps Barracks at 8th and I Streets in Washington, D.C., commanded by Lt. Miller, were the last two American units to leave the battlefield. The 1814 Register of Patients at the Naval Hospital Washington, provides a unique glimpse of the aftermath of battle and a record of the lives of individual sailors, marines, soldiers, and civilians many who were part of the Chesapeake Bay Flotilla, from their admission to discharge. The Register, covers the period 2 June to 30 December 1814, is one of our most important primary sources for the names and units of American casualties at Bladensburg, see thumbnail.

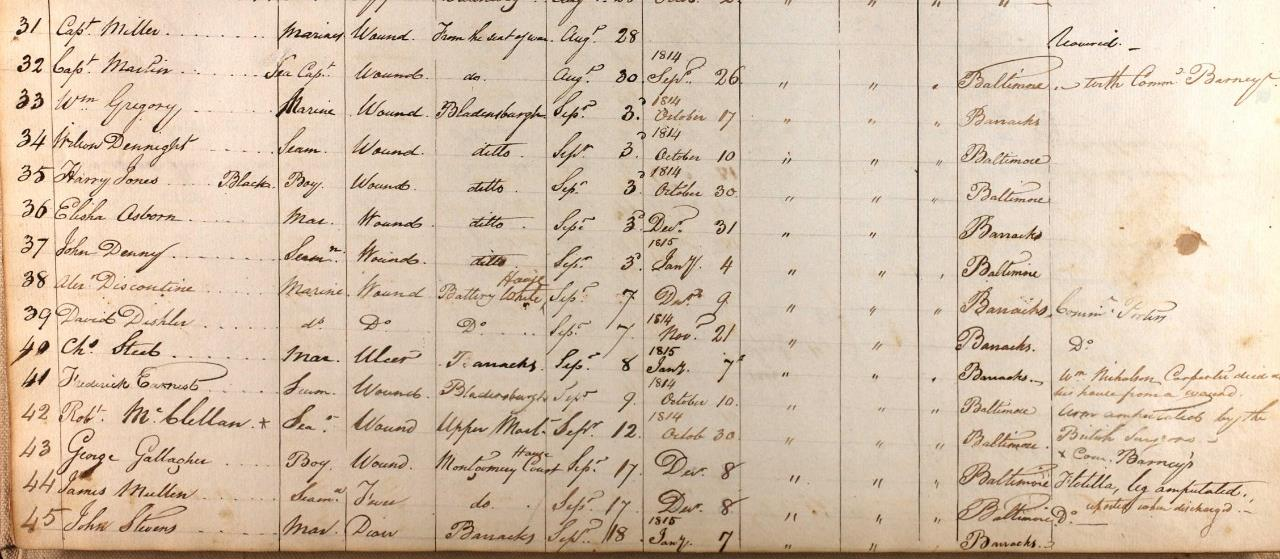
1814 Naval Hospital Register, Washington D.C. patients 31-45, from injured marines and sailors from Commodore Joshua Barney's, Chesapeake Flotilla

=== Battle of Baltimore ===
Approximately 500 of the flotilla men then marched to Baltimore, joining others there, and were assigned to the U.S. Naval Command Second Regiment. They manned the following posts in the defense of Baltimore:

| Position | Officer in Command | Men at Position |
|---|---|---|
| Battery Babcock | Sailing Master John Webster | 50 Men |
| Gun Barges | Lt. Solomon Rutter | 338 Men |
| Lazaretto Battery | Lt. Solomon Frazier | 45 Men |
| Ft Mchenry Water Battery | Solomon Rodman | 60 Men |
| Lazaretto Barracks | ------- | 114 Men |

The Flotilla manned these positions throughout the Battle of Baltimore, pitting sailor against sailor in fighting the British Fleet. The Flotilla inflicted numerous casualties on the attacking British ships, especially during the attempted night assault on Battery Babcock by a Royal Marine landing party. Lt. Col. David Harris reported that Charles Messenger was killed in action at the Water Battery, and three other flotilla men wounded.

== Flotilla disbanded ==
After the Battle of Baltimore, the Flotilla did not participate in any further engagements. On February 15, 1815, Congress repealed the short lived Flotilla Act, and the Chesapeake Bay Flotilla was officially disbanded.

== Archeology ==
In 1978, a survey of the upper Patuxent River using a proton precession magnetometer located the fleet. Further study of the wrecks, including one vessel dubbed the Turtle Shell Wreck', followed in 1979. The Turtle Shell was lying in the main river channel near Wayson's Corner, and covered by five feet of mud, the ship was well preserved, although it appeared the bow was torn off in an explosion.

When the new Route 4 Hills Bridge was built in 1990, remnants of Barney's ships were found buried more than five feet below the riverbed.

A replica of one of Joshua Barney's gunboats today sits at the Bladensburg Waterfront Park.

== Honors ==
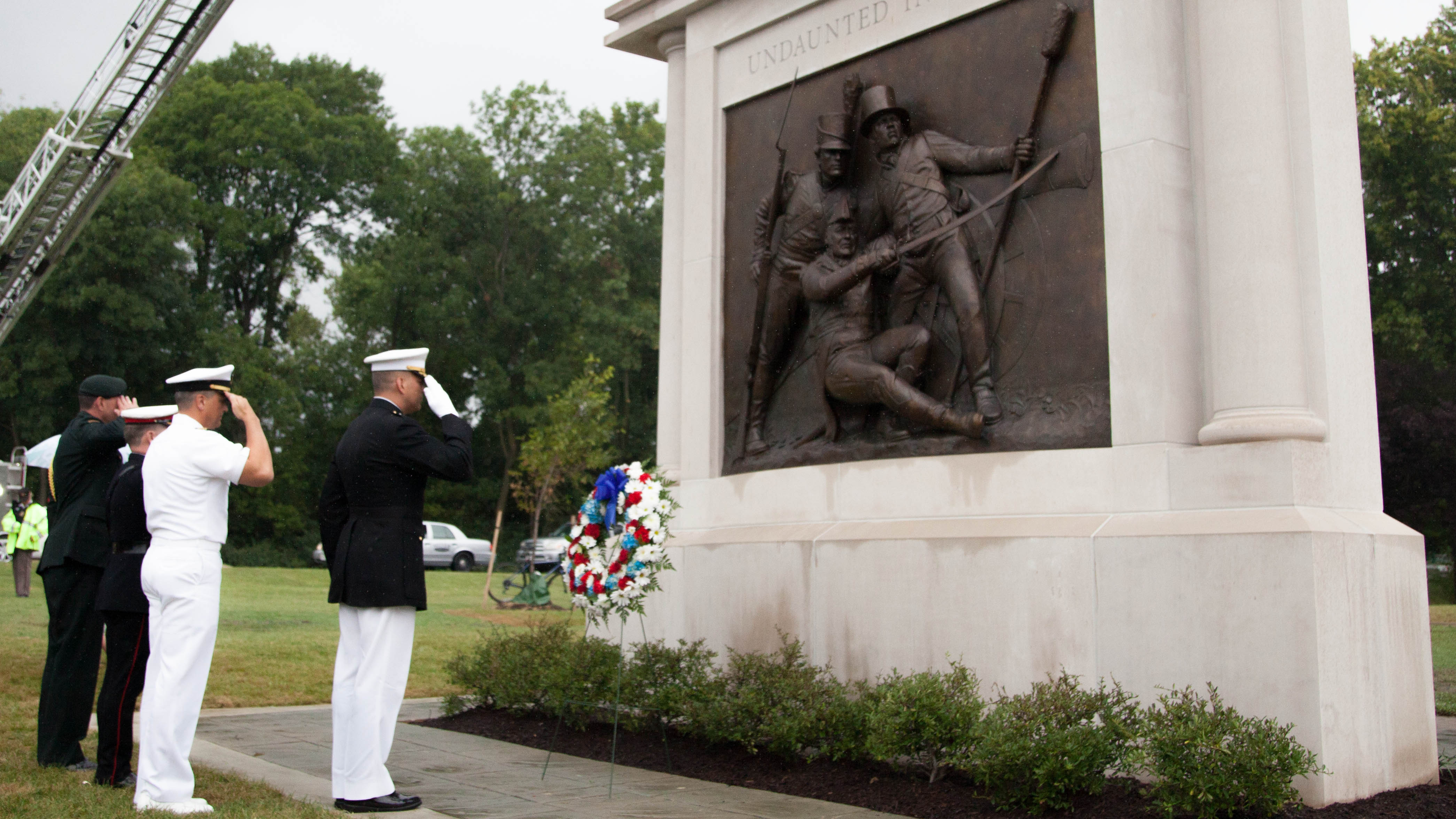
U.S. Navy Honor Guard salute during August 23, 2014 dedication of official Battle Of Bladensburg Memorial by the State of Maryland, with the bronze relief sculpture showing a wounded Commodore Joshua Barney fighting alongside an unidentified marine and Flotilla sailor, Charles Ball

== See also ==
- Brown water navy
- Small unit riverine craft
- Special Boat Service
- Special Operations Craft – Riverine (SOC-R)
- Special warfare combatant-craft crewmen
- River gunboat
- United States Naval Special Warfare Command
- Yangtze Patrol
