= Lulwah Al Mansouri =

Lulwa Ahmed Al Mansouri
- Born: November 21, 1979 (age 46)
- Occupation: Award writer: 1. Emirates Award for Fiction 2. Fayrouz Friday Award; 3. Dubai Cultural Award for Creativity

Lulwa Ahmed Al-Mansoori (born November 21, 1979) is a researcher and novelist from Julphar in Ras Al Khaimah, United Arab Emirates. Member of the Emirates Writers Union Board of Directors - responsible for publishing and distribution. She obtained a Bachelor's degree in Arabic literature, a diploma in cultural heritage management, and a certificate in restoring documents and manuscripts.

== Novels ==
• “Aakher Nisaa Lanjaa” (The Last Women of Linh) a short story published by the Department of Culture and Information, Sharjah

• “Kharajna Min Dile Jabal” (We came out of the mountainside) published by the Arab House of Science Publishers, Beirut

• “Kaws Alramil (Mulhat Albahru Wa Almaa)” (Arc al-Raml (The Comedy of Cradle and Water)) published by Dar Al-Ain for Publishing, Cairo

== Story collections ==
- “Kabur Tahta Raasi” (A grave under my head) a short story published by the Department of Culture and Information, Sharjah
- “Alkariya Allati Tanamu Fi Jaibi” (The Village That Sleeps in My Pocket) by Kuttab Publication, Dubai

== Awards ==
- Lulwa Al-Mansoori has won several awards, including:
- The short story collection "The Village That Sleeps in My Pocket" won the Dubai Cultural Award for the year 2013
- The novel "We Got Out of a Jabal Ridge" won the 2014 Emirates Prize for Fiction
- She won first place for the short story collection "A Tomb Under My Head" at the Sharjah Prize for Arab Creativity for the year 2014
- The story (A Very Deep White Darkness) won the Juma Al Fayrouz Award for Short Story in 2015

== Memberships ==
- Member of the Emirates Writers Union
- Member of the Emirates Women Writers Association
- Member of the editorial board of (House of Narration) magazine
- Member of the International Prize for Arabic Fiction Symposium 2013
