= Ras Al Khaimah Academy =

- Ras Al Khaimah; UAE

Information
- Type: Private
- Motto: "A Centre of Excellence at the heart of the Community"
- Established: 1975
- Executive Principal: Graham Beale
- Gender: Co-educational
- Enrollment: 3200+
- Language: English

Ras Al Khaimah Academy, or RAKA for short, is a co-educational school located in Ras al-Khaimah, United Arab Emirates. It was founded in 1975 as the Ras Al Khaimah English Speaking School and is supported and owned by His Highness Sheikh Saud bin Saqr Al-Qassimi. The school operates under an executive principal who reports to an appointed board of governors consisting of parents, past parents, and community leaders. There are 104 nationalities represented in the student body and nearly 30 nationalities amongst the teaching and support staff. The school is accredited by EdExcel, University of Cambridge International Examinations, The Council of International Schools, British Schools in the Middle East, and the International Baccalaureate. Currently there are over 1000 students enrolled.

The school is organized into five campuses: RAK Academy International Primary School (IPK), RAK Academy British School Khuzam (BSK), RAK Academy British School Al Hamra (BSH), RAK Academy British School Al Rams (BSR) and RAK Academy International Secondary School(ISK).

== Secondary campus ==
In Grades 6 and 7 and 8, a modified version of the English National Curriculum of England and Wales is used. Students take the Cambridge Checkpoint Examinations (replacing the SATS) in Mathematics, English and Science at the end of Grade 8. In Grade 9 and 10, students study IGCSE courses and are entered for the final examinations at the end of Grade 10. In Grade 11 and 12, students may choose the IB Program or A Levels.
