= Subash Gautam =

Indian medical researcher

Subash C Gautam

Subash C Gautam is an Indian doctor and medical researcher, and the founder and director of the Advanced Trauma Life Support (ATLS) programme in the United Arab Emirates. He has led the programme since 2004. Gautam received the ATLS International Award, for his services to the development of the ATLS Programme in the Middle East and Africa. Through ATLS, he has worked to improve emergency and trauma services in India, Pakistan, Nigeria, Lebanon, Syria and Oman.

== Medical career ==
Gautam started laparoscopic surgery in April 1992. He received an award for Best Original Article from the Emirates Medical Journal, and has published regularly since then in various national and international journals.

Gautam is head of surgery at Fujairah Hospital, UAE; clinical vice-dean and professor of surgery at Ras Al Khaimah Medical and Health Sciences University; and associate professor (adjunct) at the Faculty of Medicine and Health Sciences, Al Ain University. He is a member of the international advisory board of the ATLS Programme India, and director and co-ordinator of the PHTLS programme.
