= Mohammed bin Saud Al Qasimi =

Crown Prince of Ras Al Khaimah

Mohammed bin Saud Al Qasimi محمد بن سعود القاسمي
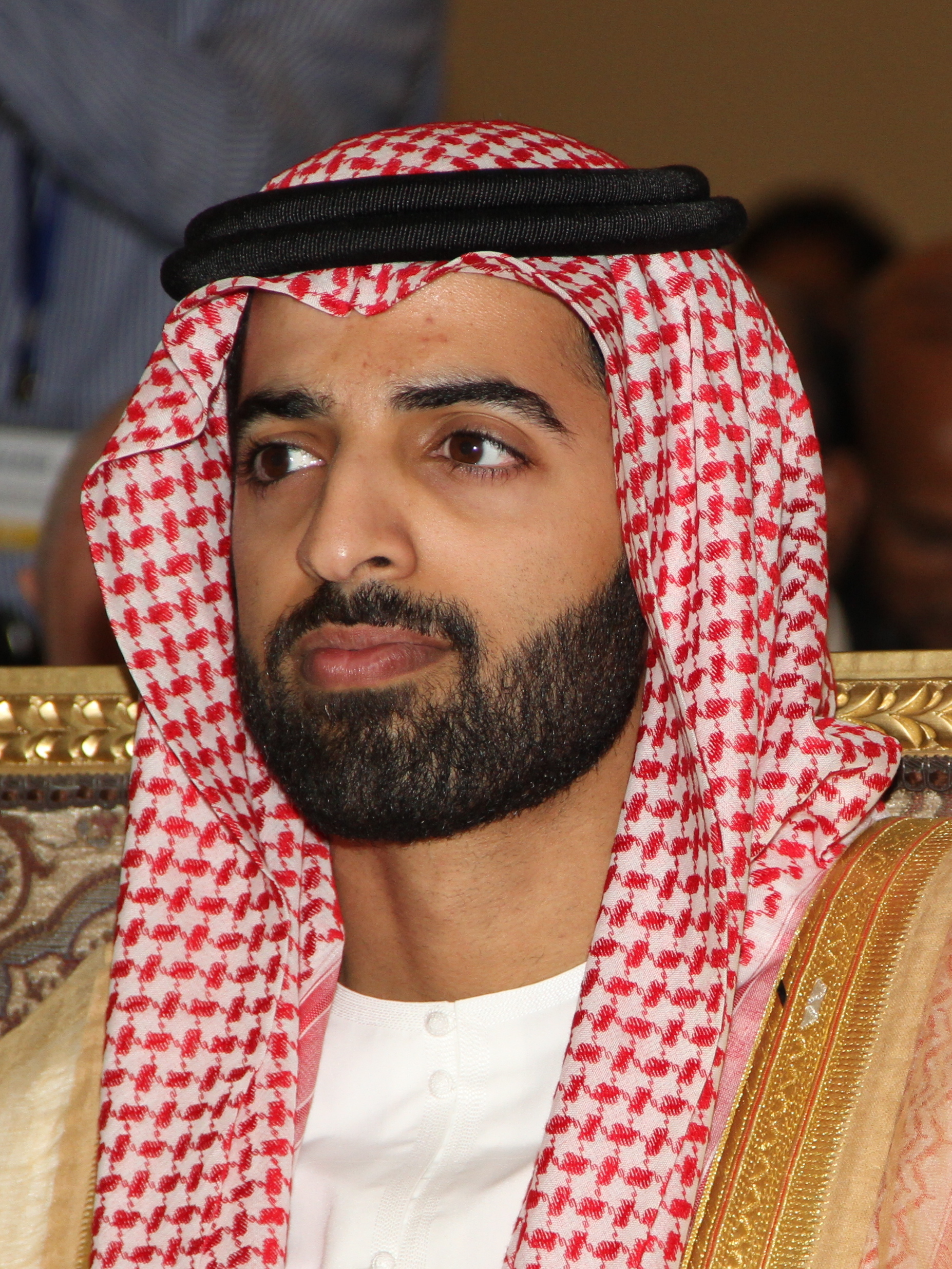
- Sheikh Mohammed in 2012

Crown Prince of Ras Al Khaimah
- Tenure: 6 December 2010 – present
- Monarch: Saud bin Saqr Al Qasimi
- Predecessor: Saud bin Saqr Al Qasimi
- Born: 9 February 1987 (age 39); Ras Al Khaimah, UAE
- Spouse: Shaikha bint Butti bin Maktoum Al Maktoum (m. 2018)
- Issue: 4
- House: Al Qasimi
- Father: Saud bin Saqr Al Qasimi
- Mother: Hana bint Juma Al Majid

Sheikh Mohammed bin Saud bin Saqr Al Qasimi (Arabic: محمد بن سعود بن صقر القاسمي, romanized: Muḥammad bin Saʿūd bin Ṣaqr al-Qāsimī; 9 February 1987) is the Crown Prince of the Emirate of Ras Al Khaimah in the United Arab Emirates and the former chairman of RAK Ceramics.

== Biography ==
Born on 9 February 1987 to Sheikh Saud bin Saqr Al Qasimi and mother Hana bint Juma Al Majid, he studied at a British curriculum-based school in Ras Al-Khaimah and graduated from University of California in Los Angeles. He holds a BA in Political Science.

After returning from the United States in 2009, he joined the Ras Al Khaimah Ruler's Court and began helping his father in supervising the workflow in government departments and bodies in Ras Al Khaimah. He played a guiding role in supporting many initiatives aimed at enhancing government performance, competition and transparency. He also supervised the implementation of the Mohammed bin Saud Program for the Rehabilitation of Housing which covered the low-populated villages in the mountainous areas of Ras Al Khaimah and provided easy access to clean water and other important services.

== Personal life ==
Sheikh Mohammed married Sheikha Shaikha bint Butti bin Maktoum Al Maktoum in 2018. Shaikha is a granddaughter of late Sheikh Rashid bin Ahmad Al Mualla II, former ruler of Umm Al Quwain and a niece of Sheikha Hind bint Maktoum Al Maktoum, consort of Sheikh Mohammed bin Rashid Al Maktoum, ruler of Dubai. The couple have four children.
