= Indian Public High School =

Location
- Al Nakheel, Ras Al Khaimah; United Arab Emirates
- Coordinates: 25.79029°N 55.98684°E

Information
- Type: Private
- Motto: Wisdom Is Better Than Riches
- Established: 1986
- Founder: John Valiyaveetil
- Principal: Mrs. Jisha jayan
- Affiliation: Central Board of Secondary Education (CBSE)
- Website: www.iphsrak.com

The Indian Public High School (IPHS) as a coeducational school located in Al Nakheel, Ras Al Khaimah, United Arab Emirates.

The school was founded in 1986 and is run as a private institution.

The school is up to senior secondary level (XI–XII) and is affiliated to the Central Board of Secondary Education (CBSE). The school is a coeducational day school, with classes from Kindergarten 1 to XII and teaching in English.
