= Manal Abdullah Al-Ghadani Al-Shehhi =

Emirati writer

Manal Abdullah Al-Ghadani
- Born: 1977 (age 48–49); Ras Al Khaimah

Manal Abdullah Al-Ghadani Al-Shehhi (Arabic: منال عبدالله الغداني الشحي) is an Emirati children's writer and educator. She graduated from the UAE University from the College of Education, specializing in Arabic in 2001, and worked as an Arabic language teacher, then an academic advisor in Ras Al Khaimah education. She is the first Emirati principal of a boys' school.

== Biography ==
Manal Abdullah Ahmad Al-Ghadani Al-Shehhi was born in 1977, in Ras Al Khaimah. She graduated from the UAE University from the College of Education, specializing in Arabic in 2001, and worked as an Arabic language teacher at Qubaa School for basic education for a second cycle, then moved to Noura Bint Sultan School for secondary education, where she graduated as a professional academic advisor. She co-authored the career guidance curriculum for students, supervised 15 schools to guide female students in choosing an academic specialization, and participated in organizing several exhibitions to guide students. She was appointed head of the unit of student affairs at Noura Bint Sultan School for secondary education, female students. She began writing for children and young people since the first years she studied Arabic, and she was the first female principal of a male school in the Emirates, who was appointed in 2016.

== Literary career ==
She writes stories and novels for children and young adults. In her story "A Thousand Glass Balls", she talks about a child setting up a small business and thinking creatively to help him succeed in it. Then she published "I'm Looking for a Friend", which is about teaching children how to accept oneself, understand others, and effective communication skills, as well as her story "The Power of Words", about the hidden impact of words.

Then her novel "The Princess of the Moon" for young people, in which she dealt with self-confidence and perseverance, and then in her novel "Obar: The Lost City" (2013), she talks about an interesting adventure that revolves over the sands of the Empty Quarter in the Arabian Desert, with a mixture of challenge, patience and logical thinking. It is the first part of the "Obar" collection, in the opinion of Al-Arab newspaper, fun and interesting journey in the world of fantasy and beautiful magic. Book in children's literature through which Al-Ghadani was able to raise the level of hearts' pulse as she moved from one event to another in an atmosphere far from reality, but it drew a smile on the lips of readers.

== Awards ==
- Sheikh Khalifa Educational Award for children's educational literature 2016.

== Bibliography ==
- A thousand glass balls (Arabic: 'alf kurat zujajia).
- I'm looking for a friend (Arabic: abhath ean sadiyq), 2011. ISBN 978-614-402-489-8
- Obar: The Secret Tunnels (Arabic: 'uwbar : al'anfaq alsiriya), 2013. ISBN 978-9948-444-00-8
- The Princess of the Moon (Arabic: amirat alqamar), 2011. ISBN 978-9948-15-999-5
- The Silk Road (Arabic: tariq alharir), 2011. ISBN 978-9948-07-049-8
- Obar: The Lost City (Arabic: 'uwbar : almadinat almafquda), Part 1, 2013. ISBN 978-9953-76-550-1
- Obar: Secret Tunnels (Arabic: 'uwbar :al'anfaq alsiriya), Part Two, 2014.
- Gardens in the Clouds (Arabic: hadayiq fi alsahab), 2015. ISBN 978-9948-18-495-9
- Paper 5 (Arabic: alwaraquh alkhamisa), 2015. ISBN 978-603-90557-4-7
- Born Without Talent (Arabic: wulid bila mawhiba), 2015. ISBN 978-614-439-054-2
- Obar: The Next Horror (Arabic:uwbar: alrueb alqadim), Part Three, 2020. ISBN 978-9948-464-48-8
