= Al Mamourah =

- Location within United Arab Emirates
- Coordinates: 25°48′35″N 55°58′35″E
- Country: United Arab Emirates
- Emirate: Ras Al Khaimah
- Elevation: 12 m (39 ft)

Al Mamourah is a suburb of the city of Ras Al Khaimah in the United Arab Emirates (UAE).
