= Al Nakheel =

- Location within United Arab Emirates
- Coordinates: 25°46′54″N 55°58′12″E
- Country: United Arab Emirates
- Emirate: Ras Al Khaimah
- Elevation: 19 m (62 ft)

Al Nakheel is a suburb of the city of Ras Al Khaimah in the United Arab Emirates. The community predominantly comprises low-rise residential structures providing compact apartments. Its residential sector is conveniently linked to major thoroughfares and is host to Lulu Centre and Safeer Market. Al Nakheel additionally accommodates Naeem Mall.

The Indian Public High School is located in Al Nakheel.

Al Nakheel sits right next to RAK Harbour, the community is also close to a network of roads, including the major highway Al Manama – RAK Road (E11), which allows easy access to the rest of the emirates.

Obaid Khalifa Al Jaber Mosque is located in the centre of this community. St Mary’s Orthodox Church Nakheel is a Christian church that lies just across Al Uraibi Street. St Anthony of Padua Catholic Church in Al Nakheel is also located on the same drive.
