= Jerome Carle =

United Arab Emirates manufacturing manager

Jerome Carle is the chief executive officer of Julphar. He is responsible for all aspects of Julphar's operations. He joined the company in January 2017 as the corporate CFO, before being appointed general manager in April 2017.
