= Sheikh Saqer Humaid Al Qasimi =

Sheikh Saqer Bin Humaid Al Qasimi Sheikh Saqer is a business person. He served in the military and also has extensive experience in commodity and money markets. He holds a bachelor's degree in Finance from Chico State University, California in the United States. He has been a member of the board of directors of Julphar since 2005. In April 2019 he was appointed Chairman of Julphar.
