= Al Maarid =

Maarid
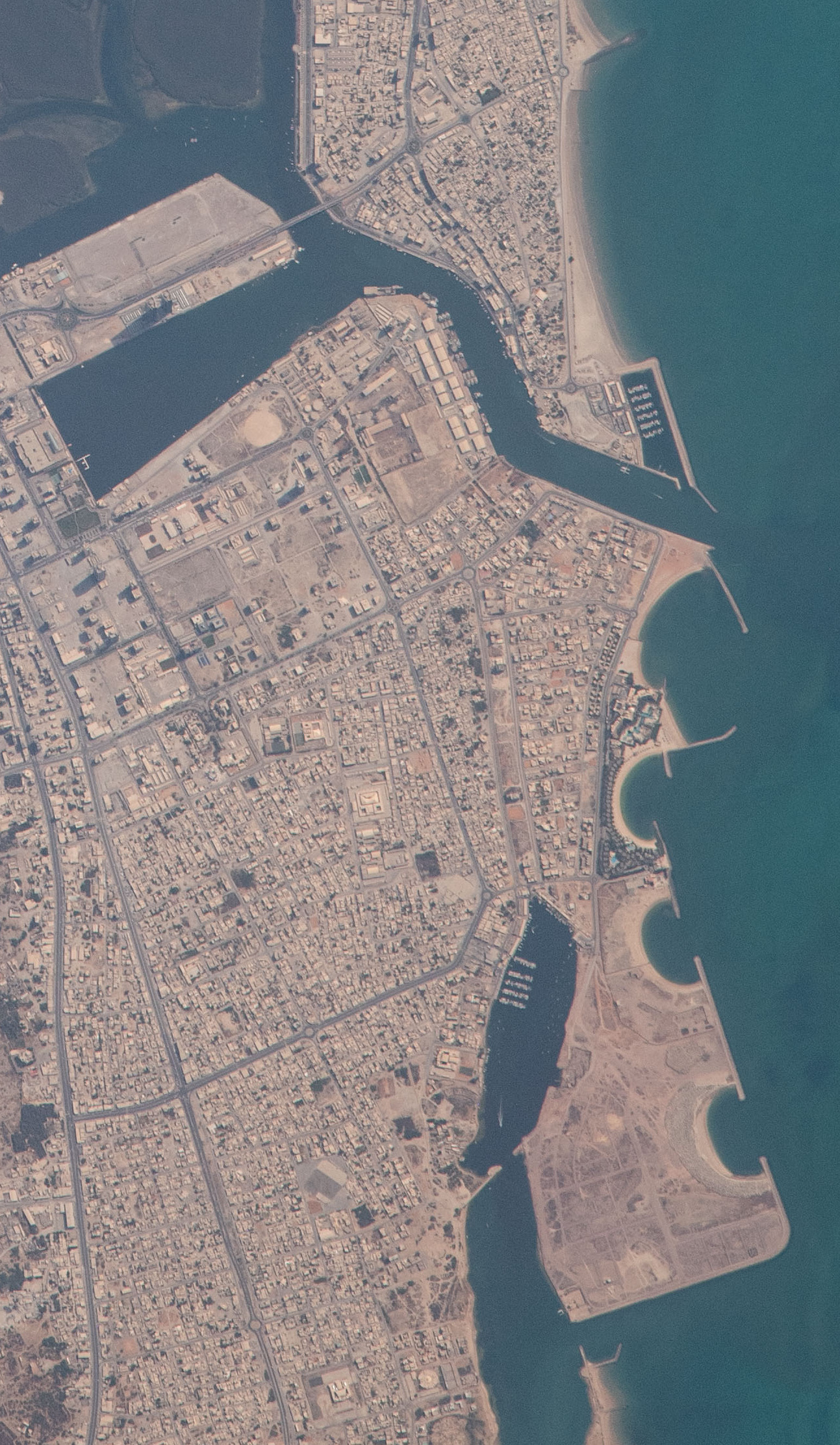

- Location within United Arab Emirates
- Coordinates: 25°48′34″N 55°57′45″E
- Country: United Arab Emirates
- Emirate: Ras Al Khaimah
- Elevation: 5 m (16 ft)
  - Summer (DST): dubai

Al Maarid is a suburb of the city of Ras Al Khaimah, United Arab Emirates (UAE). It is the site of the Hilton Ras Al Khaimah Resort & Spa and the Mira Coral Bay waterfront development.
