= Jabal Ghumaylah =

Hill in the United Arab Emirates

25°28′N 56°02′E

Jabal Ghumaylah is a hill in Ras al-Khaimah.
