= RAK Ceramics =

Ceramic brand in Ras Al Khaimah

RAK Ceramics P.J.S.C
- Company type: Public
- Traded as: Abu Dhabi Stock Exchange (ADX) RAKCEC
- Industry: Ceramics Manufacturing
- Founded: 1989
- Founder: Saud Bin Saqr Al Qasimi
- Headquarters: Ras Al Khaimah, United Arab Emirates
- Area served: Asia, Europe and Africa
- Key people: Abdallah Massaad (CEO)
- Products: Ceramic tiles, sanitaryware, taps and kitchen fittings, tableware, tile adhesives, interior ancillary products
- Website: www.rakceramics.com

RAK Ceramics P.J.S.C Founded in 1989 and headquartered in the United Arab Emirates, RAK Ceramics serves clients in more than 150 countries through a network of operational hubs in Middle East, Europe, North Africa, Asia, North and South America and Australia.

RAK Ceramics has an annual production capacity of 118 million square meters of tiles, 5.7 million pieces of sanitaryware, 36 million pieces of porcelain tableware and 2.6 million pieces of faucets. Across global operations, the company employs approximately 12,000 staff from more than 40 nationalities.

RAK Ceramics specializes in ceramic and Gres Porcelain wall and floor tiles, sanitaryware, faucets and tableware.

RAK Ceramics has 23 plants across the United Arab Emirates, India, Bangladesh and Europe.

RAK Ceramics is a publicly listed company on the Abu Dhabi Securities Exchange in the United Arab Emirates and on the Dhaka Stock Exchange in Bangladesh as a group, the company has an annual turnover of approximately US$1 billion.

== History ==
RAK Ceramics was established in Ras Al Khaimah in 1989 by H.H. Sheikh Saud Bin Saqr Al Qasimi, member of the Supreme Council and Ruler of Ras Al Khaimah.

In 1991 RAK Ceramics first tile plant began operating with an annual output of 1,825,000 square meters of tiles.

In 1993 RAK Ceramics opened its first sanitaryware plant in Ras Al Khaimah with an annual output of 350,000 pieces of sanitaryware.

By the year 2000, the company had opened its first overseas plant in Bangladesh.

From 2000 to 2004, RAK Ceramics invested heavily, expanding the company, and exporting to almost 120 countries by 2004.

In 2004, RAK Luminous, ability to glow in the dark & RAK Slim, a thickness of just 4.5mm are introduced.

In 2006, RAK Ceramics opened its 10th UAE tile plant with an annual output of 16,425,000 square meters of tiles.

In 2007, RAK Ceramics entered into a joint venture with the KLUDI Group and Kludi RAK was established, producing exquisite designer and water saving faucets.

In 2010, RAK Ceramics becomes the world's largest ceramics manufacturer. By 2012, RAK Ceramics had supplied 1 billion square metres of tiles to projects around the world since the company began.

In 2013, RAK Ceramics Launched Maximus Mega Slab, a super-sized slab.

In 2021, RAK Ceramics collaborates with international fashion brand ELIE SAAB to launch five luxurious bathroom and surface collections.

In 2022, RAK Ceramics inks 100% KLUDI acquisition deal, a German showering system manufacturer, which included 49% of the KLUDI RAK Joint Venture which totaled 39 million euros.

== Ownership ==
The largest shareholder of RAK Ceramics is now Falcone Investments with a 20.71% stake in the business. Other shareholders include Al Rajhi Partners LLC; the Government of Ras Al Khaimah; etc.

== Affiliates abroad ==
In addition to its production facilities in Ras Al Khaimah, RAK Ceramics operates plants in Bangladesh and India . In October 2015 the company acquired the remaining 8% minority share of its Indian facility, making RAK India a wholly owned subsidiary of RAK Ceramics.

In 2015 RAK Ceramics focused on acquisitions aimed at strengthening the control of the Group over its subsidiaries, acquiring 100% of its subsidiaries in India, and in early, 2016 RAK Ceramics acquired the remaining shares in its subsidiaries in the UK, Italy, Germany and Australia.

== Materials and technology ==
Raw materials are sourced locally (sand, quartz and feldspar) as well as Europe, India, Indonesia, Thailand and Malaysia (kaolin, ball clay and feldspar).

A wide range of technologies are used at the company's plants, some of which include digital printing technology, continua+, RAK SANIT (The anti-bacterial technology), glow in the dark and other technologies.

== Products ==
Tiles

RAK Ceramics offers one of the largest collections of ceramic wall and floor tiles, gres porcelain and super-sized slabs in the industry. Offering more than 6,000 production models, tiles are manufactured in various sizes, from the smallest 10x10cm up to the largest in the region at 135x305cm, the widest range offered in the ceramics field.

Today [when?] RAK Ceramics is one of the largest ceramics manufacturers in the world with a global production capacity of 118 million square meters of tiles, 5.7 million pieces of sanitaryware, 36 million pieces of porcelain tableware and 2.6 million pieces of faucets per year.

Sanitaryware

15,616 pieces of sanitaryware are produced every day globally. It takes 100 days from initial design to a finished model.

On 28 February 2023, RAK Ceramics announced that it would invest US$14 million to improve its sanitaryware production line to incorporate to create savings in energy consumption and carbon emissions.

Faucets

RAK Ceramics acquired and consolidated KLUDI in 2022. KLUDI is a nearly 100-years old brand engaged in manufacturing of kitchen and bathroom faucets and showering system through its factories across Germany and the UAE.

Tableware

RAK Ceramics offers porcelain tableware through its sister company RAK Porcelain. Their products are supplied to more than 40,000 hotels, airlines, cruise liners, convention centers, stadiums who endorse them in various segments of the HORECA industry, across more than 165 countries with clients including JW Marriot, Hyatt and Sheraton, amongst others.

== Employees ==
Across global operations RAK Ceramics employs approximately 12,000 staff from more than 40 nationalities.
