= Julphar =

Pharmaceutical company based in the United Arab Emirates

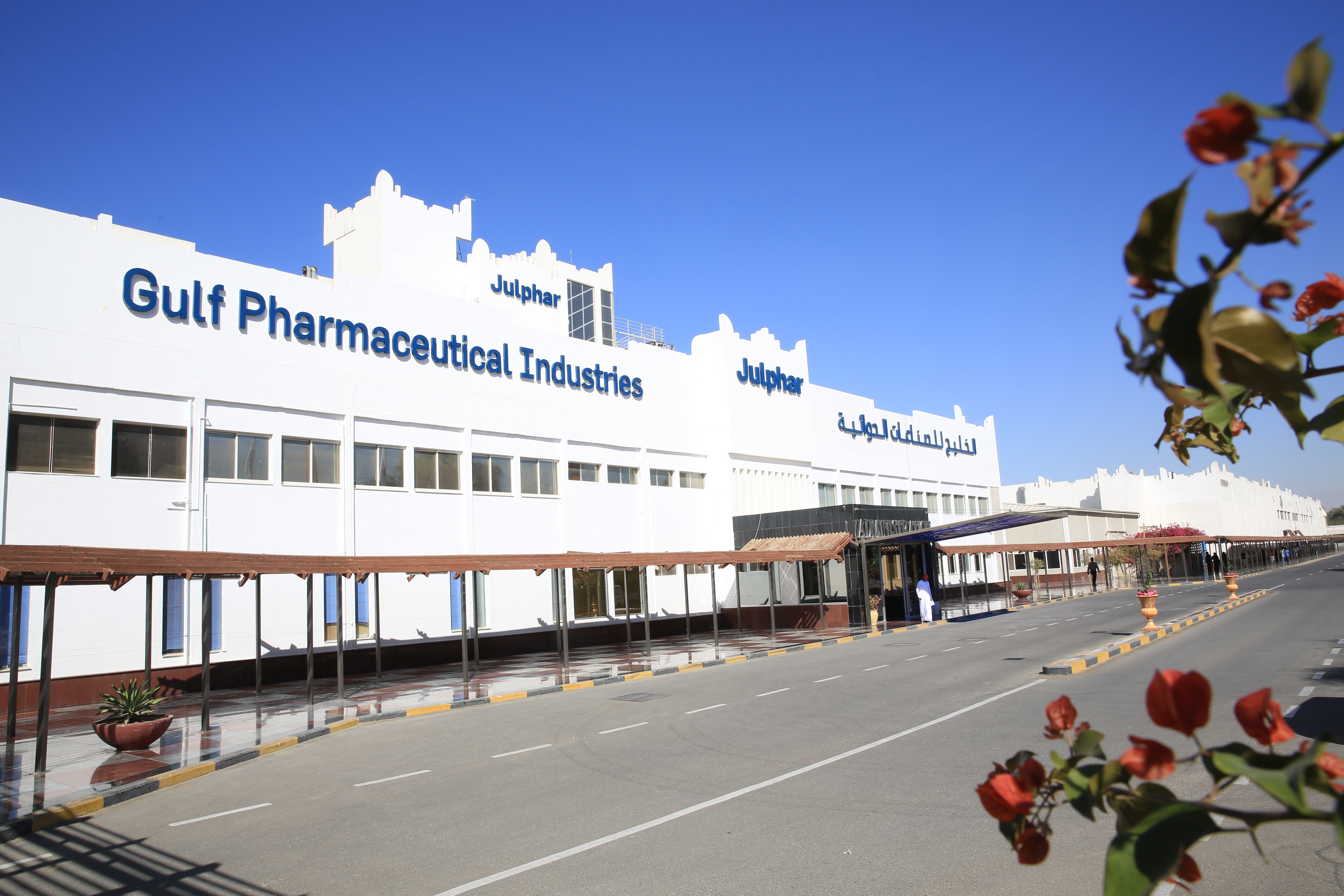
- Julphar headquarters
- Company type: Public shareholding company
- Traded as: ADX: JULPHAR
- Industry: Pharmaceuticals
- Founded: 1980; 46 years ago
- Headquarters: Ras Al Khaimah, UAE
- Area served: Worldwide
- Key people: Sheikh Saqer Humaid Al Qasimi (Chairman); Jerome Carle (CEO)
- Revenue: ▲AED 1.43 billion (2014)
- Operating income: ▲AED 238.5 million (2014)
- Net income: ▲AED 234.7 million (2014)
- Number of employees: 5,000
- Website: www.julphar.net

Julphar is an Emirati pharmaceutical manufacturer in the Middle East. Headquartered in Ras Al Khaimah, United Arab Emirates, the company employs more than 5,000 people and distributes its pharmaceutical products internationally. The company has three divisions — General Medicines, Julphar Diabetes Solutions and Julphar Life. In 2018, the company was ranked as the number one pharmaceutical manufacturer in the UAE.

== History ==
Julphar was established in 1980. The company obtained Ministry of Health approval for its first 30 products four years later and began manufacturing liquids and semi-solids in 1988. In 1990, distribution agents were established in key markets across the globe and work began on the construction of new manufacturing facilities in Ras Al Khaimah.

Julphar's transportation and shipping division, MenaCool, was launched in 2008 to transport the company's medicines across the MENA region. In 2011, Julphar crossed AED 1 billion in sales, an 11.3% growth from 2010. Julphar began producing biosimilars in 2012 and launched a new division, Julphar Diabetes Solutions, becoming the only company in the Middle East and North Africa to locally produce Recombinant DNA (r-DNA), the raw material used to make insulin. Julphar inaugurated its first facility on the African continent with the opening of Julphar Ethiopia in 2013.

The launch of Julphar Bangladesh took place two years later in 2015, which coincided with the launch of Julphar Life, the company's consumer division. In 2017, Julphar acquired IV fluid company, Gulf Inject and officially opened a facility in Saudi Arabia in collaboration with its local partner, Cigalah Group. In 2018, Julphar signed an agreement with the Ministry of Health (United Arab Emirates) to ensure the availability of critical medical supplies during crisis situations.

Julphar won the Association of Strategic Alliance Professionals award in 2018 along with its partner, Merck & Co., becoming the first pharmaceutical company from the Middle East and Africa to win such an award. The company also won the Frost & Sullivan 2018 Best Emerging GCC Pharmaceutical Manufacturing Company of the Year award.

== Facilities ==
Julphar has 16 production facilities.

=== Julphar UAE ===
Julphar UAE is based in Ras Al Khaimah and began operations in 1980. A total of 13 facilities produce tablets, capsules, pediatric powder suspensions (PPS), syrups, suspensions, vials, drops, ampoules, creams, ointments and suppositories.

=== Julphar Saudi Arabia ===
Julphar Saudi Arabia was launched in 2017 and is a joint venture between Julphar and its local partner, Cigalah Group. The facility was the first in King Abdullah Economic City to be awarded full cGMP certification on its first inspection by the Saudi Food and Drug Authority.

== Products ==
One of Julphar's leading products is Moist Exposure Burn Ointment (MEBO), a common product used for burns. The success of MEBO led to the creation of MEBO Scar, an ointment which was developed specifically by Julphar for the treatment of scars both old and new, and is used to restore the health of traumatized skin. MEBO Scar is used to treat functional and cosmetic issues caused by scarring.
