= RAK Medical and Health Sciences University =

Coordinates: 25.76697°N 55.97679°E

- Type: Public
- Established: 2006
- President: Dr. Ismail Ibrahim Ali Matalka
- Location: Ras Al Khaimah, United Arab Emirates
- Nickname: RAKMHSU
- Website: www.rakmhsu.ac.ae

RAK Medical and Health Sciences University (RAKMHSU) is a medical university in Ras Al Khaimah, United Arab Emirates. The university was established by the Ras Al Khaimah Human Development Foundation (RAK – HDF) under the leadership of Saud bin Saqr al Qasimi, Crown Prince & Deputy Ruler of Ras Al Khaimah and Chancellor of the University. RAK-HDF is a joint venture of the Ras Al Khaimah Government, Al Ghurair Investments and ETA Ascon Group, Dubai.

== Vice Chancellor ==
Dr. S Gurumadhva Rao, served as the first Vice Chancellor of RAK Medical and health sciences University.

== Colleges ==
=== College of Medical Sciences ===
RAK College of Medical Sciences offers Doctor of Medicine (MD) program consists of two years of pre-medical and four years of preclinical (integrated modular applied basic sciences) and clinical clerkship courses. After graduation, one year of Internship is required as per the guidelines of the Ministry of Health and Prevention, UAE to practice Medicine in the UAE.

The curriculum has been developed to provide learning opportunities enabling medical students to acquire fundamental knowledge, develop basic skills and appropriate principles relevant to health care in the context of the community. The six-year curriculum has been designed to follow integrated and problem based approach to medical science. It integrates basic sciences with clinical sciences to enable the students to apply their knowledge to health care and develop a professional and compassionate approach to the analysis and management of health care. The MD program obtained Initial Accreditation from Ministry of Higher Education, UAE in July 2022 and the first academic session commenced in Sep 2022. It has replaced the previous MBBS program which was offered from 2006 until 2021.

RAK College of Medical Sciences and RAK Medical and Health Sciences University are listed in the World Directory of Medical Schools

The World Directory of Medical Schools has been developed through a partnership between the World Federation for Medical Education (WFME) and the Foundation for Advancement of International Medical Education and Research (FAIMER). The World Directory provides a comprehensive compilation of the information previously contained in the IMED and Avicenna directories

=== College of Dental Sciences ===
The Bachelor of Dental Surgery (BDS) program is of five years duration followed by one year of internship. The program comprises six months of general education, two years of basic medical and dental sciences and two and a half years of clinical dental sciences. This is followed by a year of dental internship. The BDS program has obtained Initial Accreditation from Ministry of Higher Education & Scientific Research, UAE and admission is in progress for the academic session commencing September 2009.

=== College of Pharmacy ===
Bachelor of Pharmacy (B Pharm), comprises six months of general education, one year of basic sciences, two and a half years of pharmaceutical sciences and training and six months of Practice School. The total program duration is four and half years. B.Pharm program has obtained Initial Accreditation from Ministry of Higher Education and Scientific Research and admissions is in progress for the academic session commencing September 2007.

=== College of Nursing ===
College of Nursing offers a Bachelor of Science in Nursing (B.Sc Nursing) of four-year duration. The B.Sc.Nursing program has obtained initial accreditation from the Ministry of Higher Education & Scientific Research, UAE.
