= Saud bin Saqr Al Qasimi =

- Ruler Of Ras Al Khaimah
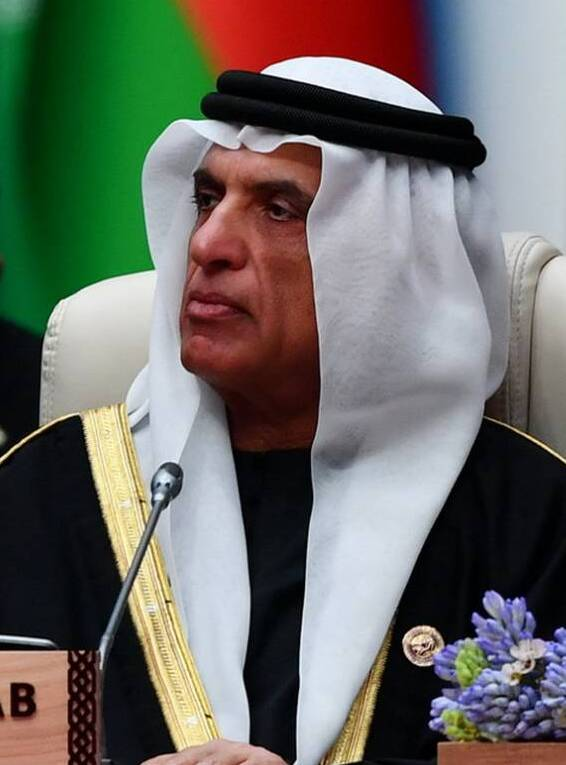
- Al Qasimi in 2023

Ruler of Ras Al Khaimah
- Reign: 27 October 2010 – present
- Predecessor: Saqr bin Mohammed Al Qasimi
- Heir apparent: Mohammed bin Saud Al Qasimi
- Born: 10 February 1956 (age 70); Dubai, Trucial States (present day United Arab Emirates)
- Spouse: Hana bint Juma Al Majid
- Issue: Mohammed bin Saud (Crown Prince); Amneh bint Saud; Ahmed bin Saud; Khalid bin Saud; Saqr bin Saud; Mahra bint Saud
- House: Al Qasimi
- Father: Saqr bin Mohammed Al Qasimi
- Religion: Islam

Sheikh Saud bin Saqr Al Qasimi (Arabic: سعود بن صقر القاسمي, romanized: Saʿūd bin Ṣaqr al-Qāsimī; born 10 February 1956) is the current ruler of the Emirate of Ras Al Khaimah, one of the seven emirates of the United Arab Emirates. He became the chief of the ruler's Emiri court in 1979, the head of the Municipal Council in 1986, and the Crown Prince and Deputy Ruler of the Emirate in June 2003. Then, he officially became the ruler of the Emirate of Ras Al Khaimah in 2010 after his father's death.

== Early life and education ==
Saud was born in Dubai on 10 February 1956. He is the fourth son of Saqr bin Mohammed Al Qasimi, his predecessor as the Ruler of Ras Al Khaimah and UAE Supreme Council Member, who died on 27 October 2010. He completed both his primary and secondary education in Ras Al Khaimah and then attended the American University of Beirut (AUB) in July 1973 to pursue his studies in economics. When the Lebanese civil war broke out in Beirut in 1975, Saud transferred to the University of Michigan, where he received a bachelor's degree in economics and political science.

== Career ==
=== Royal accession ===
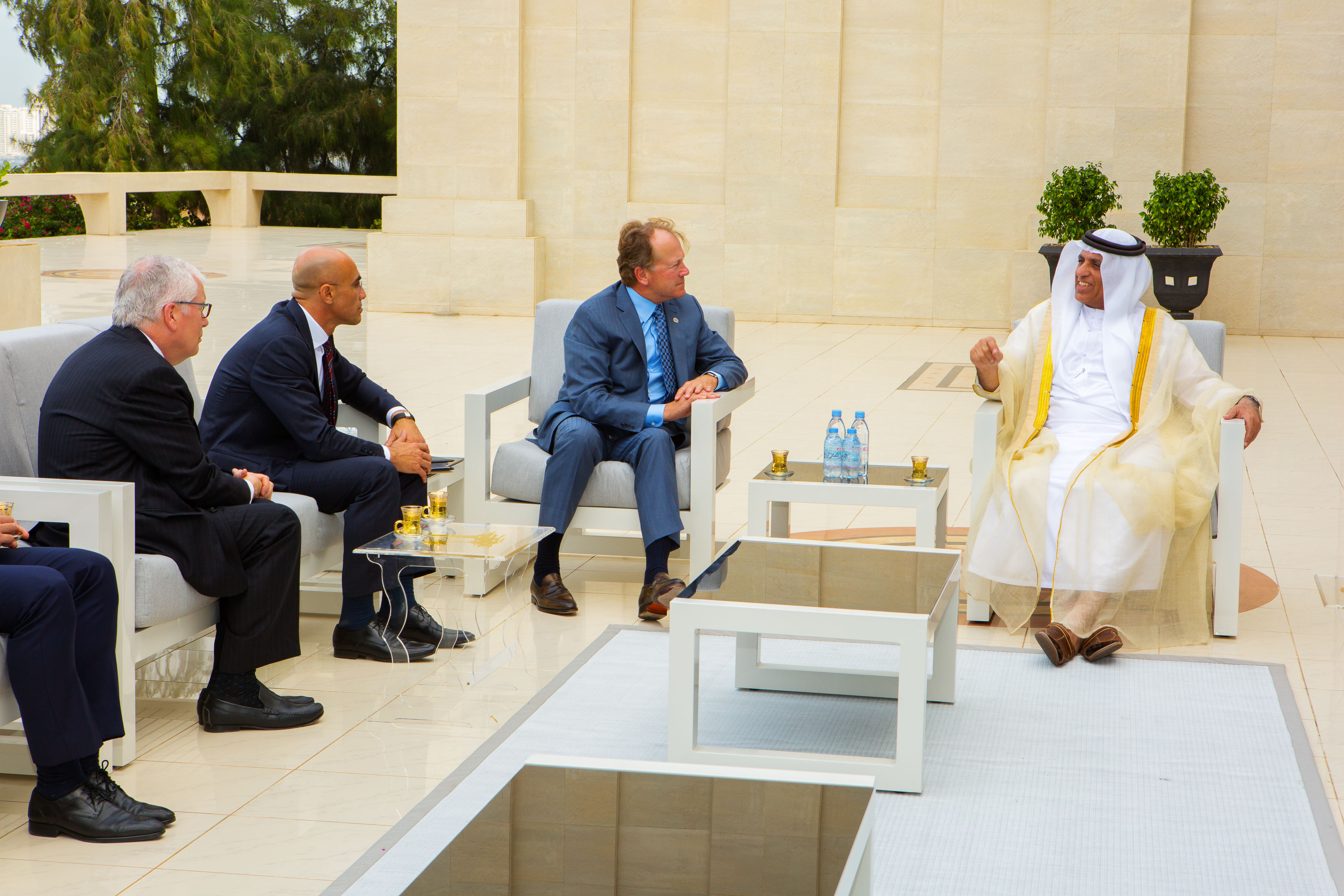
Sheikh Saud with John Chambers (CEO of Cisco Systems)

On his return to Ras Al Khaimah in 1979, Saud was appointed Chief of the Ruler's Court to assist his father, Saqr, in the administration of the sheikhdom. Saud became Crown Prince and Deputy Ruler of Ras Al Khaimah when his father dismissed his elder half-brother, Khalid bin Saqr Al Qasimi on 14 June 2003 for his hostility towards the US-led 2003 invasion of Iraq. Abu Dhabi, the lead emirate of the UAE, sanctioned the dismissal and demonstrated support for Saud by sending armored vehicles to Ras Al Khaimah. On 27 October 2010, upon the death of his father, who ruled Ras Al Khaimah for 62 years, Saud officially became the Ruler, according to a statement from the seven-member federation of the United Arab Emirates.

=== Business career ===
In 1986, Saud became the Chairman of the Ras Al Khaimah Municipal Council. In 1989, he recruited the Swiss-Lebanese engineer Khater Massaad, who helped Saud develop comprehensive industrialization plans for Ras Al Khaimah, the most important being the establishment of RAK Ceramics. The company was formed when Saud and Massaad recognized the potential of exploiting the abundant raw materials in Ras Al Khaimah for use in the production of ceramics. With Massaad as CEO, RAK Ceramics tile and sanitary ware production facilities were created from scratch 15 kilometers southwest of the town of Ras Al Khaimah, at Al Jazira Al Hamra. Relying since its creation in 1991 on inexpensive Asian labor, the company became the largest producer in the world over a period of about 20 years. As of 31 December 2012, Saud bin Saqr Al Qasimi personally continues to be the largest individual shareholder (39.88 percent of total shares), while the Government of Ras Al Khaimah benefits from a 4.98 percent stake in RAK Ceramics. In 2014, Ras Al Khaimah Ceramics declared that its founding stakeholder, Saud bin Saqr Al Qasimi, had agreed to sell 250 million shares of the company.

=== Achievements ===
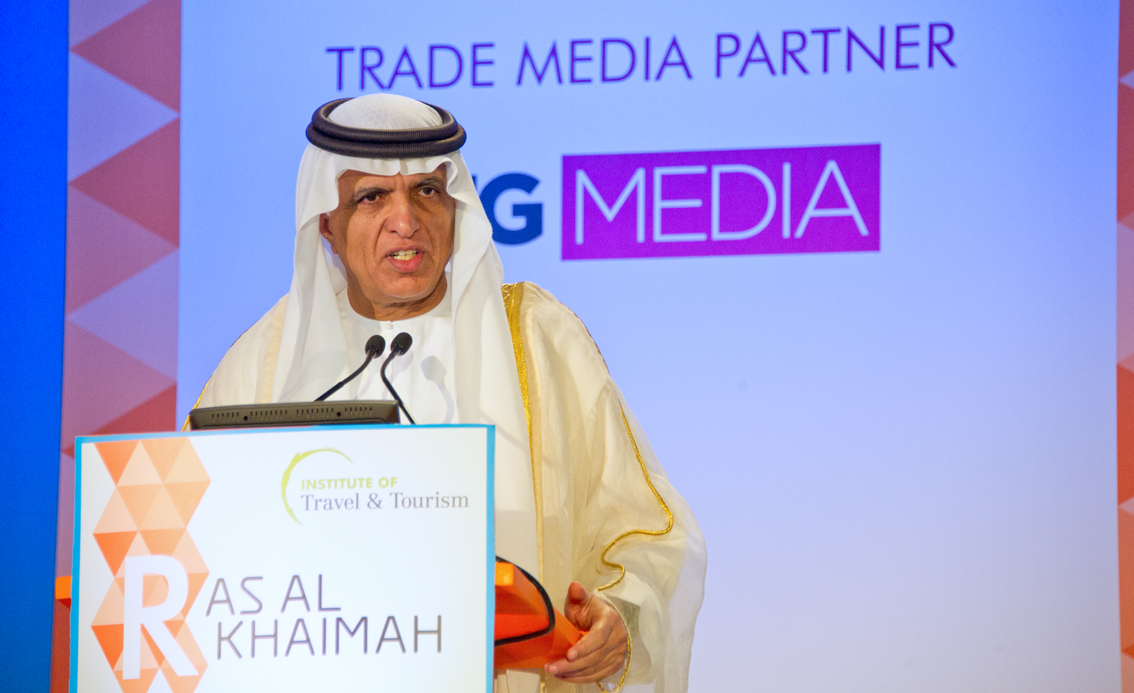
Saud at ITT Event

Soon after Saud's accession as Crown Prince, the RAK Government asked the World Bank to conduct a study on the foreign investment avenues available to the emirate and formulated a comprehensive master plan for development. In 2005, RAK Government and the World Bank organised a conference called 'Live and Invest in Ras Al Khaimah' to present before investors the vast potential that the emirate holds for investment.

Saud's reform initiatives improved the emirate GDP per capita from AED 35,000 in 2001 to AED 118,621 in 2025.

Saud has received several awards, including an honorary doctorate from the University of Bolton, UK, in 2010; an honorary fellowship of the Jawaharlal Nehru Centre for Advanced Scientific Research in India, in 2013; and an honorary doctorate degree in economics from Incheon National University, South Korea, in 2018. The award from the University of Bolton was given in recognition of his role in supporting education in the emirate and for attracting leading academic institutions from around the world to Ras Al Khaimah. In November 2018, he was named Visionary Leader of the Year at the Arabian Business Awards in Dubai.

== Public services ==
Saud has focused attention on improving education and healthcare. He created the Saqr Overseas Scholarship Program, as part of Al Qasimi Foundation for Policy Research, that was founded in 2009, to encourage and enable local men and women to pursue higher education at international universities, in particular universities in the UK, US, Canada and Australia. This program has since expanded to include domestic universities, with the Scholarships Office providing academic advisory and support for those seeking careers that meet the strategic needs of Ras Al Khaimah. The Sheikh Saud bin Saqr Charitable Educational Foundation offers scholarships to top students from low-income families into the nursing course at RAK Medical and Health Sciences University.

Additionally, the American University of Ras Al Khaimah (AURAK) was established to facilitate access to higher education in the emirate. AURAK has international accreditation by the Southern Association of Colleges and Schools Commission on Colleges (SACSCOC). In addition to that, the university has accreditation of eight engineering programs by ABET, the School of Business’ final preparations for its AACSB accreditation visit, and 3+2 options that enable undergraduates to complete a master's degree at prominent US universities. AURAK is the first university in the UAE to obtain the QS 5 Stars Plus rating. The University of Bolton set up its first Middle East campus in the emirate in 2008 and the University of Stirling, UK, established a campus in Ras Al Khaimah in 2018. Northwood University, in Michigan, US, has also set up an international campus in Ras Al Khaimah.

The Ras Al Khaimah Centre for Advanced Materials (RAK- CAM) was founded under the patronage of Saud in late 2007. RAK-CAM is intended to engage in advanced materials science research in the Middle East addressing issues in areas such as alternative energy sources, construction, water purification and environmental preservation. It holds an annual workshop in Ras Al Khaimah called International Workshop on Advanced Materials (IWAM), which brings together scientists and academics to discuss advanced materials.

Saud has also sponsored the building of Ras Al Khaimah Medical and Health Sciences University (RAKMHSU) to train future generations of doctors, nurses and pharmacists for the UAE as a whole, helping to address the chronic shortage of nurses in the UAE. The university opened in 2006 with just 22 students but by 2026, it had more than 1,300 students from almost 50 countries.

Also among the initiatives, Saud established the Aman Shelter for Women and Children, which was created in 2017.

In 2009, Saud set up by Emiri decree the Al Qasimi Foundation for Policy Research, a non-profit quasi-government organization that aids the social, cultural and economic development of Ras Al Khaimah. The Foundation focuses on research on Ras Al Khaimah and the broader UAE, developing local capacity in the public sector and engaging the community in its work. Its initiatives range from studying Arab fathers' involvement in parenting and philanthropy in education to organizing Ras Al Khaimah Art Festival, conducting "English for Life" courses among the population, and operating a studio and gallery.

== Administration ==
=== Domestic policy ===
Saud has overseen the introduction of free zones and industrial parks, efficient business licensing procedures and offshore corporate registration. Under his guidance, RAK Government adopts an institutional approach to business procedures, to reduce red tape and improve the ease of doing business. He has expanded and diversified Ras Al Khaimah's economic base and improved the quality of its social services. His policies have resulted in sustained growth for Ras Al Khaimah and a consistently high credit rating with both Fitch and S&P since 2008.

=== Economic policy ===
In the years up to 2010, Ras Al Khaimah's economic policy was marked by expansion, notably in the industry through companies such as RAK Ceramics, RAK Ports and Stevin Rock, real estate through Al Hamra and RAK Properties, and business services through Ras Al Khaimah Free Trade Zone. The Great Recession belatedly reached the UAE. Following Dubai's de facto default in November 2009, Ras Al Khaimah was heavily hit. In 2010, Saud's new economic adviser Jim Stewart, the CEO of RAK Investment and Development Office, altered Ras Al Khaimah's economic strategy from debt-fueled growth to austerity. The aim was to bring the 5 billion AED (or US$1.37 billion) debts of Ras Al Khaimah under control. Saud instructed the CEO of RAKIA and RAK Ceramics, Khater Massaad, to sell all global assets, notably in Georgia, where the emirate held shares in three main companies - RAKIA Georgia LLC, Rakeen Development LLC, and RAKIA Georgia Free Industrial Zone. Real estate there and in particular the Port of Poti were labeled "not a strategic asset" in the October 2010 cover story about Khater Massaad, "The Man Who Sold The World". Similar debt reduction policies started to be applied to other enterprises in which Saud personally or Ras Al Khaimah had shares in, the most important being RAK Ceramics. By the end of 2022, RAK Ceramics achieved an all-time high net profit of 340.1 million AED, with total annual revenues of 3.52 billion AED. Overall in Ras Al Khaimah since the Great Recession, debt has been reduced and sustained growth has been witnessed. By the end of 2022, government debt (including that of state-owned enterprises) had fallen to a low 10.4% and it is expected to reduce further to 9.1% in 2024. The emirate has also maintained its A/A-1 rating with a stable outlook by both Fitch and S&P.

=== Developmental policy ===
Saud has overseen an era of cross-sector developmental progress in Ras Al Khaimah, particularly in the areas of tourism, real estate, manufacturing, and logistics. In 2011, he set up Ras Al Khaimah Tourism Development Authority, with a record 1.35 million visitors recorded in 2025.

In 2022, Ras Al Khaimah added hotel brands such as InterContinental, Mövenpick, and Radisson.

Interest in the Emirates' real estate market is also gaining traction. The Ras Al Khaimah Economic Zone is now home to more than 40,000 companies and manufacturing contributing the largest proportion to the emirate's GDP, at 30%.

RAK Ports is also expanding its logistical opportunities to companies globally, with recent infrastructure investment of US$250 million. RAK Ports’ Saqr Port and Freezone is the largest bulk port in the Middle East It is also strategically positioned close to the Strait of Hormuz, one of the world's busiest shipping lanes. Etihad Rail, the UAE's national rail project, will also extend into Ras Al Khaimah, facilitating the transfer of an estimated 3.5 million tonnes of construction material from the emirate's Stevin Rock, one of the largest quarrying companies in the world, annually.

=== Accession dispute ===
After Saqr replaced Khalid as a crown prince with Saud in June 2003, from exile, Khalid began an unsubstantiated smear campaign against his younger half-brother involving the payment of millions of dollars to US lobbyists and an English solicitor to "undermine the current regime's standing" as a means for Khalid to regain power in Ras Al Khaimah. The campaign culminated in October 2010 upon the death of Saqr. Khalid returned from exile in London in an attempt to initiate a bloodless coup but the UAE government supported Saud's right to rule the emirate, and so he prevailed.

Khalid had claimed that Saud and Ras Al Khaimah had connections to Iran. However, these accusations stem either directly from the former crown prince of RAK or indirectly from research he funded with a vested interest in embarrassing or undermining the regime in the hope of returning to power.

Khalid's US communications team, which consisted of US public relations consultants, Washington lobbyists, former US-special forces strategists, and the famous lobbying firm BSKH, insisted these claims were "well sourced", but they were rejected by the UAE embassies in London and the US. The UAE also denied the claim that RAK had links to Iran's nuclear program and that a port in RAK had, in effect, become an Iranian base, allowing Tehran to avoid international sanctions. Instead, the Embassy described the claims as attacks that were "baseless and without foundation."

"These appear to be old, scurrilous rumors which Khalid has made on numerous occasions," a spokesman for the UAE said in a statement. "His claims are baseless and without foundation and should be seen in the context of his long-standing dispute with his family. We are surprised that these old allegations are now being rehashed once again."

The Islah Movement (Al Islah), a reformist political current with ideological though not organizational links to the Muslim Brotherhood, historically had strong support in Ras Al Khaimah but its influence and reach has diminished since it was disbanded in 1994. One of its leaders was the human rights activist and lawyer Muhammad Al-Mansuri (Mohammed Al-Mansoori). He was a legal adviser to Saud but was dismissed in December 2009. Later, he was among the so-called UAE 94, a group of reformists tried in the UAE. Al-Mansoori was among 69 people sentenced on 2 July 2013 by the Federal Supreme Court in Abu Dhabi (25 were acquitted) and received a jail term of ten years for "belonging to an illegal, secret organization ... that aims to counter the foundations of this state in order to seize power and of contacting foreign entities and groups to implement this plan."

== Personal life ==
Saud is married to Hana bint Juma Al Majid, who holds a Bachelor of Business Administration and Accounting from United Arab Emirates University. They have six children.

Mohammed (Crown Prince) (political science degree from the University of California, USA); Amneh (MBA from Stanford University in California, USA) (Chairperson of RAK Investment and Development Office); Ahmed (Sandhurst Military Academy, UK) (Chairman of RAK Public Services Department, Chairman of RAK Hospitality Holding, Chairman of RAK Petroleum Authority, President of Al Rams Sports and Cultural Club); Khalid (degree in business management from New York University Abu Dhabi) (Vice-chairman of RAK Investment and Development Office), Saqr (Bachelor of Science degree in banking and international finance from Bayes School, City University of London) (Chairman of RAK Ceramics) and Mahra (bachelor of public policy and social research from New York University Abu Dhabi).

Saud's four sons previously served in the United Arab Emirates Armed Forces National Service.

Saud bin Saqr Al Qasimi Ras Al Khaimah Born: 10 February 1956
Royalty of the United Arab Emirates
Vacant Title last held by Saqr bin Mohammad Al Qasimi	Emir; 27 October 2010 – present	Incumbent; Heir: Mohammed bin Saud bin Saqr Al Qasimi
