= Khuzam =

- Location within United Arab Emirates
- Coordinates: 25°45′54″N 55°56′3″E
- Country: United Arab Emirates
- Emirate: Ras Al Khaimah
- Elevation: 29 m (95 ft)

Population (2023)
  - Total: 7,595

Khuzam is a suburb of the city of Ras Al Khaimah, in the United Arab Emirates (UAE). It is the location of the city's Eid Mussalla or outdoor mosque.
