= Ras Al Khaimah =

Capital city of Ras Al Khaimah, UAE

Ras Al Khaimah رَأْس ٱلْخَيْمَة
- City
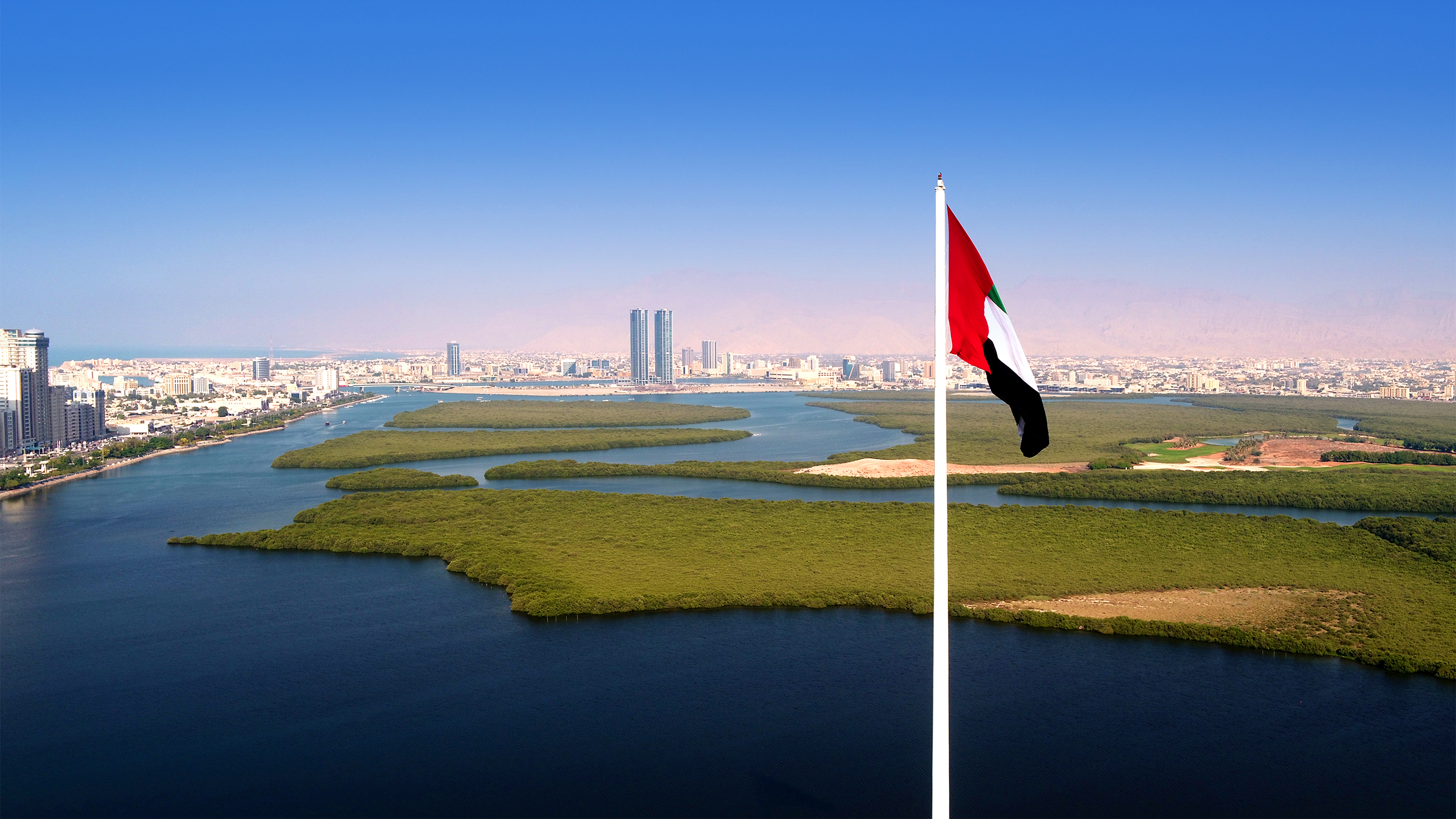
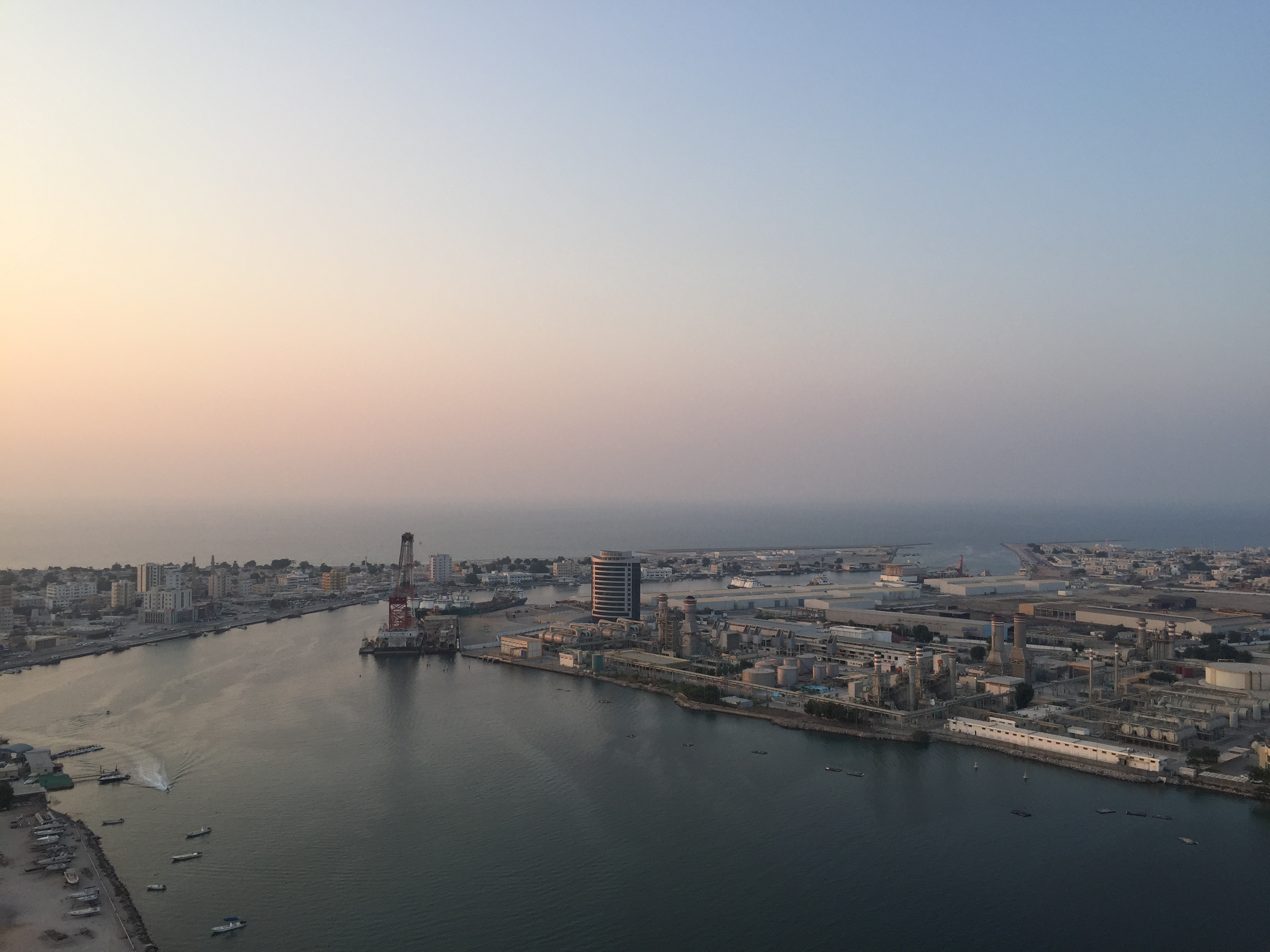
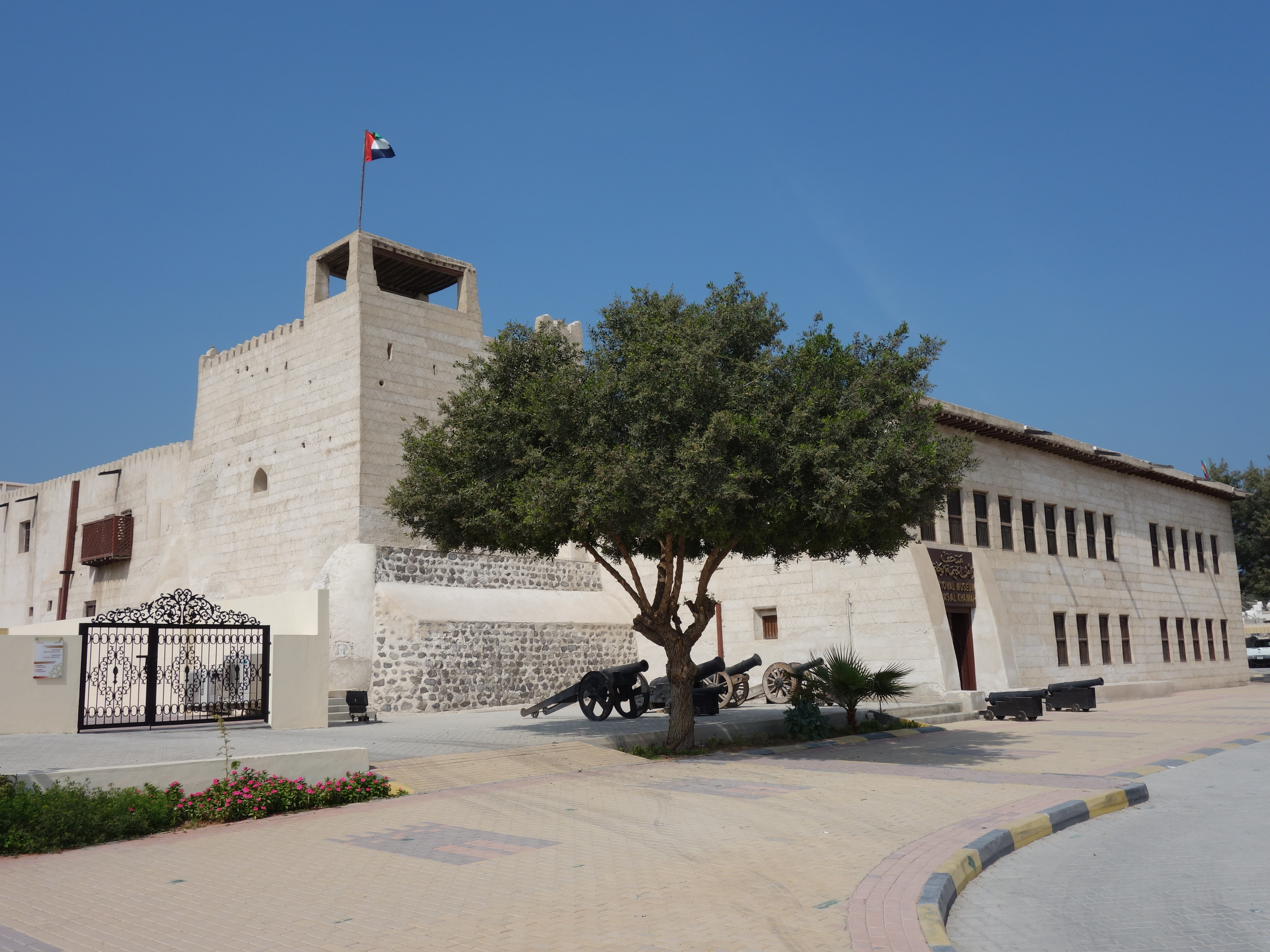
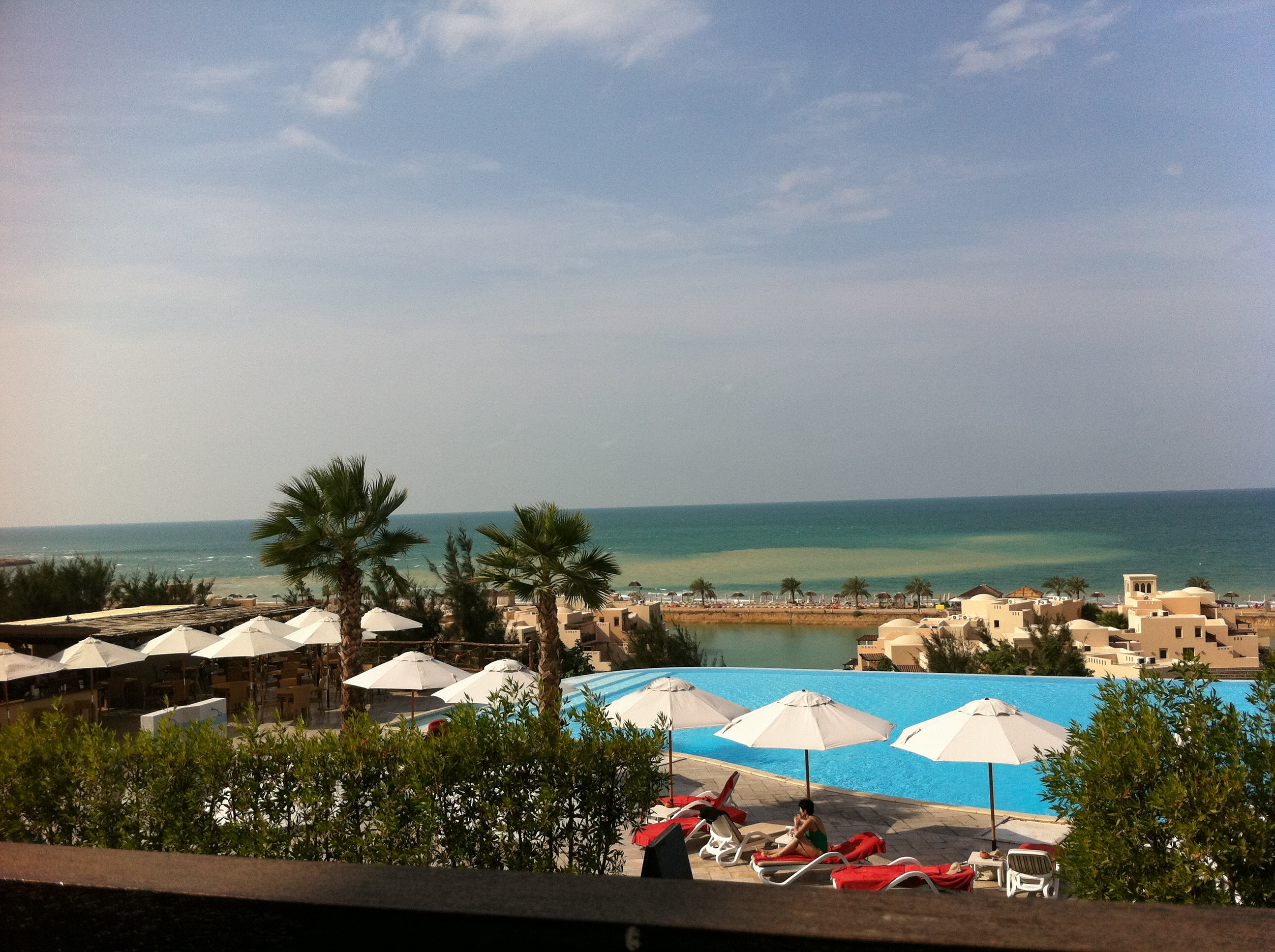
- Clockwise from top: Mangroves are seen from Al Qawasim corniche flagpole, Ras Al Khaimah creek, Rotana resort in Ras Al Khaimah, Ras Al Khaimah fort museum

- Flag Coat of arms

- Location of RAK City within the UAE Ras Al Khaimah (Persian Gulf) Ras Al Khaimah (Middle East) Ras Al Khaimah (West and Central Asia)
- Coordinates: 25°47′19″N 55°56′35″E
- Country: United Arab Emirates
- Emirate: Ras Al Khaimah

Government
  - Type: Municipality
  - Sheikh: Saud bin Saqr Al Qasimi

Area
  - Total: 373 km^{2} (144 sq mi)
- Elevation: 40 m (130 ft)

Population (2025)
  - Total: 191,753
  - Density: 514/km^{2} (1,330/sq mi)

GDP
  - Metro: US$ 15 billion (2025)
  - Per capita: US$ 32,500 (2025)
- Time zone: UTC+4 (UAE Standard Time)
- Website: RAK.ae

Ras Al Khaimah (Arabic: رَأْس ٱلْخَيْمَة; /raʔs͜ ɪlˈxajma/, Emirati Arabic: [räːs͜ ɪlχe̞ːmɛ] ), often referred to its initials RAK, is an industrial port city and the largest city and capital of the Emirate of Ras Al Khaimah in the United Arab Emirates. The city had a population of 191,753 people in 2025, and is the third-most populous city of the northern UAE after Sharjah and Ajman. The city is divided by a creek into two parts: old town in the west and Al Nakheel in the east. The town is the successor to the Islamic era port and trading hub of Julfar.

== Etymology ==
Ras Al Khaimah translates to "Headland of the Tent". The Arabic word Khaimah (خَيْمَة) means 'tent', but also refers to the palm frond or areesh houses that were common in the area.

== History ==
=== Antiquity ===
Ras Al Khaimah has been the site of continuous human habitation for 7,000 years, with archaeological finds dating back to the Neolithic. The northern area of the city today known as Ras Al Khaimah was previously the location of the important Islamic era settlement and port of Julfar. Although Julfar and Ras Al Khaimah are often placed together, they are in fact two different settlements with distinctive histories. Julfar was abandoned in the early 17th Century as Ras Al Khaimah rose. Julfar itself had a predecessor settlement, Kush, today located in suburbs to the north of the city.

One of Ras Al Khaimah's most celebrated sons, Ibn Majid, was a hugely influential seaman, navigator and cartographer, and there is evidence in his writing that the town he came from was at that time known as Ras Al Khaimah, that town having eclipsed Julfar as the principal port and settlement of the Shimal coast. Since 1507 the city fell under control of the Portuguese Empire.

=== 18th to 19th centuries ===
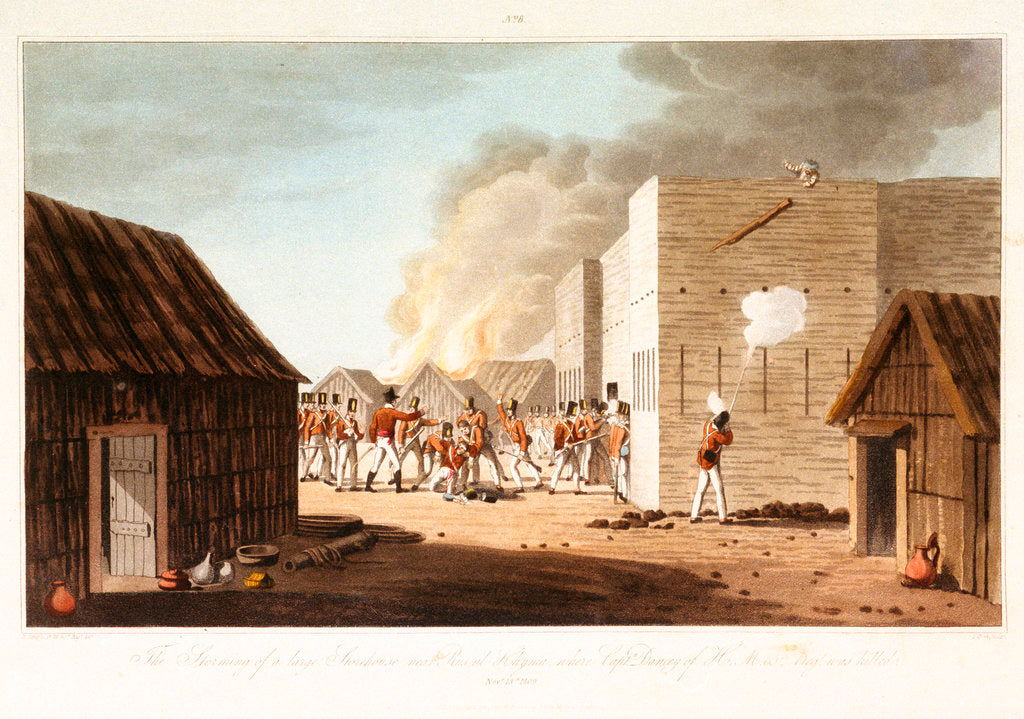
Ras Al Khaimah during the Persian Gulf campaign of 1809 in November 1809

In the early 18th century, the Qawasim (singular Al Qasimi) established themselves in Ras Al Khaimah and Sharjah on the Arabian Peninsula, growing to become a significant maritime force with holdings on both the Persian and Arabian coasts that frequently came into conflict with British flagged shipping.

In the aftermath of a series of attacks against shipping sailing under Omani flags and following 1809 monsoon season, the British mounted the Persian Gulf campaign of 1809 against Ras Al Khaimah, in which the Al Qasimi fleet was largely destroyed. The British operation continued to Lingeh on the Persian coast which was, like the Greater and Lesser Tunbs islands, administered by the Al Qasimi.

By the morning of 14 November, the military expedition was over and the British forces returned to their ships, having suffered light casualties of five killed and 34 wounded. Arab losses are unknown, but were probably significant, while the damage done to the Al Qasimi fleets was severe: a significant portion of their vessels had been destroyed.

Following the 1809 campaign, an 1815 arrangement was made between the British and the Al Qasimi. However, by 1819 it was clear the arrangement had broken down and so in November of that year, the British embarked on a second expedition against the Al Qasimi at Ras Al Khaimah, led by Major-General William Keir Grant.

The force gathered off the coast of Ras Al Khaimah on 25 and 26 November and, on 2 and 3 December, troops were landed south of the town and set up batteries of guns and mortars and, on 5 December, the town was bombarded from both land and sea for a period of four days, until, on 9 December, the fortress and town of Ras Al Khaimah were stormed and found to be practically deserted. On the fall of Ras Al Khaimah, three cruisers were sent to blockade Rams to the North and this, too was found to be deserted and its inhabitants retired to the 'impregnable' hill-top fort of Dhayah.

The British landed a force at Rams on 18 December, which fought its way inland through date plantations to Dhayah Fort on the 19th. There, 398 men and another 400 women and children held out, without sanitation, water or effective cover from the sun, for three days under heavy fire from mortars and 12-pound cannon.

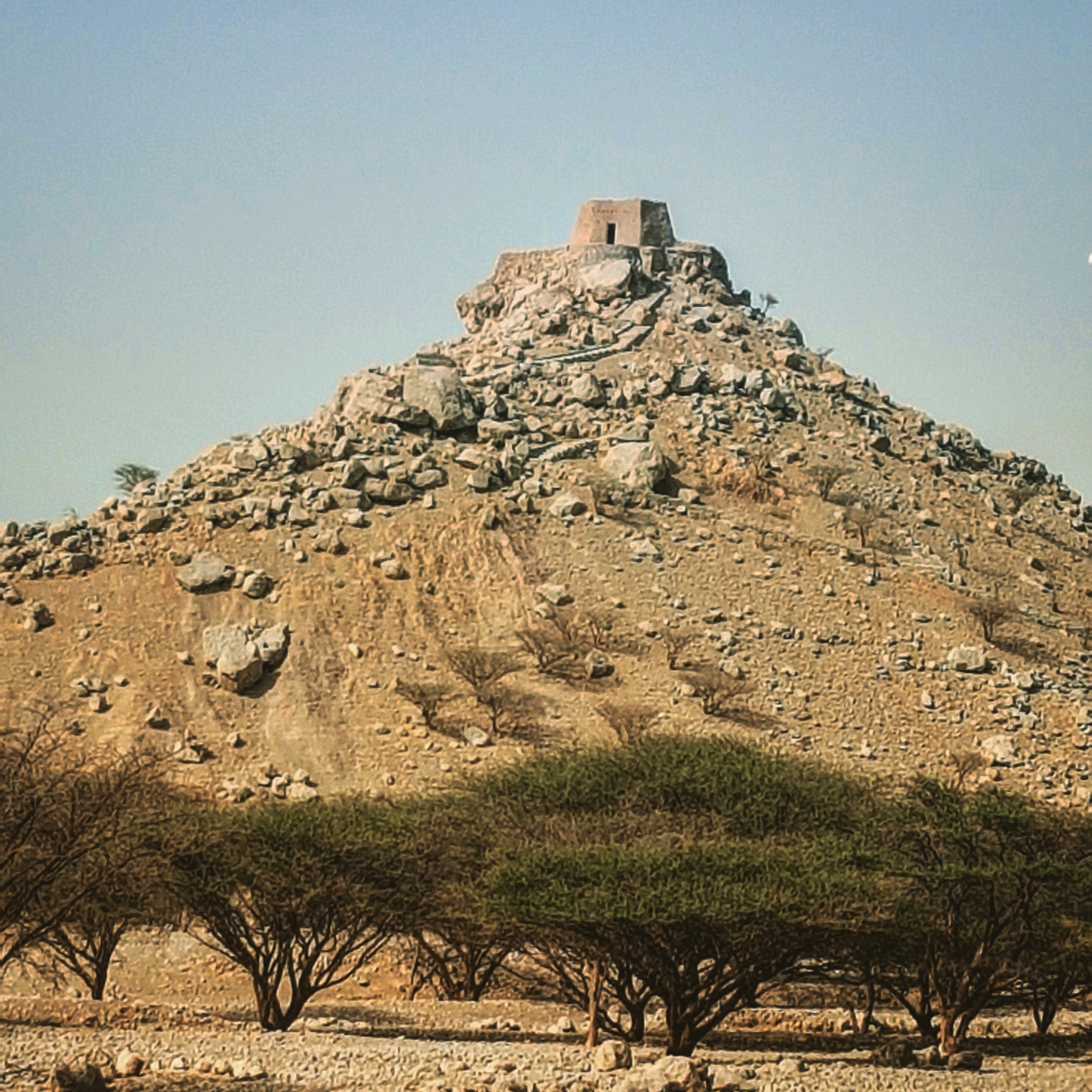
The hilltop fort of Dhayah

The two 24-pound cannon from HMS Liverpool which had been used to bombard Ras Al Khaimah from the landward side were once again pressed into use and dragged across the plain from Rams, a journey of some four miles. Each of the guns weighed over 2 tonnes. After enduring two hours of sustained fire from the big guns, which breached the fort's walls, the last of the Al Qasimi surrendered at 10.30 on the morning of 22 December.

In January 1820, the British imposed the General Maritime Treaty of 1820 signed by Sheikh Sultan Bin Saqr Al Qasimi of Sharjah who was reinstated by the British in Ras Al Khaimah after the deposition of Hassan bin Rahma Al Qasimi. The treaty stipulated the end of piracy and slavery, and laid the foundation for the British protectorate over the Trucial States that lasted until 1 December 1971.

c. 1822 Bombay Marine manuscript plan of the Ras Al Khaimah ("Rassulkyma") backwater and entrance soundings surveyed by Lieut. George Edward Brucks (IOR/X/3684, f. 1r), showing approach soundings, water-level remarks, the Western Tower, and coastal buildings at Mana, digitally restored in 2026.

=== British protectorate ===
A British protectorate from this point forward, as one of the Trucial States, in 1869, Ras Al Khaimah became fully independent from neighbouring Sharjah. From September 1900 to 7 July 1921, it was re-incorporated into Sharjah; the last governor became its next independent ruler.

=== Modern history ===
The last of the Trucial States to join the newly independent United Arab Emirates, on 10 February 1972, Ras Al Khaimah, under the leadership of Sheikh Saqr bin Mohammad Al Qasimi, joined the United Arab Emirates following the Iranian seizure of Abu Musa and the Greater and Lesser Tunbs.

== Geography ==
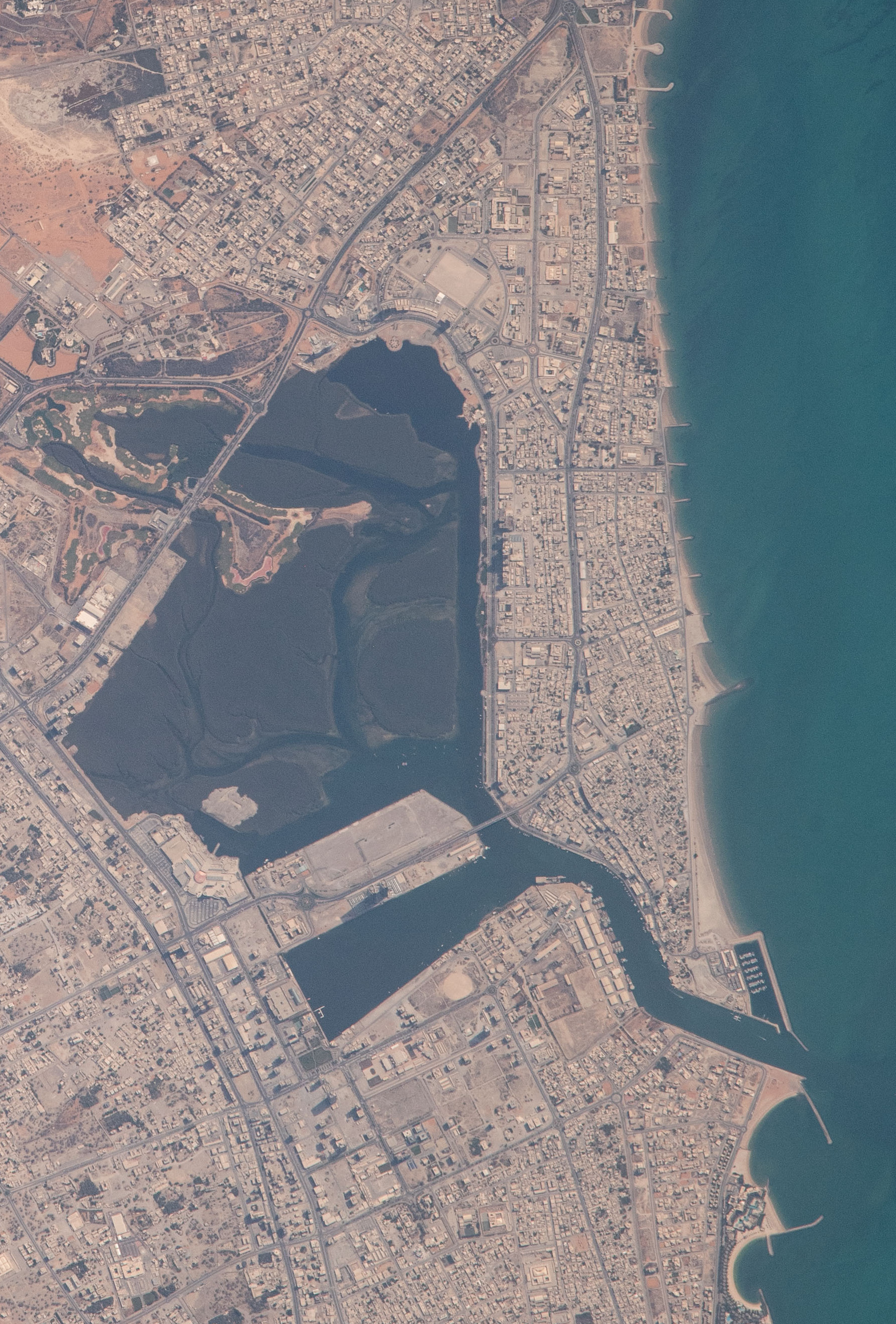
Ras Al Khaimah Creek, Mangrove Forest, RAK City, Persian Gulf

- Jabal Ghumaylah

== Climate ==
Ras Al Khaimah is notable for its climate that is particularly hot and humid even for the region. The highest ever recorded wet bulb temperature from a reputable weather station was at Ras Al Khaimah International airport with a WT of 36.3°C. Because high humidity makes cooling down via perspiration less effective, it makes hot temperatures feel significantly hotter. Wet bulb temperatures above 35°C can prove fatal even for healthy adults.

Climate data for Ras Al Khaimah International Airport (1991–2020)
| Month | Jan | Feb | Mar | Apr | May | Jun | Jul | Aug | Sep | Oct | Nov | Dec | Year |
|---|---|---|---|---|---|---|---|---|---|---|---|---|---|
| Record high °C (°F) | 32.2 (90.0) | 39.7 (103.5) | 42.9 (109.2) | 44.7 (112.5) | 48.5 (119.3) | 49.0 (120.2) | 48.6 (119.5) | 48.3 (118.9) | 47.6 (117.7) | 43.6 (110.5) | 37.8 (100.0) | 34.0 (93.2) | 49.0 (120.2) |
| Mean daily maximum °C (°F) | 25.2 (77.4) | 27.0 (80.6) | 30.3 (86.5) | 35.8 (96.4) | 40.9 (105.6) | 42.0 (107.6) | 43.3 (109.9) | 43.0 (109.4) | 41.1 (106.0) | 37.5 (99.5) | 32.0 (89.6) | 27.4 (81.3) | 35.5 (95.9) |
| Daily mean °C (°F) | 18.6 (65.5) | 20.2 (68.4) | 23.0 (73.4) | 27.5 (81.5) | 32.1 (89.8) | 34.4 (93.9) | 36.2 (97.2) | 35.9 (96.6) | 33.1 (91.6) | 29.2 (84.6) | 24.5 (76.1) | 20.4 (68.7) | 28.0 (82.4) |
| Mean daily minimum °C (°F) | 12.2 (54.0) | 13.6 (56.5) | 16.2 (61.2) | 19.7 (67.5) | 23.8 (74.8) | 26.7 (80.1) | 29.7 (85.5) | 29.4 (84.9) | 26.0 (78.8) | 21.7 (71.1) | 17.5 (63.5) | 13.8 (56.8) | 20.9 (69.6) |
| Record low °C (°F) | 4.8 (40.6) | 4.6 (40.3) | 6.8 (44.2) | 11.6 (52.9) | 15.6 (60.1) | 19.6 (67.3) | 23.4 (74.1) | 23.2 (73.8) | 18.3 (64.9) | 10.9 (51.6) | 10.2 (50.4) | 5.0 (41.0) | 4.6 (40.3) |
| Average precipitation mm (inches) | 28.2 (1.11) | 19.9 (0.78) | 30.3 (1.19) | 6.6 (0.26) | 0.1 (0.00) | 0.0 (0.0) | 0.7 (0.03) | 0.2 (0.01) | 0.2 (0.01) | 1.7 (0.07) | 7.6 (0.30) | 20.2 (0.80) | 115.5 (4.55) |
| Average precipitation days (≥ 1 mm) | 3.3 | 3.0 | 3.6 | 1.9 | 1.0 | 0.0 | 2.0 | 2.0 | 1.0 | 1.0 | 1.8 | 3.0 | 23.6 |
| Average relative humidity (%) | 71 | 69 | 64 | 54 | 46 | 50 | 51 | 51 | 58 | 61 | 65 | 70 | 59.2 |
| Mean monthly sunshine hours | 229.2 | 221.0 | 248.0 | 285.5 | 335.6 | 318.3 | 292.0 | 299.4 | 293.1 | 296.3 | 262.4 | 232.6 | 3,313.3 |
Source: NOAA (humidity 1981-2010)

== Population ==
The population of the city is around 115,949 (2021), and it is the largest city in the Emirate of Ras Al Khaimah. It is the 6th most populous city in the UAE.

== Districts ==
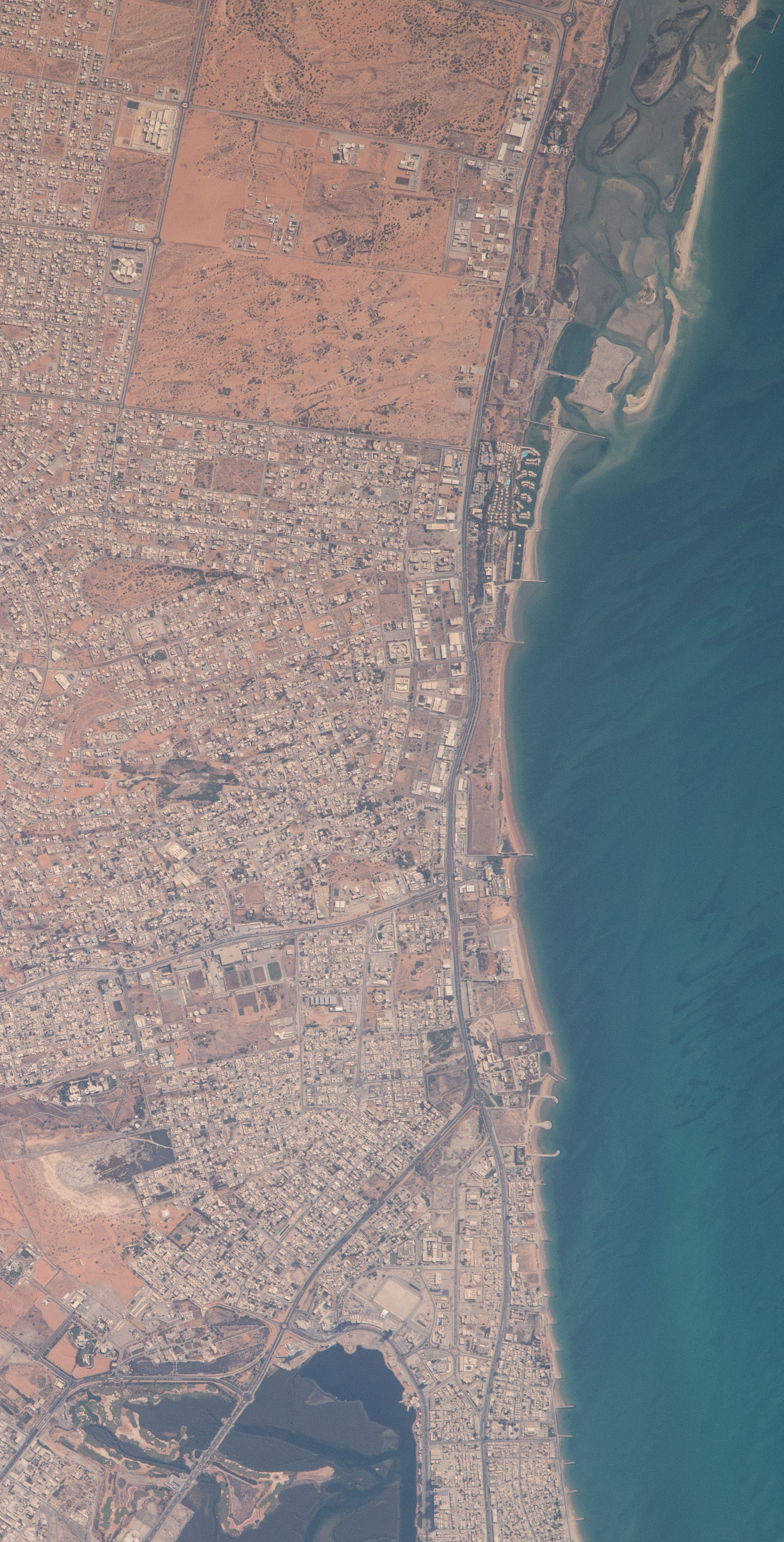
Khuzam, Al Dhait North and South, Dafan Al Khor, Dahan, Al Nadiyah, Persian Gulf, mangrove wetlands

Al Jazeera
Al Arqoub
Al Dhait North
Al Dhait South
Al Ghubb
Al Hamraniyah
Al Hudaibah
Al Juwais
Al Kharran
Al Maarid
Al Mamourah
Al Nadiyah
Al Nakheel
Al Qurm
Al Qusaidat
Al Rams
Al Saween
Al Sharisha
Al Tharfah
Al Uraibi
Khuzam
Dafan Al Khor
Dahan
Digdaga
Julfar
Madinat Khalifa bin Zayed
Old Town
Sidroh
Suhailah

== Education ==
Other than Arabic government-funded schools, the city is home to Ras Al Khaimah Academy and other Indian schools. Higher education institutions in the city include the Higher Colleges of Technology, Ras Al Khaimah Medical and Health Sciences University, American University of Ras Al Khaimah and many other colleges.

== Transportation ==
=== Land Transport ===
The Ras Al Khaimah Transport Authority currently serves the Emirate of Ras Al Khaimah and surrounding areas.

=== Air Transport ===
Ras Al Khaimah International Airport serves the Emirate of Ras Al Khaimah.

== Economy ==
The city of Ras Al Khaimah is home to the Ras Al Khaimah Economic Zone (RAKEZ) that helps connect investors and international markets. It operates an online client portal called Portal 360. The zone services businesses ranging from freelancers to SMEs and start-ups across 50 industries. RAKEZ is divided into six dedicated zones:

- Al Ghail Industrial Zone
- Al Hamra Industrial Zone
- RAKEZ Academic Zone
- Al Hulaila Industrial Zone
- Al Nakheel Business Zone
- Al Hamra Business Zone

=== Ceramics industry ===
The city is the headquarters of RAK Ceramics, a global ceramics manufacturer. The company produces 123 million square meters of tiles and 5 million pieces of sanitaryware every year. It has 12,000 employees and is listed on the Abu Dhabi Securities Exchange in the United Arab Emirates and on the Dhaka Stock Exchange in Bangladesh. Its annual turnover is estimated at $1 billion.

=== Pharmaceutical industry ===
Gulf Pharmaceutical Industries is a pharmaceutical manufacturer operating in the MENA region and headquartered in the city of Ras Al Khaimah. The company, also known under the name of Julphar, employs 5,000 people and distributes its products to 50 countries. It divides its activities between three units: Julphar Diabetes Solutions, General Medicines and Julphar Life. The company became a producer of raw ingredients for insulin in 2012.

=== Gambling industry ===
In 2022, Ras Al Khaimah announced a $3.9 billion project, Wynn Al Marjan Island, which is scheduled to open in 2027. The integrated resort is being established by Wynn Resorts, whose CEO Craig Billings confirmed that it will include a 224,000 sq. ft. “casino component”. For its 40% stake, Wynn Resorts contributed $900 million, while the remaining amount was financed by the Ras Al Khaimah government. The UAE has no laws to legalize gaming or gambling equipment. However, the country established the General Commercial Gaming Regulatory Authority (GCGRA), in September 2023. The GCGRA granted a “Commercial Gaming Facility Operator” license to Wynn Resorts, in October 2024. Given the country’s Sharia laws, gambling is completely prohibited for local citizens. But, the project was quietly progressing to target foreign travelers and reshape the region’s tourism.

== Sports ==
The city is home to football teams Emirates Club and Ras Al Khaimah Club, which have both competed in the UAE Top Division.

== Notable people ==
Notable people from Ras Al Khaimah include

- Dhaher Al-Aryani (born 1972), Trap shooter
- Manal Al Ghadani (born 1977), Writer and Teacher
- Abdullah Al-Nauri (1959–2021), Novelist
- Saqr bin Mohammed Al Qasimi (1918–2010), Ruler of the Emirate from (1948–2010)
- Khalid bin Saqr Al Qasimi, (born 1940), Former crown prince and deputy ruler (1948–2003)
- Saud bin Saqr Al Qasimi (born 1956), Current ruler of the Emirate
- Mohammed bin Saud Al Qasimi (born 1987), Current crown prince
- Marwan Al Shehhi (1978–2001), al-Qaeda terrorist and Hijacker
- Khamis Esmaeel (born 1989), Footballer
- Saif Ghobash (1932–1977), Diplomat and Engineer
- Saqr Ghobash (born 1952), Diplomat and Politician
- Priyaa Lal (born 1993), British Actress
- Ahmad ibn Mājid (1432–c. 1500), Navigator and Explorer
- Abdullah Malallah (born 1983), Footballer
- Al Hassan Saleh (born 1991), Footballer
