= Tayyibah =

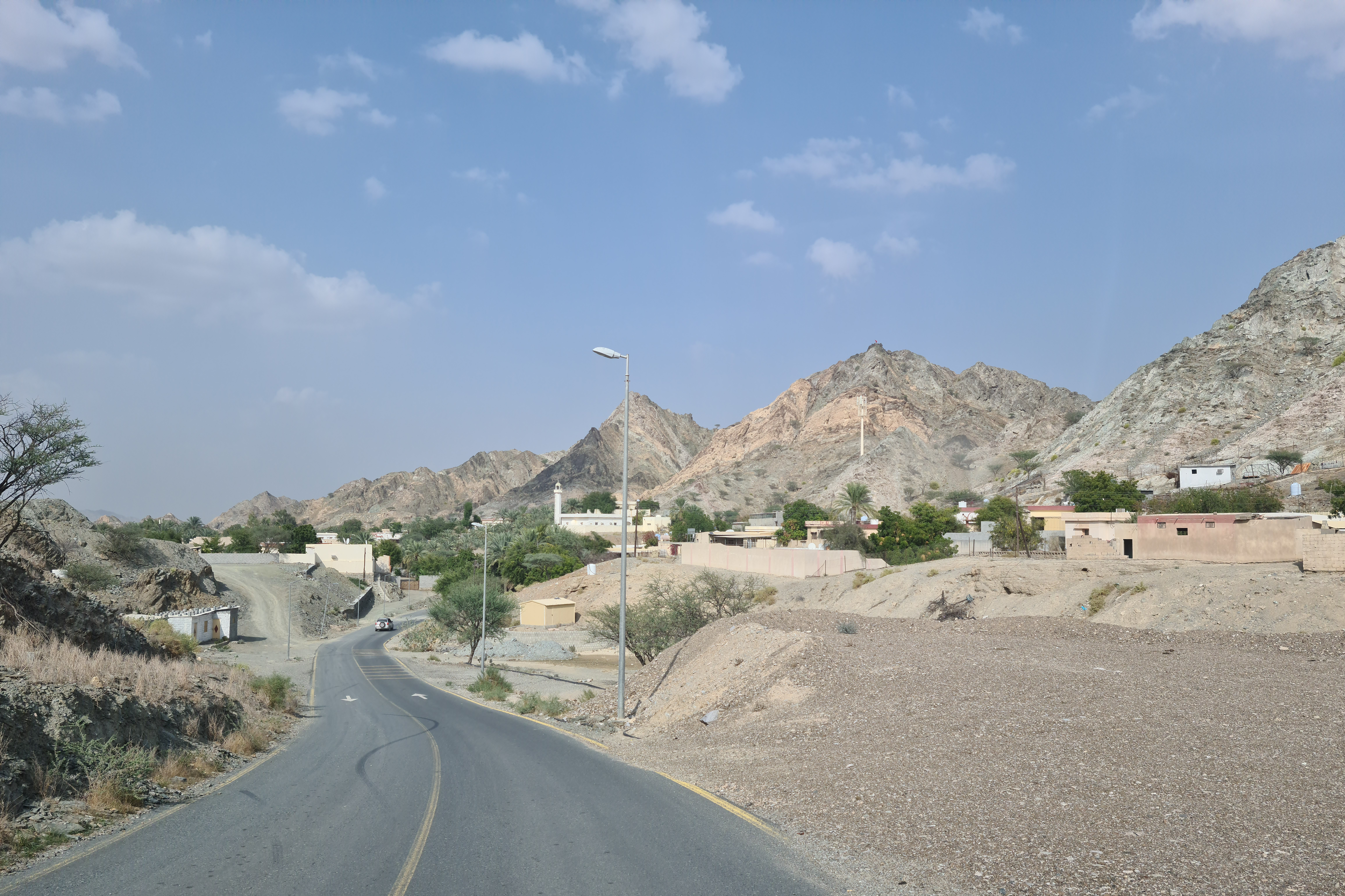

- Location within United Arab Emirates
- Coordinates: 25°24′13.8″N 56°10′4″E
- Country: United Arab Emirates
- Emirate: Fujairah

Tayyibah is a large village in the Hajar Mountains of Fujairah, United Arab Emirates. It is notable for its hiking trails, its Heritage Museum and the Al Qalaa Lodge, an Emirati heritage themed guest house.

== History ==
The village is situated at the head of the Wadi Tayyibah, which provided the principal link between the interior and Dibba on the East Coast before the metalled road between Masafi and Dibba was constructed by the Trucial Oman Scouts in 1960, using dynamite. A number of petroglyphs have been found in the area of the wadi.

Fighting broke out between the Sharqiyin residents of Tayyibah and members of the Mazari tribe from the nearby community of Asimah in May 1959, a conflict that resulted in the Ruler of Fujairah at the time, Mohammed bin Hamad Al Sharqi, having to pay compensation, or muatasham, of 400 Rupees to the Ruler of Ras Al Khaimah, Saqr bin Mohammed Al Qasimi, as he was in breach of the wayi (protection or safeguard) agreed between them – as well as reparations of 14,000 Rupees for the damage caused by his tribesmen.

The conflict, which resulted in the death of a man from Asimah and which was only quelled on the armed intervention of the Trucial Oman Scouts, rumbled on and in 1961 led to attacks on workers on the Trucial Oman Scouts' Masafi/Dibba road construction project by Tayyibah men.

In its heyday as an agricultural settlement, in the early 20th century, the farms of Tayyibah would provide seasonal work for men from the surrounding area.

== Modern Tayyibah ==
Today Tayyibah is a popular tourist destination and hiking spot, with a number of trails marked throughout the area. The area is agriculturally rich and is noted for its date palm groves. With some 75 families populating Tayyibah in 2009, a number of housing programs have greatly expanded the settlement in recent years with modern housing developing the village away from its traditional housing and core community.

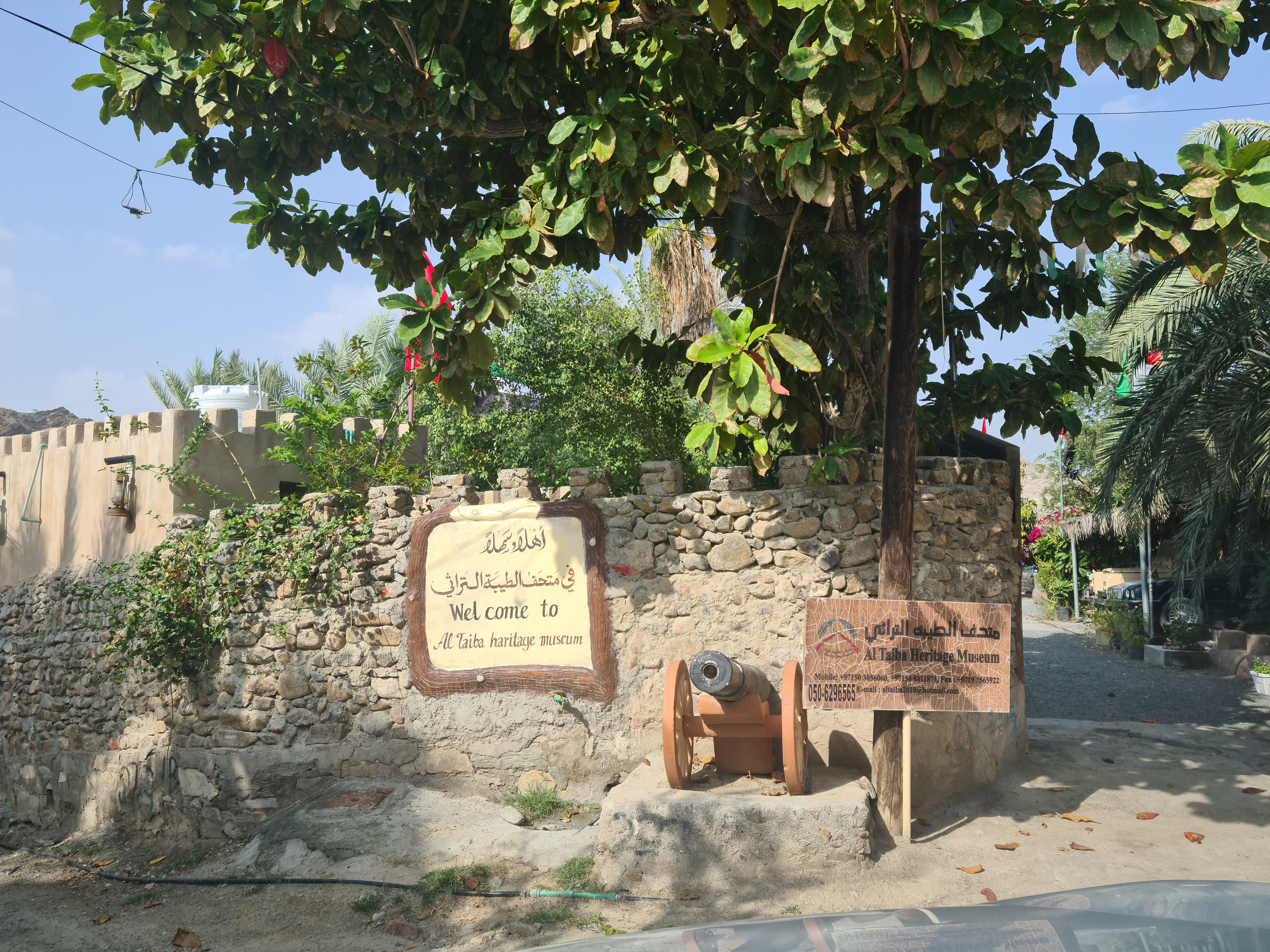
The Tayyibah Heritage Museum

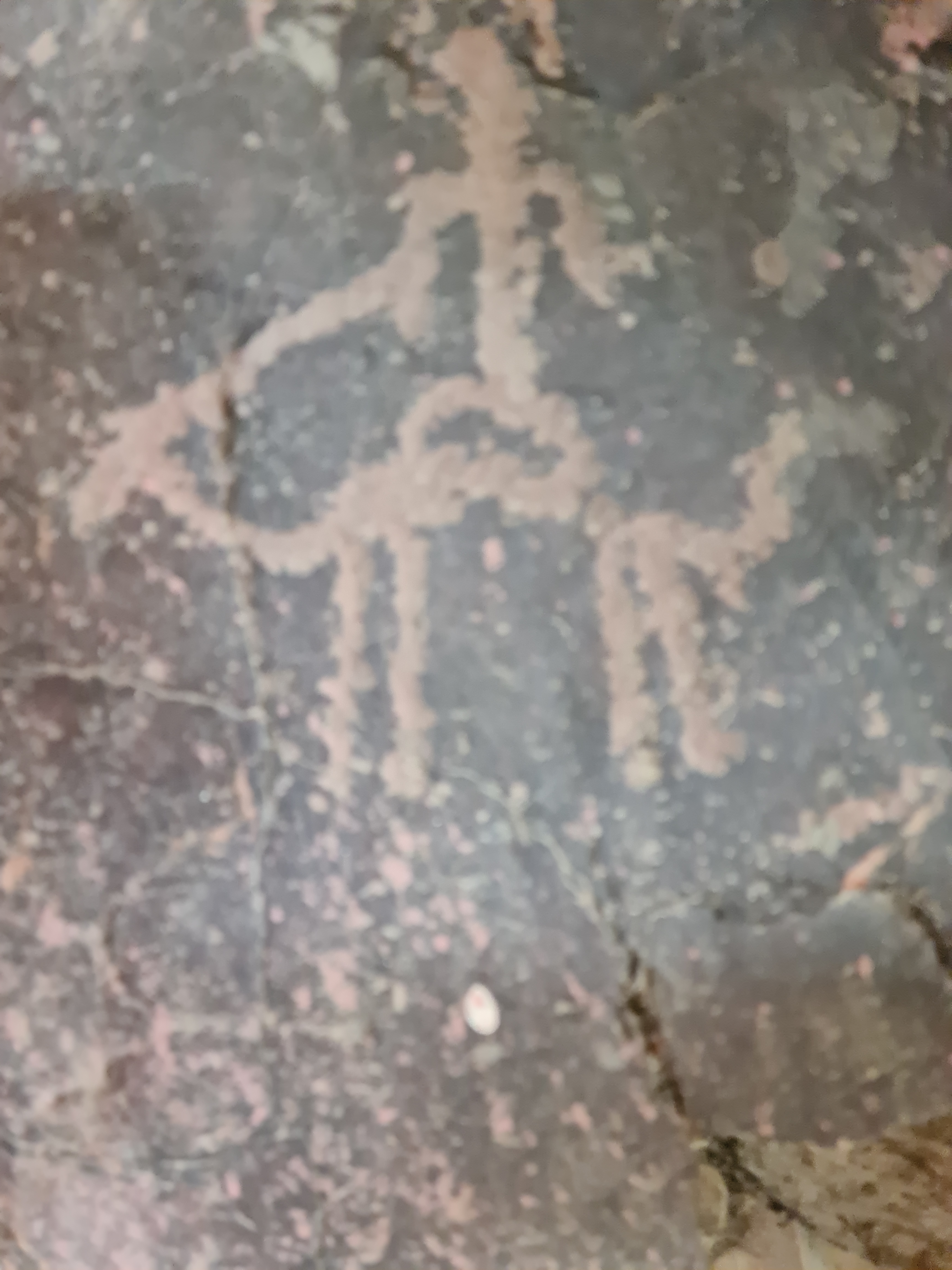
Petroglyph retrieved from the Wadi Tayyibah on display at the Tayyibah Heritage Museum

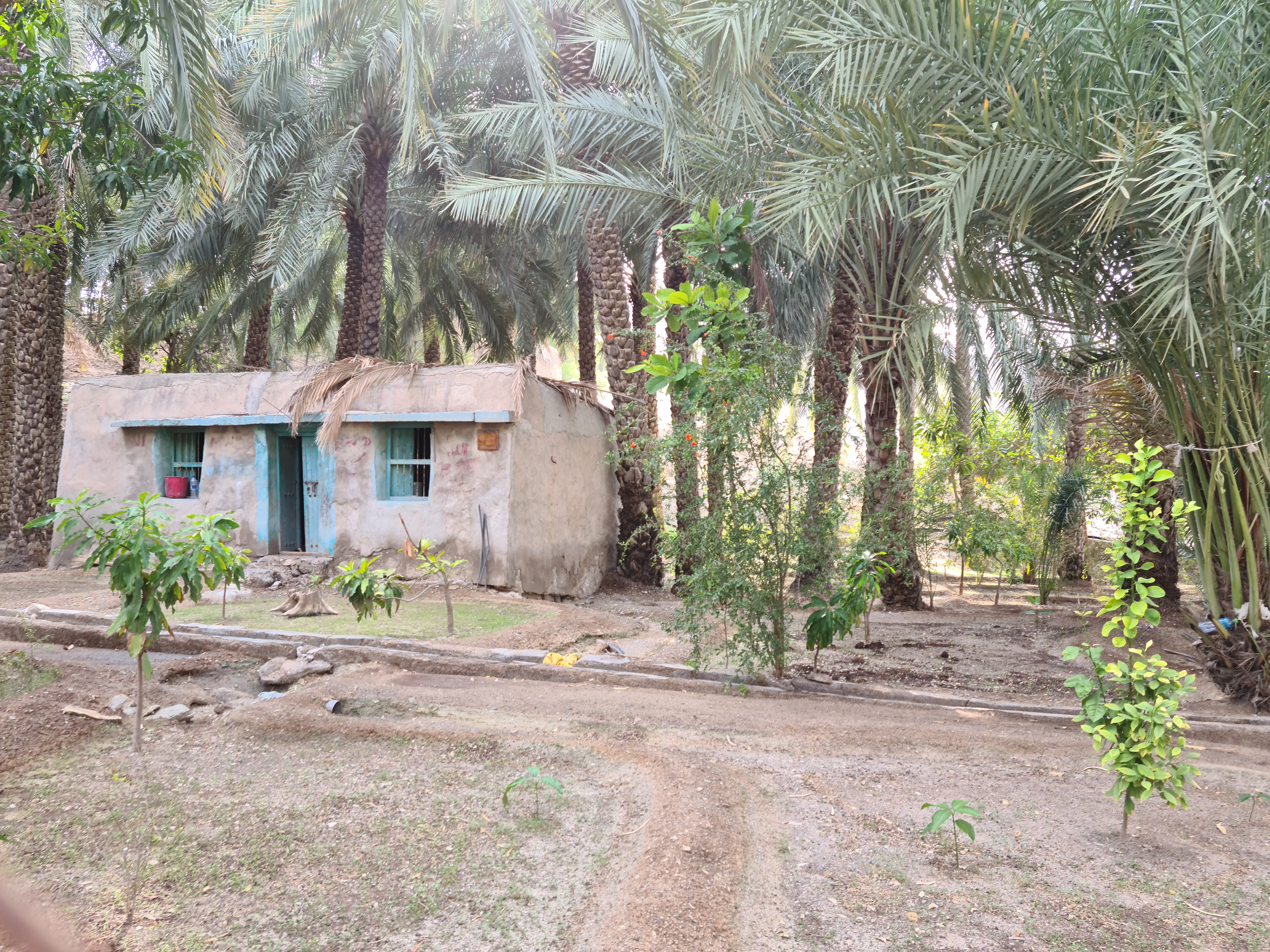
A date grove at a farm in Tayyibah, Fujairah. The bustan system of agriculture is used, irrigated by aflaj waterways
