= Wadi Tayyibah =

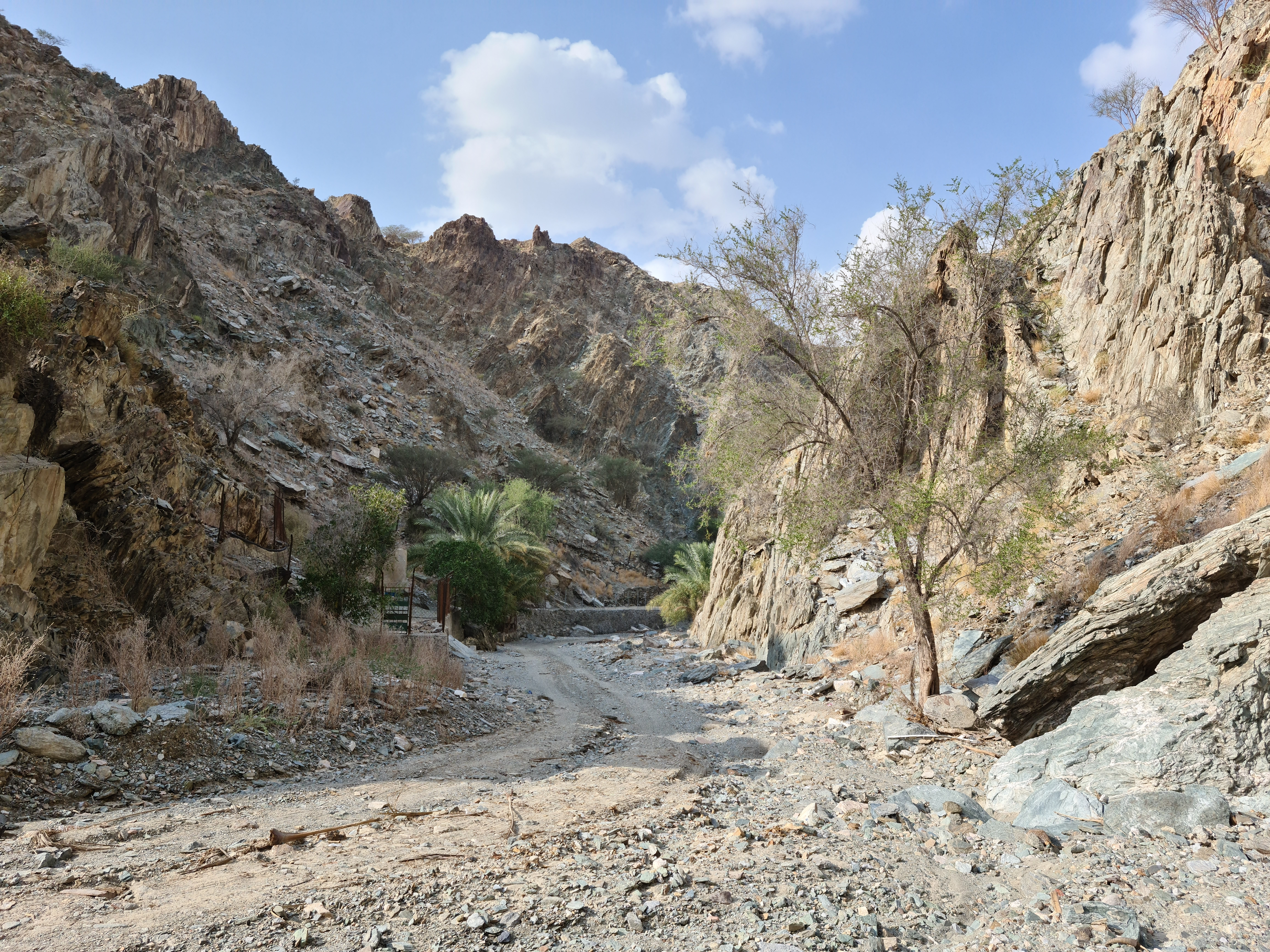

- Location within United Arab Emirates

Physical characteristics
- Mouth
  - coordinates: 25°28′38.5″N 56°10′51.3″E

Wadi Tayyibah is a seasonal watercourse, or wadi, in the Hajar Mountains of Fujairah, United Arab Emirates. It runs from the village of Tayyibah to join the Seih Dibba or Dibba Plain, where it fans out into the plain. Prior to 1960, Wadi Tayyibah provided the main route from Masafi to Dibba and sections of tarmac are still visible, particularly on the lower reaches of the wadi as it approaches the village of Al Hala.

The wadi was superseded as the main road to Dibba when the Trucial Oman Scouts built a new road in 1960, dynamiting passes through the mountains. The road was controversial in the area as it deprived the people of the village of Tayyibah of revenue from passing traffic and fighting broke out between the Sharqiyin residents of Tayyibah and members of the Mazari tribe from the nearby community of Wadi Asimah, with men from Tayyibah attacking workers on the new road project.

The Wadi was traditionally an area of intensive agricultural development, providing seasonal employment for men in the area. It remains noted for its date palm groves. It is a popular tourist destination, with a number of hiking trails. In its heyday as an agricultural settlement, in the early 20th century, the farms of Tayyibah would provide seasonal work for men from the surrounding area. Today Wadi Tayyibah is a popular tourist destination and hiking spot, with a number of trails marked throughout the area.

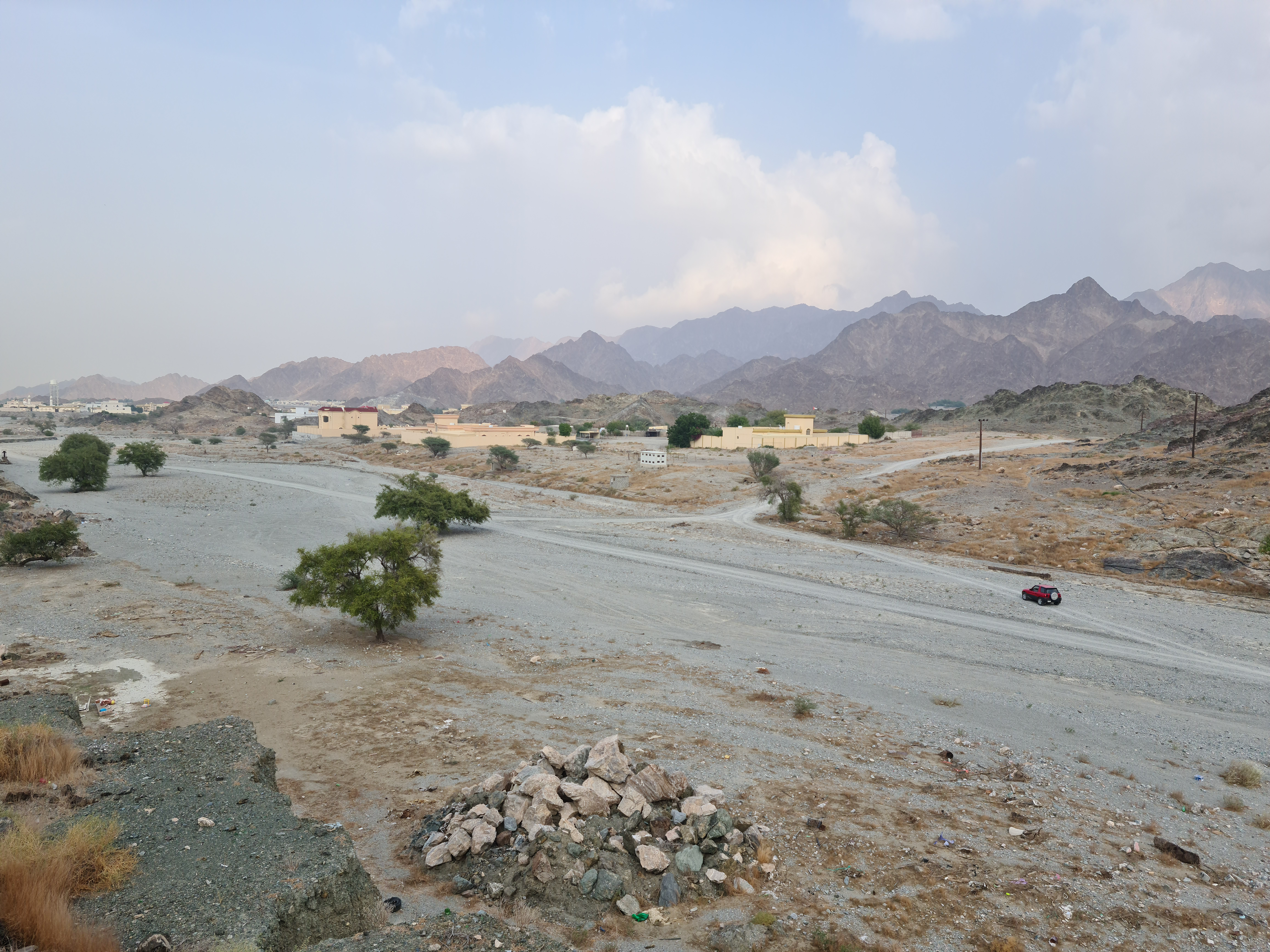
The lower reaches of the Wadi Tayyibah as it combines with other watercourses to form the Seih Dibba, or Dibba plain.

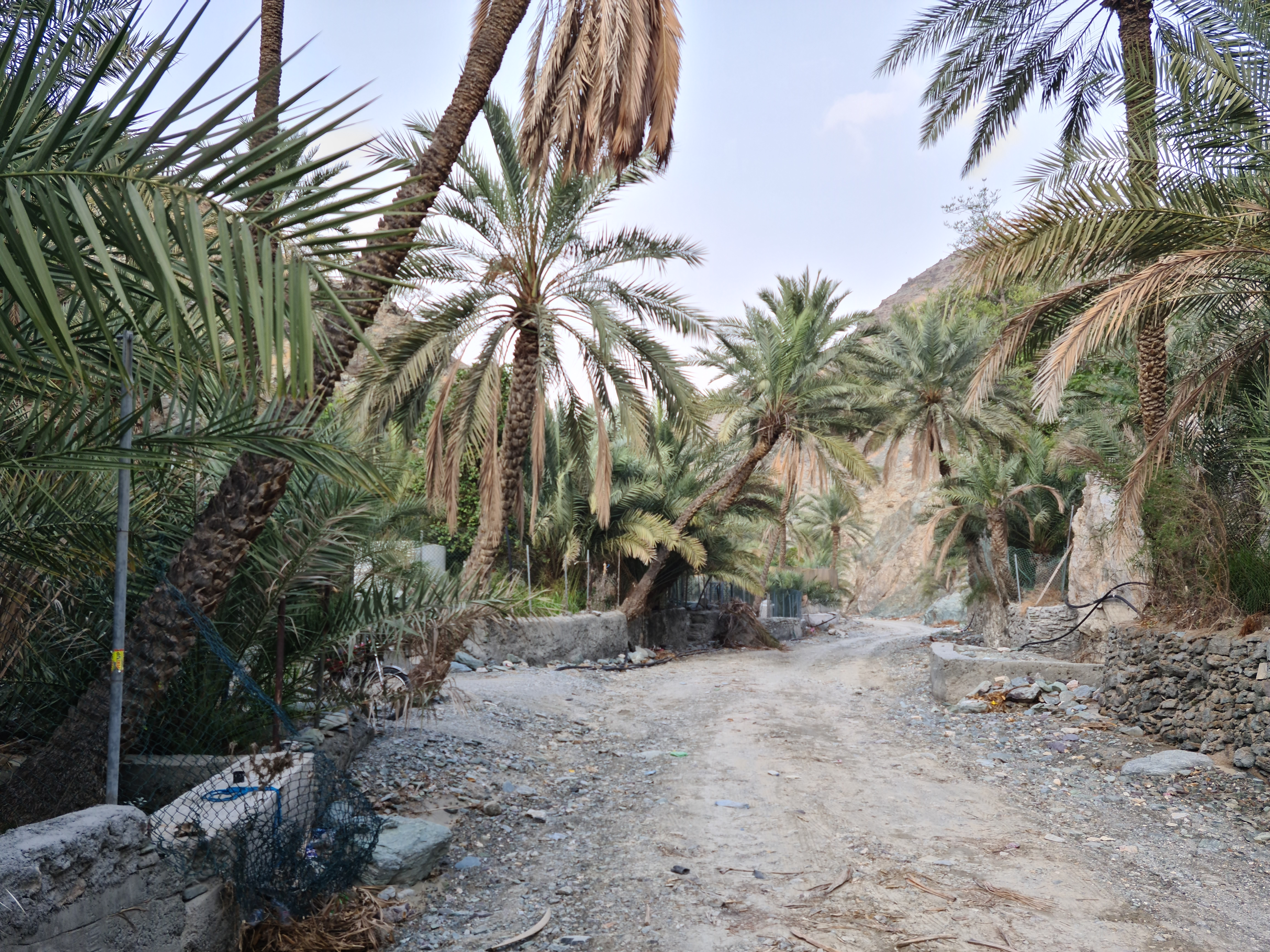
Date palms in the Wadi Tayyibah

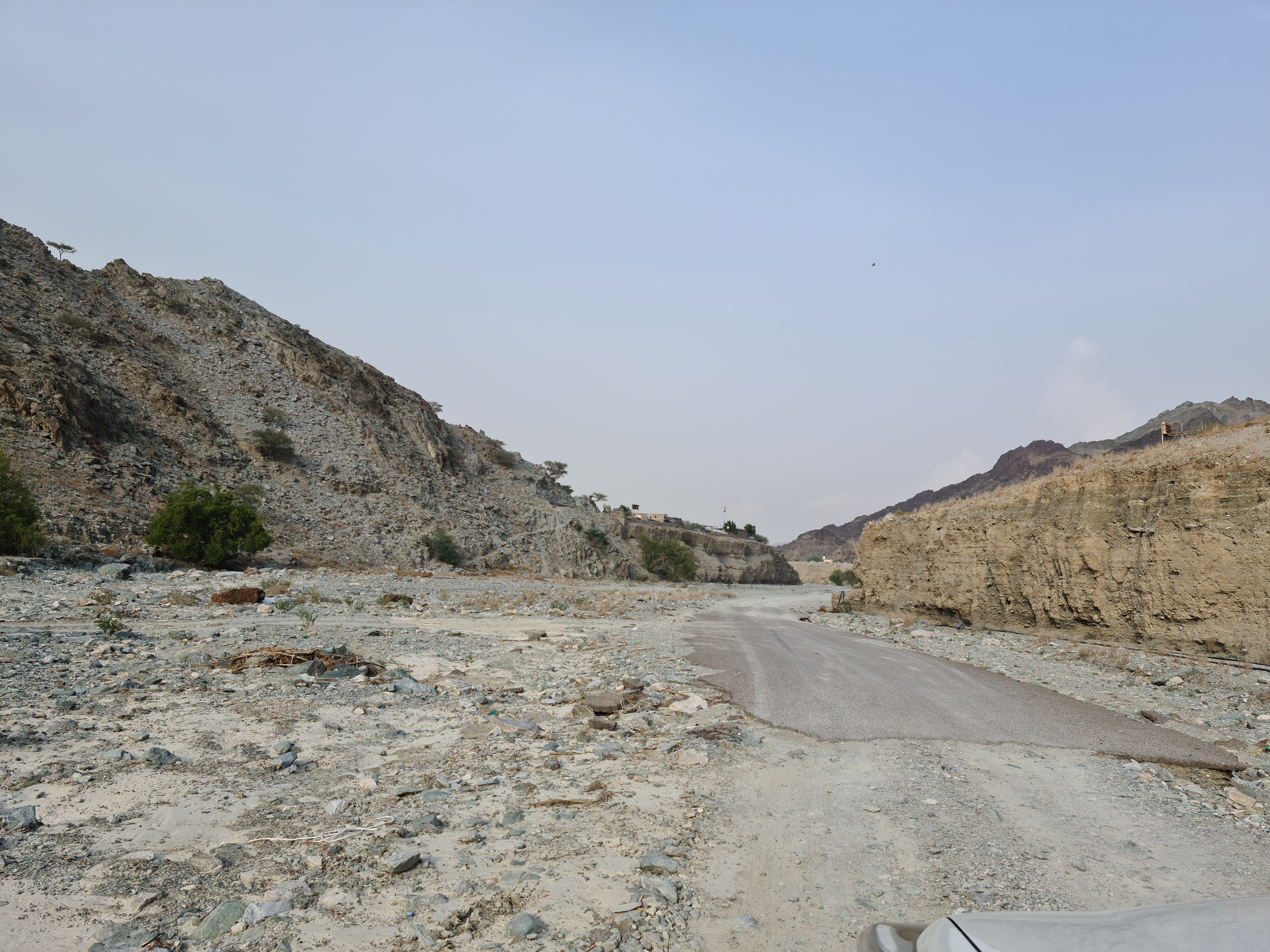
Wadi Tayyibah, with a stretch of the old tarmac road visible in the wadi bed.

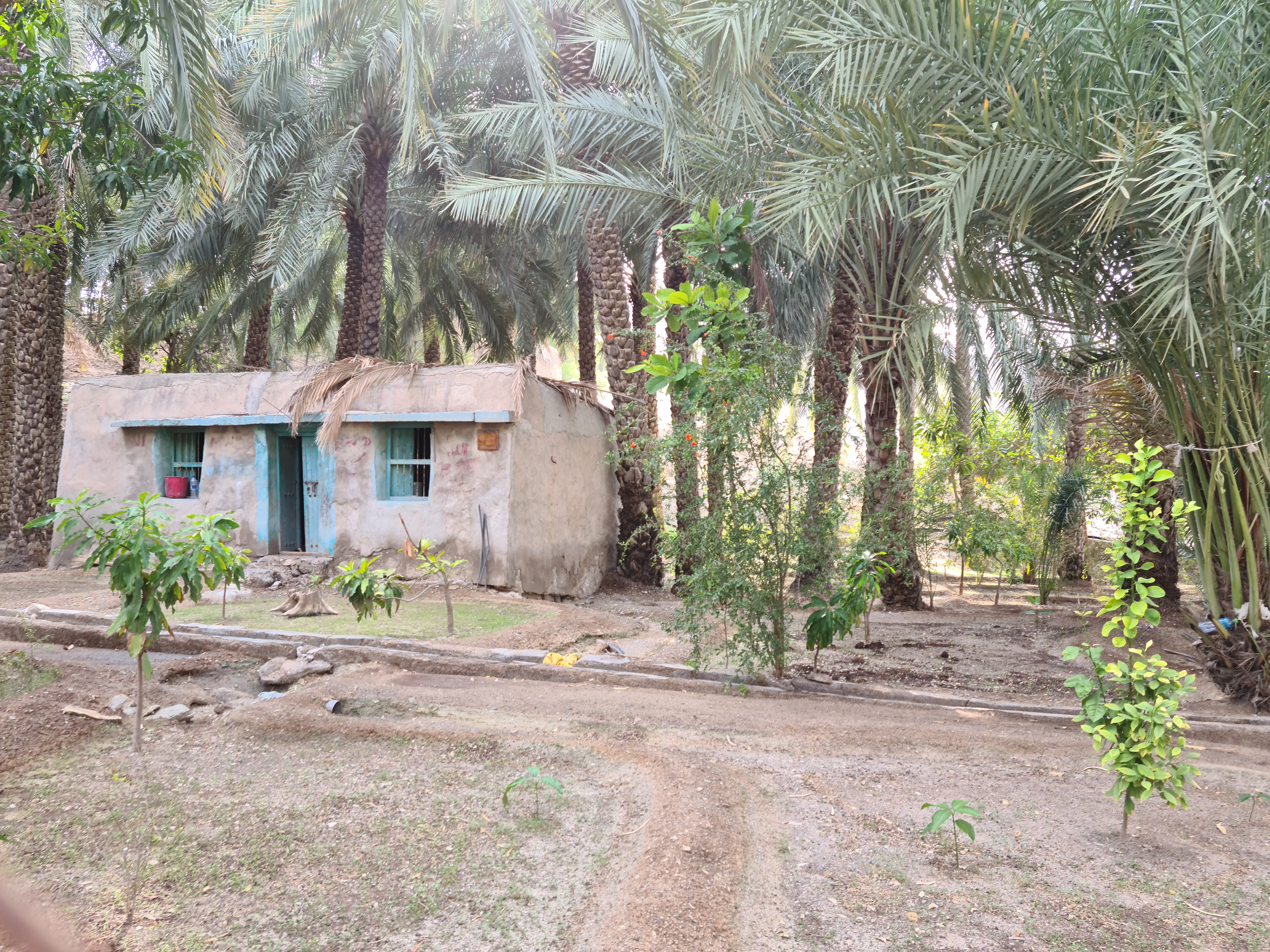
A date grove in a farm at Tayyibah.

== See also ==
- List of wadis of the United Arab Emirates
