= Wadi Sidr =

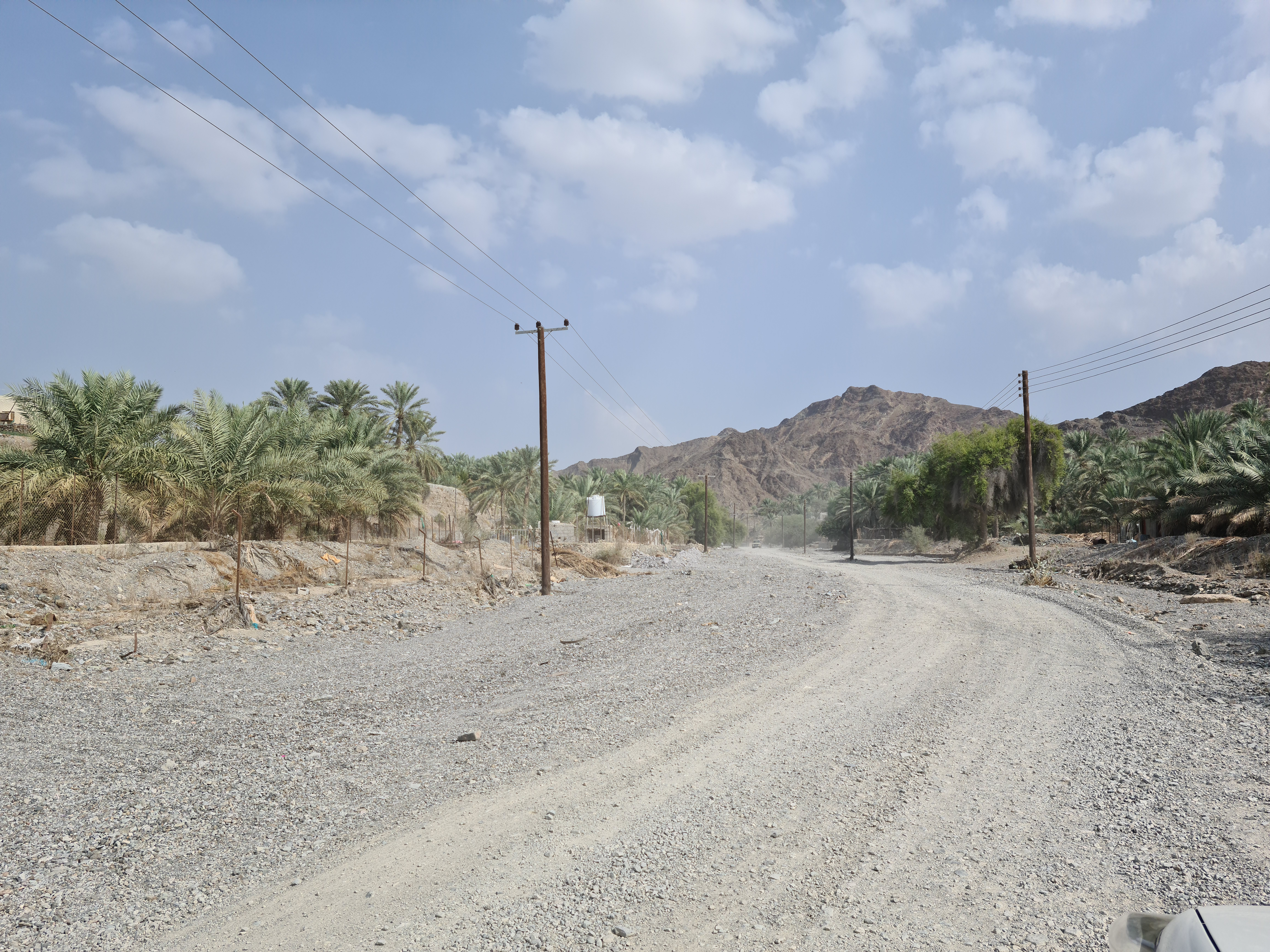

- Location within United Arab Emirates

Physical characteristics
- Mouth
  - coordinates: 25°25′16.9″N 56°05′48″E

Wadi Sidr is a seasonal watercourse, or wadi, in the Hajar Mountains of Fujairah, United Arab Emirates. It runs in a south-westerly direction from the village of Wadi Sidr, where it is dammed by the Wadi Sidr Dam, constructed in 2001, to the confluence of the Wadi Asimah with the Wadi Fara.

The wadi takes its name from the sidr tree, Ziziphus spina-christi, common in the Hajar Mountains and prized for the honey produced from its flowers. It is a fertile agricultural area traditionally home to members of the Mazari tribe. It is a popular hiking destination.

== Flooding ==
Although all of the Hajar Mountain wadis are prone to flash floods, Wadi Sidr is exceptionally so and is cited as having the highest potential for flash flooding (alongside Ain Al Faydah in Jebel Hafeet) in the Emirates. Wadi Sidr is also the watercourse with maximum flooding in the Emirates.

Geologically, Wadi Sidr passes from areas of sedimentary rock through metamorphic and altered gabbroic rocks, complicated by thrust planes.

== Gallery ==
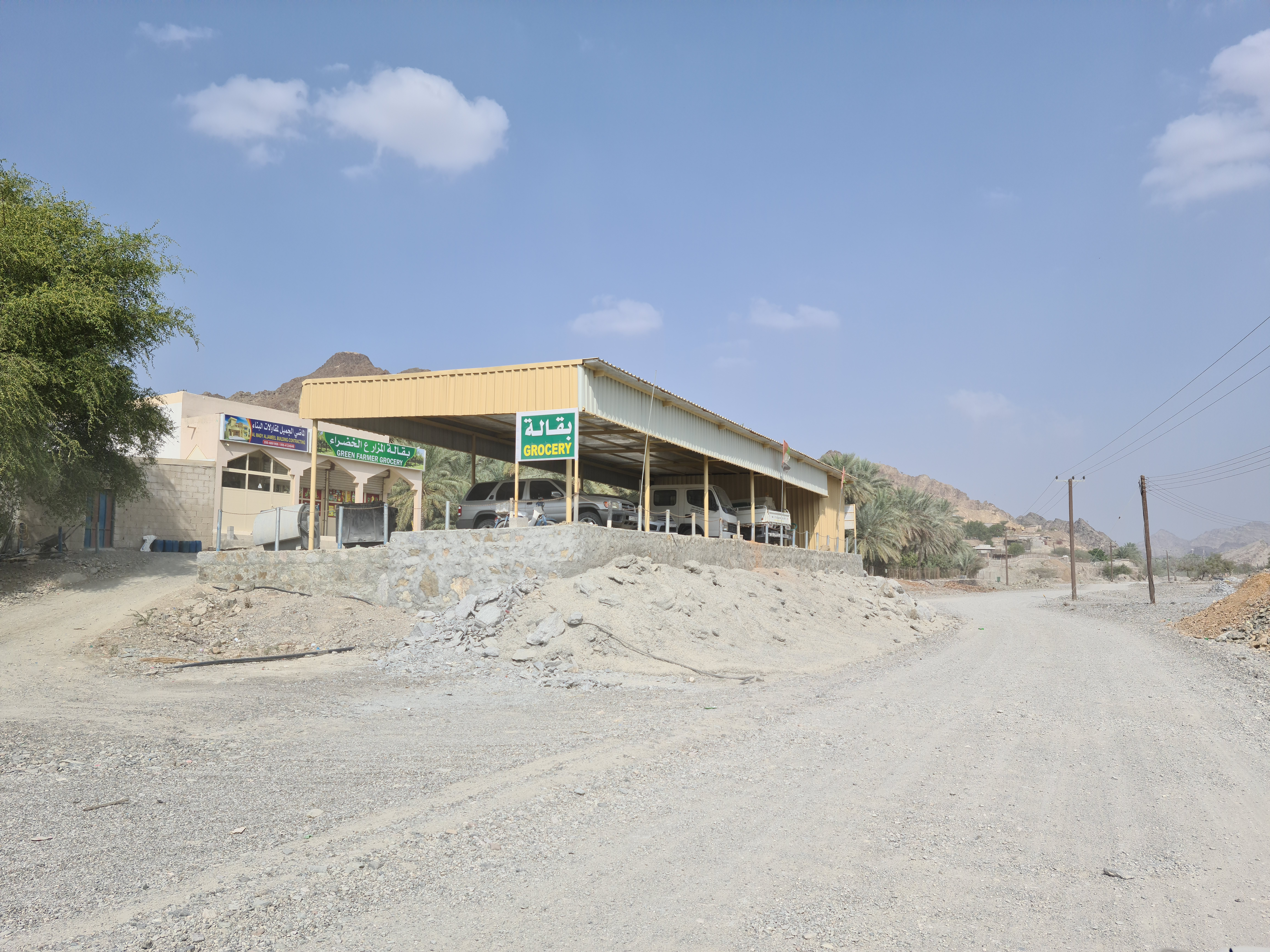
A lone Wadi Sidr grocery

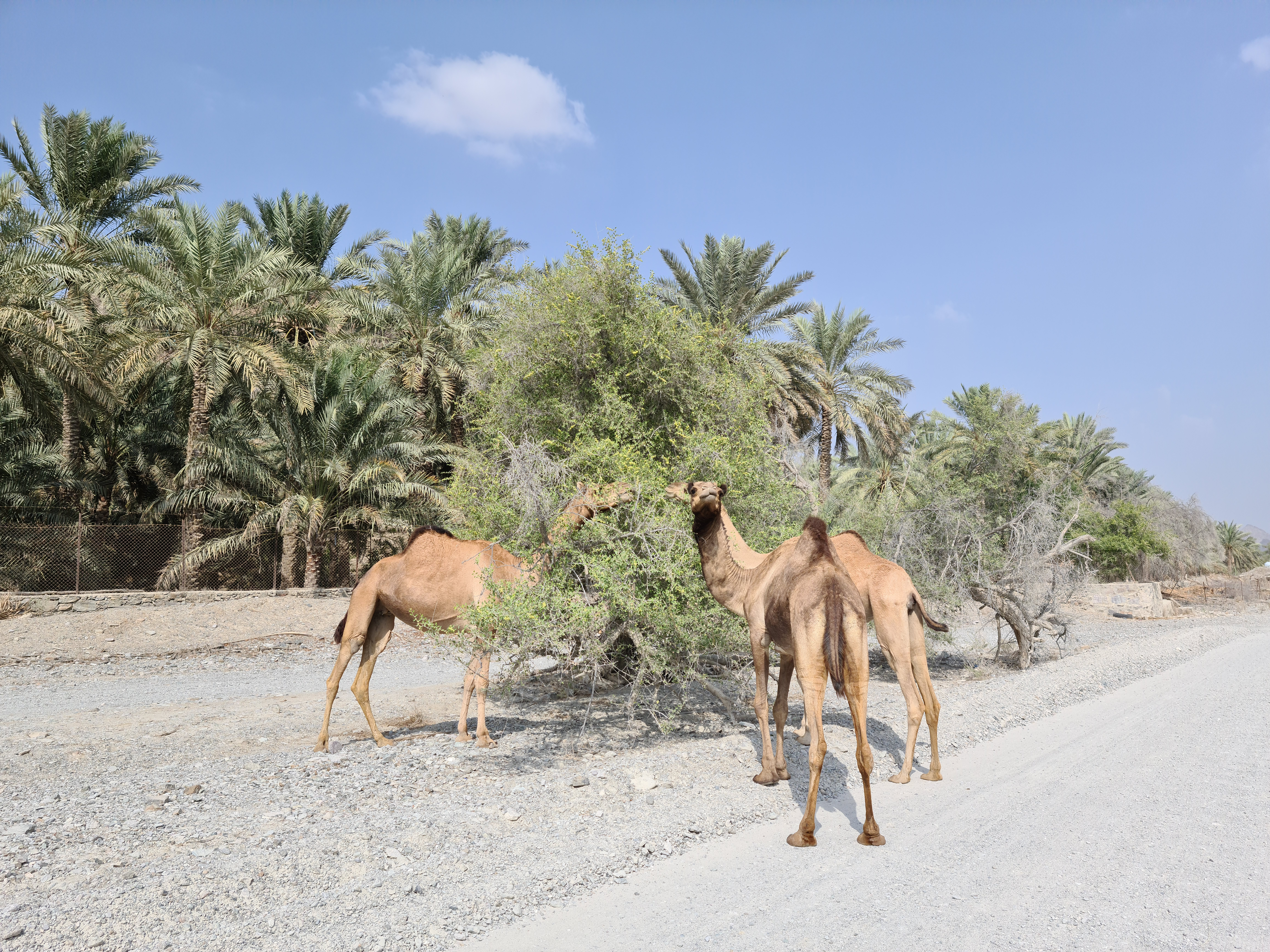
Camels feeding on ghaf in the Wadi Sidr

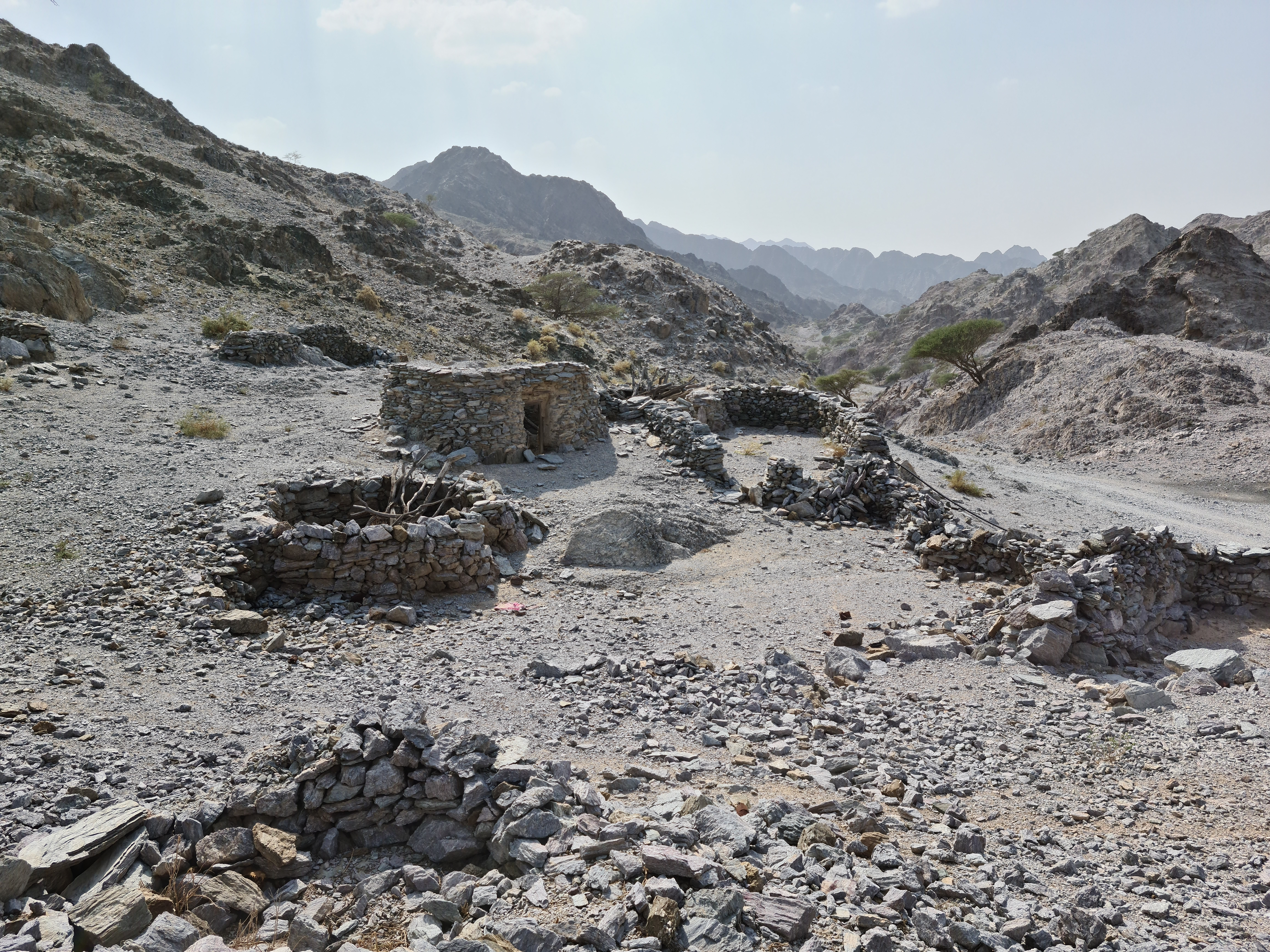
An abandoned village off the Wadi Sidr

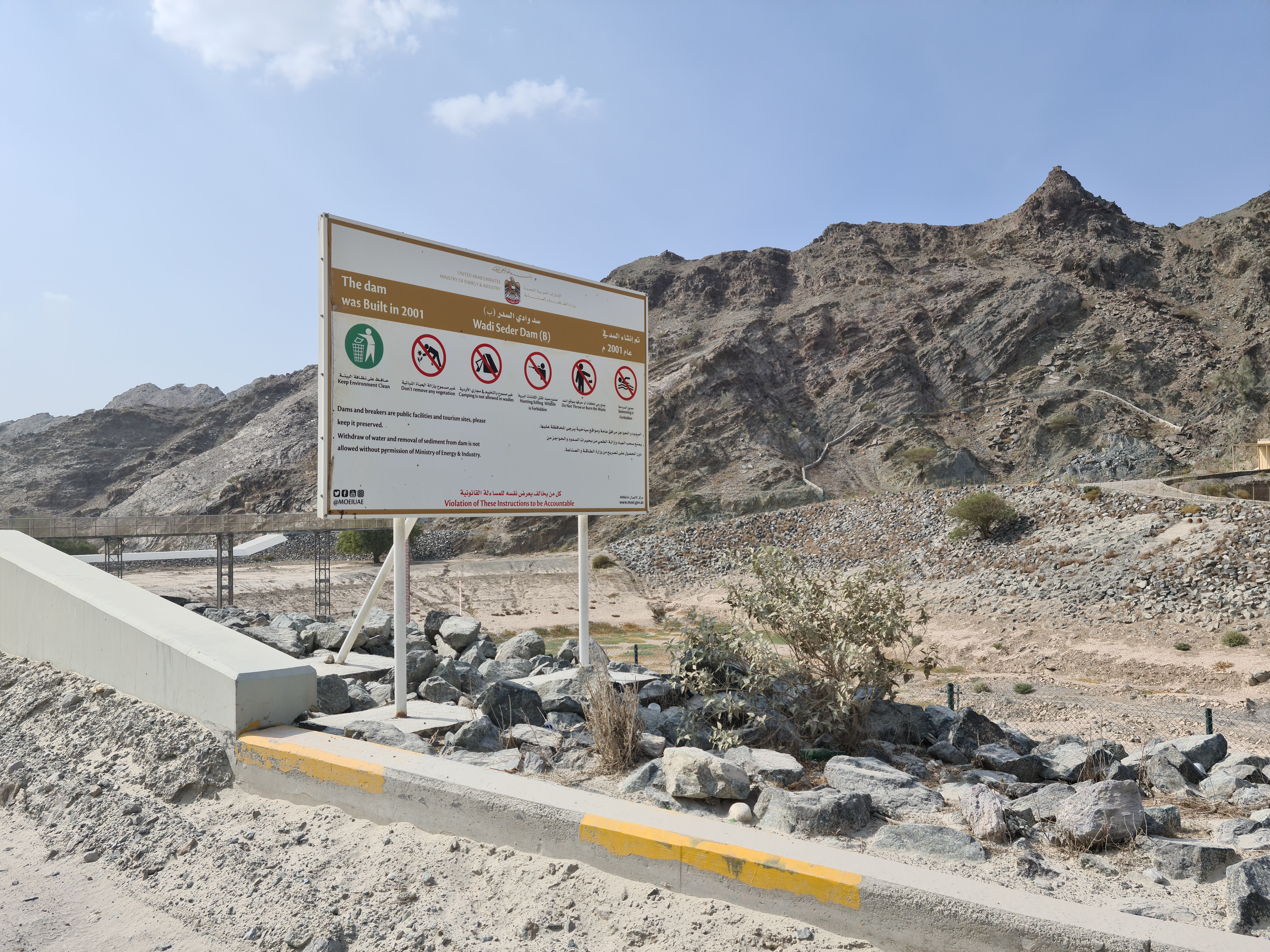
The Wadi Sidr Dam, constructed in 2001

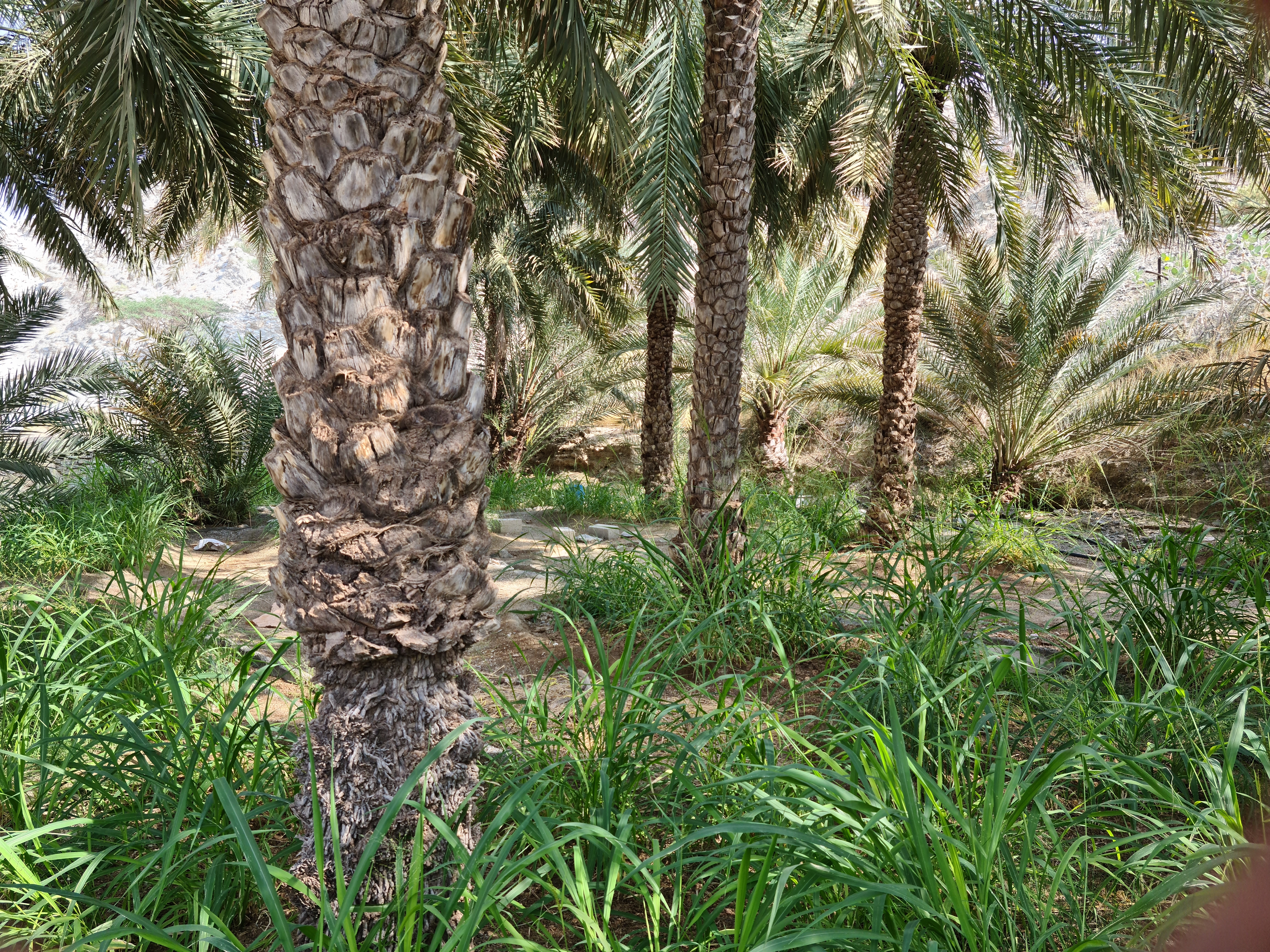
A date grove in the Wadi Sidr

== See also ==
- List of wadis of the United Arab Emirates
