= Wadi Fara =

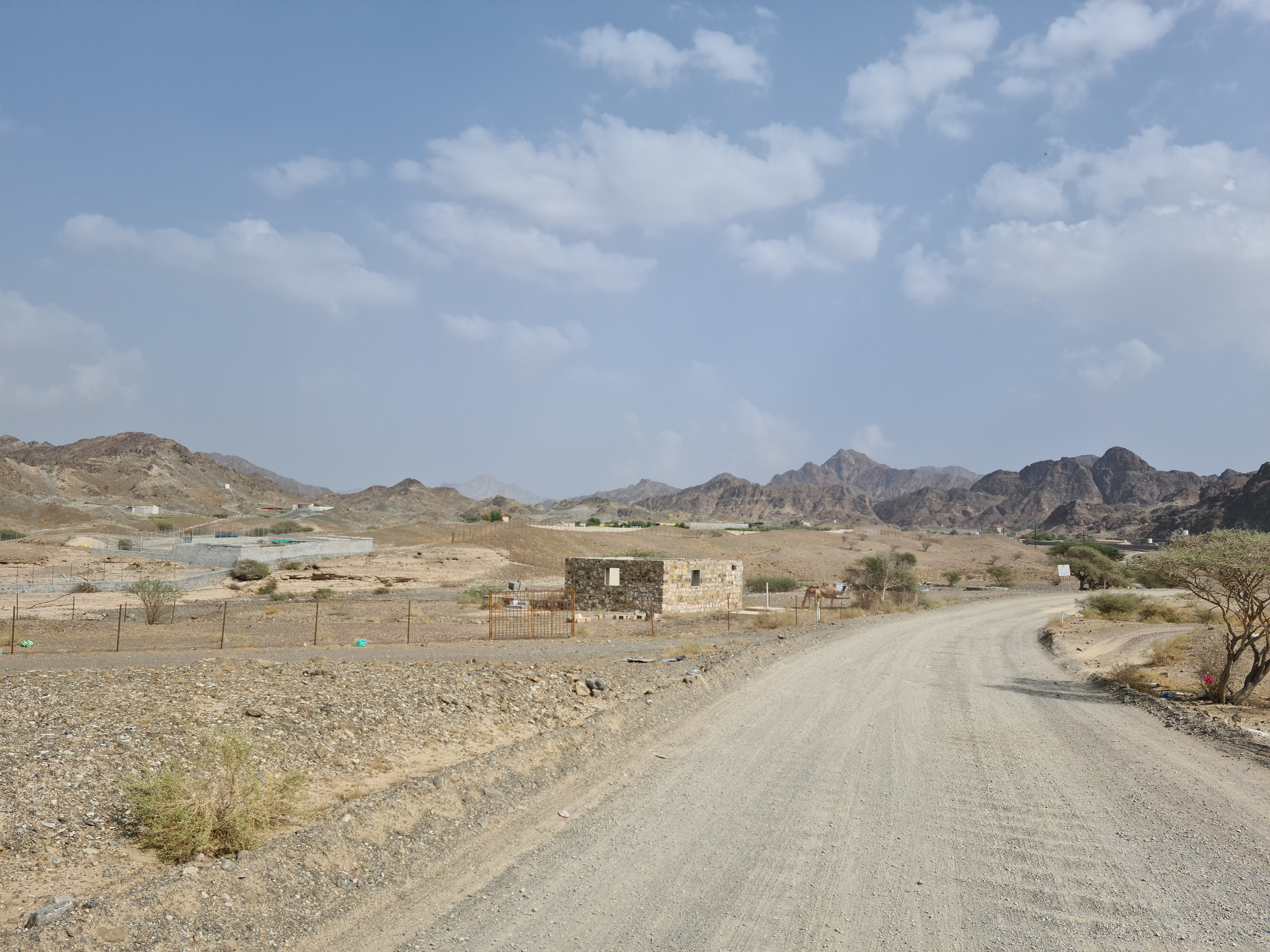

- Location within United Arab Emirates

Physical characteristics
- Mouth
  - coordinates: 25°24′26.5″N 56°03′53.7″E

Wadi Fara is a seasonal watercourse, or wadi, in Ras Al Khaimah, United Arab Emirates. It runs from the confluence of the Wadi Asimah and Wadi Sidr, to the village of Ghayl.

A wide and fertile wadi, its rich wildlife includes a novel species of diving beetle, Hydroglyphus sinuspersicus, which was first discovered and documented by a joint Czech/Austrian team working in the Wadi Fara in 2009.

The wadi is traditionally settled by members of the Mazari tribe and has a number of historic watchtowers, old villages and farms. A survey of the area carried out in 1955 found 25 households and some 1,200 date palms in the wadi.

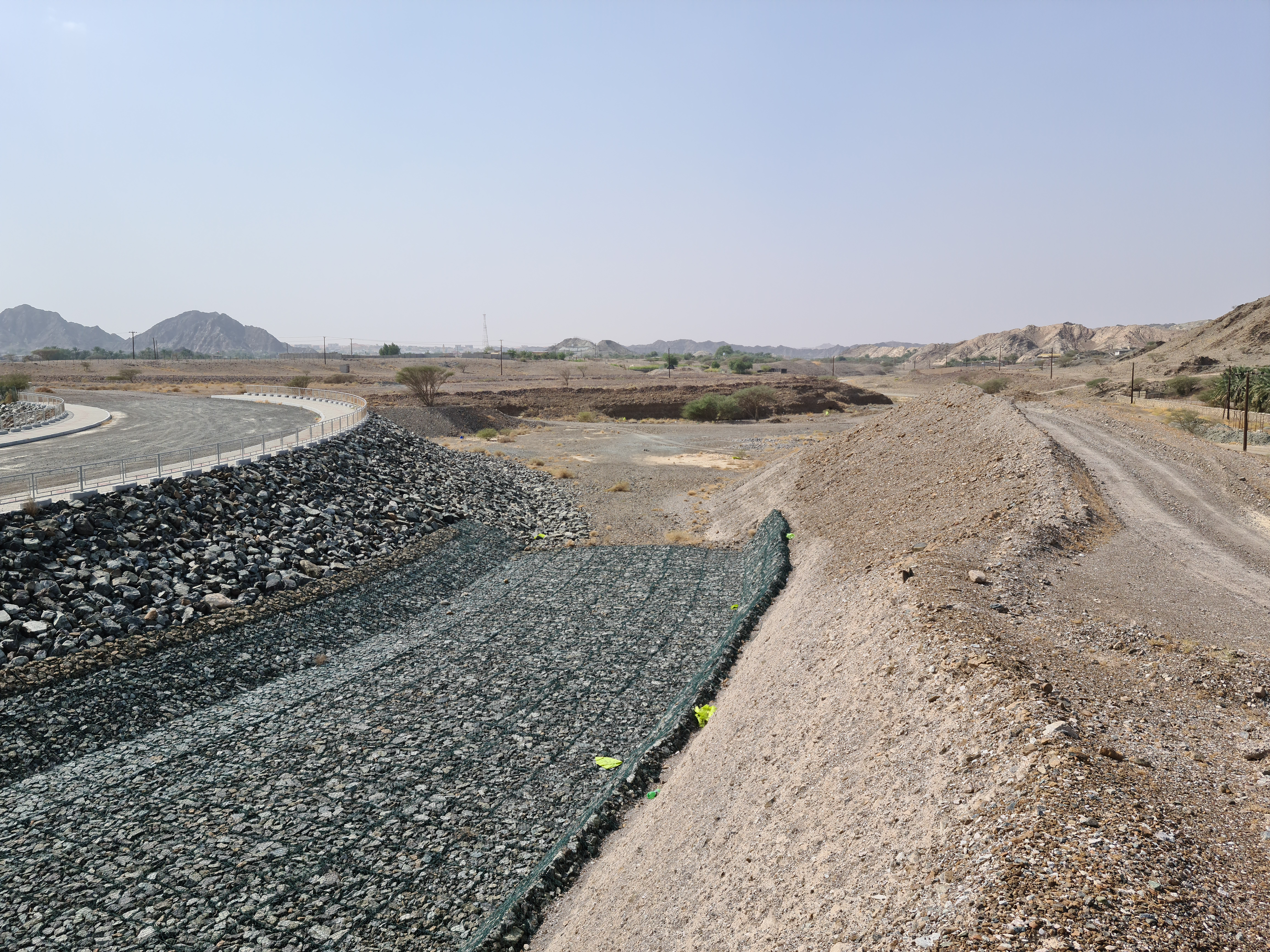
The Al Daoudi dam in the Wadi Fara

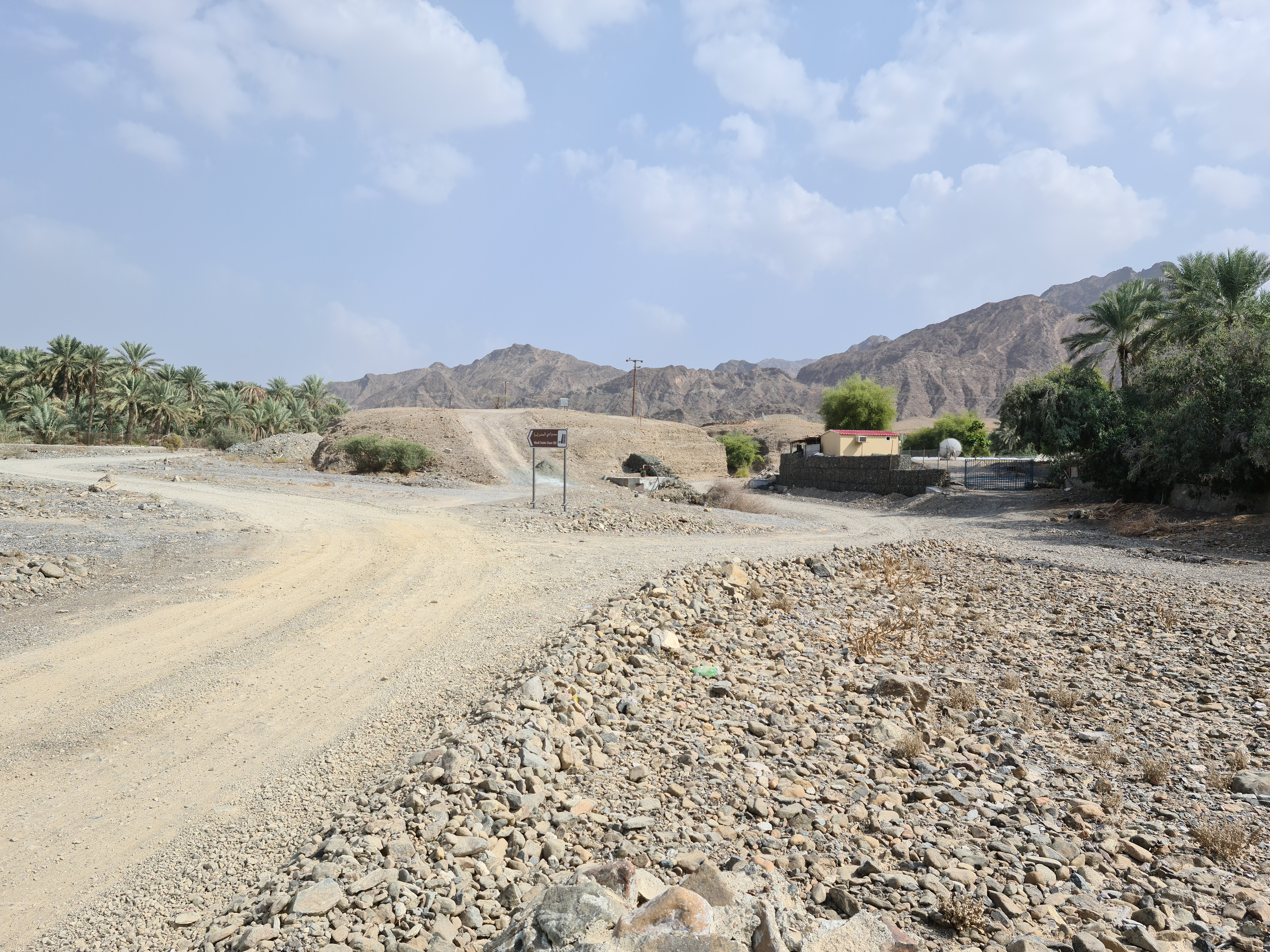
The confluence of the Wadi Fara with Wadi Asimah (right) and Wadi Sidr (left)

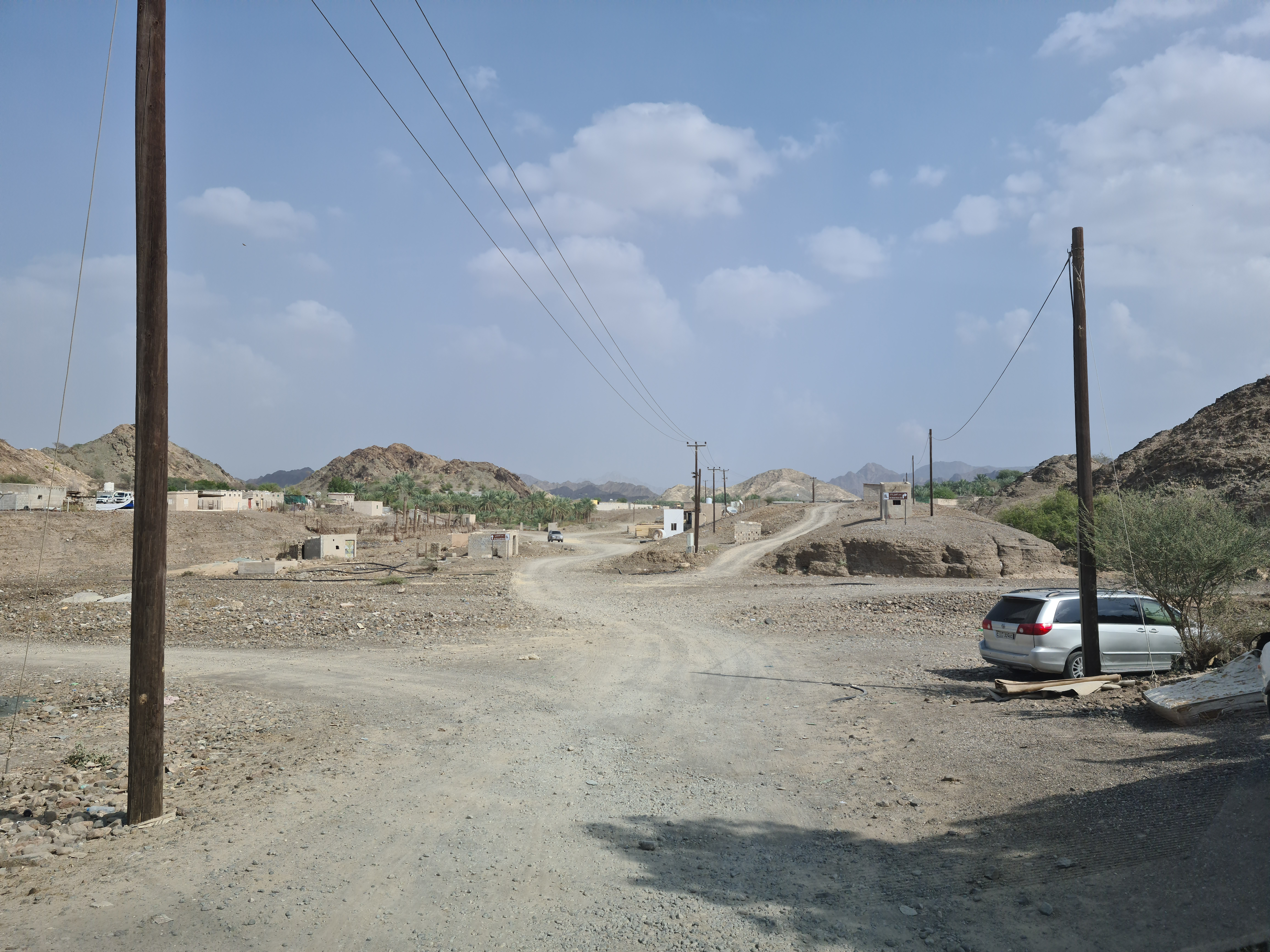
The Wadi Fara emerging at Ghayl, Ras Al Khaimah

== See also ==
- List of wadis of the United Arab Emirates
