= Wadi Kub =

Wadi Kub Wādī Kūb
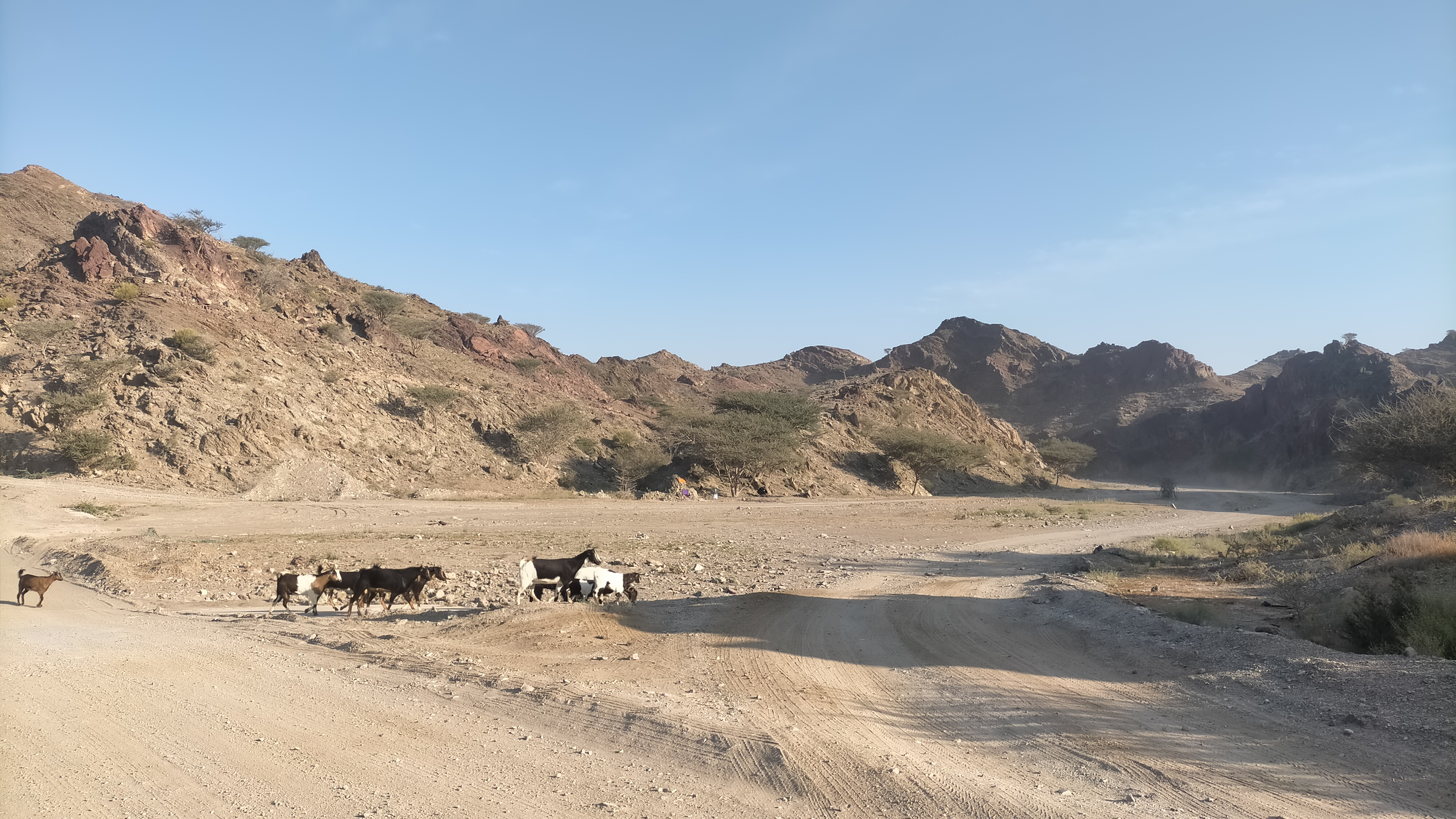
- Wadi Kub. Most of the wadi is occupied by the Al Mesrah Road

- Location within United Arab Emirates Location within Persian Gulf Location within West and Central Asia
- Native name: وادي كوب (Arabic)

Location
- Country: United Arab Emirates
- Emirate: Ras Al Khaimah
- Emirate: Fujairah

Physical characteristics
- Source: On the southern slope of the ridge that borders to the north the town of Al Jaroof / Al Jurouf (in Arabic: الجروف), in the Emirate of Fujairah.
  - elevation: 542 m (1,778 ft)
- Mouth: in the Wadi Mu'taridah / Wadi Mutarid, shortly before the town of Saram, at the foot of Jabal Satif (367 m (1,204 ft)), in the Emirate of Fujairah.
  - coordinates: 25°39′16.34″N 55°59′58.13″E
  - elevation: 156 m (512 ft)
- Length: 17 km (11 mi)
- Basin size: 34.14 km^{2} (13.18 mi^{2})

Basin features
- River system: Wadi Mu'taridah / Wadi Mutarid
- Tributaries
  - left: Wadi Lil, Wadi Suftah
  - right: Wadi Al Yanhah, Wadi As Siwefah

Wadi Kub (Arabic: وادي كوب, romanized: Wādī Kūb), is a dry valley or river with intermittent flow, which flows almost exclusively during the rainy season, located northeast of the United Arab Emirates, in the emirates of Fujairah and Emirate of Ras Al Khaimah.

It belongs to the inner drainage basin of the Wadi Mu'taridah / Wadi Mutarid / Wadi Al Mithaddim (65 km^{2} (25 mi^{2})), of which it is a tributary on the left, and extends through a sub-basin of 34.14 km^{2} (13.18 mi^{2}). It limits to the north with the Wadi Tawiyaen / Wādī Ţawīyayn basin, and with the sub-basins of the Wadi Mu'taridah / Wadi Mutarid and the Wadi Al Himriyyah; to the east with the watershed that defines the watercourses that flow into the Persian Gulf and those that flow into the Gulf of Oman, and with the Wadi Basseirah hydrographic basin; and to the south and west with the drainage basin of the Wadi Mawrid, although some authors consider that the bordering basin to the south is that of the Wādī Adhan / Wadi Idhn.

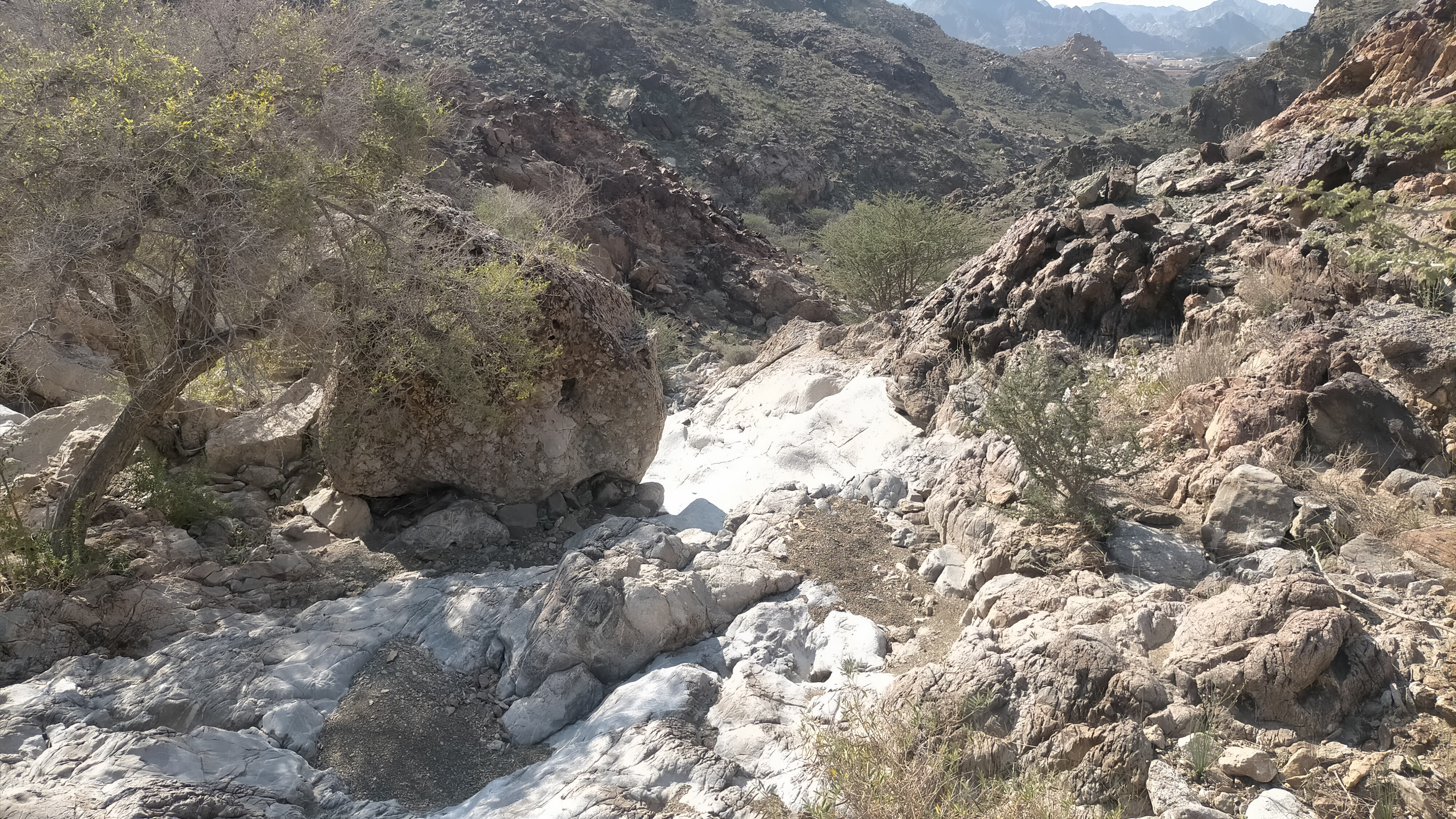
Upper course of the eastern arm of the Wadi Kub, in its source area, in the Emirate of Fujaira

The source of the main channel of the Wadi Kub is located on the southern slope of the ridge that borders to the north the town of Al Jaroof / Al Jurouf (in Arabic: الجروف), in the Emirate of Fujairah, and follows a course of approximately 17 km (11 mi) until its mouth in the Wadi Mu'taridah / Wadi Mutarid, shortly before the town of Saram, at the foot of Jabal Satif (367 m (1,204 ft)), in the Emirate of Fujairah.

The entire Wadi Kub area has historically been, and continues to be today, an eminently agricultural and livestock region, with towns and villages scattered along its main course and its many tributaries.

== Course ==
In its upper course, the wadi is formed by two arms of similar length and flow, which originate at approximately an altitude of 542 m (1,778 ft); they border Al Jaroof to the east and west, respectively; and converge to the south of this town, defining the main channel, which initially follows the direction from northeast to southwest.

Two kilometers after the exit of Al Jaroof, past the place known as Sidrat al Qorah, the Wadi Kub receives from the right the waters of one of its main tributaries: the Wadi Al Yanhah, which also originates, like the neighboring Wadi Al Himriyyah, on the southern slope of Jabal Huq (629 m (2,064 ft)).

Very few meters after this confluence, the first of four dams on the Wadi Kub was built in 2013, intended to feed the underground water resources, essential for the agriculture of the region, and to reduce damage due to possible floods, and which is identified with the name of Wadi Kub Breaker (1).

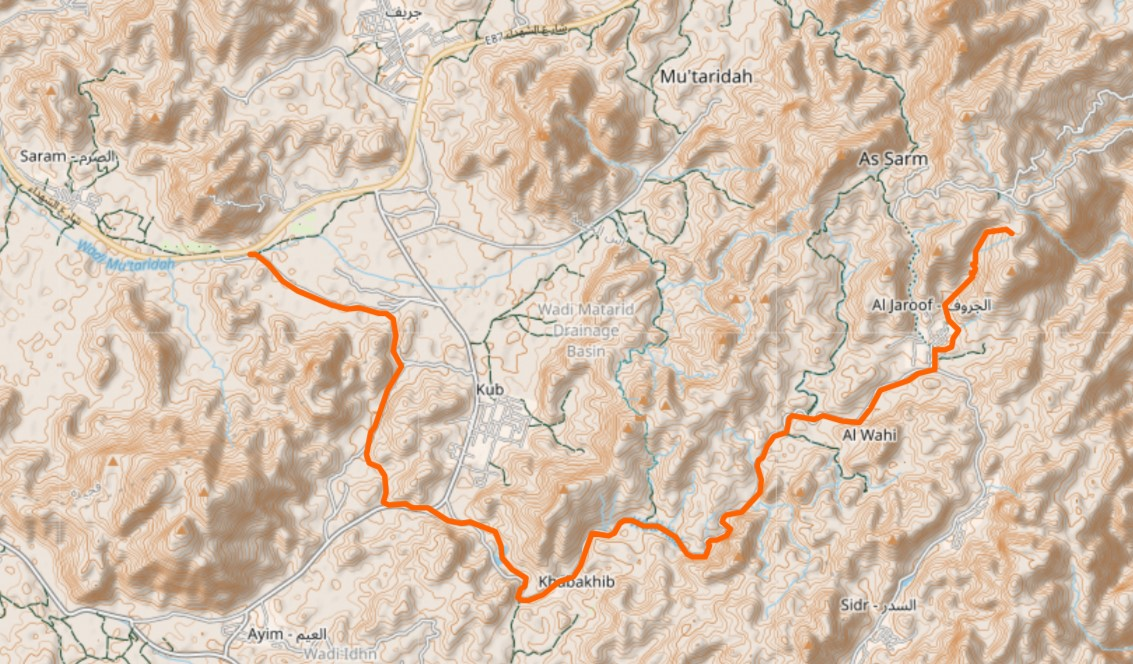
Wadi Kub course map. Map from OpenStreetMap (CyclOSM)

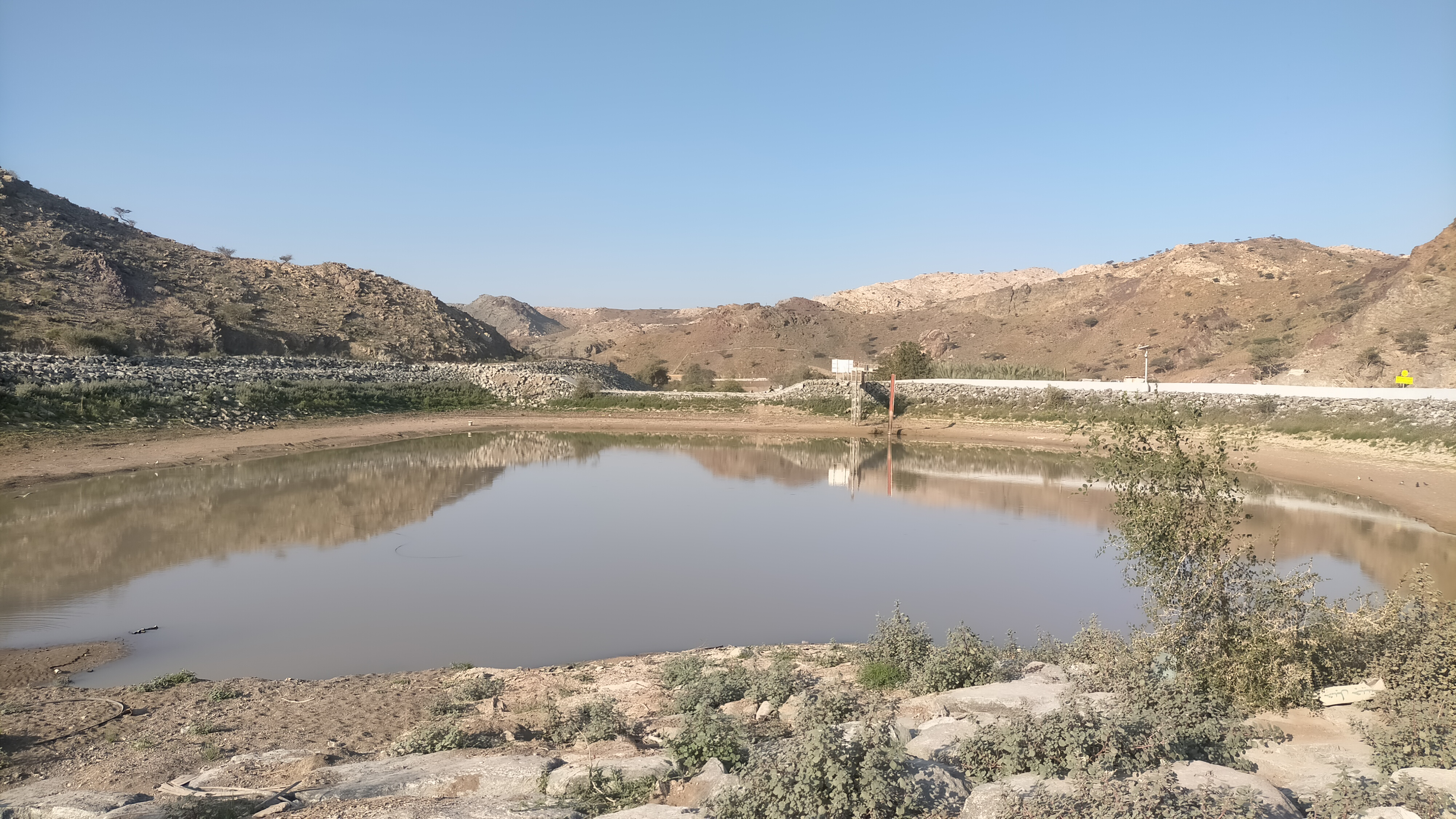
Wadi Kub Breaker (1). One of the dams built in 2013 along the Wadi Kub channel

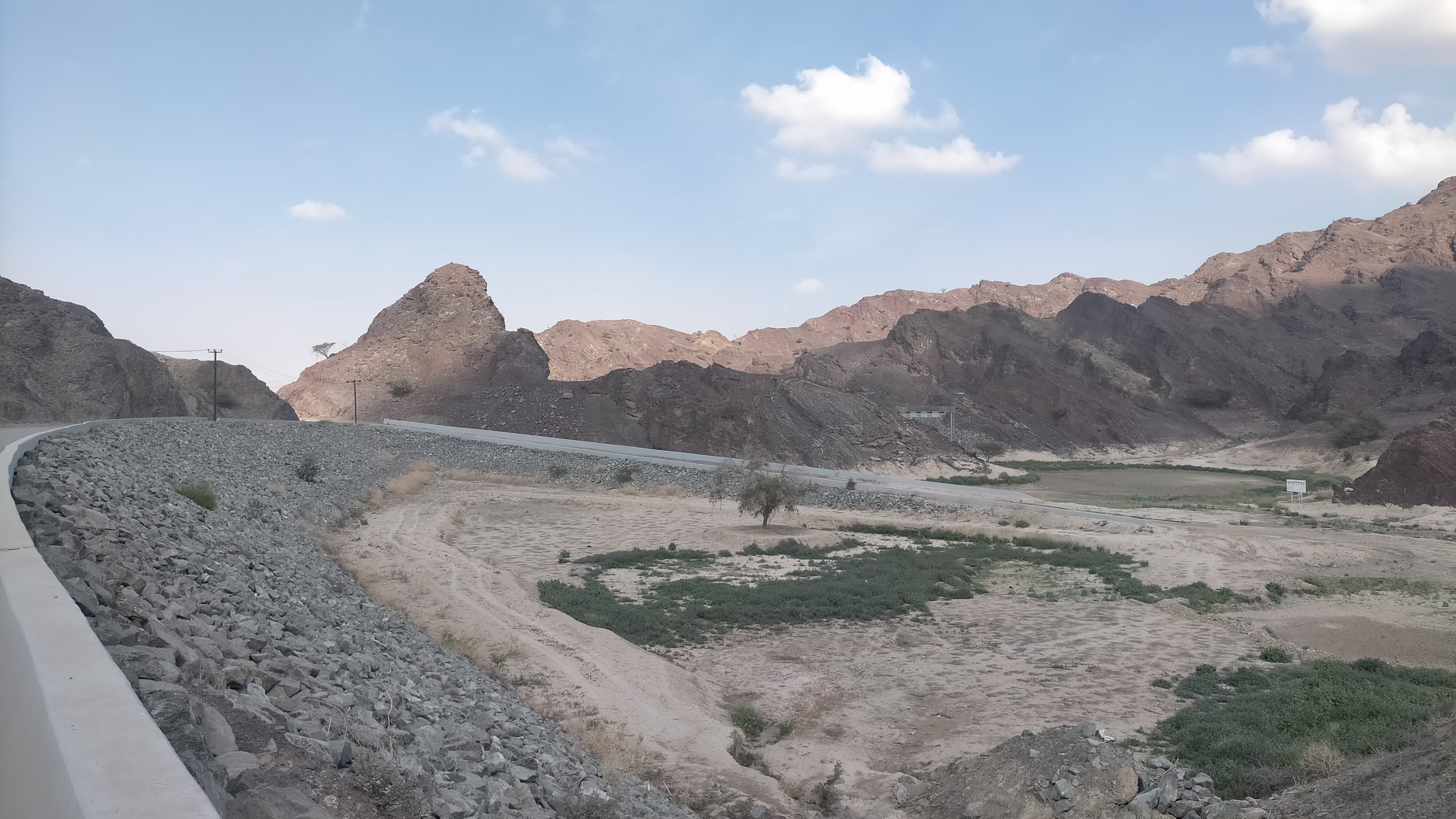
Wadi Kub Dam (2) and road reinforcement, which also acts as a dam and expands the surface of the reservoir

In that same area, just 300 m (980 ft) to the south, is the old village of Kub / Qub, located at the mouth of the Wadi Lil, left tributary of the Wadi Kub.

Following the main course of the Wadi Kub, occupied for the most part by a wide dirt track called Al Mesrah Road, and already in the Emirate of Ras Al Khaimah, is 800 m (2,600 ft) later, the cultivation area of Karas, located next to the mouth of another important tributary to the left of the Kub, the Wadi Suftah / Wādī Şafat.

At the end of its middle course, the Wadi Kub turns towards the northwest, and its most important dam with greatest capacity, the Wadi Kub Dam (2), was built in its channel, also in 2013, whose reservoir has been expanded with road reinforcement and covers an area of 25,000 m^{2} (2.5 ha).

In its lower course, with very little slope, the wadi runs the last kilometers to its mouth, bordering to the south and west a large urbanization, built on the alluvial plain formed by the Wadi Kub, the Wadi Al Himriyyah, the Wadi Mu'taridah / Wadi Mutarid and others, which for greater confusion also adopted the name of Kub (like the homonymous village in the Emirate of Fujairah).

Its course is almost exhausted, on the outskirts of the aforementioned urbanization, and before its mouth at the foot of Jabal Satif there is a fourth dam, the Wadi Kub Dam (4), which means that practically the last section of the wadi remains constantly dry.

== Toponymy ==
Alternative names: Wādī Qub, Wādī Kūb, Wadi Kub, Wadi Kubb, Wadi Kuub, Wadi Kob, Wadi Qub.

The name of this wadi appears in the documents and maps prepared between 1950 and 1960 by the British Arabist, cartographer, military officer and diplomat Julian F. Walker, and in many other documents related to the work carried out to establish borders between the so-called Trucial States, later completed by the United Kingdom Ministry of Defense, on 1:100,000 scale maps published in 1971.

In the Atlas National of the United Arab Emirates is identified with the spelling Wādī Kūb.

== Population ==
There is documentary evidence of the existence of old agricultural villages, in the entire area near the Wadi Kub and its tributaries, which was populated, mainly, by the Mazari / Mazārī‘ tribe, which was part of the Bani Yas tribal federation.

== See also ==
- List of wadis of the United Arab Emirates
- List of mountains in the United Arab Emirates
- List of wadis of Oman
- List of mountains in Oman
