= Wadi Al Himriyyah =

Wadi Al Himriyyah Wādī Al Himriyyah
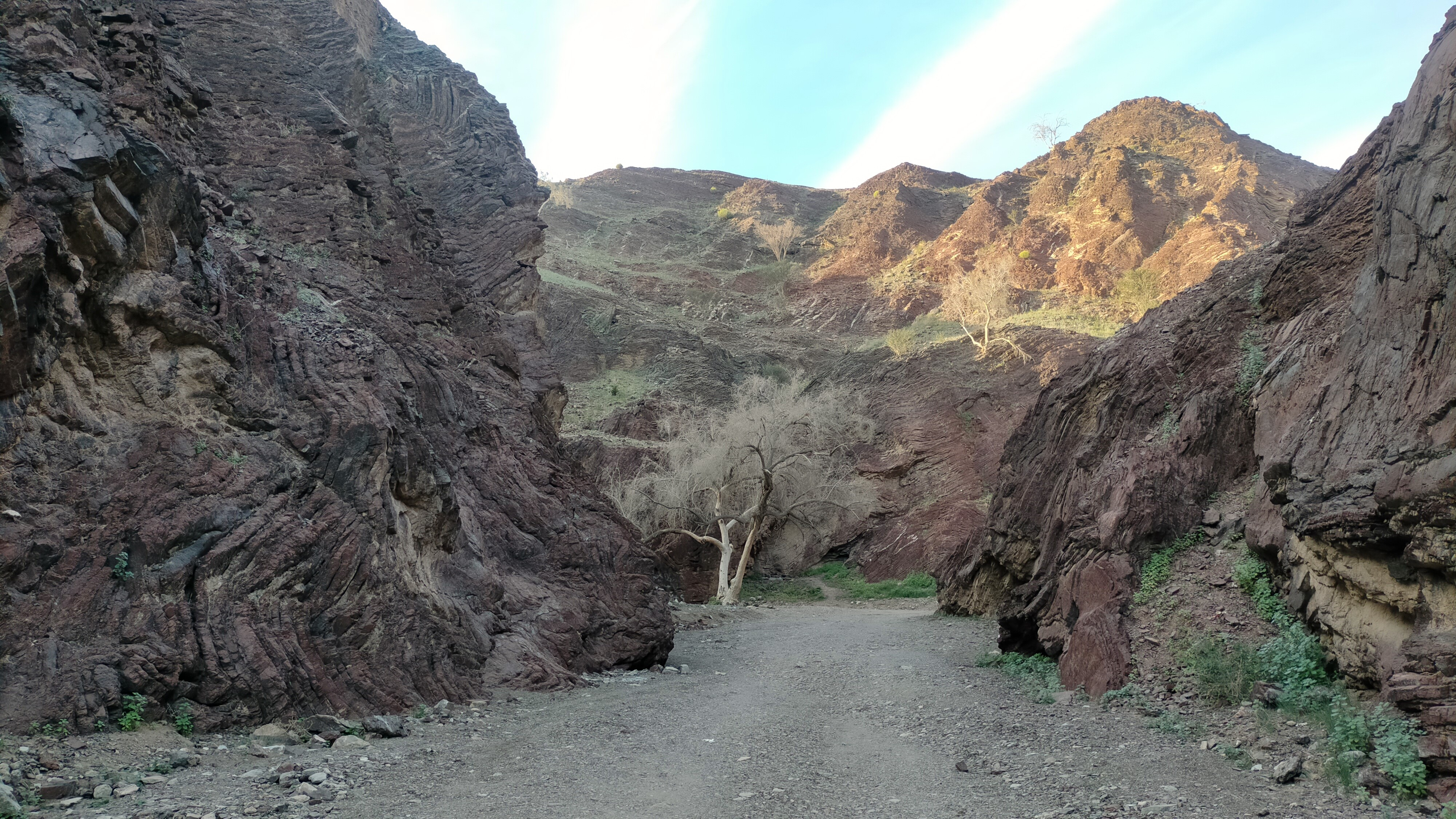
- Wadi Al Himriyyah. Beautiful stratified rock formations

- Location within United Arab Emirates Location within Persian Gulf Location within West and Central Asia
- Native name: وادي الحمرية (Arabic)

Location
- Country: United Arab Emirates
- Emirate: Ras Al Khaimah
- Emirate: Fujairah

Physical characteristics
- Source: Southwest slope of Jabal Huq (629 m (2,064 ft)), in the Emirate of Fujairah, UAE.
  - elevation: 527 m (1,729 ft)
- Mouth: In the Wadi Mu'taridah / Wadi Mutarid, shortly before the town of Saram, at the foot of Jabal Satif (367 m (1,204 ft)), in the Emirate of Fujairah.
  - coordinates: 25°29′46.0″N 56°05′52.0″E
  - elevation: 226 m (741 ft)
- Length: 4.5 km (2.8 mi)
- Basin size: 4.12 km^{2} (1.59 mi^{2})

Basin features
- River system: Wadi Mu'taridah / Wadi Mutarid
- Tributaries
  - left: Wadi Al Himriyyah (Southeast Branch) and Wadi Al Himriyyah (South Branch)

Wadi Al Himriyyah (Arabic: وادي الحمرية, romanized: Wādī Al Himriyyah) is a valley or dry river, with ephemeral or intermittent flow, flowing almost exclusively during the rainy season, located northeast of the United Arab Emirates, in the emirates of Fujairah and Ras Al Khaimah.

It belongs to the interior drainage basin of Wadi Mu'taridah / Wadi Mutarid / Wadi Al Mithaddim (65 km^{2} (25 mi^{2})), of which it is a tributary on the left, and extends through a small catchment subbasin of only 4.12 km^{2} (1.59 mi^{2}), which limits to the north and northwest with that of Wadi Mu'taridah / Wadi Mutarid / Wadi Al Mithaddim; and to the south and west with that of Wadi Kub.

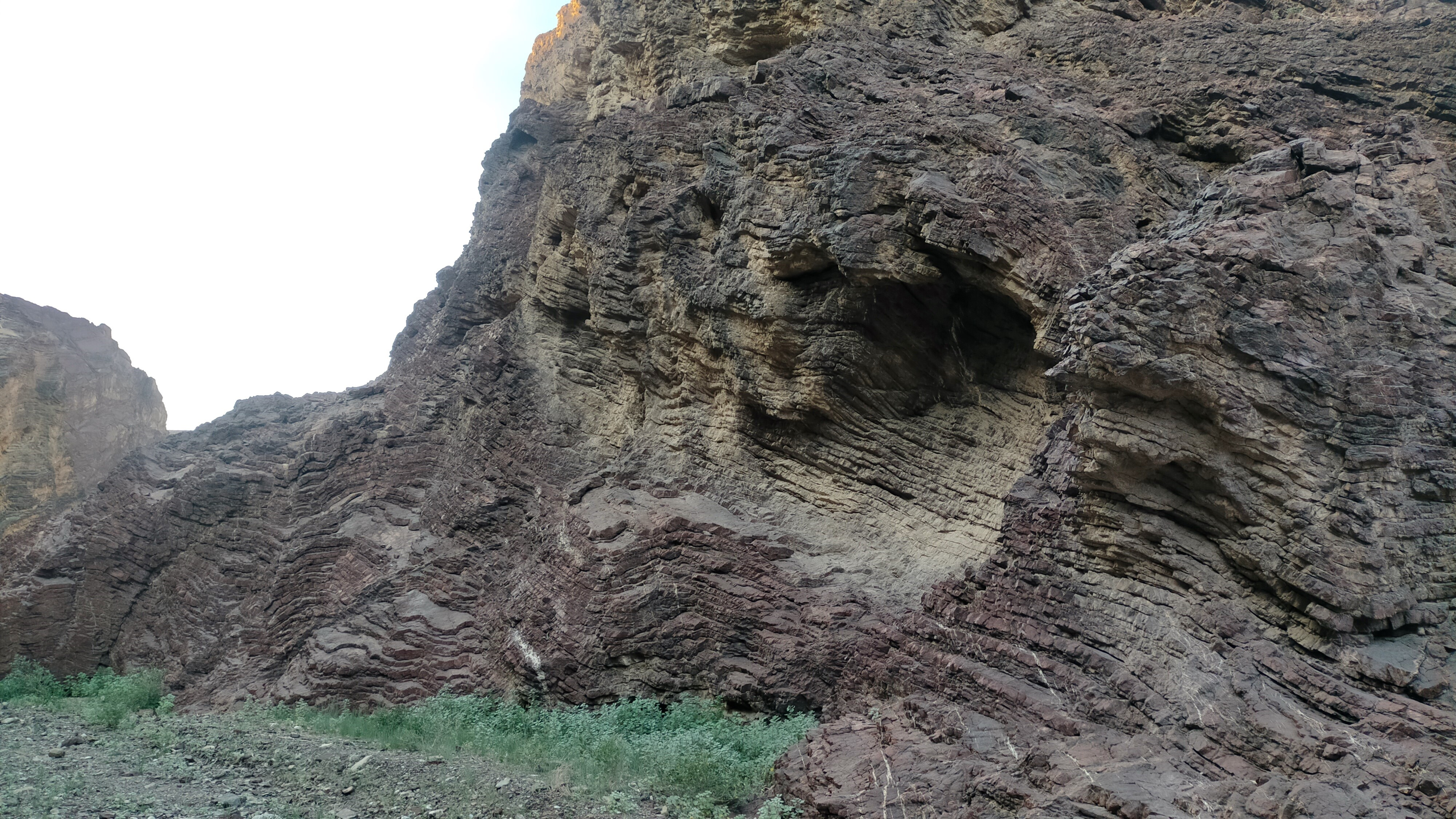
Wadi Al Himriyyah. Beautiful stratified rock formations

The source of the main channel of the Wadi Al Himriyyah is located approximately 565 m (1,854 ft) southwest of the summit of Jabal Huq 629 m (2,064 ft), in the Emirate of Fujairah, highest point in the entire drainage basin, which is characterized by a mountainous relief, with small hills that very rarely exceed 500 m (1,600 ft) of altitude.

== Course ==
The Wadi Al Himriyyah initially flows from east to southwest, and in its middle course it turns towards the northwest, receiving in its trajectory the contribution of two tributary arms (southeast arm and south arm) and multiple smaller ravines.

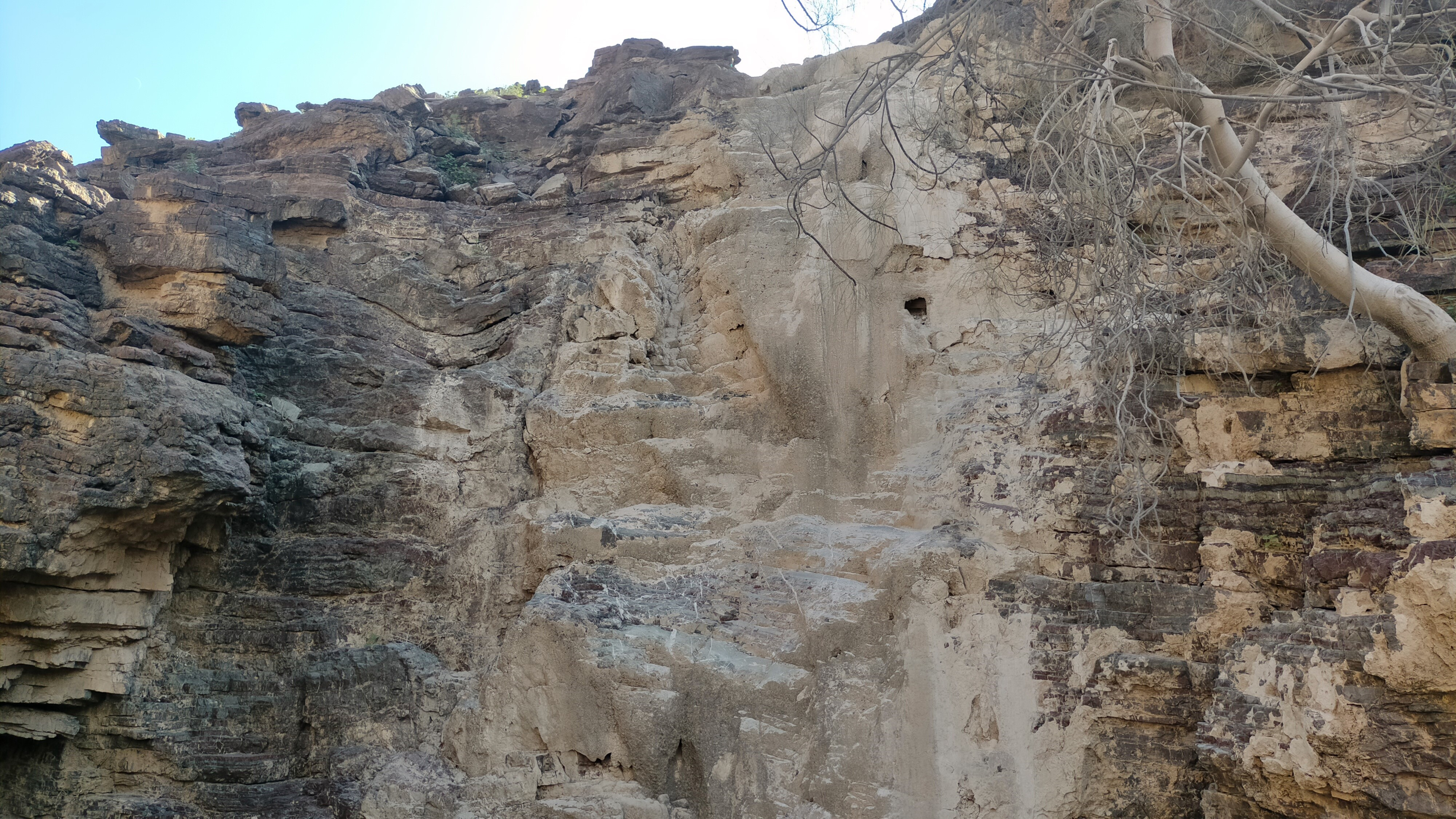
Wadi Al Himriyyah Dry Falls - One of the dry waterfalls in the southeast arm of the Wadi Al Himriyyah

Approximately 2.3 km (1.4 mi) since its source, already in the territory of the Emirate of Ras Al Khaimah, the Wadi Al Himriyyah receives from the left the waters of its short-east arm, of short length, which is distinguished by the presence of several small dry waterfalls, the Wadi Al Himriyyah Dry Falls, between 10 and 20 m (33 and 66 ft) high.

Almost in km 3, right in the place where the wadi turns towards the northwest, also receives from the left the contribution of its southern arm, which is longer than the previous one, and which in turn is formed by the confluence of several ravines that descend from the hills of between 450 and 470 m (1,480 and 1,540 ft) of elevation, which delimit the southeast of the catchment subbasin.

One of these small ravines forms, shortly before its mouth in the southern arm, a narrow throat, at the exit of which there is a large rock monolith, known as Al Himriyyah Rock, which due to its original shape and dimensions has become one of the most representative images of this wadi.

The middle and lower course of the Wadi Al Himriyyah is characterized by its very low gradient and the existence of a small gorge, with high walls of stratified rocks, with striking folds of diverse colors, in which ochre, reddish and green tones predominate.

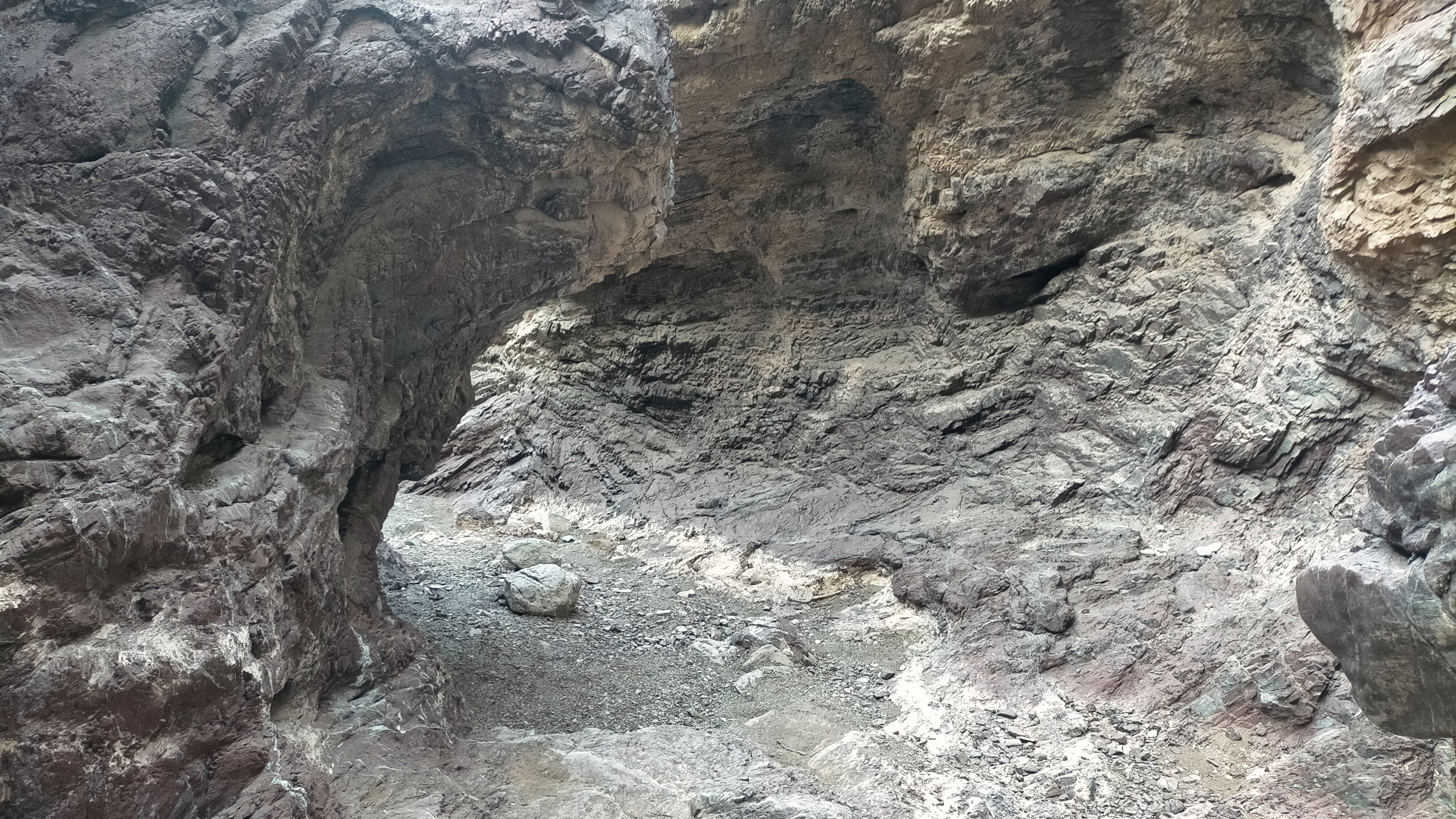
Wadi Al Himriyyah. Channel of one of the ravines of the south arm

This low gradient in the middle and lower course of the wadi and the lack of erosion caused by large floods, means that a good part of the channel has in fact become a gravel and dirt track, through which currently vehicles can circulate freely, with the inconveniences that this entails for the harmony and conservation of the natural environment, although some visitors positively value the advantage of being able to reach some of the places of greatest tourist interest by car.

Many of these casual visitors arrive and leave without truly knowing its name, mistakenly convinced that they have visited Wadi Kub, actually located four kilometers to the south and west .

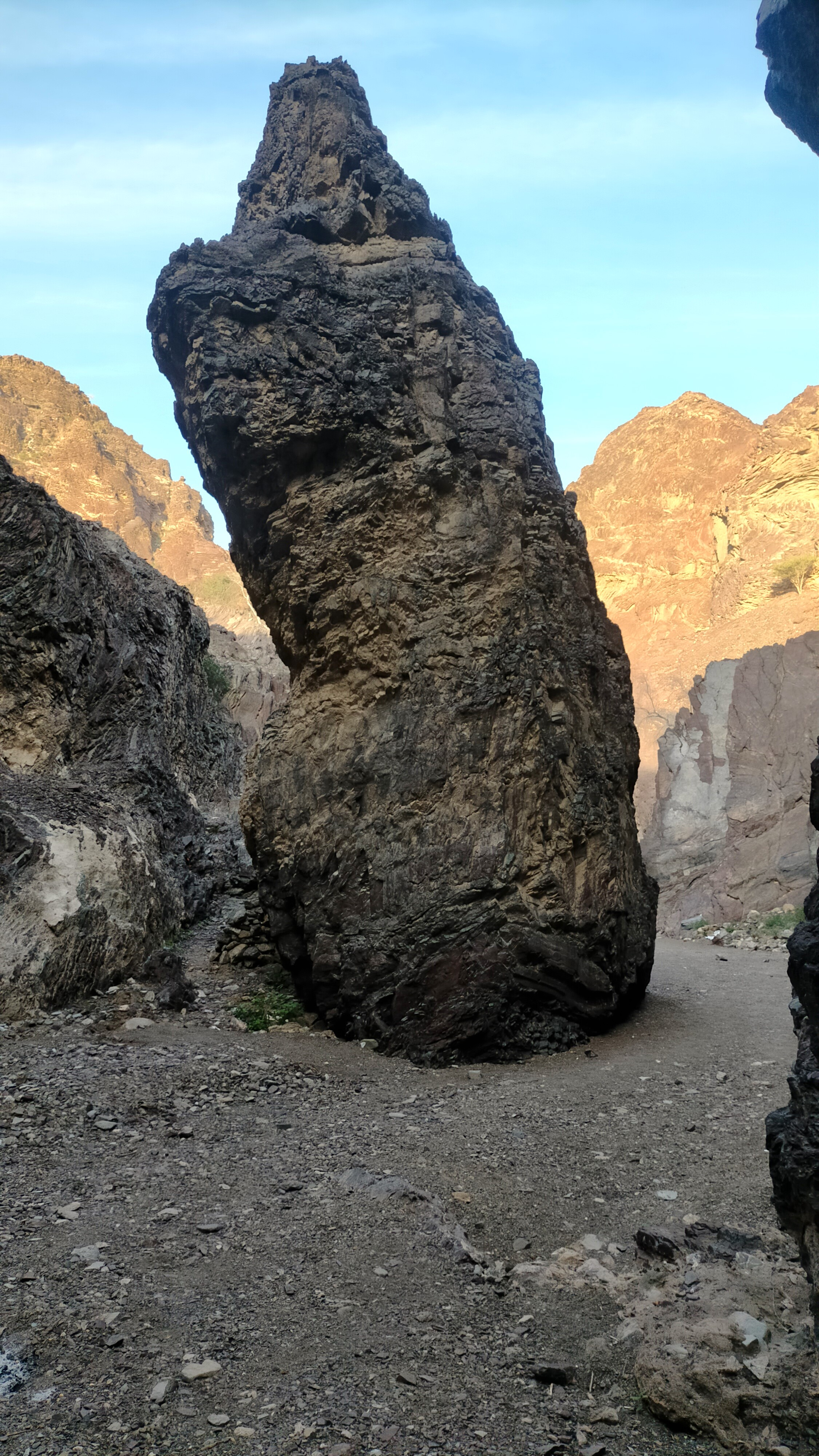
Al Himriyyah Rock. Large monolith at the exit of the narrow gorge that forms the Wadi Al Himriyyah at that point

== Toponymy ==
Alternative names: Wādī Al Himriyyah, Wadi Al Hamriyah.

The names of this wadi and its tributaries are not mentioned in the documentation and maps prepared between 1950 and 1960 by the British Arabist, cartographer, military officer and diplomat Julian F. Walker, during the work carried out to establish borders between the then called Trucial States, later completed by the United Kingdom Ministry of Defence, on 1:100,000 scale maps published in 1972, although in The latter does include the traces of the main course of the wadi and its different arms and tributaries.

In The National Atlas of the United Arab Emirates it is identified with the spelling Wādī Al Himriyyah.

== Population ==
Although there is no evidence of the existence of towns or old villages in the course of this wadi, the entire area near Wadi Al Himriyyah, Wadi Kub and other nearby wadis, and their respective tributaries, was populated by the Mazari / Mazārī' tribe, which was part of the tribal federation Bani Yas (tribal confederation).

== See also ==
- List of wadis of the United Arab Emirates
- List of mountains in the United Arab Emirates
- List of wadis of Oman
- List of mountains in Oman
