= Ghayl =

- Location within United Arab Emirates
- Coordinates: 25°24′0″N 56°4′0″E
- Country: United Arab Emirates
- Emirate: Ras Al Khaimah
- Elevation: 269 m (883 ft)

Population (2023)
  - Total: 10,337

Ghayl is a town in Ras Al Khaimah, United Arab Emirates. Situated in the foothills of the Hajar Mountains. It lies at the mouth of the Wadi Fara and was traditionally home to members of the Mazari tribe.
