= Mawrid =

- Location within United Arab Emirates
- Coordinates: 25°25′57″N 56°6′54″E
- Country: United Arab Emirates
- Emirate: Ras al-Khaimah
- Elevation: 458 m (1,503 ft)

Mawrid (Arabic: مورد) is a settlement in Ras Al Khaimah, United Arab Emirates (UAE). It is located in the Wadi Asimah.
