= Adhen, Ras Al Khaimah =

Town in the United Arab Emirates

Adhen
- Location within United Arab Emirates
- Coordinates: 25°27′31″N 56°0′56″E
- Country: United Arab Emirates
- Emirate: Ras Al Khaimah
- Elevation: 143 m (469 ft)

Population (2023)
  - Total: 5,196
- Time zone: +04:00

Adhen (Arabic: اذن) is a town in the Emirate of Ras Al Khaimah of the United Arab Emirates. It was formerly the location of the Desert Regiment and Mortar Troop of the Trucial Oman Scouts. Traditionally, Adhen was home to members of the Mazari tribe. In an area normally noted for its high levels of rainfall and fertility in the Winter and Spring, Adhen enjoyed record levels of rainfall in 2020 – according to local residents, the heaviest in 30 years.
