= Wadi Asimah =

- Location within United Arab Emirates
- Coordinates: 25°25′17″N 56°5′48″E
- Country: United Arab Emirates
- Emirate: Ras Al Khaimah
- Elevation: 401 m (1,316 ft)

Wadi Asimah is a seasonal watercourse in the Hajar Mountains of Ras Al Khaimah in the United Arab Emirates. It runs broadly westward from the village of Asimah to join the Wadi Fara, its confluence forming the locus between Wadi Fara and Wadi Sidr.

A popular location for day trippers and offroading, Wadi Asimah is notable for its lush greenery and agriculture. It is the site of the 'Sultan's Gardens', an area of abundant oleander, grasses, palm groves and pools that often (and unusually) harbours water year-round, as well as providing a nesting ground for heron. In winter, the mountainous wadi will receive heavy rainfall, leading to flash floods, and has even seen hail on occasion.

The villages of Asimah and Mawrid and the course of the Wadi Asimah were traditionally settled by members of the Mazari tribe.

== Geology and archaeology ==
Wadi Asimah is both a geologically and archaeologically rich area, with thick fluvial deposits and archaeological sites. Wadi Asimah has lent its name to the 'Asimah Window', an area of isoclinally folded metacherts formed by metamorphic events.

The archaeology of the area of Wadi Asimah yields signs of human habitation from the Neolithic to the present. Prehistoric incised arrowheads have been found in the area, which is also the site of an Umm Al Nar settlement, with finds including a bronze goblet, socketed spear-heads and dagger blades. A number of tombs from the late Umm Al Nar period were located at the edges of the wadi. Iron Age finds have also been made in the wadi.

== Gallery ==
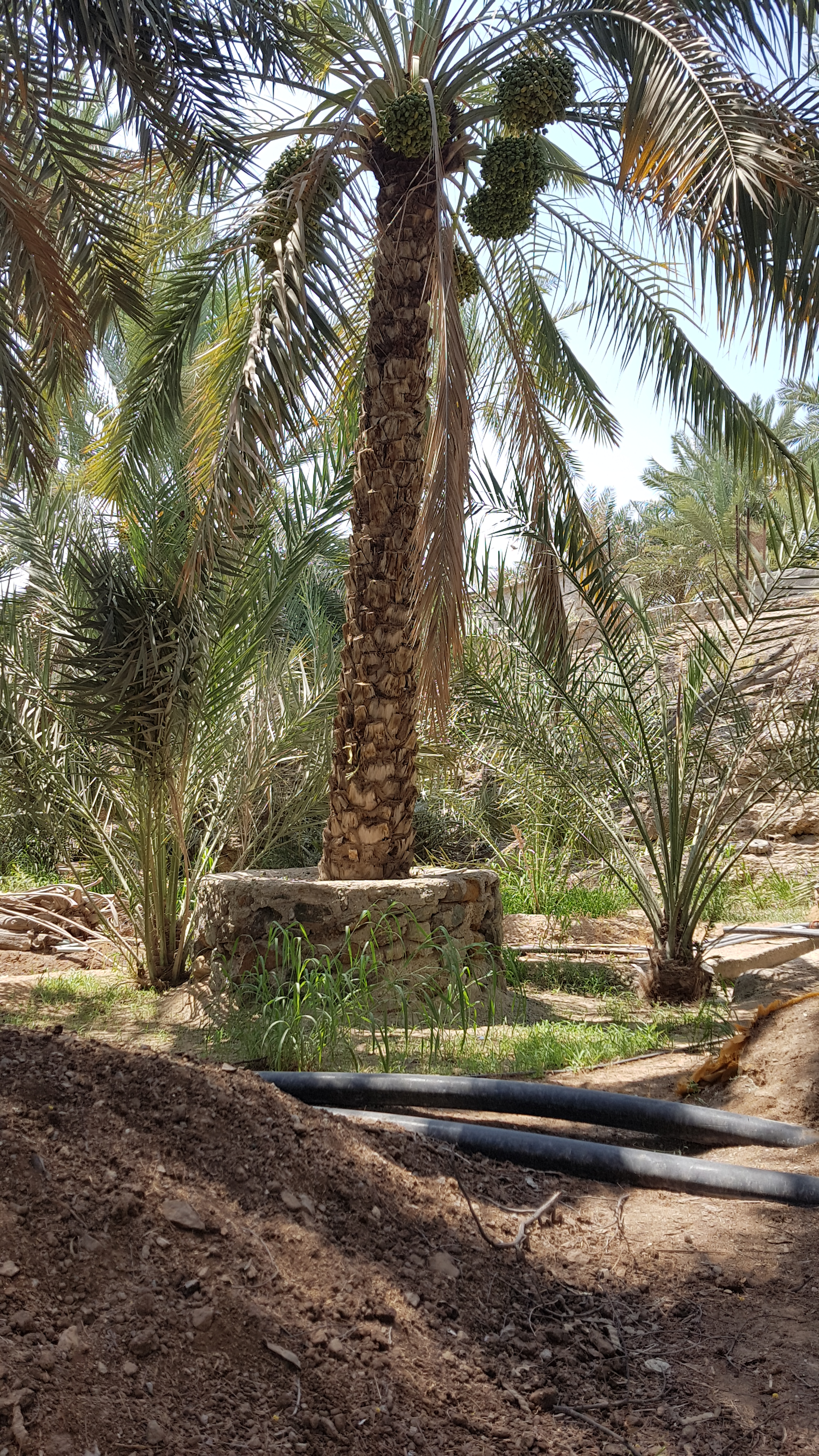
Falaj Ghayli, a surface irrigation waterway in a palm grove on the edges of the Wadi Asimah

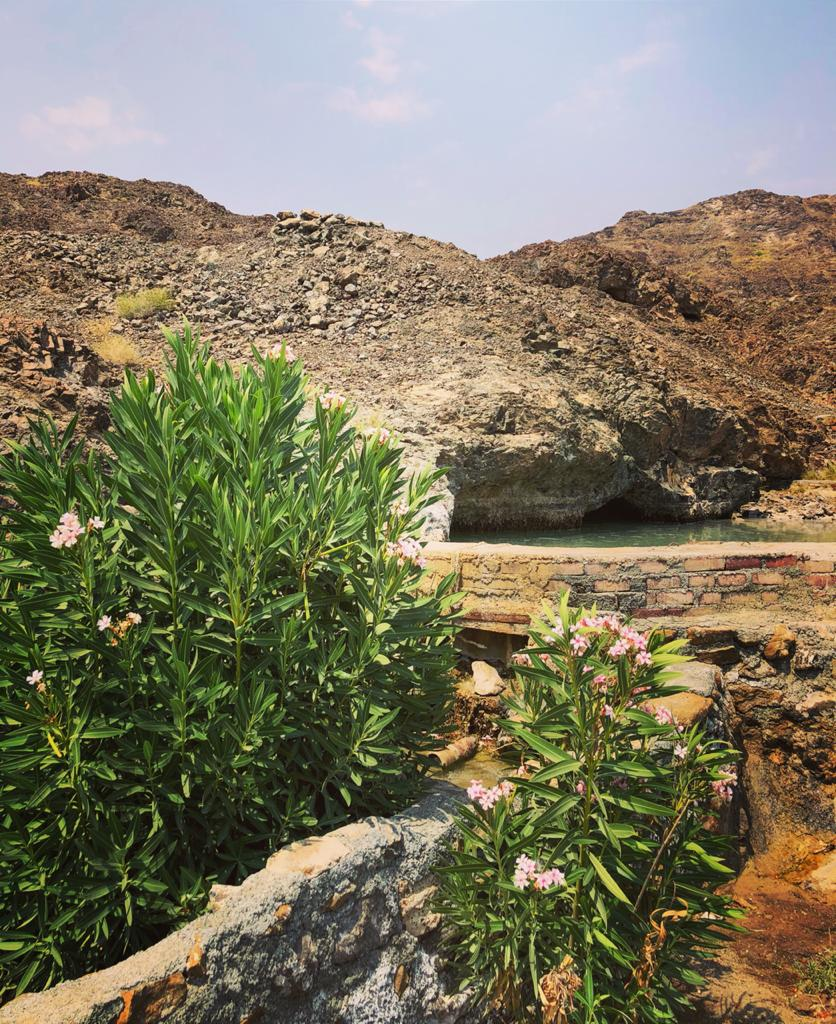
Oleander in the Wadi Asimah

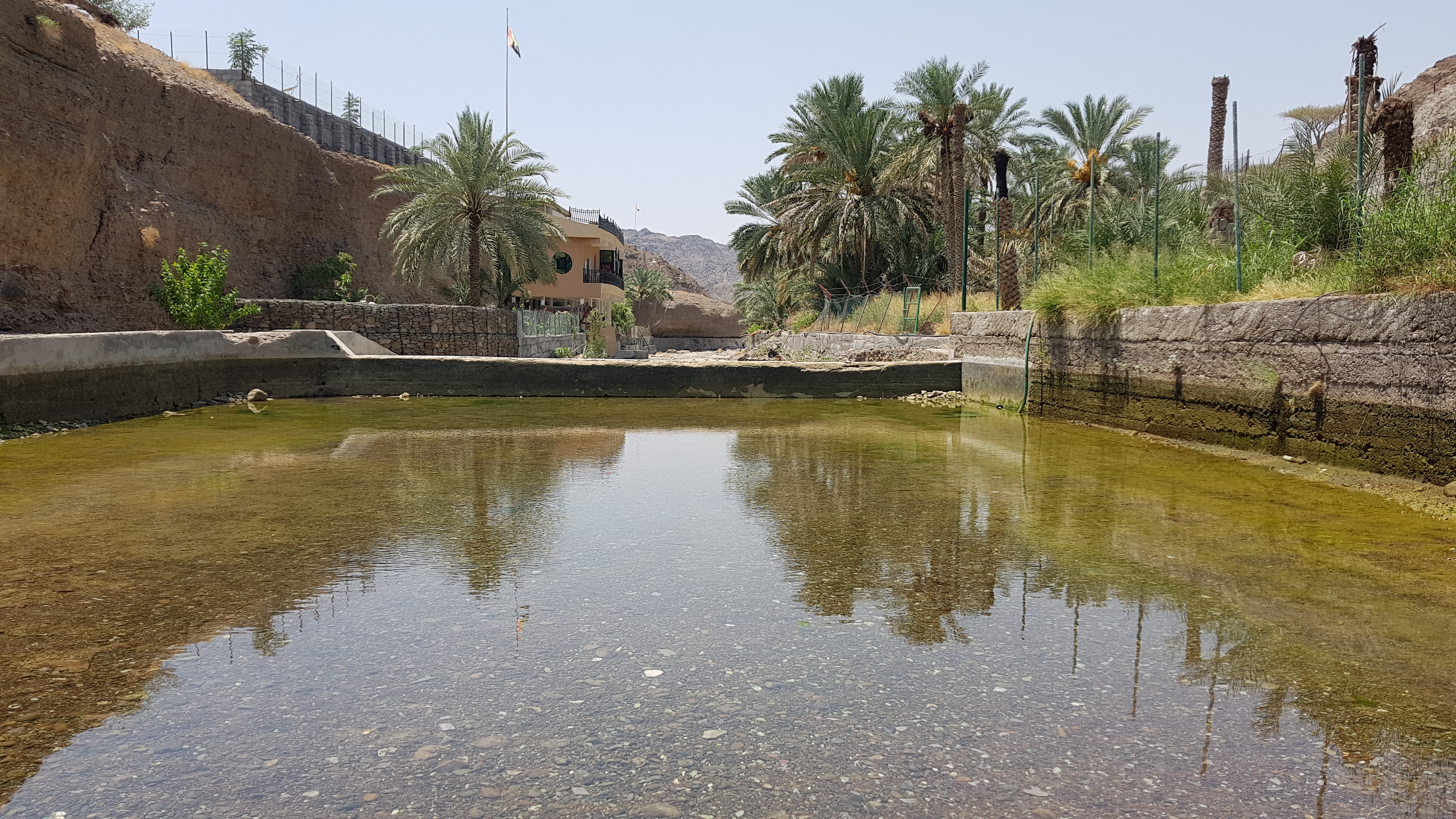
The 'Sultan's Gardens' in the Wadi Asimah is an area of year-round water, unusual in the wadis of the Hajar Mountains

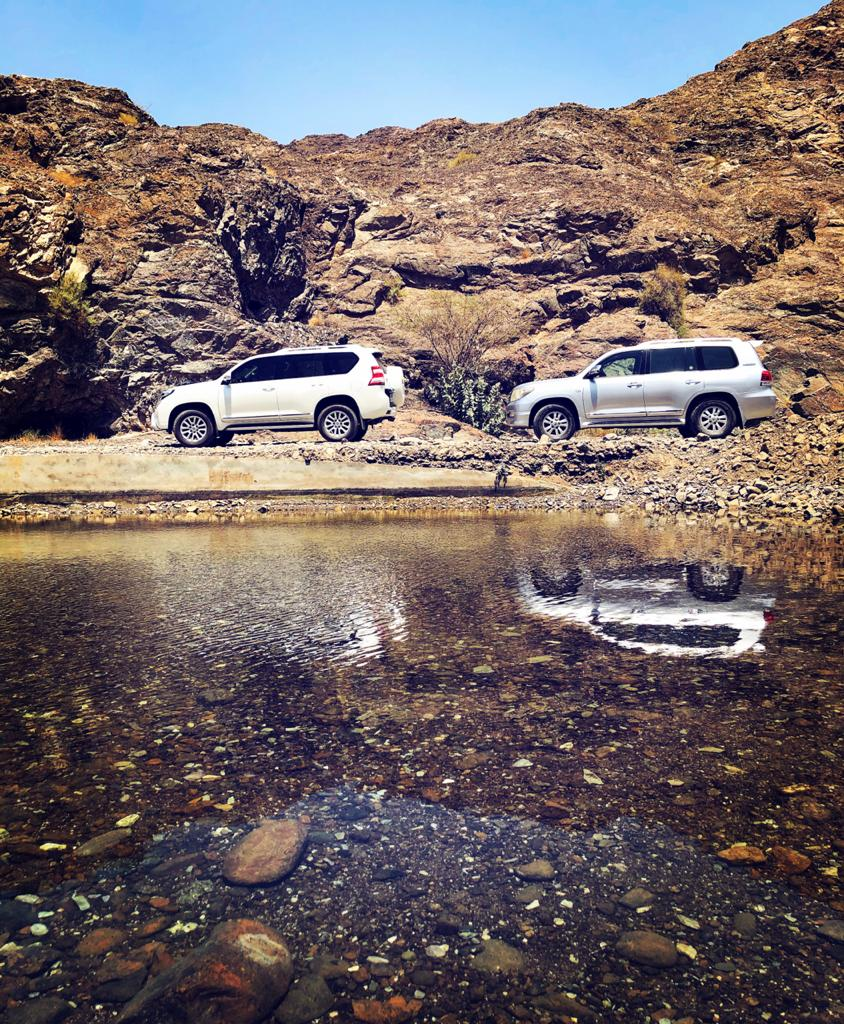
Day trippers pass abundant water in the Wadi Asimah in the summer months

== See also ==
- List of wadis of the United Arab Emirates
