= Asimah =

- Location within United Arab Emirates
- Coordinates: 25°24′9″N 56°8′35″E
- Country: United Arab Emirates
- Emirate: Ras Al Khaimah
- Elevation: 602 m (1,975 ft)

Asimah is a settlement in Ras Al Khaimah, in the United Arab Emirates (UAE), located on the banks of the Wadi Asimah.
