= Mazari (Arab tribe) =

Bedouin tribe of the United Arab Emirates and Oman

- Arab tribe
- Ethnicity: Arab
- Location: United Arab Emirates; Sultanate of Oman
- Descended from: Banu Tamim
- Branches: Qawaid
- Language: Arabic
- Religion: Islam
- Surnames: Mazrui

The Mazari (singular Mazrouei or Mazrui) is an Arab tribe of the United Arab Emirates, also found in the Sultanate of Oman and Kenya. The Mazari settled throughout the Trucial States but principally in Abu Dhabi. They are considered a subsection of the Bani Yas and formed the majority of the Bedouin component of that federation of tribes.

In the nineteenth century, they contributed significant numbers of tribesmen to support Zayed bin Khalifa in conflicts against Wahhabi incursions. While some members left Abu Dhabi during the 1950s, many remained and continued to play an important role in securing the interior of the region, frequently serving as guards for oil exploration companies.

== Origins ==
The Mazari are regarded as the second most influential and likely the most populous section of the Bani Yas confederation. Although they were originally considered to belong to a separate Ghafiri faction and to follow the Hanbali school of Islamic jurisprudence, the Mazari of Abu Dhabi are generally understood to adhere to the Maliki school.

According to the Amir of the Mazari at Adhen and Ghayl, the Mazari are traditionally said to originate from the Bani Tamim tribe and to have settled in the region at an unspecified period, having already embraced Islam prior to their arrival. Different Mazari communities hold varying views regarding their origins. Some groups identify with the Mazari section of the Bani Yas tribe of Abu Dhabi, a connection supported by accounts of migration from the Liwa region to Ghayl during the economic hardships of the 1940s. Other Mazari communities, particularly those in Wadi Sfuni and Wadi Sfai, regard themselves as among the original inhabitants of their respective areas.

== Liwa Oasis ==
The Liwa Oasis was the homeplace of many of the Mazari, the principal Bedouin section of the Bani Yas confederation, where the U.K. Memorial continued to list them as the principal property owners among the six Bani Yas tribes in the area, recording 142 families in 1951 and 151 families in 1954 and consisting of some 315 houses at the turn of the 20th century according to J. G. Lorimer. They were closely associated with the Marar tribe at Liwa. At that time there were also some 300 Mazari at Al Khan in Sharjah and 500 in the areas of Adhen and Asimah. Those of the Mazari who settled in Dubai came to consider themselves as apart from the Bani Yas as a result of political disputes with former rulers of Abu Dhabi. The area around Wadi Helou in the Hajar Mountains of Sharjah is also an area of Mazari settlement. They were herdsmen and records show they settled into an agrarian existence in the oasis following the decline in the value of camels and the use of traditional camel trains which took place in the Trucial States during the early 20th century. Despite this settlement pattern, the Mazari continued to practice seasonal pastoralism, accompanying their camel herds during the winter months to grazing areas in Dhafrah or Khatam. They were also involved in the seasonal pearl fisheries, owning boats that were launched from Bandar Rudaim and nearby coastal inlets closest to their Liwa settlements.

Over time, the Mazari acquired additional date gardens in Liwa villages where they had not previously been recorded. This development suggests a gradual shift toward a more sedentary lifestyle during the first half of the twentieth century, likely influenced by the declining economic importance of camels as the primary means of desert transport. Many Mazari sold substantial portions of their herds to raise cash for purchasing date gardens, thereby increasing their access to their staple food, dates. During the early decades of the century, this transition coincided with similar movements among other Bani Yas groups who were able to acquire property in the Buraimi villages. Like their Bedouin counterparts the Manasir, many Mazari found temporary employment in the burgeoning oil industries of neighboring countries as modernisation forced changes in the lifestyle of the Bedouin of the area. Maintaining date gardens, which could be managed by female or elderly family members, was often considered more practical as a form of economic security than retaining large camel herds vulnerable to raiding. The Mazari also formed the second largest Bedouin contingent among the Ruler's retainers, being said to be loyal and "in their bedu fashion, disciplined."

== Conflict and schism ==
When Sheikh Saeed bin Tahnun Al Nahyan repelled the Wahhabis from the Buraimi Oasis in 1848, it was the Mazari, together with the Manasir, who waited South of Abu Dhabi to fall on the relieving force sent from Nejd under Saad bin Mutlaq. The two tribes were also linked in events further north, where they were involved in a conflict with the wali of Al Khan, Muhamad bin Ubaid in 1920. Some 75 pearling boats sailed from Al Khan each season, owned by settled Mazari and Manasir families. However, the village was frequently plundered by Bedouin Mazari and Al Bu Shamis, the Ruler of Sharjah, Sheikh Sultan bin Saqr Al Qasimi, and the wali being accused of doing little to protect the village, whilst also insisting on a tribute of 50 bags of rice at the commencement of each pearling season. When the wali died in 1931, the village appointed its own headman – a move which was punished by Sultan bin Saqr, who replaced the murdered headman with his brother Muhammad.

An outbreak of hostilities between the Bedouin tribes of Dhafra (the area between Abu Dhabi and the Rub Al Kali) in the early 20th century rumbled on until the early 1920s, with the Mazari split between a group who sought Saudi protection and a group who migrated to Abu Dhabi and its islands. After Sheikh Hamdan bin Zayed Al Nahyan arranged a truce, the Mazari returned to Dhafra but fighting between the tribes continued: a conflict used by Abdelaziz Ibn Saud of Saudi Arabia to increase his influence over the tribes and exact the tax zakat from them. These shifting allegiances and schisms were to form part of the Saudi claims which led to the Buraimi Dispute.

== Notable Mazari ==
=== Political and Economic Influencers in Abu Dhabi ===
Until 1955, Ahmad bin Fadhil Al-Mazrui served as the wali of Liwa and the wider oil-producing western region under Shakhbut bin Sultan. From the 1960s through the 1990s, members of the Mazari, alongside the Suwdan, held numerous senior positions within the Abu Dhabi emirate and, in some cases, at the federal level. Among the most prominent figures was Yousef bin Omar Al-Mazrui, who served as the UAE’s federal minister of petroleum until 1994, after which he joined the Supreme Petroleum Council. Ghaim bin Faris Al-Mazrui served as secretary-general of the Abu Dhabi Investment Authority and held a director-level position in the ruler’s private department. Other notable figures during this period included Suhail bin Faris Al-Mazrui, director general of the Abu Dhabi National Oil Company and chairman of the Abu Dhabi Marine Areas Company; Rashid bin Muhammad Al-Mazrui and Ahmad bin Khalaf Al-Mazrui, both members of the Federal National Council; and Khalid bin Abdullah Al-Aynayn of the Al-Bu Aynayn branch of the Mazari, who served as an air force adviser to the UAE Armed Forces.

The Mazari continue to hold prominent positions in Abu Dhabi’s political and economic life. The ruler’s wife is a member of the family, and several individuals currently occupy senior roles, including Yousef bin Omar Al-Mazrui, chairman of ADNOC; Ahmad bin Mubarak Al-Mazrui, a member of the Abu Dhabi Executive Council and chairman of the Abu Dhabi Health Authority; Khalifa bin Muhammad Al-Mazrui, chairman of the Abu Dhabi Airports Company; Muhammad bin Khalaf Al-Mazrui, director general of the Abu Dhabi Authority for Culture and Heritage; and Muhammad bin Hamad Al-Mazrui, director general of the Western Region Development Council. Another influential figure is Muhammad bin Saif Al-Mazrui, who serves on the boards of the Mubadala Development Company and the Tourism Development & Investment Company.

=== Other notable Mazari ===
- Shamma bint Suhail Faris Al Mazrui
- Suhail Al Mazroui
- Shamsa bint Suhail Al Mazrouei
- Khalil Khamis Al Mazrouei
- Fatima Al Mazrouei
- Sulaiman Al Mazrui
