= Wadi Sifuni =

Wadi in UAE

Wadi Sifuni Wādī Iṣfani
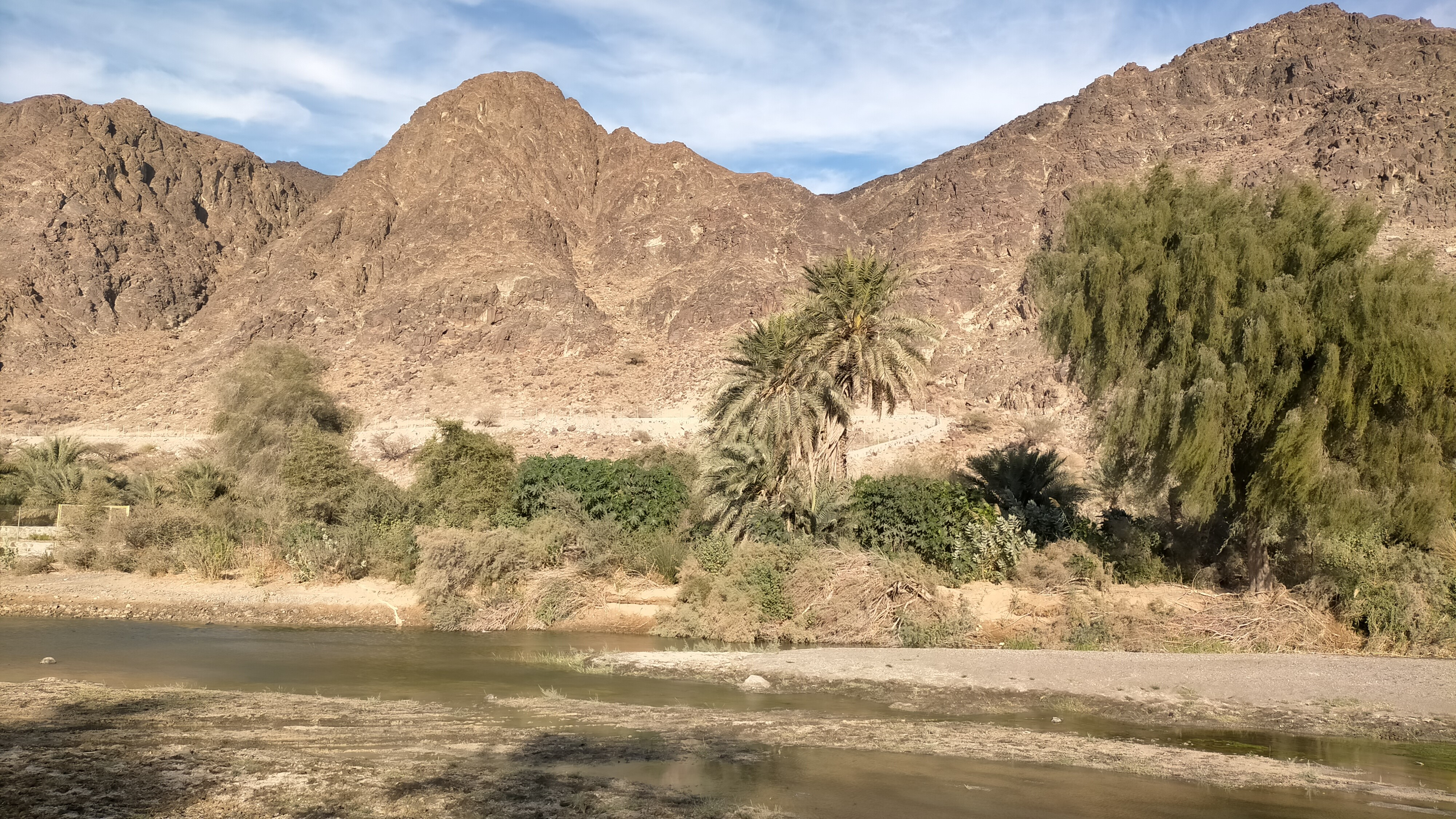

- Location within United Arab Emirates Location within Persian Gulf Location within West and Central Asia
- Native name: وادي إصفني (Arabic)

Location
- Country: United Arab Emirates
- Emirate: Ras Al Khaimah

Physical characteristics
- Source: On the eastern edge of the watershed, 700 meters south of Jabal Bulaydah.
  - elevation: 734 m (2,408 ft), approximately (Wadi Baqarah).
- Mouth: Confluence with the Wadi Ashwani / Wādī Al ‘Ishwānī, near the village of Kadrah (Ras Al Khaimah)
  - coordinates: 25°11′41.41″N 56°00′25.7400″E
  - elevation: 192 m (630 ft)
- Length: 25 km (16 mi)
- Basin size: 216 km^{2} (83 mi^{2}).

Basin features
- Progression: Wadi. Intermittent flow
- River system: Wadi Sifuni & Wadi Ashwani
- Tributaries
  - left: Wadi Mamduh, Wadi Esfai.
  - right: Wadi Baqarah (upper segment of the main wadi).

Wadi Sifuni (Arabic: وادي إصفني, romanized: Wādī Iṣfani) is a valley or dry river, with an ephemeral or intermittent flow, occurring almost exclusively during the rainy season, located in the east of the United Arab Emirates, in the emirate of Ras al Khaimah.

Together with the Wadi Ashwani /Wādī Al ‘Ishwānī, their combined drainage basin covers 216 km^{2} (83 mi^{2}), bordered to the north by that of the Wadi Siji, to the south by the Wadi Shawka, and to the south and east by the drainage divide of the mountain range separating the Persian Gulf and Gulf of Oman basins, as well as the catchment area of the Wadi Farfar.

The entire Sifuni & Ashwani drainage basin, whose highest peak is Jabal Al Ghunah (1,020 m (3,350 ft)), contains approximately 270 independent streams, most of them unnamed, all classified into five grades or levels according to the Horton-Strahler numbering. In addition to Wadi Baqarah, which is considered an upper segment of the main wadi, Wadi Mamduh and Wadi Esfai are notable for their length and flow.

== Course ==
The total approximate length of Wadi Sifuni is 25 km (16 mi) (including the upper segment, also known as Wadi Baqarah).

It flows from east to west, and its main source is located on the southern slope of Jabal Bulaydah (830 m (2,720 ft)), at an approximate altitude of 734 m (2,408 ft).

In its middle course, it passes through the village of Sifuni, also known as Esfini or Sha'biyyāt Işfany, and after receiving the Wadi Esfai flow on its left, it enters an area occupied by large gabbro quarries, which have affected the course of the wadi and caused considerable environmental impact in its surroundings.

In the area of its confluence with the Wadi Ashwani, at the beginning of the great alluvial plain of the Wadi Kadrah, an important well was built, known historically as Tawi Kadrah, origin of the present-day village of Kadrah.

== Dams and Reservoirs ==
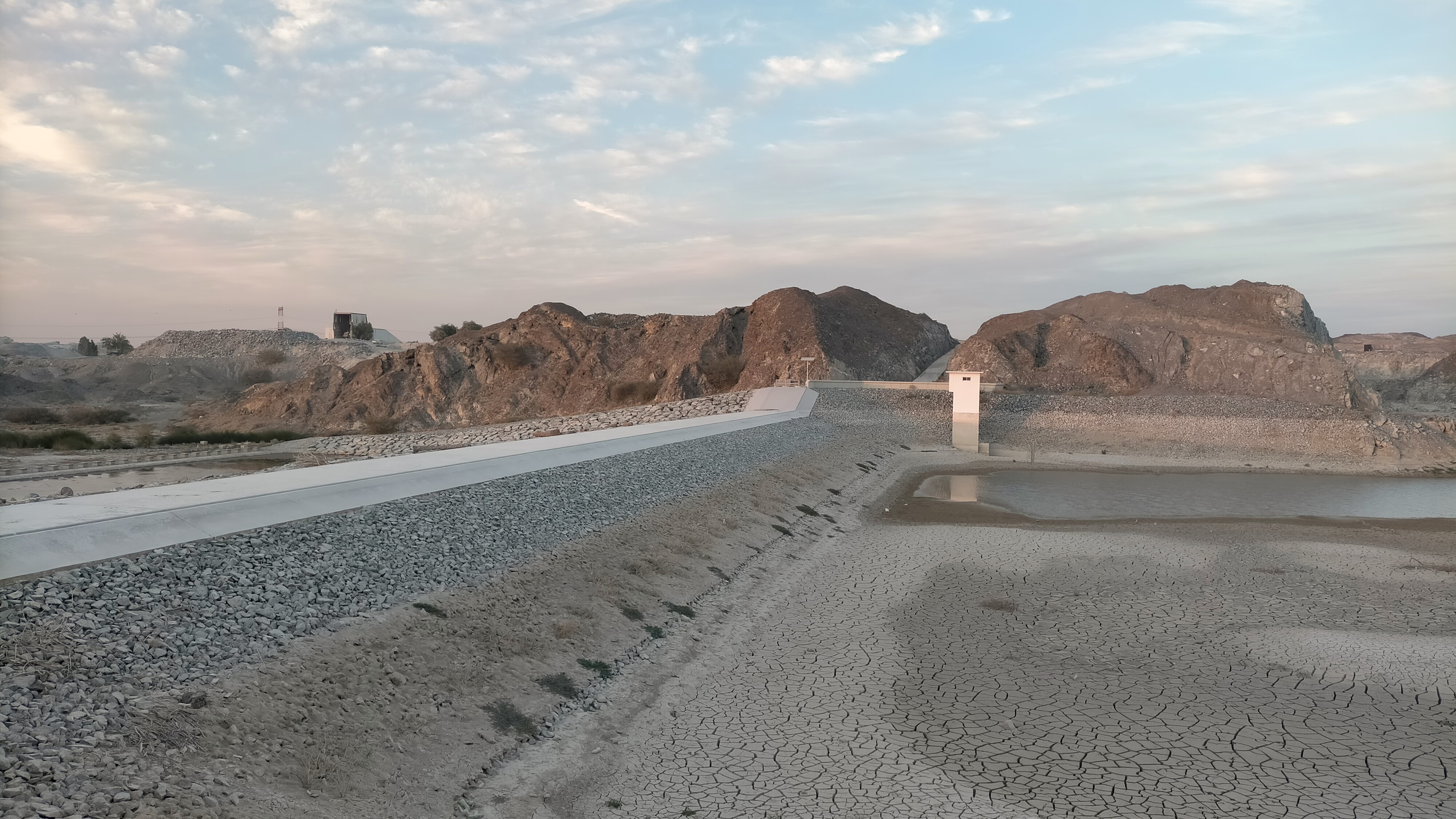
Wadi Sifuni Dam / Wadi Sfni Dam. Emirate of Ras Al Khaimah

Like most wadis in the United Arab Emirates, Wadi Sifuni is prone to severe flooding.

To prevent the risk of flash floods and increase the groundwater recharge potential, a dam, 8 m (26 ft) high, with a reservoir area of 0.15 km^{2} (0.058 mi^{2}) and a capacity of 0.6 million cubic meters, called the Wadi Sfni Dam (coordinates: 25°11′27″N, 56°02′32″E), was built in 2001 in the Wadi Sifuni channel, 3.5 km (2.2 mi) before its mouth.

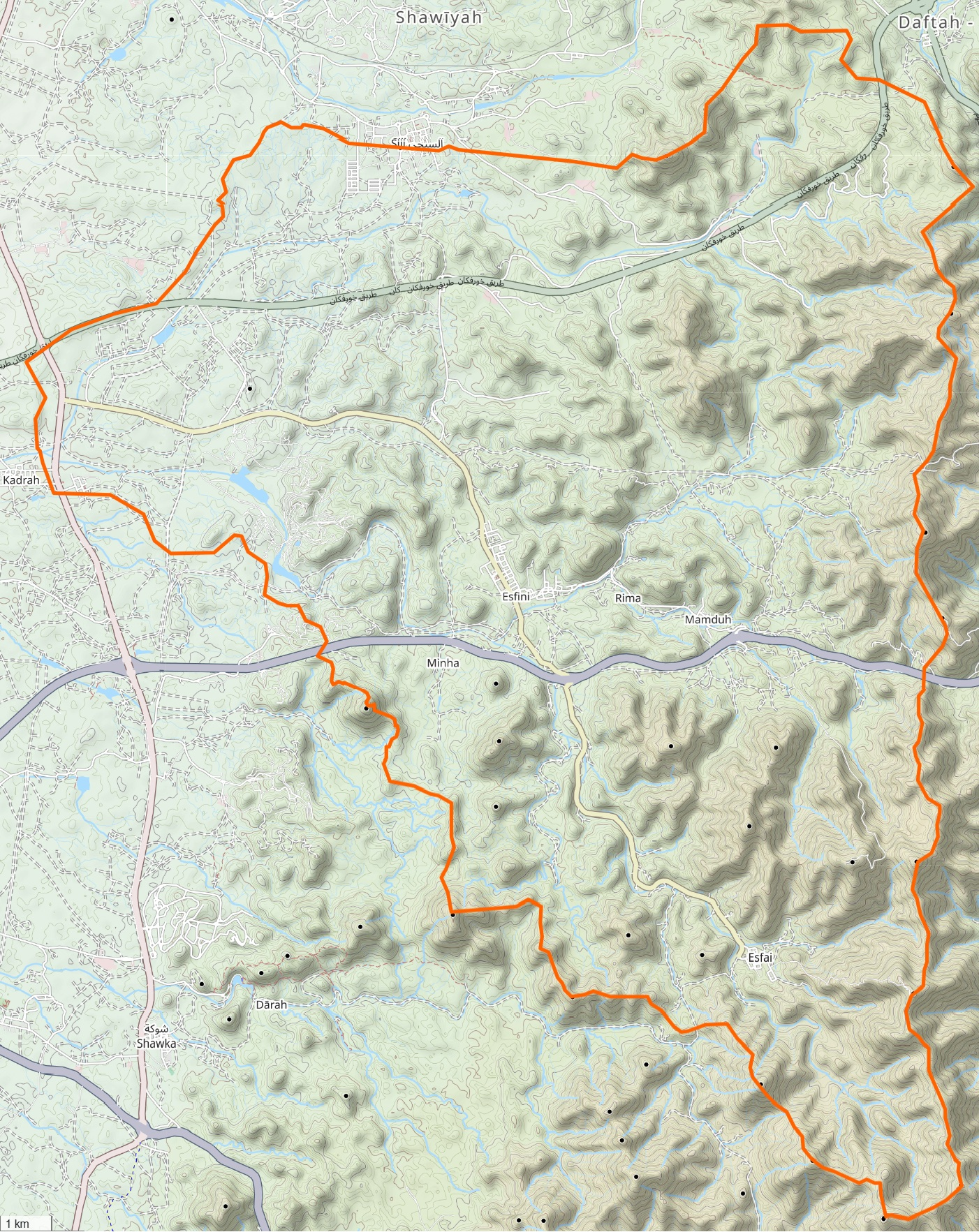
Wadi Sifuni & Wadi Ashwani drainage basin. Size: 216 km^{2} (83 mi^{2}).

Upstream of the former, next to the mouth of Wadi Mamduh in the Wadi Sifuni, a second dam, 11.5 m (38 ft) high, with a reservoir area of 0.086 km^{2} (0.033 mi^{2}) and a capacity of 0.21 million cubic metres, was built in 2002. It is called Mamduh Dam (coordinates: 25°10′17″N, 56°06′30″E).

== Toponymy ==
Alternative names: Wadi Sfini, Wadi Sifni, Wādī Sifūnī, Wadi Isfini, Wadi Sfuni, Wādī Iṣfani, Wadi Asfani, Wadi Sfni.

The name of Wadi Sifuni (with that same spelling), its tributaries, mountains and nearby towns, was recorded in the documentation and maps produced between 1950 and 1960 by the British Arabist, cartographer, military officer and diplomat Julian F. Walker, during the work carried out to establish the borders between the then called Trucial States, later completed by the Ministry of Defence of the United Kingdom, on maps at a scale of 1:100,000 published in 1971.

In the National Atlas of the United Arab Emirates it appears with the spelling Wādī Iṣfani (Arabic: وادي إصفني).

== Population ==
The area of Wadi Sifuni and its upper course (Wadi Baqarah) was populated mainly by the Quwayd / Quwayyid tribal area.

== See also ==
- List of wadis of the United Arab Emirates
- List of mountains in the United Arab Emirates
- List of wadis of Oman
- List of mountains in Oman
