= List of wadis of the United Arab Emirates =

List of wadis of the UAE

The United Arab Emirates does not have any permanent rivers, but does have wadis, a permanently or intermittently dry riverbed. This is a list of wadis in United Arab Emirates arranged alphabetically.

== A ==
- Wadi Abadilah, in Fujairah
- Wadi Afiya, in Ras Al Khaimah
- Wadi Ajali / Wādī ‘Ajalī, (tributary of Wadi Al Fay), in Fujairah.
- Wadi Arar / Wadi Ar'ar, (tributary of Wādī ‘Asimah), in Fujairah and Ras Al Khaimah
- Wadi Arus / Wādī ‘Arūs, (tributary of Wādī Shāh), in Ras Al Khaimah
- Wadi Ashwani / Wādī ‘Ashwānī / Wādī Al ‘Ishwānī (tributary of Wadi Sifuni / Wadi Sifni), in Ras Al Khaimah (Note: Riverbed partially destroyed by the activity of large quarries.)
- Wadi Asimah / Wādī ‘Asimah (tributary of Wādī Sidr), in Ras Al Khaimah
- Wadi Atmar (tributary of Wadi Bih), in Ras Al Khaimah
- Wadi Awsaq / Wadi Awsaq / Wādī Awsāq (tributary of Wadi Tawiyean), in Fujairah
- Wadi Al Aym / Wādī ‘Ayīm, in Ras Al Khaimah

== B ==
- Wadi Bakhit, in Ras Al Khaimah
- Wadi Baqal (tributary of Wadi Nahela), in Ras Al Khaimah
- Wadi Baqarah (tributary of Wadi Sifuni / Wadi Sifni), in Ras Al Khaimah
- Wadi Barid / Wādī Bārid (tributary of Wadi Al Munay / Wadi Munay`i), in Ras Al Khaimah
- Wadi Barut / Wādī Barut (tributary of Wadi Ghalilah), in Ras Al Khaimah
- Wadi Bih / Wādī Al-Bayḥ / Wādī al Bīḩ, in Ras Al Khaimah, and Oman
- Wadi Bu Faraj / Wādī Bū Faraj (tributary of Wadi Qor), in Ras Al Khaimah
- Wadi Bu Harman / Wādī Bū Ḥarmān (tributary of Wadi Al Munay / Wadi Munay`i), in Ras Al Khaimah

== D ==
- Wadi Daftah / Wadi Deftah / Wadi Diftah, (tributary of Wadi Ham), in Ras Al Khaimah.
- Wadi Danhah / Wādī Z̧anḩah / Wadi Dhanhah, (tributary of Wadi Al Fay), in Fujairah.

== E ==
- Wadi Ejili / Wadi Al Ejili / Wādī Al 'Ijēlī / Wadi Ayaili, in Ras Al Khaimah
- Wadi Esfai / Wadi Sfai / Wadi Isfai, (tributary of Wadi Sifuni / Wadi Sfuni / Wadi Sifni), in Ras Al Khaimah

== F ==
- Wadi Faqara / Wādī Faqarah, in Ras Al Khaimah
- Wadi Fara / Wādī al Fara‘ / Wādī Al Far, in Ras Al Khaimah
- Wadi Farfar / Wādī Furfār, in Fujairah.
- Wadi Al Fay / Wādī Al Fay’, in Fujairah.

== G ==
- Wadi Ghabas / Wādī Ghabas (tributary of Wadi Bih), in Ras Al Khaimah
- Wadi Al Gabbah / Wādī Al Gabbah (tributary of Wadi Sha'am), in Ras Al Khaimah
- Wadi Al Ghafiyyah, in Ras Al Khaimah
- Wadi Ghalan (tributary of Wadi Yushemah / Wadi Ghushaymah / Wadi Ghashemah), in Fujairah
- Wadi Ghalfa / Wadi Gulfa (tributary of Wadi Hadf), in Ajman
- Wadi Ghalilah / Wādī Ghalīlah, in Ras Al Khaimah
- Wadi Ghayl / Wādī Ghayl (tributary of Wadi Qada'ah), in Ras Al Khaimah
- Wadi Ghayl / Wādī Ghayl (tributary of Wadi Wurayah), in Fujairah
- Wadi Ghulayyil Khun (tributary of Wadi Wurayah), in Fujairah

== H ==
- Wadi Hadf / Wadi Hadaf / Wādī Ḩadf (tributary of Wadi Hatta), in Ajman, Dubai and Oman
- Wadi Halhal / Wādī Ḩalḩal (tributary of Wadi Ghalilah), in Ras Al Khaimah
- Wadi Halu / Wādī Halū / Wadi Khalu (tributary of Wadi Naqab), in Ras Al Khaimah
- Wadi Ham / Wādī Hām, in Fujairah
- Wadi Haqil / Wādī Ḩaqīl, in Ras Al Khaimah
- Wadi Hatta / Wādī Ḩattā, in Dubai and Oman
- Wadi Al Hawari, in Ras Al Khaimah
- Wadi Al Hayilah / Wadi Hiyaila / Wadi Hiyailah (tributary of Wadi al Bih), in Ras Al Khaimah
- Wadi Hayl / Wādī Ḩayl / Wādī Al Ḩēl, in Fujairah.
- Wadi Helo / Wādī Al Ḥilū / Wadi Hilu, in Sharjah, Fujairah and Oman
- Wadi Al Himriyyah (tributary of Wadi Mu'taridah / Wadi Mutarid) in Fujairah and Ras Al Khaimah
- Wadi Al Hiyar / Wādī Hiyār (tributary of Wadi Khabb and sub-tributary of Wadi Tawiyean), in Fujairah
- Wadi Hubayb / Wādī Hubayb (tributary of Wadi Qor), in Ras Al Khaimah
- Wadi Al Huwaybit / Wādī al Ḩuwaybīţ / Wādī Liḩwе̄biţ, in Fujairah

== J ==
- Wadi Al Jazeer / Wadi al Yazir, in Ajman and Oman
- Wadi Jib / Wādī Jib (tributary of Wadi Shah), in Ras Al Khaimah

== K ==
- Wadi Kadra, in Ras Al Khaimah.
- Wadi Khabb / Wādī Khabb (tributary of Wadi Ghalilah), in Ras Al Khaimah
- Wadi Khabb / Wādī Khabb (tributary of Wadi Tawiyean), in Fujairah
- Wadi Al Kharas / Wadi Likhras / Wādī Likhras (tributary of Wadi Khabb and sub-tributary of Wadi Tawiyean), in Fujairah
- Wadi Al Khari / Wādī al Khārī (tributary of Wadi Shawka), in Ras Al Khaimah
- Wadi Al Kharus, in Ajman and Oman
- Wadi Al Khiway / Wādī Al Khiway (tributary of Wadi Khabb), in Ras Al Khaimah
- Wadi Al Khulaiban / Wadi Al Khileban (tributary of Wadi Hadf), in Ajman
- Wadi Al Khurush / Wādī Al Khurūsh (tributary of Wadi Tawiyean), in Fujairah
- Wādī Kirībā|Wadi Kiriba / Wādī Kirībā, in Ras Al Khaimah
- Wadi Kub (tributary of Wadi Mu'taridah / Wadi Mutarid) in Fujairah and Ras Al Khaimah

== L ==
- Wadi Laim / Wādī Līm (tributary of Wadi Hadf and sub-tributary of Wadi Hatta), in Ajman and Dubai
- Wadi Lamhah / Wādī Limḥah, in Emirate of Umm Al Quwain.
- Wadi Lil / Wādī Līl (tributary of Wadi Kub), in Fujairah
- Wadi Limarit / Wādī Limarit (tributary of Wadi Ham), in Ras Al Khaimah
- Wadi Lishan / Wādī Lishan (tributary of Wadi Hadf), in Ajman
- Wadi Litibah / Wādī Litibah (tributary of Wadi Ghalilah), in Ras Al Khaimah

== M ==
- Wadi Madha / Wadi Madhah / Wādī Maḩḑah, in Oman and Sharjah and Fujairah
- Wadi Madnan / Wādī Madnan (tributary of Wadi Naqab), in Ras Al Khaimah
- Wadi Malahah, in Ras Al Khaimah
- Wadi Mamduh / Wādī Mamdūḩ (tributary of Wadi Sifuni / Wadi Sifni), in Ras Al Khaimah
- Wadi Al Maryalen / Wādī Al Maryalе̄n (tributary of Wadi Sha'am), in Ras Al Khaimah
- Wadi Maydaq / Wādī Maydaq / Wādī Mе̄daq, in Fujairah
- Wadi May / Wādī Mayy / Wadi Mai / Wādī May (tributary of Wadi Rumh / Wadi Rumht), in Fujairah
- Wadi Mayy / Wādī Mayy (tributary of Wadi Shah), in Ras Al Khaimah
- Wadi Mayya / Wādī Al Mayyah (tributary of Wadi Awsaq, in Fujairah
- Wadi Al Midhnab / Wadi Madnah / Wādī Madnah (tributary of Wadi Bih), in Ras Al Khaimah
- Wadi Al Mikhebi / Wādī Al Mikhе̄bī (tributary of Wadi Bih), in Ras Al Khaimah
- Wadi Milah / Wādī Milāḩ (tributary of Wadi Qor), in Ras Al Khaimah
- Wadi Modaynah in Ras Al Khaimah
- Wadi Mudayq / Wādī Muḑayq / Wādī Al Madīq / Wadi Mutheiq, in Sharjah and Fujairah (tributary of Wadi Helo)
- Wadi Wadi Muhayli / Wādī Muhaylī (tributary of Wadi Naqab), in Ras Al Khaimah
- Wadi Al Munay / Wadi Munay`i / Wadi Munay (tributary of Wadi Qor / Wādī al Qūr), in Ras Al Khaimah
- Wadi Murtaqam / Wadi Murtaqau (tributary of Wadi Wurayah), in Fujairah
- Wadi Al Mustab / Wadi Al Mestib (tributary of Wadi Hadf), in Ajman
- Wadi Mu'taridah / Wadi Mutarid / Wadi Al Mithaddim, in Fujairah and Ras Al Khaimah

== N ==
- Wadi Nahela / Wādī Ghēl / Wadi Ghil, in Ras Al Khaimah
- Wadi Naqab / Wādī Naqab, in Ras Al Khaimah and Oman
- Wadi Naqat (tributary of Wadi Shah), in Ras Al Khaimah
- Wadi Nikid / Wādī Nikid / Wadi Naqid (tributary of Wadi Al Kharas and sub-tributary of Wadi Khabb), in Fujairah

== Q ==
- Wadi Qada'ah / Wādī Kidā'ah (tributary of Wadi Bih), in Ras Al Khaimah, and Oman
- Wadi Qaf'ah / Wādī Qaf'ah (tributary of Wadi Sha'am), in Ras Al Khaimah
- Wadi Qimah / Wādī Qimah (tributary of Wadi Hatta), in Dubai
- Wadi Qor / Wādī al Qūr / Wadi al-Qawr, in Ras Al Khaimah and Oman

== R ==
- Wadi Ra'alat Ad Daman (tributary of Wadi Ghabas), in Ras Al Khaimah
- Wadi Rahabah / Wādī Raḩbah, in Ras Al Khaimah
- Wadi Ar Ra'ilah (tributary of Wadi Bih), in Ras Al Khaimah
- Wadi Ar Ribiyyah / Wadi Raibiya / Wadi Ar Rebiyyah, in Ras Al Khaimah
- Wadi Riyamah / Wādī Riyāmah / Wadi Riyama (tributary of Wadi Sayraq and sub-tributary of Wadi Tawiyean)
- Wadi Rumht / Wādī Rumḩ / Wadi Ramth, in Fujairah

== S ==
- Wadi Sadakh / Wādī Sidakh / Wādī Sadakh (tributary of Wadi Awsaq and sub-tributary of Wadi Tawiyean), in Fujairah
- Wadi Safad / Wādī Şafad, in Fujairah
- Wadi Safat / Wādī Suftah (tributary of Wadi Kub), in Ras Al Khaimah
- Wadi Saham in Fujairah
- Wadi Sal (tributary of Wadi Halu, and sub-tributary of Wadi Naqab), in Ras Al Khaimah
- Wadi Sal Dhayah (Next to the village and farming area of Sal Dhayah, at the foot of Jabal Rams), in Ras Al Khaimah
- Wadi Salmadan (tributary of Wadi Al Kharas and sub-tributary of Wadi Khabb), in Fujairah and Ras Al Khaimah
- Wadi Samarat (tributary of Wadi Madnan), in Ras Al Khaimah
- Wadi Sawabi (tributary of Wadi Khabb and sub-tributary of Wadi Tawiyean), in Fujairah
- Wadi Sawamia (tributary of Wadi Scharab), in Ajman and Oman
- Wadi Saybitalma / Wādī Saybitalmā (tributary of Wadi Ashwani ), in Ras Al Khaimah
- Wadi Sayraq / Wādī Sayraq (tributary of Wadi Tawiyean), in Fujairah
- Wadi Sena / Wadi Sinnah / Wādī Sanah, in Fujairah
- Wadi Sha'am / Wādī ash Sha‘m / Wādī Shaam, in Ras Al Khaimah
- Wadi Shah / Wādī Shāh (tributary of Wadi Bih), in Ras Al Khaimah
- Wadi Shakh / Wādī Shakh (tributary of Wadi Khabb and sub-tributary of Wadi Tawiyean), in Fujairah
- Wadi Sharm / Wādī Sharm / Ghalīlat Da‘‘ān, in Fujairah
- Wadi Ash Sharyah / Wādī Ash Sharyah / Wadi Al Sheria (tributary of Wadi Khabb and sub-tributary of Wadi Tawiyean), in Fujairah
- Wadi Shawka / Wādī Shokah / Wādī Shawkah, in Ras Al Khaimah
- Wadi Shie / Wādī Shī in Khor Fakkan, Sharjah
- Wadi Shis / Wādī Ash Shīş / Wadi Shees (tributary of Wadi Madha), in Sharjah and Oman.
- Wadi Shisah / Wādī Shīşah (tributary of Wādī Shāh), in Ras Al Khaimah
- Wadi Shuway / Wādī Shuway (tributary of Wadi Ham), in Fujairah
- Wadi Sidr / Wādī Sidr in Fujairah
- Wadi Sifuni / Wadi Sifuni / Wadi Sifuni / Wadi Sfuni / Wadi Sifni, in Ras Al Khaimah
- Wadi Siji / Wādī Sījī, in Fujairah and Ras Al Khaimah

== T ==
- Wadi Tarabat / Wādī Tarabat near Al Ain in Abu Dhabi,
- Wadi Tawiyean / Wadi Al Tawiyaen / Wādī Ţawīyayn, in Fujairah
- Wadi Tayyibah in Fujairah
- Wadi Thayb / Wādī Thayb / Wadi Theeb, tributary of Wadi Safad, in Fujairah
- Wadi Thouban / Wadi Toban / Wādī Thawbān, in Fujairah
- Wadi Tuwa / Wadi Tawa / Wādī Tawāh (tributary of Wadi Al Munay / Wadi Munay`i), in Ras Al Khaimah

== U ==
- Wadi Umm al Ghat / Wādī Umm al Ghāt (tributary of Wadi Qor), in Ras Al Khaimah
- Wadi Ushail / Wādī Ushayl (tributary of Wadi Qor), in Ras Al Khaimah

== W ==
- Wadi Wa‘bayn / Wādī Wa‘bayn / Wadi Wa'abain (tributary of Wadi Khabb and sub-tributary of Wadi Tawiyean), in Fujairah
- Wadi Wamm / Wādī Wamm / Wādī Wam, in Fujairah.
- Wadi Wayqah / Wādī Wayqah (tributary of Wadi Siji), in Fujairah
- Wadi Wurayah / Wādī Wurayyah, in Fujairah

== Y ==
- Wadi Yabsah / Wadi Jabsah, tributary of Wadi Ham, in Fujairah.
- Ghalil Al Yafar, (tributary of Wadi Jib), in Ras Al Khaimah
- Wadi Yushemah / Wadi Ghushaymah / Wadi Ghashemah / Wādī Al Yishе̄mah (tributary of Wadi Wurayah), in Fujairah

== Z ==
- Wadi Zibat / Wādī Zaybāt, (tributary of Wadi Bih), in Ras Al Khaimah and Oman
- Wadi Zikt / Wādī Zikt, in Fujairah
- Wadi Zuqaybah / Wādī As Siqе̄bah (tributary of Wadi Asimah), in Ras Al Khaimah
- Wadi Zireb (tributary of Wadi Rahabah), in Ras Al Khaimah

== See also ==
- List of countries without rivers
- List of wadis of Oman
- List of mountains in the United Arab Emirates
- List of mountains in Oman
