= Wadi Maydaq =

- Location within United Arab Emirates
- Coordinates: 25°20′20″N 56°6′14″E
- Country: United Arab Emirates
- Emirate: Fujairah
- Elevation: 405 m (1,329 ft)

Wadi Maydaq is a seasonal watercourse in the Hajar Mountains of Fujairah, United Arab Emirates. The wadi runs from the village of Marbad, through the village of Maydaq, and down to the Ajman exclave of Manama.

The wadi is guarded by the derelict Maydaq Fort, a watchtower situated in the middle of the most agriculturally developed stretch of the watercourse. The wadi is traditionally associated with settlements of the Sharqiyin tribe. It is a popular destination for day trippers and hikers, celebrated for its natural beauty. Conservationists have identified rare species of fauna in the wadi, including digger wasps.

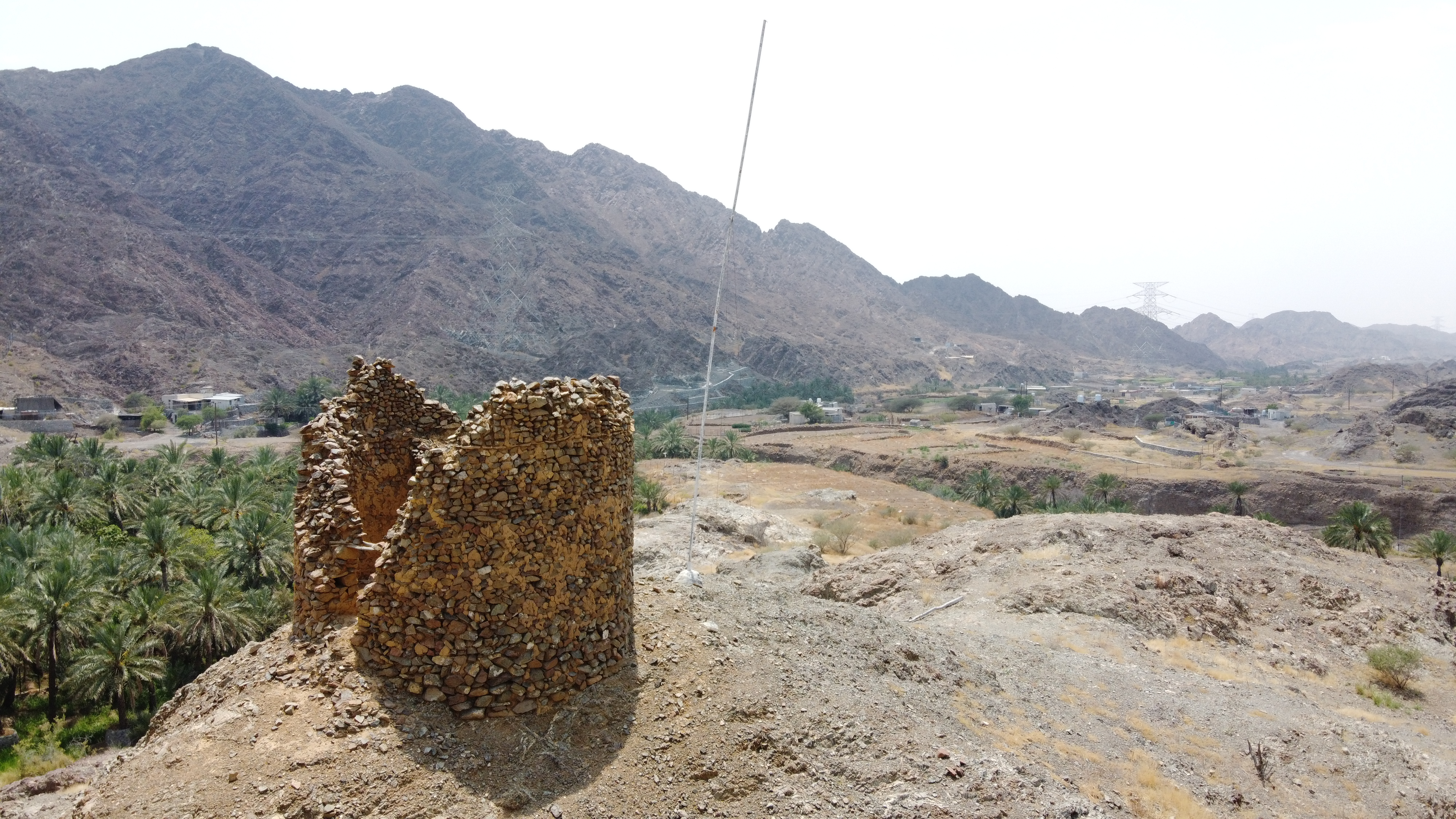
The derelict Maydaq Fort in the Wadi Maydaq

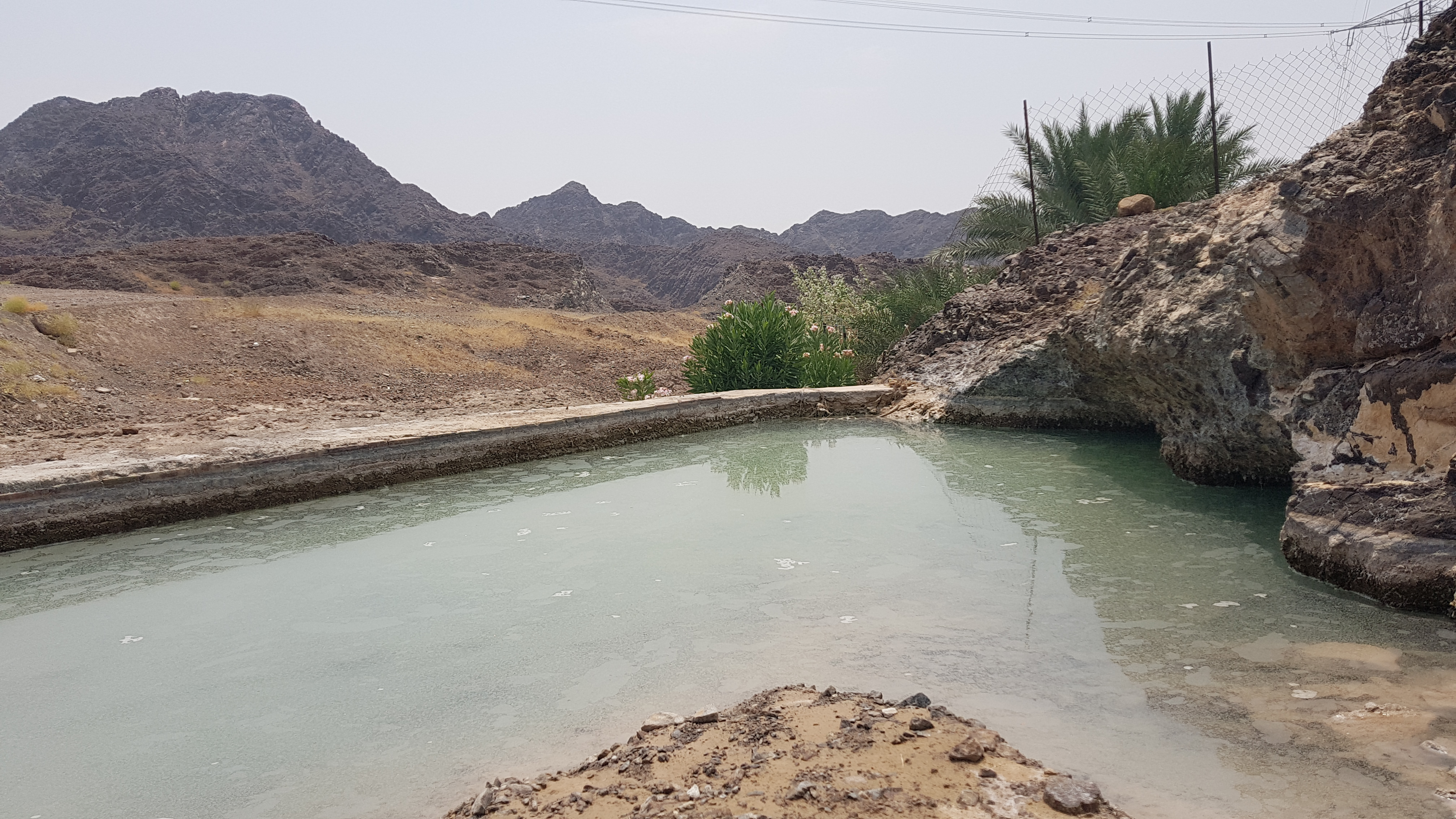
The 'Blue Pool' in the Wadi Maydaq

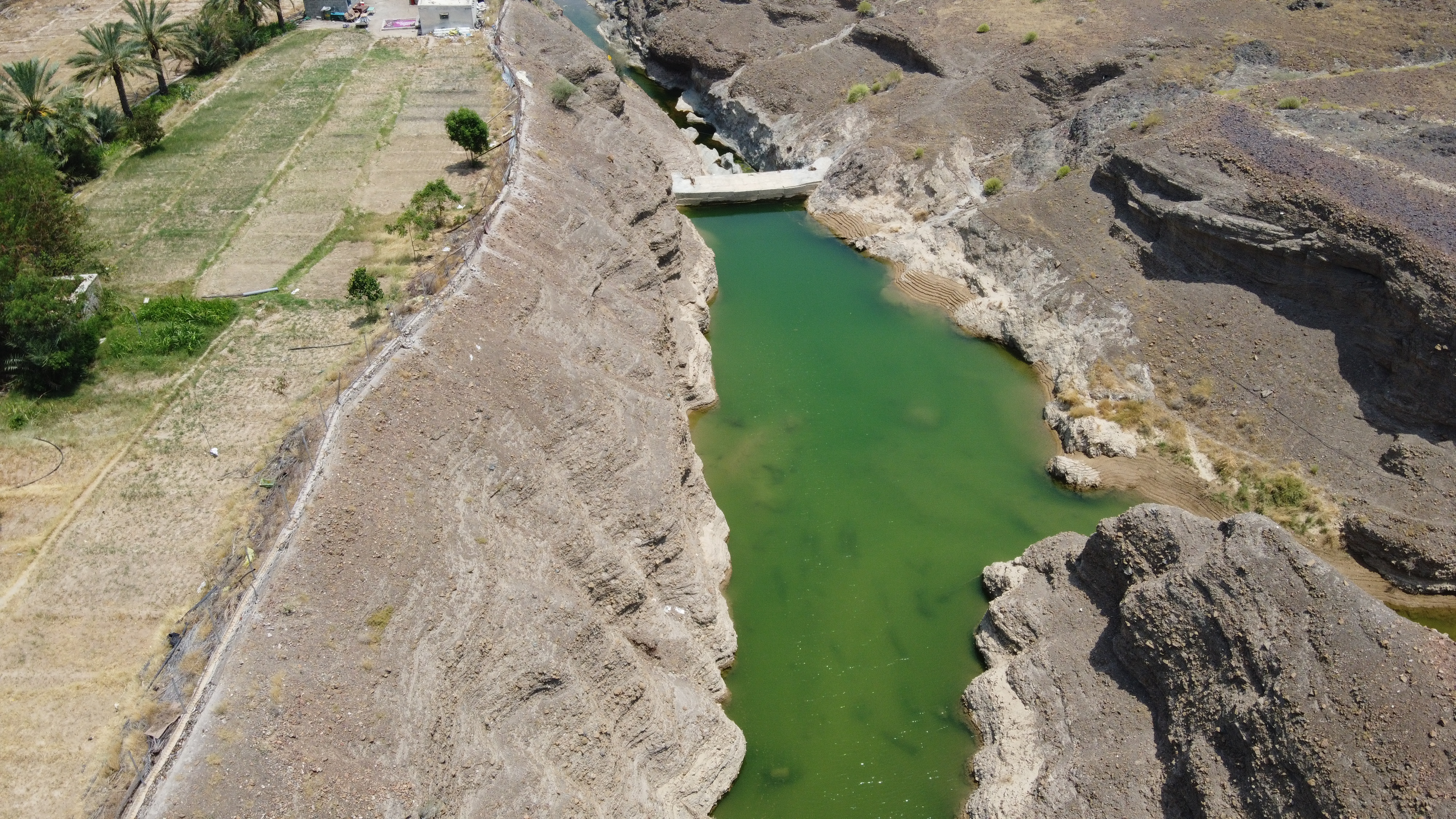
Wadi Maydaq dammed at Marbad; the wadi would otherwise flow into the Wadi Siji.

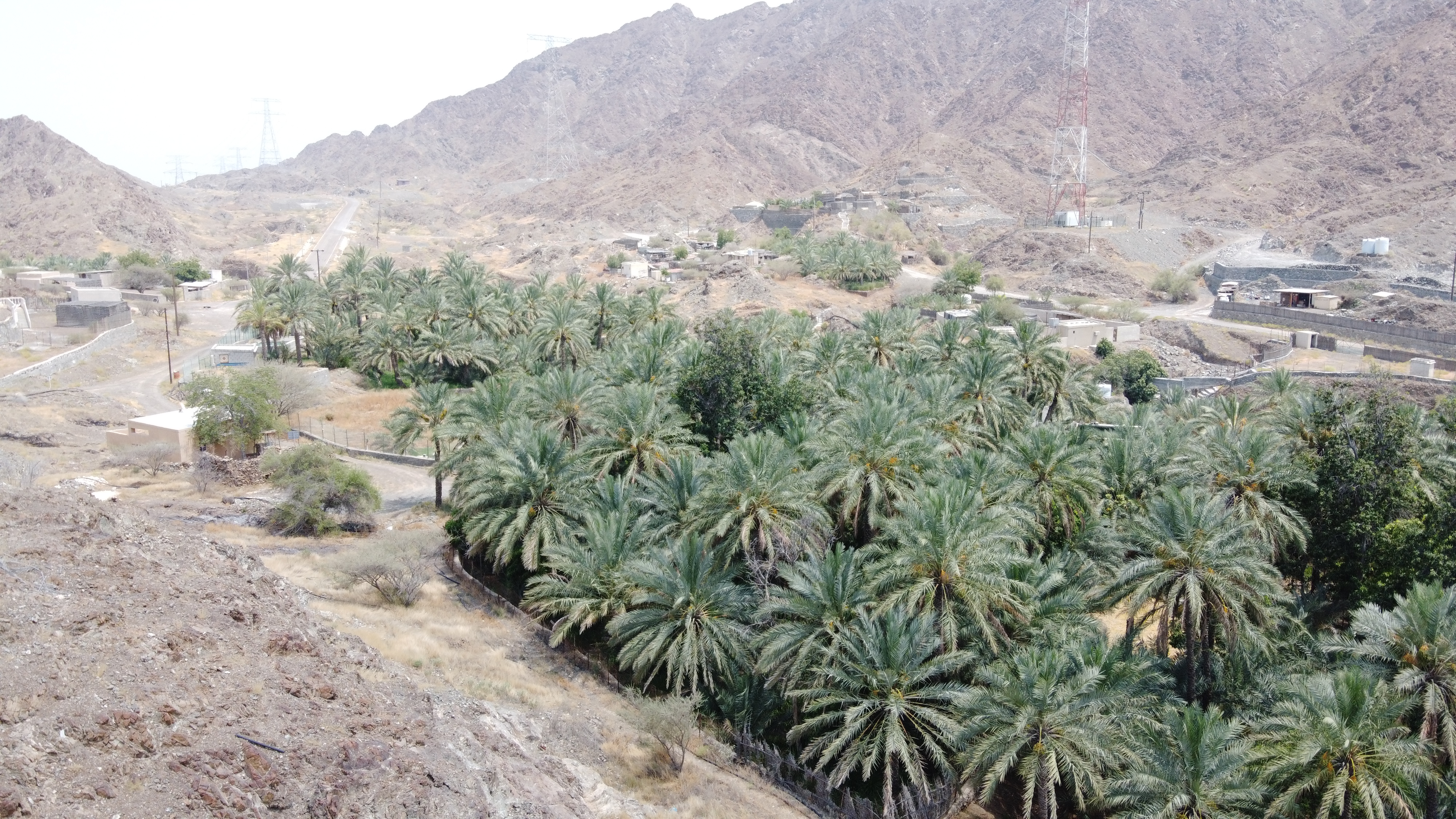
Wadi Maydaq in Fujairah, UAE

== See also ==
- List of wadis of the United Arab Emirates
