= Wadi Kadra =

- Location within United Arab Emirates
- Coordinates: 25°11′N 56°02′E
- Country: United Arab Emirates
- Emirate: Ras Al Khaimah
- Elevation: 99 m (325 ft)

Wadi Kadra is a seasonal watercourse in the Hajar Mountains of Ras Al Khaimah, United Arab Emirates.

The wadi runs parallel to the Maliha-Fujairah road (E84) from Sifuni to the Kadra dam adjacent exit 58 on that road. It was one of the first findsites of the rare damselfly Ischnura nursei. The 7.8km track is a popular hiking destination.

Wadi Kadra is also notable for hosting the largest wild population of the rare and poisonous plant, Devil’s Thorn or Devil’s Trumpet Datura stramonium, in the UAE. Despite its wealth of flora and fauna, it is also home to a number of quarries and rock crushing operations.

== See also ==
- List of wadis of the United Arab Emirates
