= Wadi Bih =

River in Oman and United Arab Emirates

Coordinates: 25°49′14.67″N 56°07′27.94″E

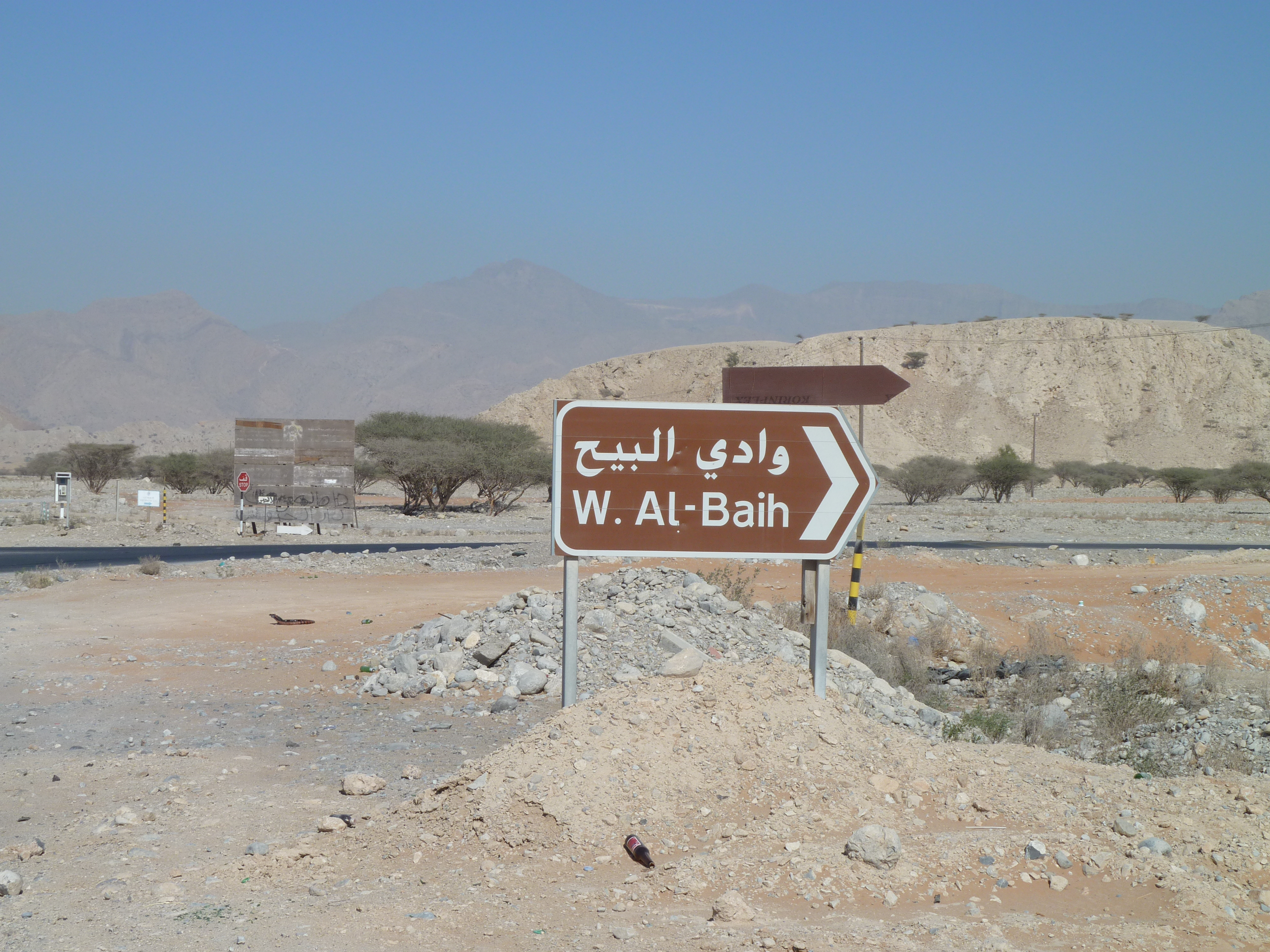
Sign for the wadi

Wadi Bih (Arabic: وَادِي ٱلْبَيْح) is a wadi that crosses the North-Western Hajar Mountains from the United Arab Emirates, and traversing Oman before returning to the UAE. From the West to the East, the crossing originates in Ras Al Khaimah, before cutting through the Omani exclave at the tip of the Musandam Peninsula, past the village of Zighi and into Dibba Al-Baya in Oman and then re-entering the UAE at Fujairah at Dibba Al-Hisn, on the Gulf of Oman. The wadi is a popular location for birdwatchers.

Access to Wadi Bih requires a border crossing between Oman and UAE.

== Wadi Bih Run ==
The popular Wadi Bih 72 km (45 miles) ultramarathon takes place each year on the Musandam Peninsula in Oman on the first weekend of February. The 72-km solo event is an out and back course, starting at Dibba and climbing 36km into mountainous terrain before the turnaround, taking some five hours to complete. It was founded in 1993.

== Gallery ==
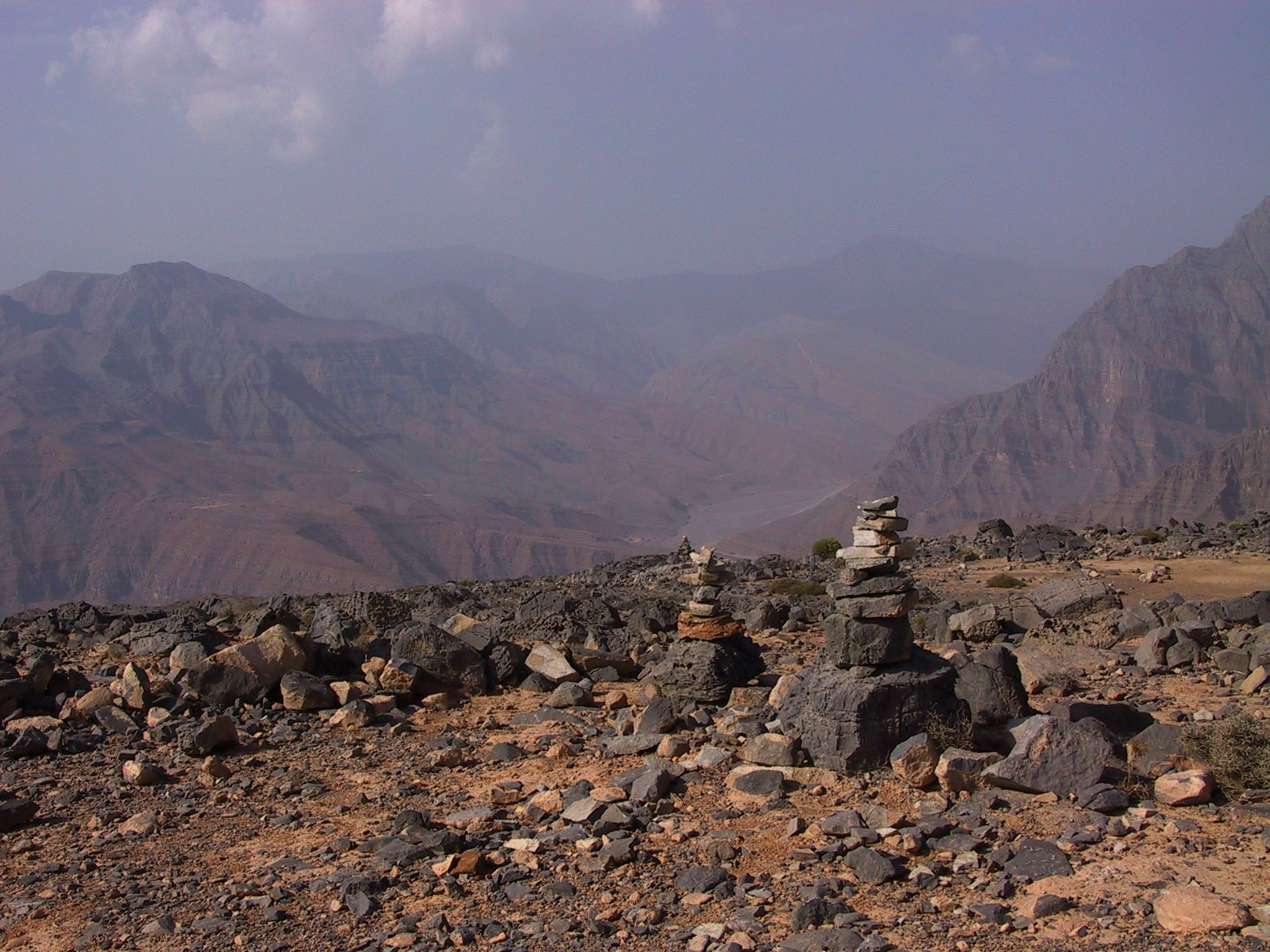
View of Wadi Bih

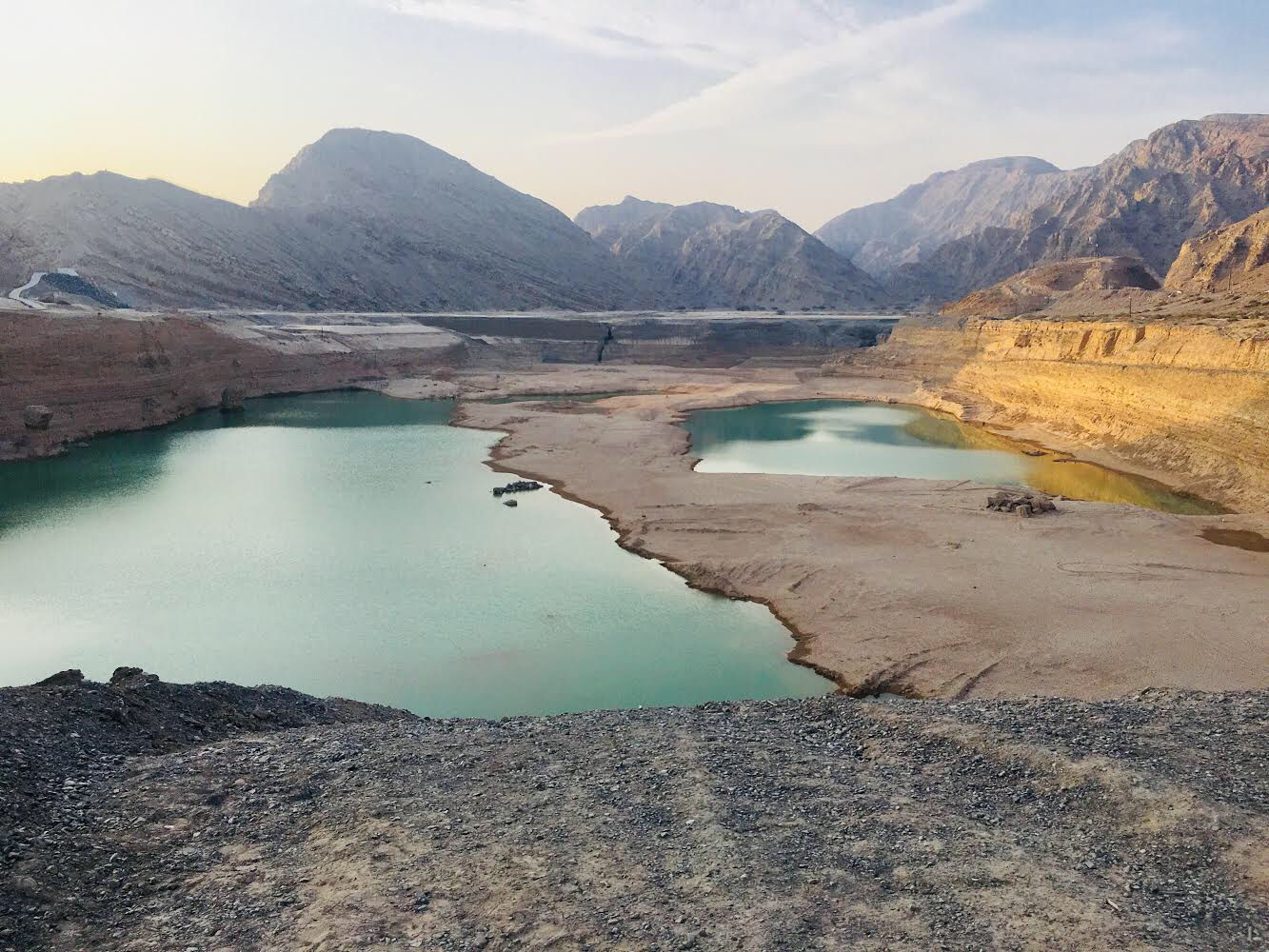
The wadi with the North-Western Hajar Mountains in the background. Note that Jebel Jais, the UAE's highest mountain, is nearby.

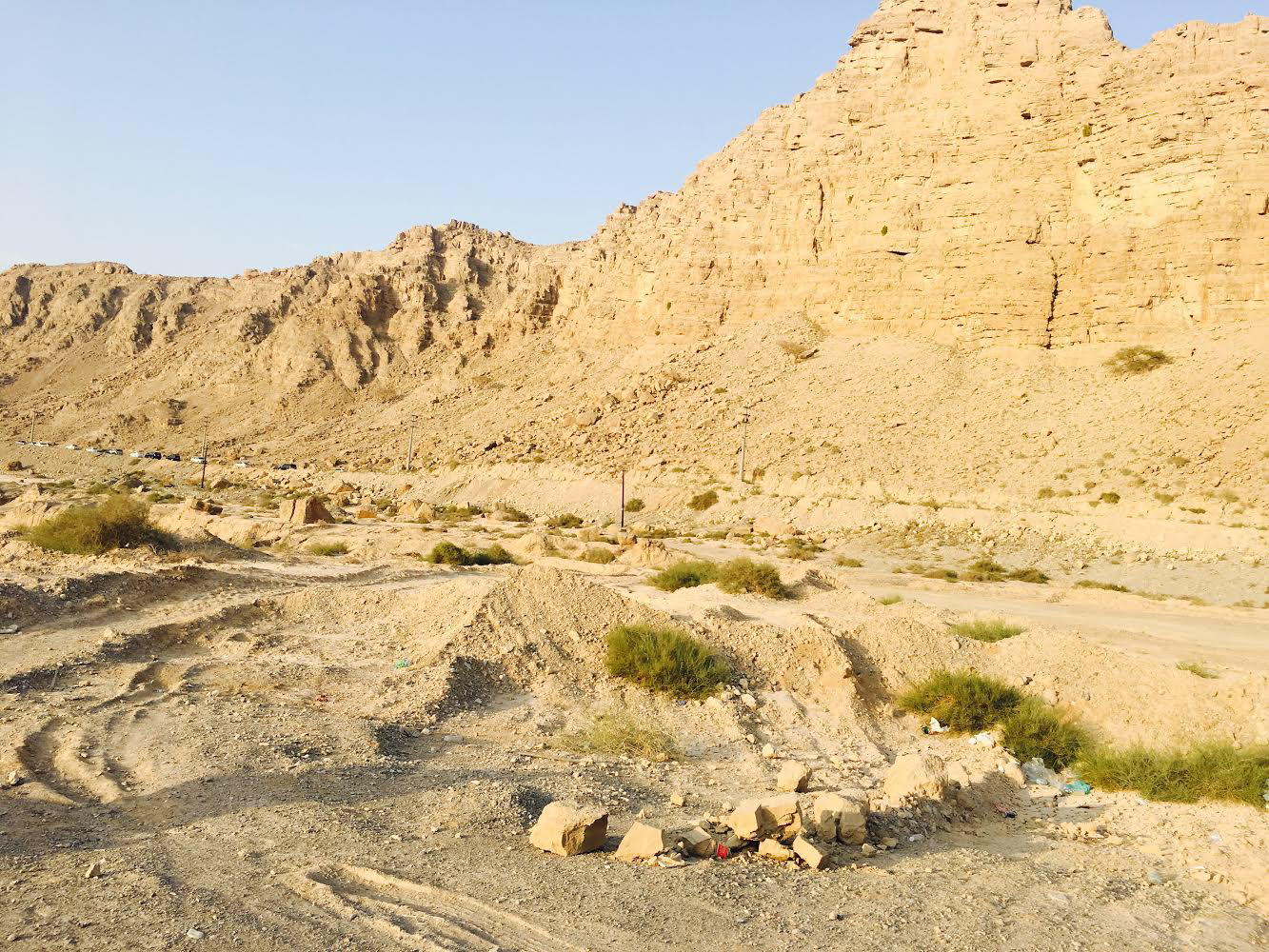

== See also ==
- List of wadis of the United Arab Emirates
