= Maydaq =

- Location within United Arab Emirates
- Coordinates: 25°20′20″N 56°6′14″E
- Country: United Arab Emirates
- Emirate: Fujairah
- Elevation: 405 m (1,329 ft)

Maydaq is the name of a wadi and also a settlement in Fujairah, United Arab Emirates (UAE), traditionally associated with the Sharqiyin tribe. Wadi Maydaq is a popular venue for hiking and offroading.

Alternative Names: Madaq, Madāq, Maidaq, Maydaq
