= Wadi Sha'am =

Wadi in UAE

Wadi Sha'am Wādī Sha‘am
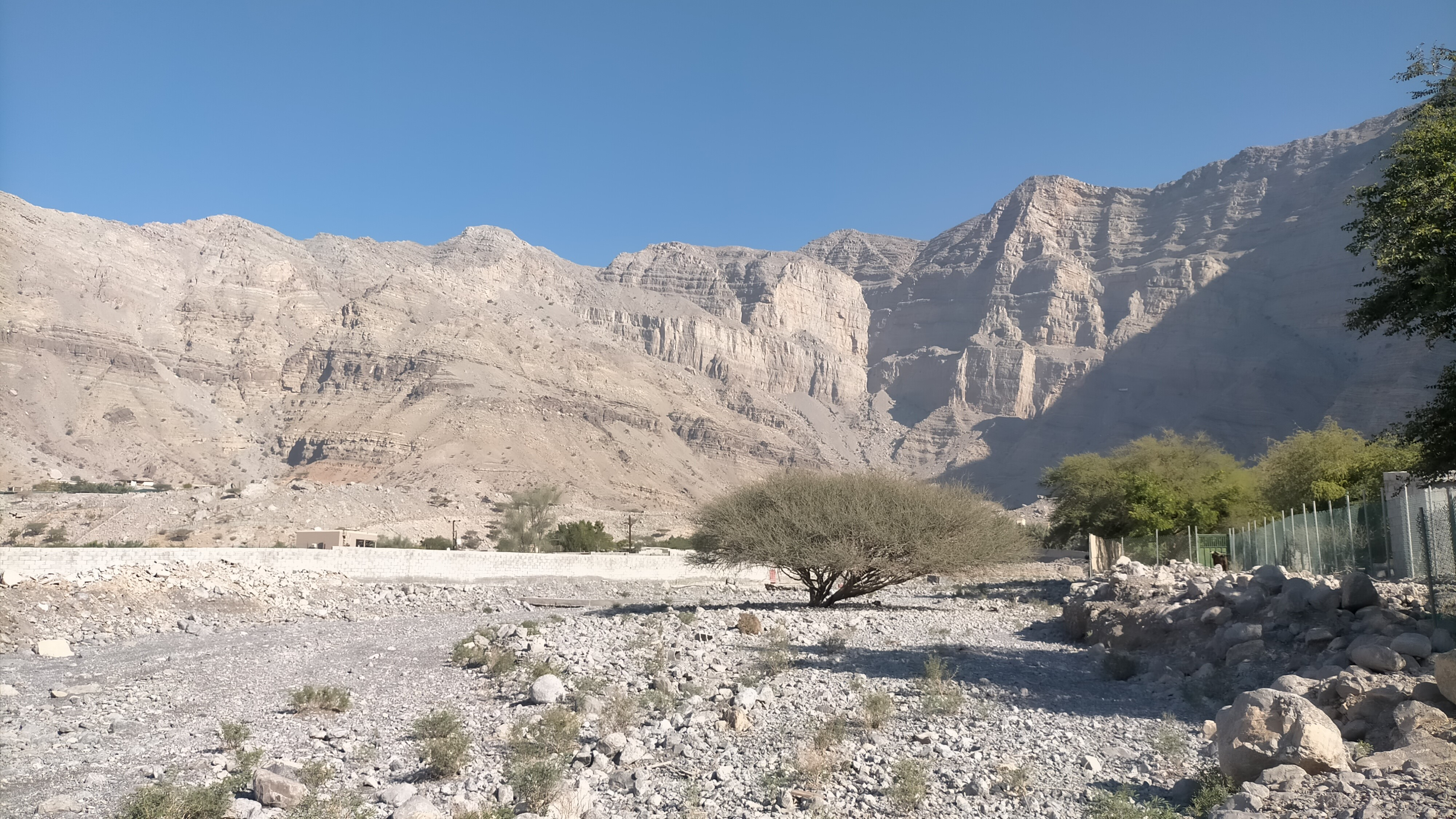
- Wadi Sha'am. Beginning of the middle course

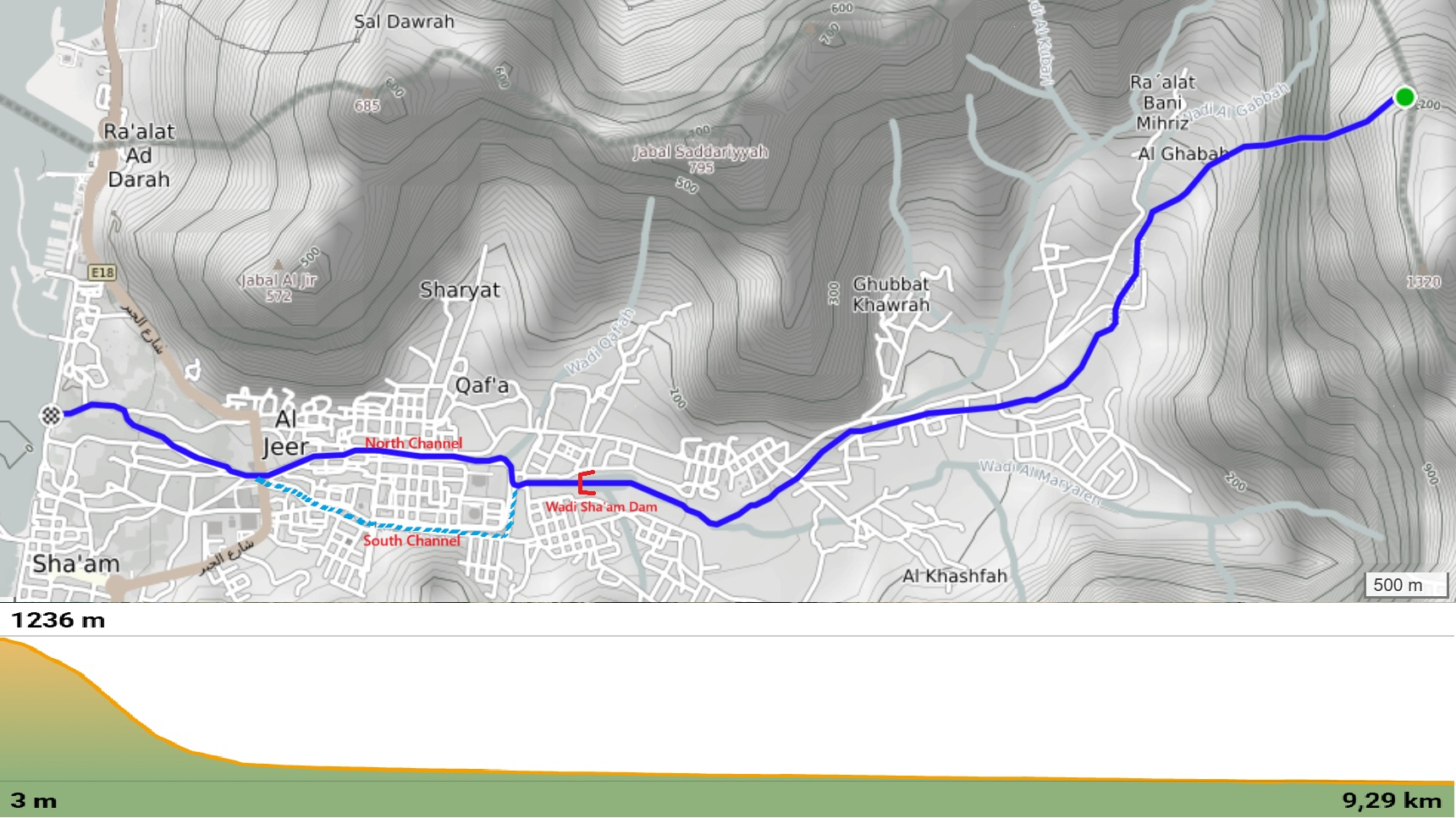
- Course and topographic profile of Wadi Sha'am

- Location within United Arab Emirates Location within Persian Gulf Location within West and Central Asia
- Native name: وادي شعم (Arabic)

Location
- Country: United Arab Emirates
- Emirate: Ras Al Khaimah

Physical characteristics
- Source: On the high cliffs located to the east of the drainage divide, along the eastern border with Oman
  - elevation: 1,230 m (4,040 ft), approximately
- Mouth: Gulf of Oman, between the cities of Al Jeer and Sha'am
  - coordinates: 26°02′12″N 56°05′03″E
  - elevation: 0 m (0 ft)
- Length: 9.3 km (5.8 mi)
- Basin size: 35 km^{2} (14 mi^{2})

Basin features
- Progression: Wadi. Intermittent flow
- River system: Wadi Sha'am
- Population: 2539 (2023)
- Tributaries
  - left: Wadi Al Maryalen
  - right: Wadi Al Gabbah, Wadi Qaf'a

Wadi Sha'am (Arabic: وادي شعم, romanized: Wādī Sha‘am) is a valley or dry river with ephemeral or intermittent flow, flowing almost exclusively during the rainy season, located in the eastern United Arab Emirates, in the emirate of Ras Al Khaimah.

It is the northernmost of the wadis in the United Arab Emirates, and forms its own drainage basin of 35 km^{2} (14 mi^{2}), bordered to the north and east by the Sultanate of Oman; to the south by the Wadi Ghalilah catchment basin, and to the west by the Persian Gulf.

This small valley, located on the edge and almost at sea level, is surrounded by mountains with high and vertical cliffs, in which spectacular waterfalls form when it rains torrentially.

Among the surrounding mountains, with a maximum height of 1,490 m (4,890 ft), the Jabal Khabb (1,145 m (3,757 ft)), the Aqabat Tibat (1,085 m (3,560 ft)), the Jabal Hudayd (1,035 m (3,396 ft)), the Jabal Qandus (954 m (3,130 ft)), the Jabal Saddariyyah (795 m (2,608 ft)) and the Jabal Al Jir (572 m (1,877 ft)), which, despite its modest height, constitutes an iconic landmark for the valley, due to its proximity to the two main population centers: the coastal cities of Sha'am and Al Jeer/Al Jir.

The entire Wadi Sha'am drainage basin contains approximately 30 independent streams, most of which are unnamed. The main tributaries of Wadi Sha'am are Wadi Al Gabbah, Wadi Al Maryalen, and Wadi Qaf'a.

== Course ==
Wadi Sha'am flows from east to west. Its main source is located on top of the cliff, next to the drainage divide, at an approximate altitude of 1,230 m (4,040 ft), and considering the initial section, in which it falls in a cascade towards the valley, it has a total length of approximately 9.3 km (5.8 mi).

At the beginning of its middle course, after its confluence with the Wadi Al Gabbah, it forms a well-defined channel, which as it advances through the central plain of the valley, gradually thins out and naturally forks into multiple braided channels, intertwined and interspersed with small islands of sediment.

However, as Wadi Sha'am approaches the coast, the presence of numerous homes, farms, and other structures along its banks increases, necessitating channelization works, especially from the point of its confluence with Wadi Al Maryalen, and as it passes through the city of Al Jeer/Al Jir, where the channel of the main wadi divides into two parallel channels that join at the end of the urban area.

At its mouth, the wadi runs through an area occupied mainly by agricultural plantations, protected by high walls and crisscrossed by numerous alleys, which in times of heavy rain act as drainage channels and channel its waters to the sea.

== Dams and Reservoirs ==
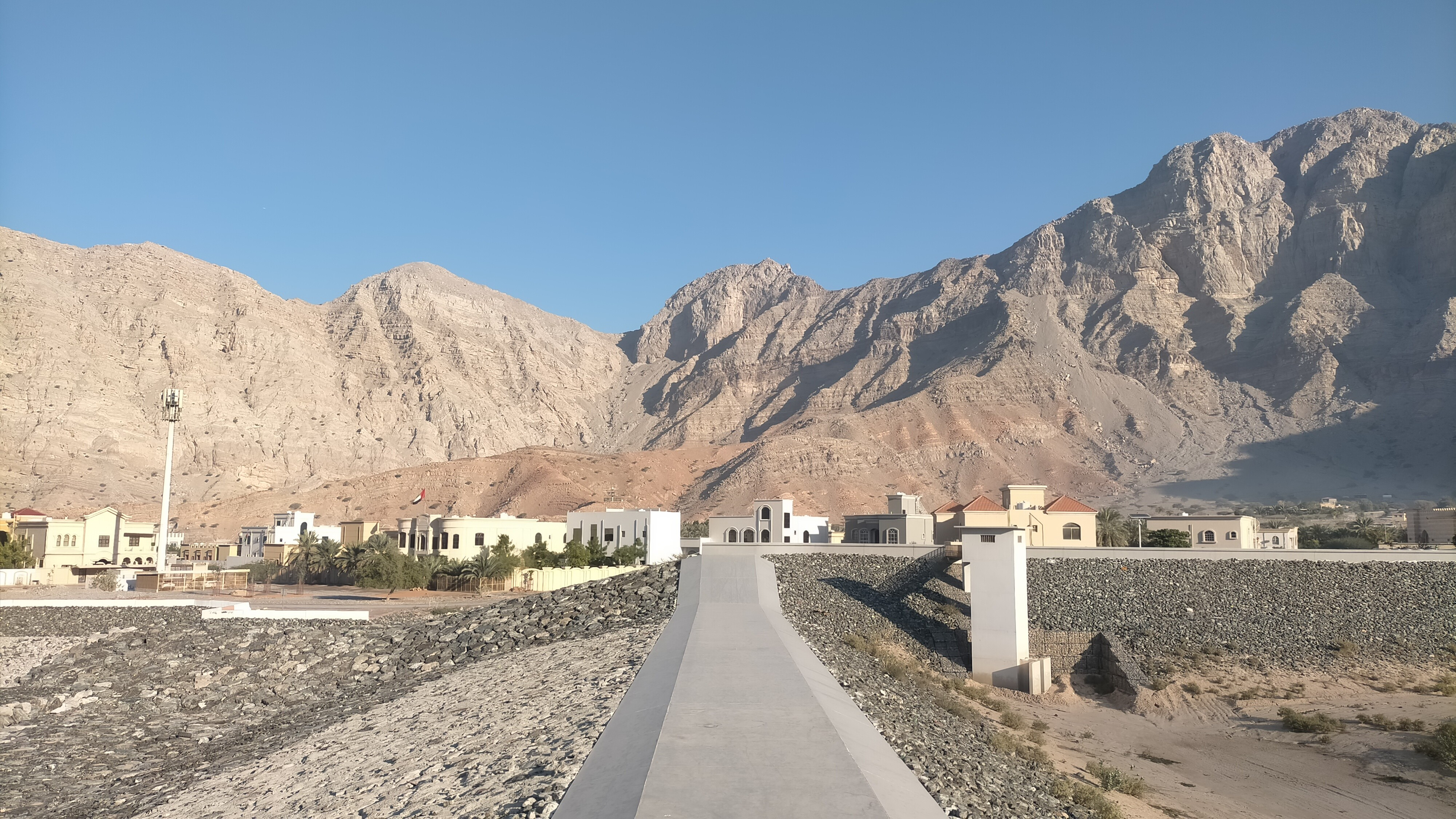
Wadi Sha'am Dam

Like other regions of the UAE, the Wadi Sha'am area has occasionally been affected by unusually heavy rainfall and flooding.

To prevent the danger of flash floods and increase the recharge potential of groundwater, an 8 m (26 ft) high dam was built across its channel in 2001, holding a reservoir of 0.035 km^{2} (0.014 mi^{2}) and a capacity of 0.25 million cubic meters.

It was officially named Wadi Sha'am Dam (coordinates: 26°01′59″N, 56°06′54″E).

== Toponymy ==
Alternative names: Wādī ash Sha‘m, Wādī Sha‘am, Wadi Sha'am, Wadi Sha'm, Wadi Shaam.

The name of Wadi Sha'am (with the spellings Wadi Sha'am and Wādī ash Sha‘m), its tributaries, mountains and nearby towns, was recorded in the documentation and maps produced between 1950 and 1960 by the British Arabist, cartographer, military officer and diplomat Julian F. Walker, during the work carried out to establish the borders between the then called Trucial States, later completed by the UK Ministry of Defence, with 1:100 000 scale maps published from 1971.

In the National Atlas of the United Arab Emirates it appears with the spelling Wādī Sha‘am (Arabic: وادي شعم).

== Population ==
The Wadi Sha'am area was mainly populated by the Shihuh tribe, Bani Shatair section, Bani tribal area Juma. According to the 2023 RAK Census, the area has a population of 2,539.

== See also ==
- List of wadis of the United Arab Emirates
- List of mountains in the United Arab Emirates
- List of wadis of Oman
- List of mountains in Oman
