= Wadi Atmar =

Wadi in UAE

Wadi Atmar Wādī Atmār
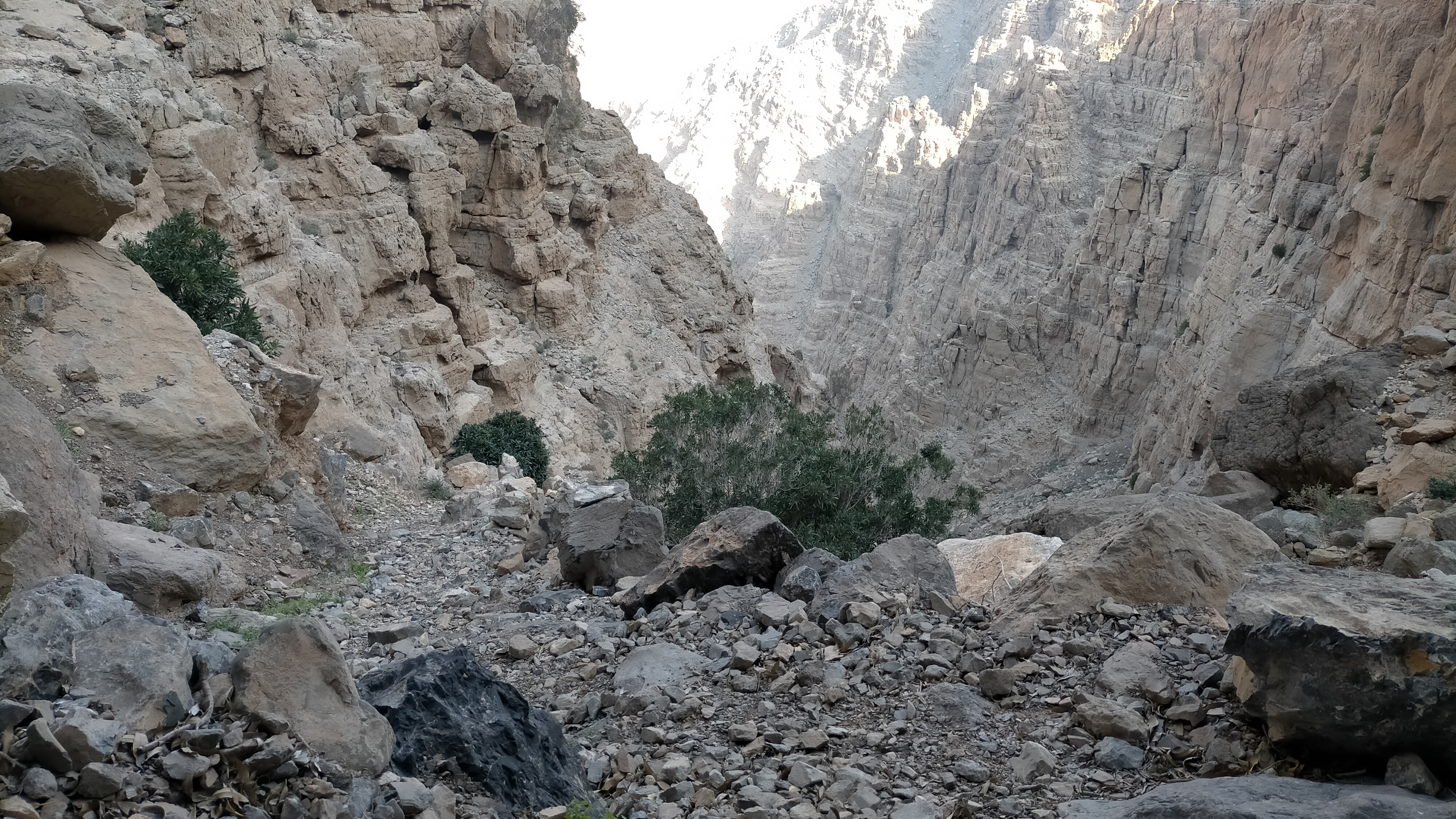
- Wadi Atmar. Rocky and steep riverbed

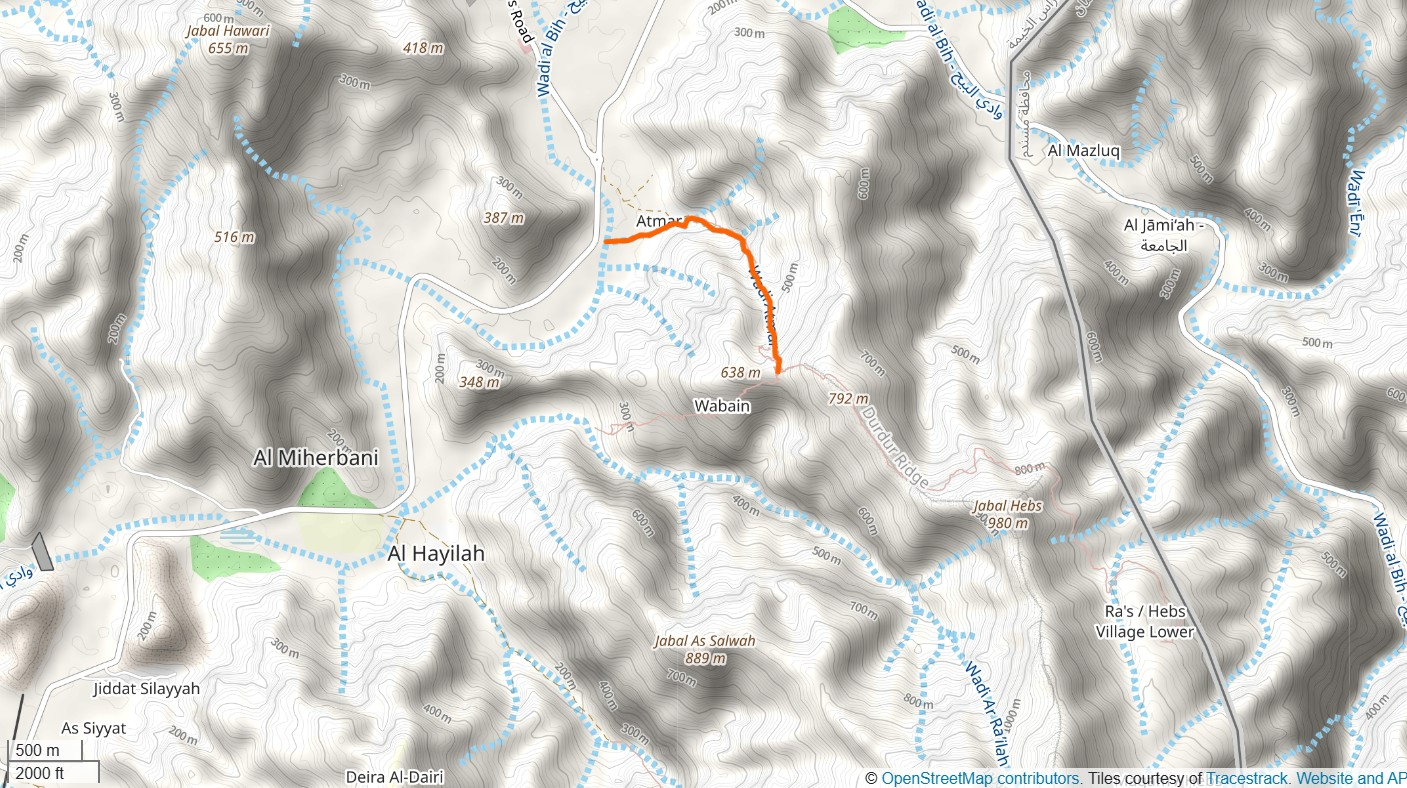
- Location and course of Wadi Atmar

- Location within United Arab Emirates Location within Persian Gulf Location within West and Central Asia
- Native name: وادي عتمار (Arabic)

Location
- Country: United Arab Emirates
- Emirate: Ras Al Khaimah

Physical characteristics
- Source: Northern slope of the Atmar Col (626 m), located at the northwestern end of the Durdur Ridge
  - elevation: 620 m (2,030 ft), approximately
- Mouth: In the Wadi Bih, next the village of Atmar
  - coordinates: 25°48′59″N 56°06′49″E
  - elevation: 156 m (512 ft)
- Length: 1.93 km (1.20 mi)
- Basin size: 1.3 km^{2} (0.50 mi^{2}) (subbasin)

Basin features
- Progression: Wadi. Intermittent flow
- River system: Wadi Bih

Wadi Atmar (Arabic: وادي عتمار, romanized: Wādī Atmār) is a short stream, valley, or dry river with ephemeral or intermittent flow, which flows almost exclusively during the rainy season, located in the emirate of Ras Al Khaimah, in the northeast of the United Arab Emirates.

It is part of the Wadi Bih drainage basin (483 km^{2} (186 mi^{2})), and is a left tributary within a small hydrographic subbasin of only 1.3 km^{2} (0.50 mi^{2}).

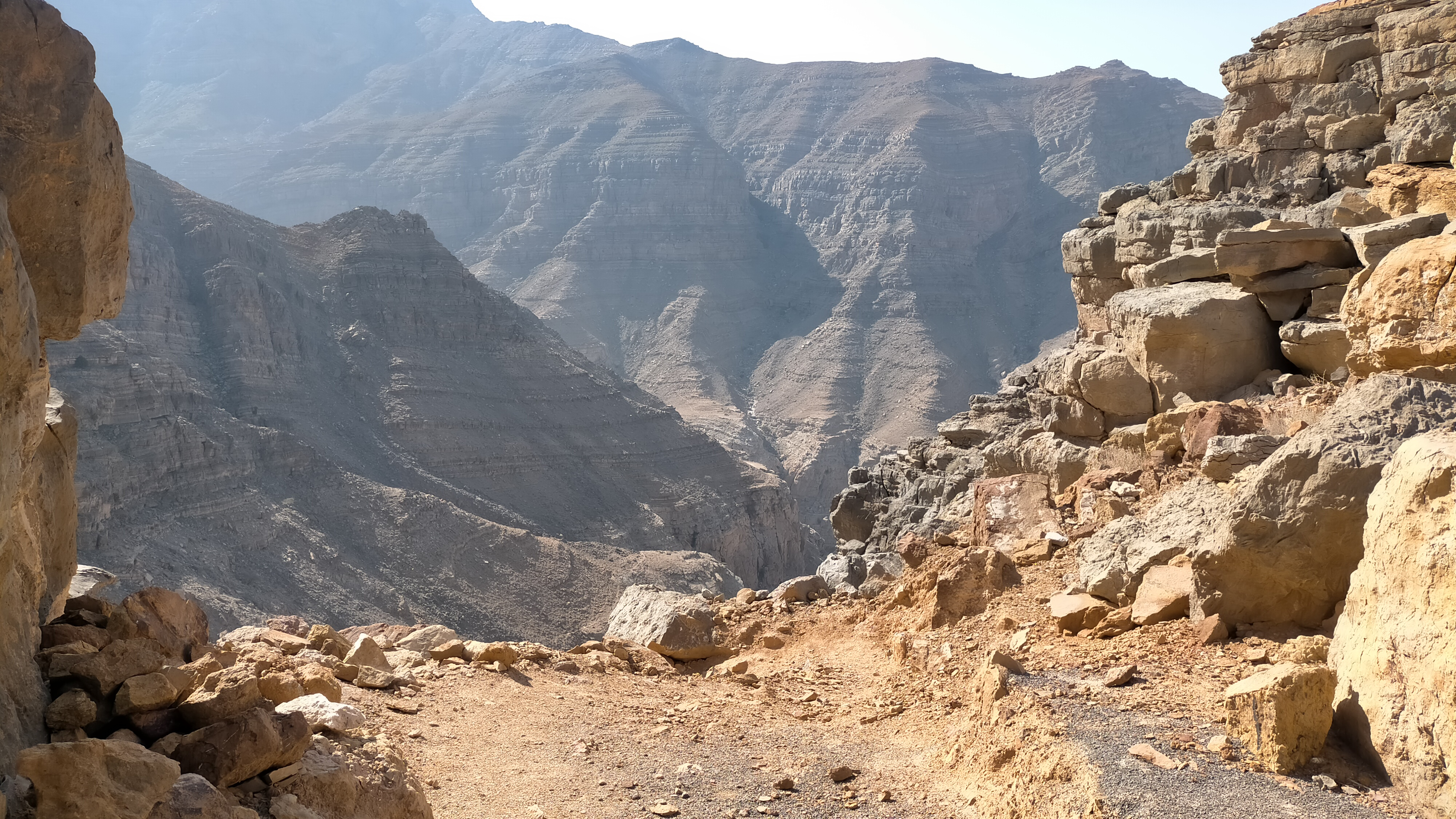
Atmar Col. View towards the southern slope of the pass

The main channel of Wadi Atmar originates on the northern slope of Atmar Pass (Atmar Col, 626 m (2,054 ft)), at the northwestern end of the Durdur Ridge, in the mountain pass connecting the sub-basins of Wadi Atmar and the adjacent Wadi Ar Ra'ilah. On maps published in 1971 by the Ministry of Defence of the United Kingdom, the latter was indicated as Wadi Hiyaila.

== Course ==
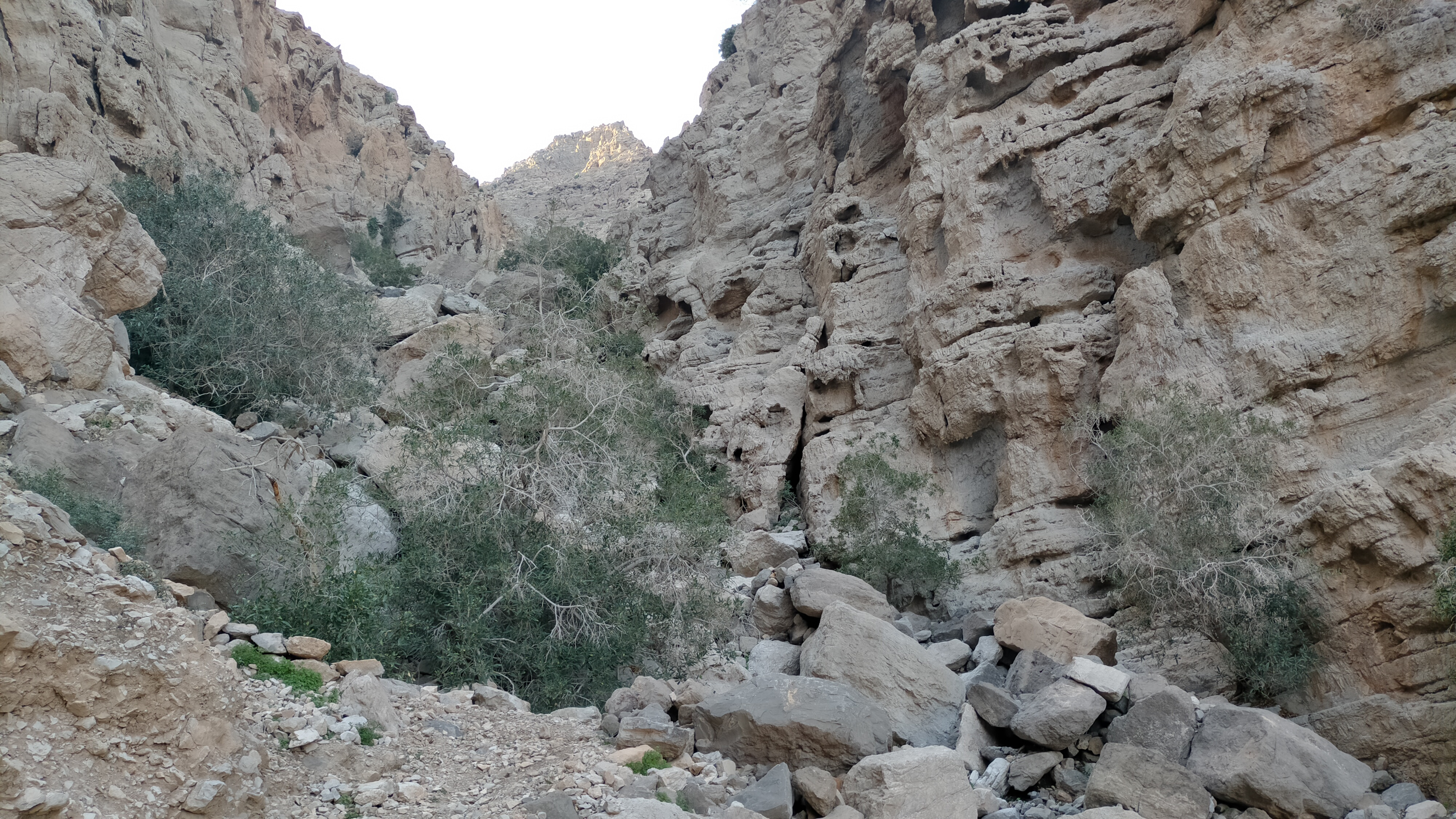
Wadi Atmar. Steep and rocky channel

Wadi Atmar is just under 2 km (1.2 mi) long and has no major tributaries. Flowing from south to north, its upper course is rocky and steep, with some sections having an average gradient of over 35%.

In its lower course, the wadi's gradient becomes very gentle, and it flows in a semi-channeled form for the final meters before its mouth in Wadi Bih, bordering the village of Atmar to the south.

In recent years, the narrow donkey trail along the wadi's channel to Atmar Pass has been fully renovated. Today, despite the steep gradient, this trail is the main access route on foot or with donkeys to the mountain villages of Ra's and Magam (also known as the Hebs villages) on the eastern slopes of Jabal Hebs / Jabal Hibs (980 m (3,220 ft)). This area was an important ancient settlement of the Habus tribe (singular: Al Habsi or Hebsi).

== Toponymy ==
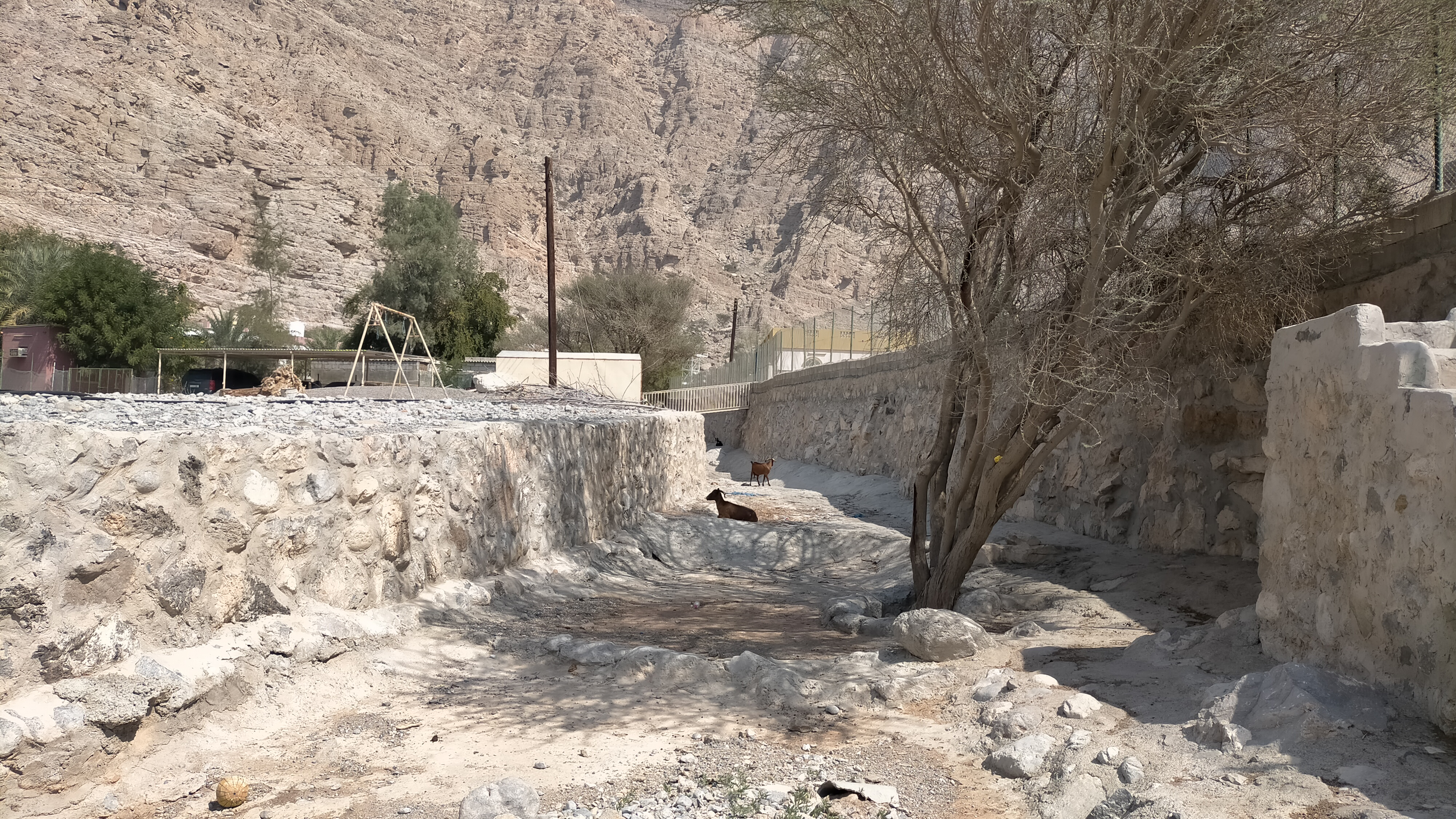
Wadi Atmar channeled as it passes through the village of Atmar

Alternative names: Wādī Atmār.

The name of this wadi does not appear in the documentation and maps created between 1950 and 1960 by the British Arabist, cartographer, military officer, and diplomat Julian F. Walker, nor in other documents concerning the establishment of borders between the former Trucial States.

However, the 1993 National Atlas of the United Arab Emirates does identify the village of Atmar, for which the wadi is named.

== Population ==
The area around Wadi Atmar was mainly populated by the Habus tribe and was part of the Banī Sa'ad tribal area.

== See also ==
- List of wadis of the United Arab Emirates
- List of mountains in the United Arab Emirates
- List of wadis of Oman
- List of mountains in Oman
