= Wadi Naqat =

Wadi in the UAE

Wadi Naqat Wādī Nqāṭ
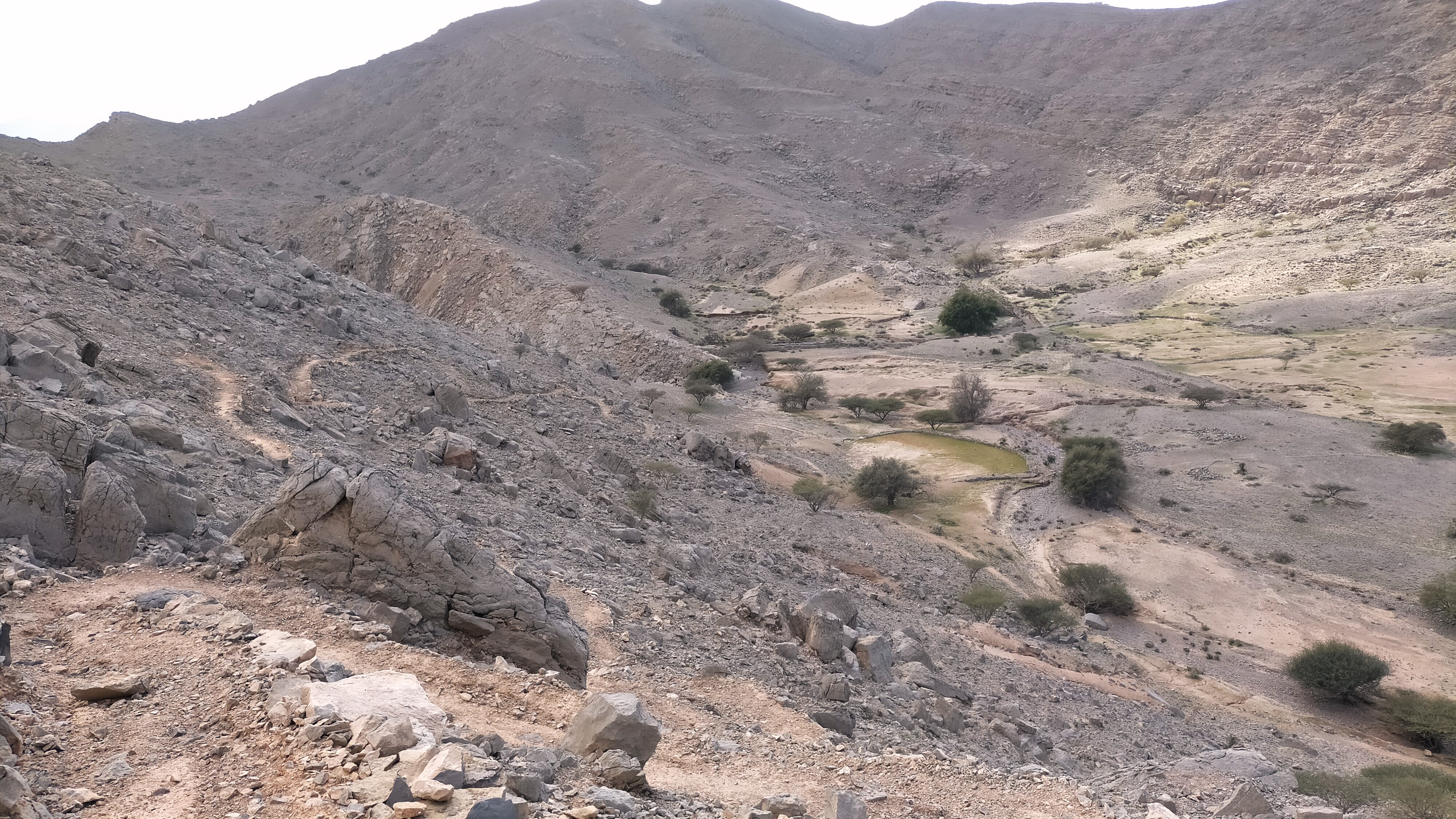
- Wadi Naqat - Small wadi, tributary of Wadi Shah - Near the city of Rams, Ras Al Khaimah (UAE)

- Location within United Arab Emirates Location within Persian Gulf Location within Middle East Location within West and Central Asia
- Native name: وادي نقاط (Arabic)

Location
- Country: United Arab Emirates
- Emirate: Ras Al Khaimah

Physical characteristics
- Source: Western slope of the southern end of the Jabal Ar Rahrah Ridge, from the Jabal Naqat (900 m). Hajar Mountains
  - elevation: 510 m (1,670 ft)
- Mouth: Wadi Shah
  - coordinates: 25°51′53″N 56°05′54″E
  - elevation: 220 m (720 ft)
- Length: 4 km (2.5 mi)
- Basin size: Wadi Bih: 483 km^{2} (186 mi^{2}); Subbasin Wadi Shah: 72.06 km^{2} (27.82 mi^{2})

Basin features
- River system: Wadi Bih (Subbasin Wadi Shah)

Wadi Naqat (Arabic: وادي نقاط, romanized: Wādī Nqāṭ) is a valley or dry river, with intermittent flow, flowing almost exclusively during the rainy season, belonging to the river basin of the Wadi Bih, (subbasin of the Wadi Shah), northeast of the United Arab Emirates, in the Emirate of Ras Al Khaimah.

It is a right tributary of Wadi Shah, and is formed mainly by the ravines and gullies that run across the western slopes of the southern end of the Jabal Ar Rahrah Ridge, from Jabal Naqat (900 m)

== Course ==
The Wadi Naqat runs mainly from north to south, parallel to the Jabal Ar Rahrah Ridge, and a short distance from the last of the most prominent peaks of this mountain ridge: the Jabal Naqat (900 m), but in the final kilometer of its course it turns to the east, crossing the southern end of the ridge, to finally end at the Wadi Shah.

Although the Wadi Naqat has small decline for most of its length, in the last kilometer it plunges towards its mouth with a slope of 25%, and a drop of 250 metres.

There are no settlements along the wadi, except for the old village of Ruwais, in the growing area known as Sal Dayah / Sall Dhaya, located to the north of the wide and fertile valley formed by Wadi Naqat itself and Wadi Sall, sheltered from the breezes of the Persian Gulf by the small mountain range crowned by the Jabal Rams (761 m), which separates this valley from the city of Rams and its neighbor Dhayah Fort.

== Toponymy ==
Alternative Names: Wadi Naqat, Wādī Naqat

The names of Wadi Naqat, Jabal Naqat, Wadi Sall, and the village of Ruwais were recorded in documentation and maps produced between 1950 and 1960 by the British Arabist, cartographer, military officer, and diplomat Julian F. Walker, during the work carried out for the establishment of borders between the then called Trucial States, later completed by the Ministry of Defense (United Kingdom), on 1:100,000 scale maps published in 1971.

In the political and administrative organization of the Emirate of Ras Al Khaimah, the name of the main wadi is frequently used as an identifying element of the entire territory covered by its drainage basin.

In the case of Wadi Shehah or Wadi Shah, this drainage sub-basin is very large (72.06 km^{2}), comprising numerous towns, villages and farms widely scattered throughout its valleys and mountains. Naturally, it also includes all the ravines and tributaries of the main wadi.

The same denomination is also used for postal purposes.

For this reason, the mistake of considering that this is the only name that corresponds to all the different wadis, and even to some population centers in this region, is widespread, frequently ignoring the true name of each of these places.

This has contributed to the fact that Wadi Naqat has been incorrectly referred to as Wadi Shehah or Wadi Shah on a few occasions, although in this case, due to its proximity to Wadi Haqil, it is often confused with the latter as well.

== Population ==
The geographical area of Wadi Naqat, like the area corresponding to Wadi Sall and Wadi Haqil, known for abundant rainfall and freshwater wells, as well as its rich cultural heritage, was historically populated by the small semi-nomadic tribe Bani Shumayli (Bani Shimaili), which was not considered Shihuh, and which had its main population center in the village of Shimal and in the Wadi Haqil / Wadi Haqeel area.

== Gallery ==
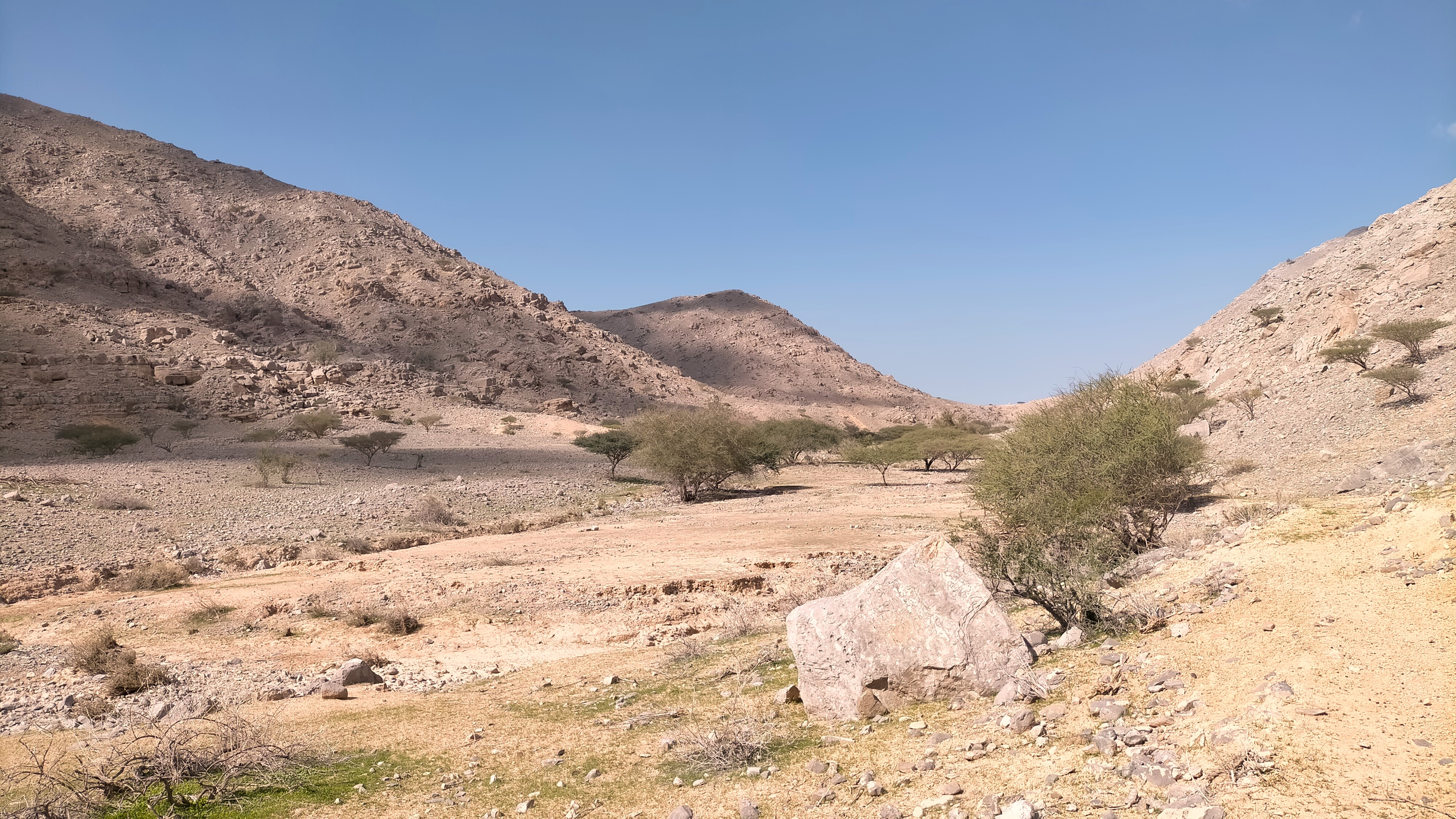
Wadi Naqat. Little slope in most of its course

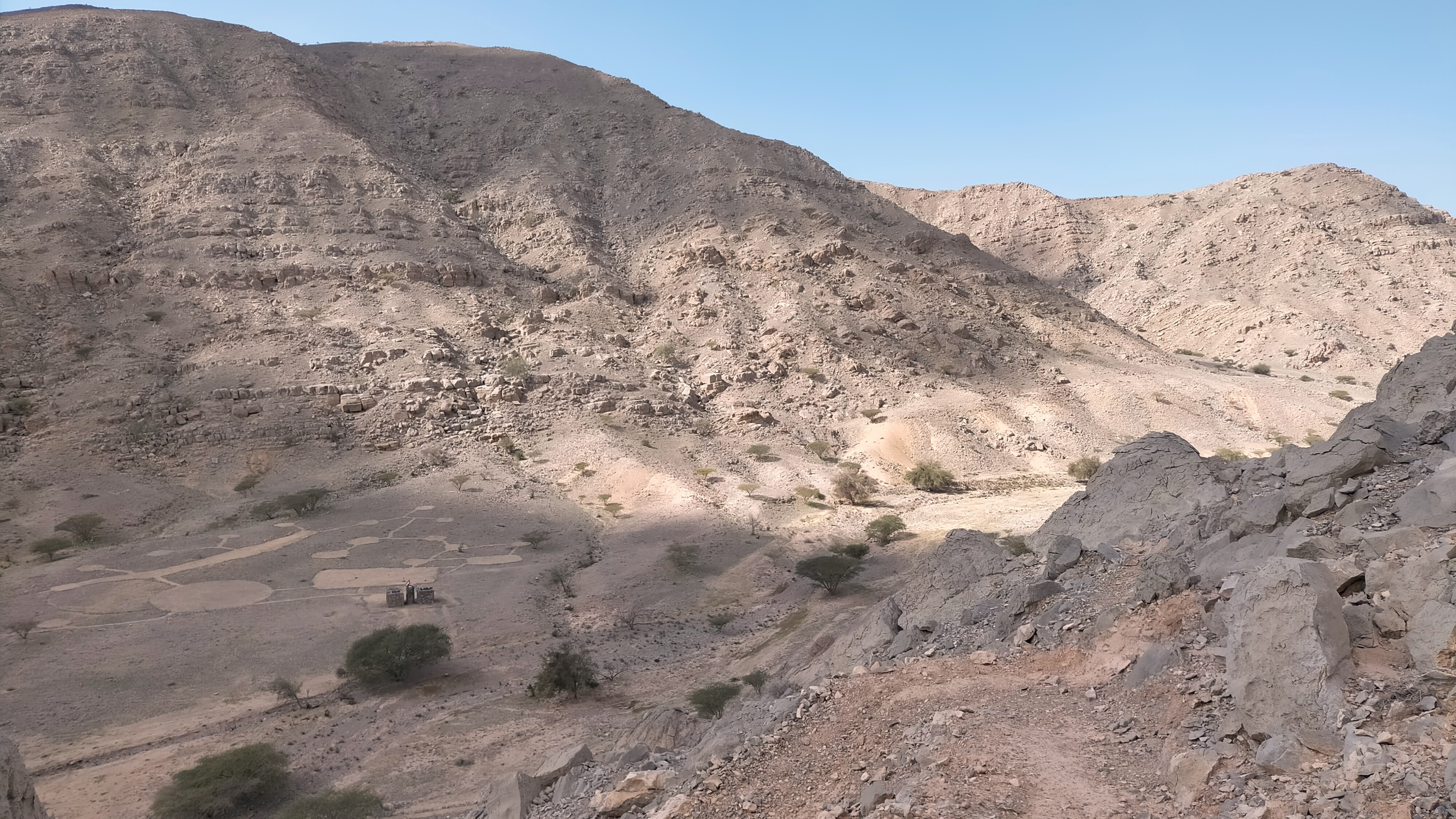
Wadi Naqat. Middle course

== See also ==
- List of wadis of the United Arab Emirates
- List of mountains in the United Arab Emirates
- List of wadis of Oman
- List of mountains in Oman
