= Wadi Al Munay =

Wadi in UAE

Wadi Al Munay Wādī Al Minе̄‘ī
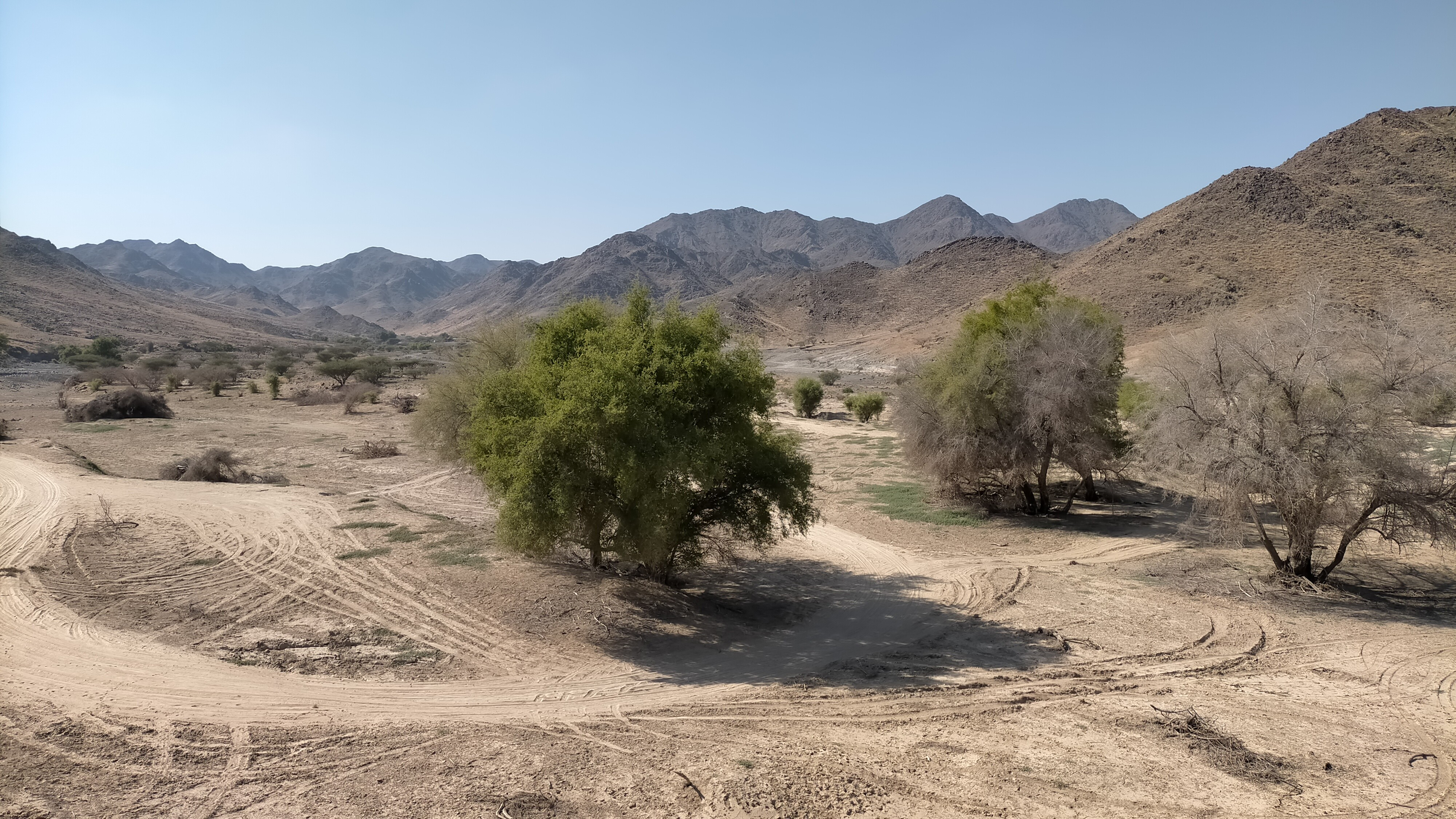

- Location within United Arab Emirates Location within Persian Gulf Location within West and Central Asia
- Native name: وادي المنيعي (Arabic)

Location
- Country: United Arab Emirates
- Emirate: Ras al-Khaimah

Physical characteristics
- Source: At the northwestern end of the Wadi Al Qor watershed.
  - elevation: 748 m (2,454 ft), approximately
- Mouth: Confluence with the Wadi Al Qor at Bida' Majed, near the village of Al Fashqah.
  - coordinates: 24°52′56″N 56°12′34″E
  - elevation: 157 m (515 ft)
- Length: 27 km (17 mi)
- Basin size: 303 km^{2} (117 mi^{2}) (Wadi Al Qor basin).

Basin features
- Progression: Wadi. Intermittent flow
- River system: Wadi Al Qor
- Tributaries
  - left: Wadi Bu Harman, Wadi Al Luss
  - right: Wadi Tuwa, Wadi Al Rabka

Wadi Al Munay (Arabic: وادي المنيعي), romanized: Wādī Al Minе̄‘ī) is a valley or dry river, with ephemeral or intermittent flow, which flows almost exclusively during the rainy season, located in the emirate of Ras al Khaimah, in the east of the United Arab Emirates.

It is the main tributary of the Wadi Al Qor, to whose 303 km^{2} (117 mi^{2}) drainage basin it belongs.

== Course ==
The total approximate length of Wadi Al Munay is 27 km (17 mi).

It flows from northwest to southeast, and its main source is located at an altitude of approximately 748 m (2,454 ft), at the northwestern end of the drainage divide of the Wadi Al Qor, on the eastern slope of the mountain ridge that marks the drainage divide between the basins that drain into the Gulf of Oman, and those that drain into the Persian Gulf and inland floodplains.

For approximately 12 km (7.5 mi) (from the end of its upper course to past the village of Al Munay), the E102 Sharjah - Kalba Road closely follows the wadi's channel, crossing it at several points.

Wadi Al Munay has a steeper gradient and faster underground flow than Wadi Al Qor, but apart from its headwaters, which have a steep slope typical of mountain ravines, the middle and lower reaches of the wadi have a relatively moderate gradient.

Along its course, Wadi Al Munay passes, among other towns and villages, Al Munay (Sha'biyyat Al Minē'ī), Al Waab (Arabic: شعبية الوعب, romanized: Sha'biyyat Al Wa'ab) and Sikhebar (Arabic: شعبية صخيبر), romanized: Sha'biyyat Sikhе̄bar), flanked on both banks by a multitude of small, widely scattered farms and agricultural holdings.

In the past, these villages had forts or watchtowers for protection and maintenance, and had a prosperous agricultural economy, based mainly on the cultivation and sale of tobacco, and the production of dates, mangoes, oranges, limes, and other fruits, as well as the cultivation of cereals.

The Wadi Al Munay merges and flows into the Wadi Al Qor in the area of Bida' Majed, approximately one kilometer from the town of Al Fashqah / Fashrah.

== Dams and Reservoirs ==
Like most wadis in the United Arab Emirates and Oman, Wadi Al Munay is prone to severe flooding.

To prevent the risk of flash floods and increase the recharge potential of groundwater, four small dams were built in 2002 on some of the tributaries of Wadi Al Munay:

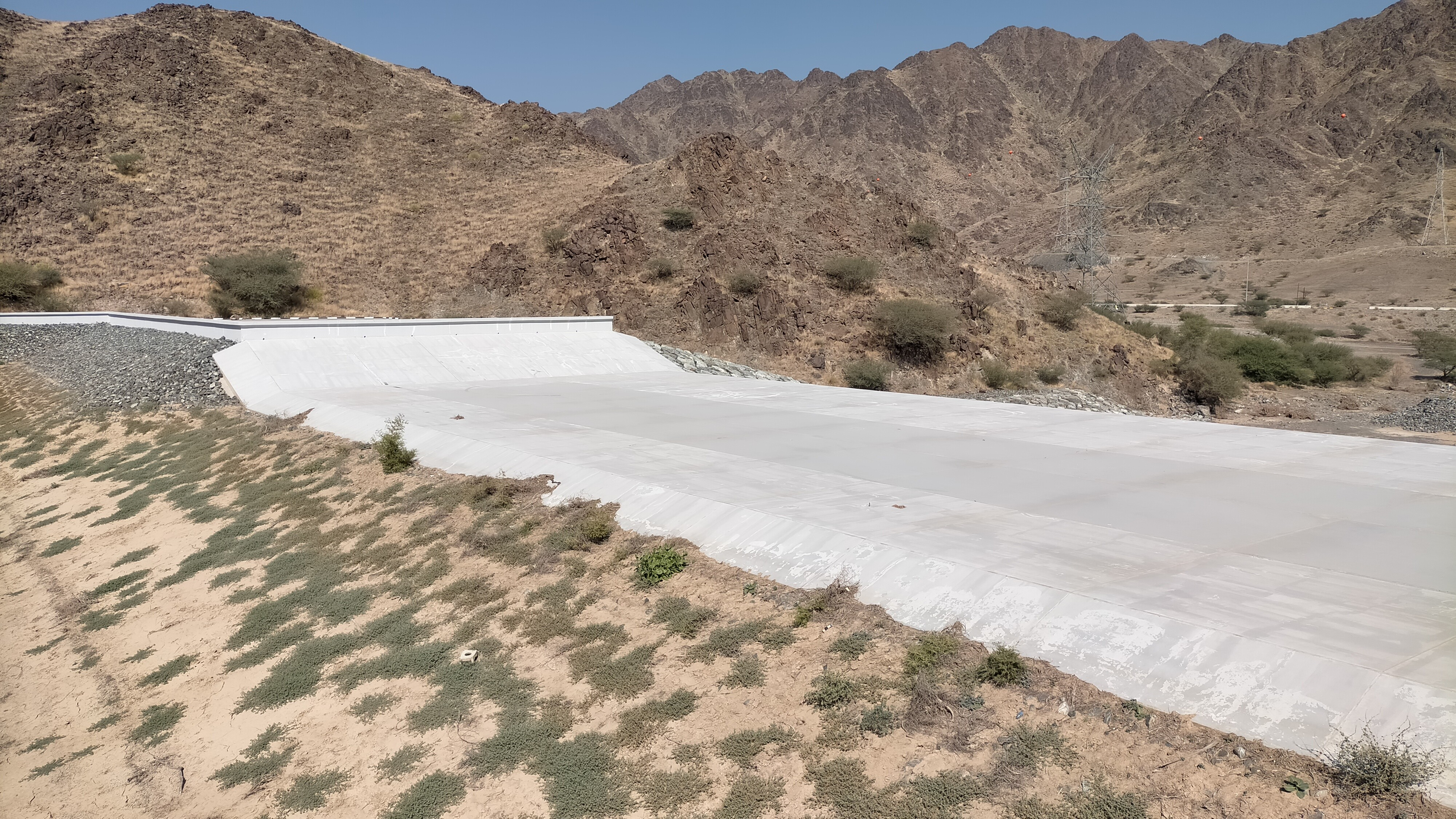
Al Munai Breaker - Dam built on the Wadi Bu Harman, a small tributary of the Wadi Al Munay

- On one branch or tributary, called Wadi Bu Harman in the National Atlas, an 8.5 m (28 ft)-high dam was built, with a reservoir of 0.08 km^{2} (0.031 mi^{2}) and a capacity of 0.05 million cubic meters (coordinates: 24°59′45″N, 56°06′51″E). The dam is located a few meters before the confluence of this tributary with the main wadi, very close to the village of Al Munay, and was named Al Munai Breaker.
- In Wadi Tuwa / Wadi Tawah, another dam of 8.4 m (28 ft) height was built, with a reservoir of 0.1584 km^{2} (0.0612 mi^{2}) and a capacity of 0.49 million cubic meters, called the Wadi Tuwa Dam (coordinates: 25°1′15″N, 56°7′34″E).
- In the Wadi Al Luss, a third dam, 8.7 m (29 ft) high, with a reservoir of 0.045 km^{2} (0.017 mi^{2}) and a capacity of 0.05 million cubic meters, called the Wadi Al Luss Dam (coordinates: 24°58′20″N, 56°07′44″E).
- And finally, in the Wadi Al Rabka, another 8.8 m (29 ft) high, with a reservoir of 0.182 km^{2} (0.070 mi^{2}) and a capacity of 0.542 million cubic meters, called Wadi Al Rabka Dam (coordinates: 24°57′43″N, 56°09′57″E).

== Toponymy ==
Alternative names: Wadi Munay`i, Wādī Munay‘ī, Wadi Munai, Wadi Manai, Wādī Al Minе̄‘ī, Wadi Al Munai, Wadi Munay, Wādī al-Munaīʿī, Wadi al-Munai'i, Al Munai'e.

The name of Wadi Al Munay (spelled Wādī Munay‘ī), its tributaries, mountains and nearby towns was recorded in the documentation and maps produced between 1950 and 1960 by the British Arabist, cartographer, military officer and diplomat Julian F. Walker, during the work carried out to establish the borders between the then so-called Trucial States. This work was later completed by the Ministry of Defence of the United Kingdom, with 1:100,000 scale maps published in 1971.

In the National Atlas of the United Arab Emirates it appears as Wādī Al Minе̄‘ī (Arabic: وادي المنيعي).

== Population ==
The entire area around Wadi Al Munay was occupied mainly by the Dahaminah tribal area, as well as Bani Kaab, Maharzah, and Quwayd / Quwayyid.

== See also ==
- List of wadis of the United Arab Emirates
- List of mountains in the United Arab Emirates
- List of wadis of Oman
- List of mountains in Oman
