= Wadi Esfai =

- Location within United Arab Emirates
- Coordinates: 25°06′19″N 56°07′52″E
- Country: United Arab Emirates
- Emirate: Ras Al Khaimah
- Elevation: 401 m (1,316 ft)

Wadi Esfai is a seasonal watercourse in the Hajar Mountains of Ras Al Khaimah, United Arab Emirates. It runs from the village of Sifuni on the Mleiha to Fujairah highway (E84) to join Wadi Shawkah south of the village of Esfai.

Wadi Esfai receives high levels of winter rainfall, sufficient to trigger flash floods powerful enough to wash away the road traversing the wadi and will also receive rainfall in the summer months.

Traditionally home to members of the Mazari tribe, the wadi Esfai is notable particularly for the discovery of a new species of moth from the genus Meharia: Meharia breithaupti. The Meharia moth was known to inhabit arid regions, and the related Meharia philbyi has been found in Saudi Arabia, Yemen and Oman. Meharia philbyi was named for the Arabist and explorer Harry St John Philby in 1952. The new moth was named for its discoverer, German entomologist Roland Breithaupt.

A 1937 survey of wadis in Southeastern Arabia undertaken by the British Air Ministry found Wadi Esfai to be a 'valley of small villages of Mazari, acknowledging the Sheikh of Sharjah'.

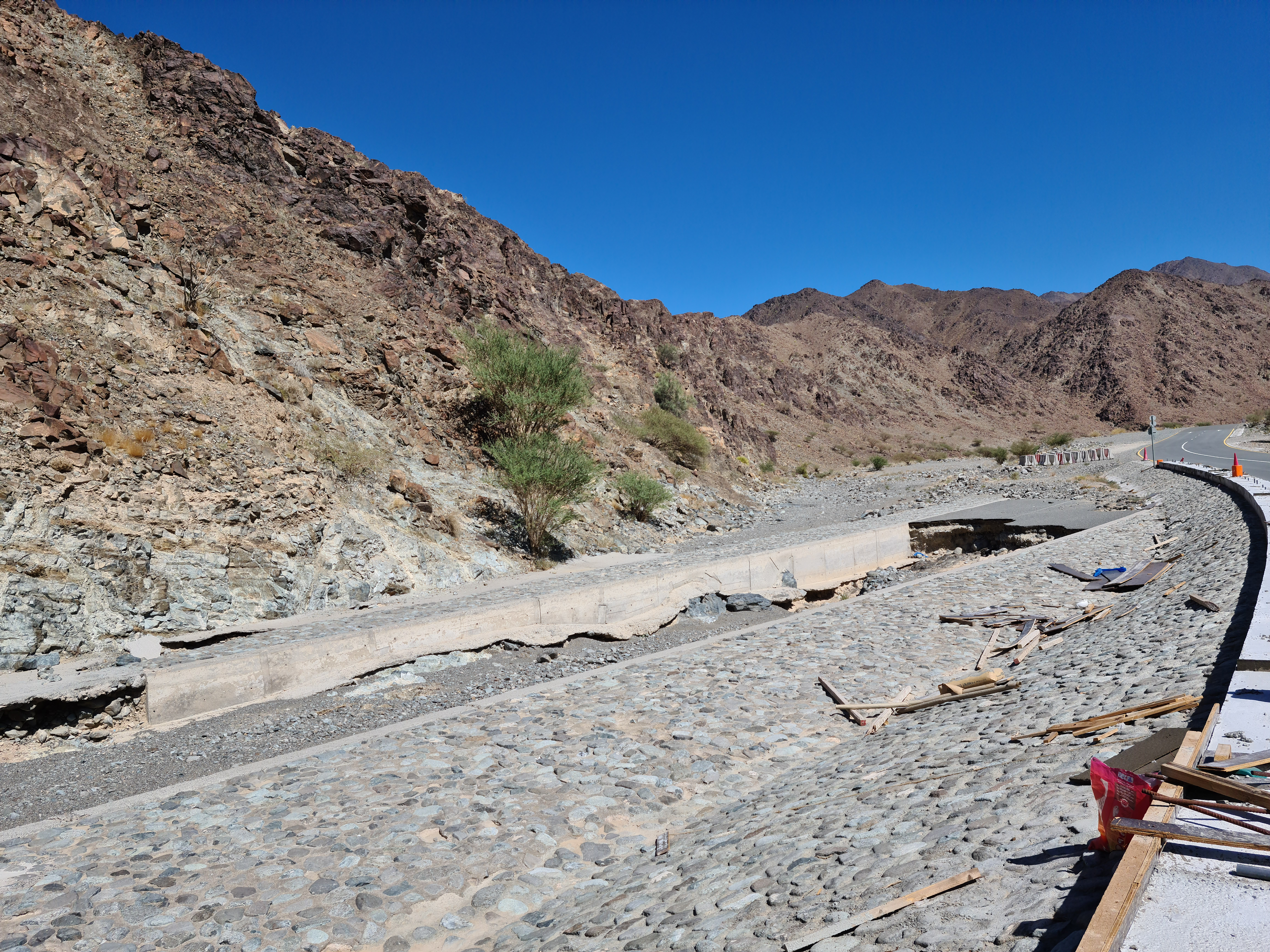
The road to the village of Esfai – washed away by the seasonal flooding of the Wadi Esfai.

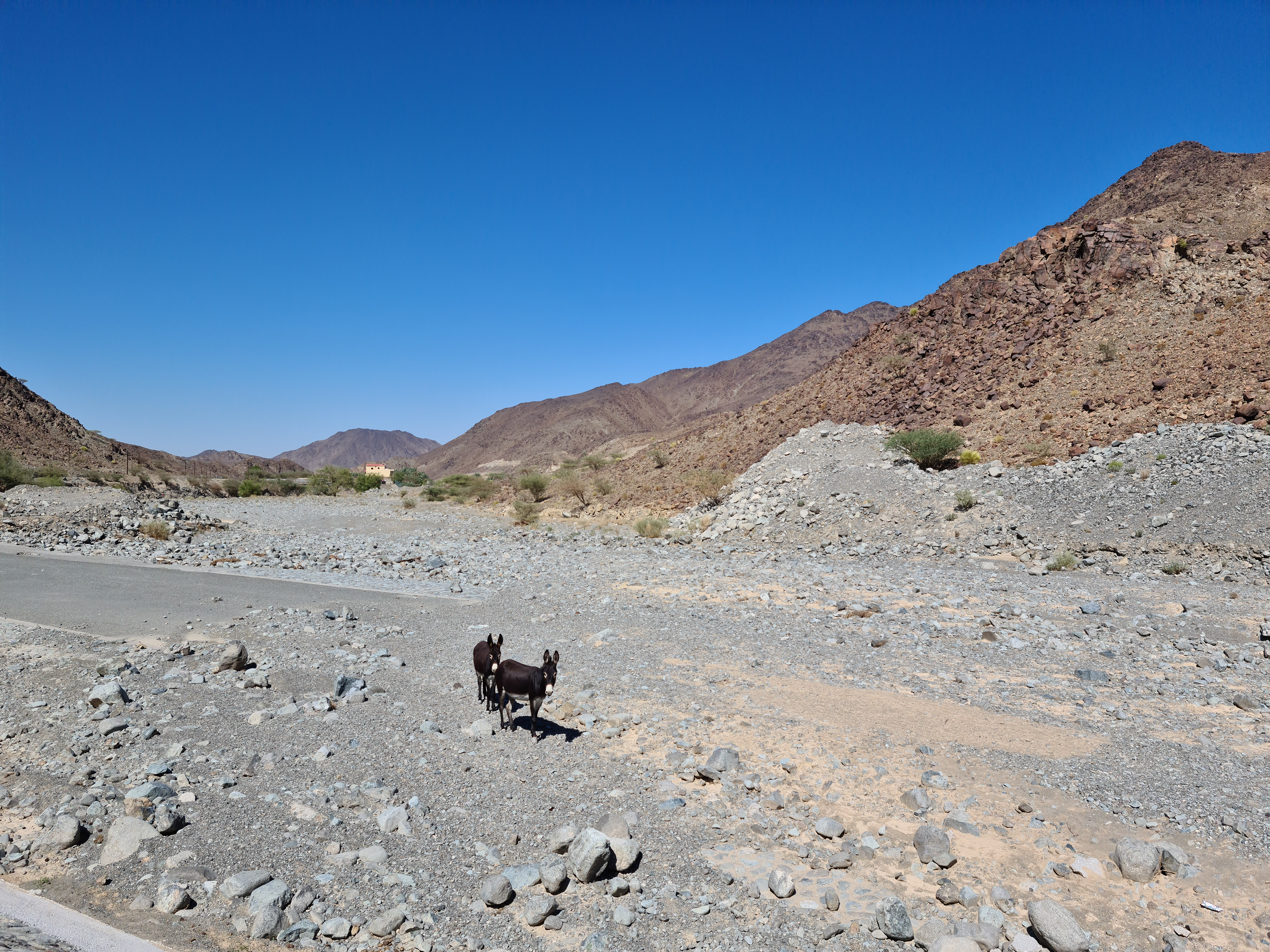
Wild donkeys roaming the Wadi Esfai

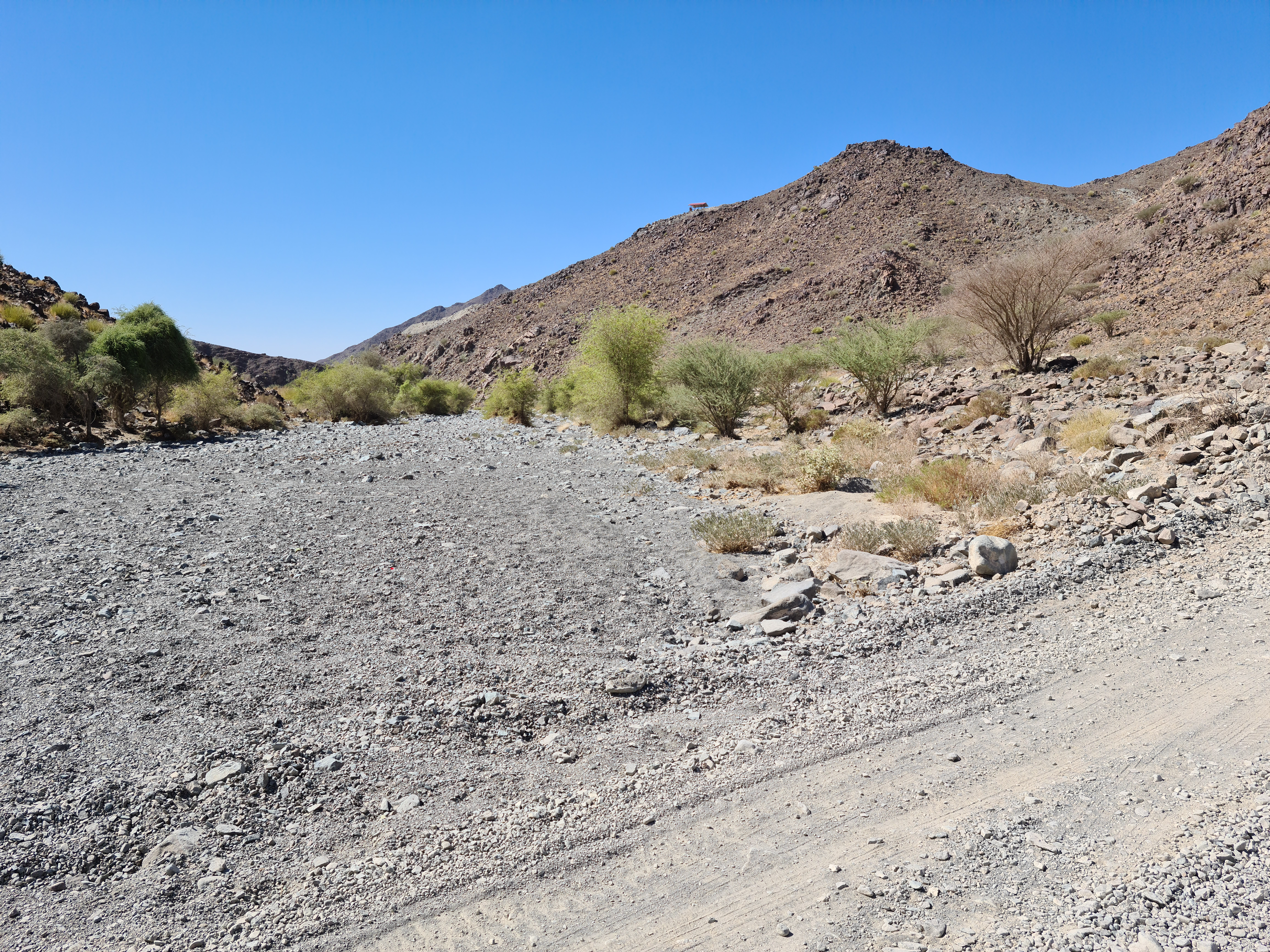
The confluence of the Wadi Esfai with the Wadi Shawka

== See also ==
- List of wadis of the United Arab Emirates
