= Wadi Awsaq =

Wadi in UAE

Wadi Awsaq Wādī Awsāq
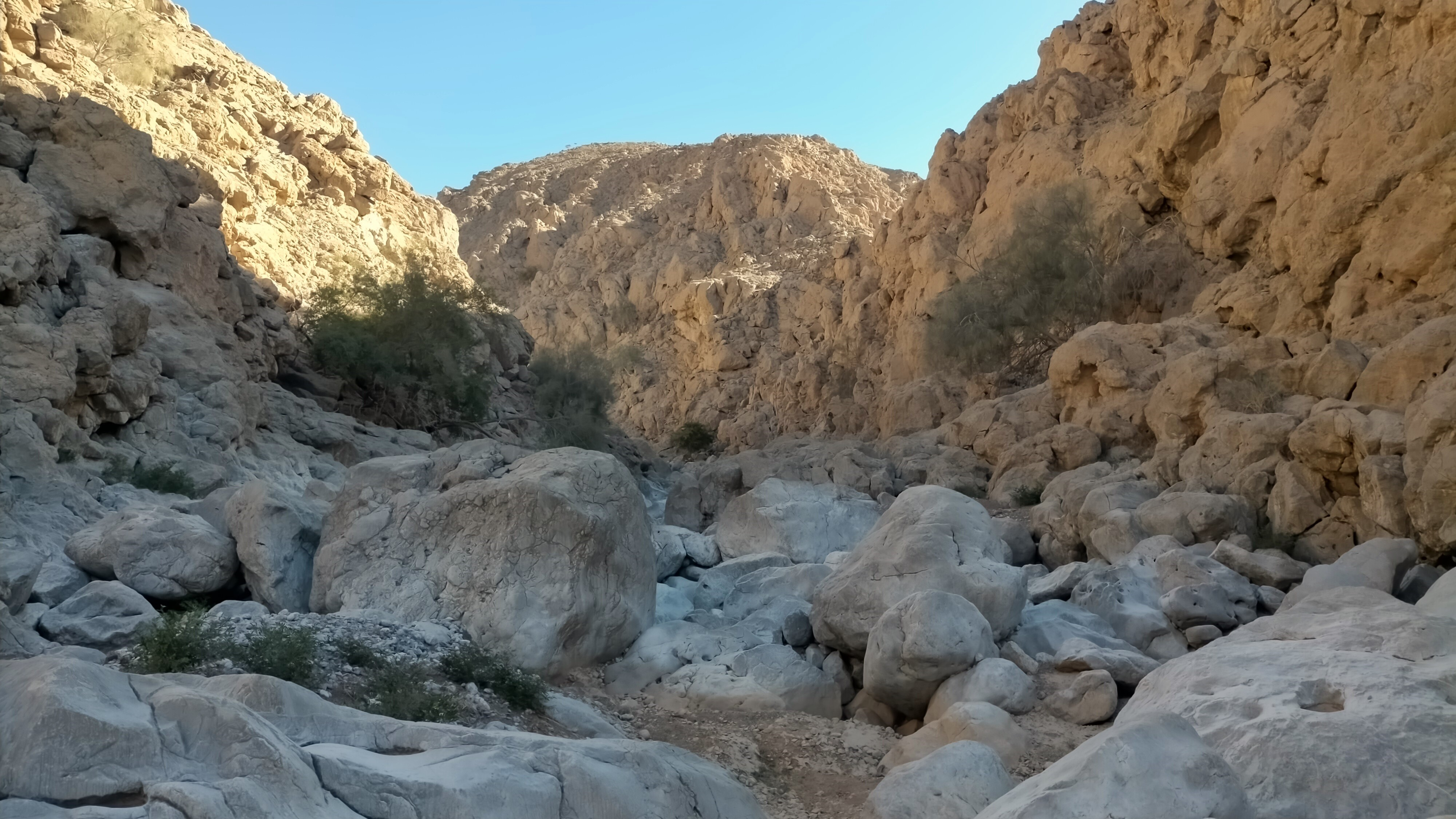

- Location within United Arab Emirates Location within Persian Gulf Location within West and Central Asia
- Native name: وادي أوسق (Arabic)

Location
- Country: United Arab Emirates
- Emirate: Fujairah; Ras Al Khaimah

Physical characteristics
- Source: On the northern slope of Jabal Yibir, near the village of Dardur.
  - elevation: 1,440 m (4,720 ft), approximately
- Mouth: In the Wadi Tawiyean.
  - coordinates: 25°34′01″N 56°03′34″E
  - elevation: 145 m (476 ft)
- Length: 18.8 km (11.7 mi)
- Basin size: 208 km^{2} (80 mi^{2})

Basin features
- Progression: Wadi. Intermittent flow
- River system: Wadi Tawiyean.
- Tributaries
  - left: Wadi Mara (upper segment of the main wadi), Wadi Al Mayyah
  - right: Wadi Sadakh

Wadi Awsaq (Arabic: وادي أوسق, romanized: Wādī Awsāq) is a valley or dry river, with ephemeral or intermittent flow, which flows almost exclusively during the rainy season, located in the east of the United Arab Emirates, in the emirates of Fujairah and Ras Al Khaimah.

It is a right tributary of the Wadi Tawiyean, to whose extensive drainage basin of 208 km² it belongs, and which borders to the north with the basins of the Wadi Khabb Shamsi, Wadi Naqab and Wadi Nahela; and to the south and west by those of Wadi Mu'taridah / Wadi Mutarid and Wadi Basseirah.

The entire Wadi Tawiyean basin, whose highest peak is Jabal Yibir (1,527 m (5,010 ft)), brings together approximately 222 independent streams, most of them unnamed, all classified into five grades or levels according to the Horton-Strahler numbering.

Among the main tributaries of the Wadi Awsaq (sub-tributaries of the Wadi Tawiyean), the Wadi Mara (upper segment of the main wadi), the Wadi Al Mayyah and the Wadi Sadakh stand out.

== Course ==
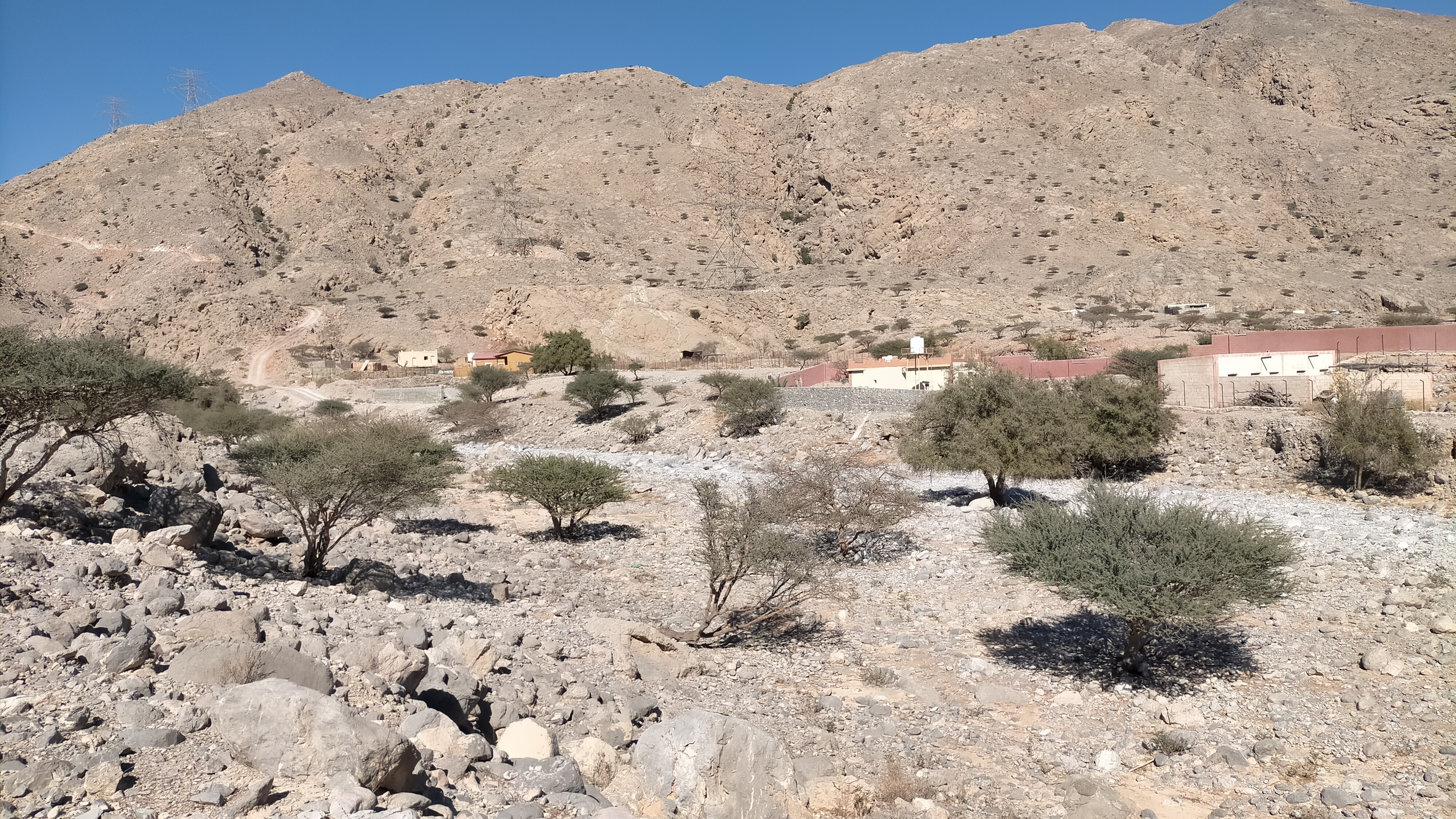
Confluence of the Wadi Al Mayyah into the Wadi Awsaq, near the village of Mayya / Al-Mayah

The total approximate length of the Wadi Awsaq is 18.8 km (11.7 mi) (including the upper segment, also known as Wadi Mara (Arabic: وادي مرا).

It flows from north to south, and its main source is located on the northern slope of Jabal Yibir, at an altitude of approximately 1,440 m (4,720 ft) above sea level.

In its upper course it borders first to the south the Jabal Dardur (1,398 m (4,587 ft)), and the village of Dardur (Arabic: ديرة الدردور), which extends around its summit, forming a ravine that descends to the nearby village of Al Marah (Arabic: المرح).

In Al Marah the wadi turns south until it reaches the village of Mayya / Al-Mayah (Arabic: قَرْيَة ٱلْمِيَة), where it receives on its left its tributary the Wadi Al Mayyah (Arabic: وادي الميه).

Mayya is currently a small village, located next to the access road to the summit of Jabal Yibir, with few permanent inhabitants, as most of its residents moved in 1973 to a residential neighborhood near the city of Tawiyean (Arabic: الطويين, romanized: Aţ Ţawyēn), but tradition speaks of the existence at this site of a large natural pond 10 m (33 ft) deep, with three springs that provided a year-round supply of fresh water (the name of the village means "the water").

From Mayya, the Wadi Awsaq forms a deep gorge about 4 km (2.5 mi) long, which directs its channel towards the Sayh Muruq depression, next to the city of Tawiyean, receiving the waters of Wadi Sadakh shortly before it flows into the Wadi Tawiyean.

== Dams and Reservoirs ==
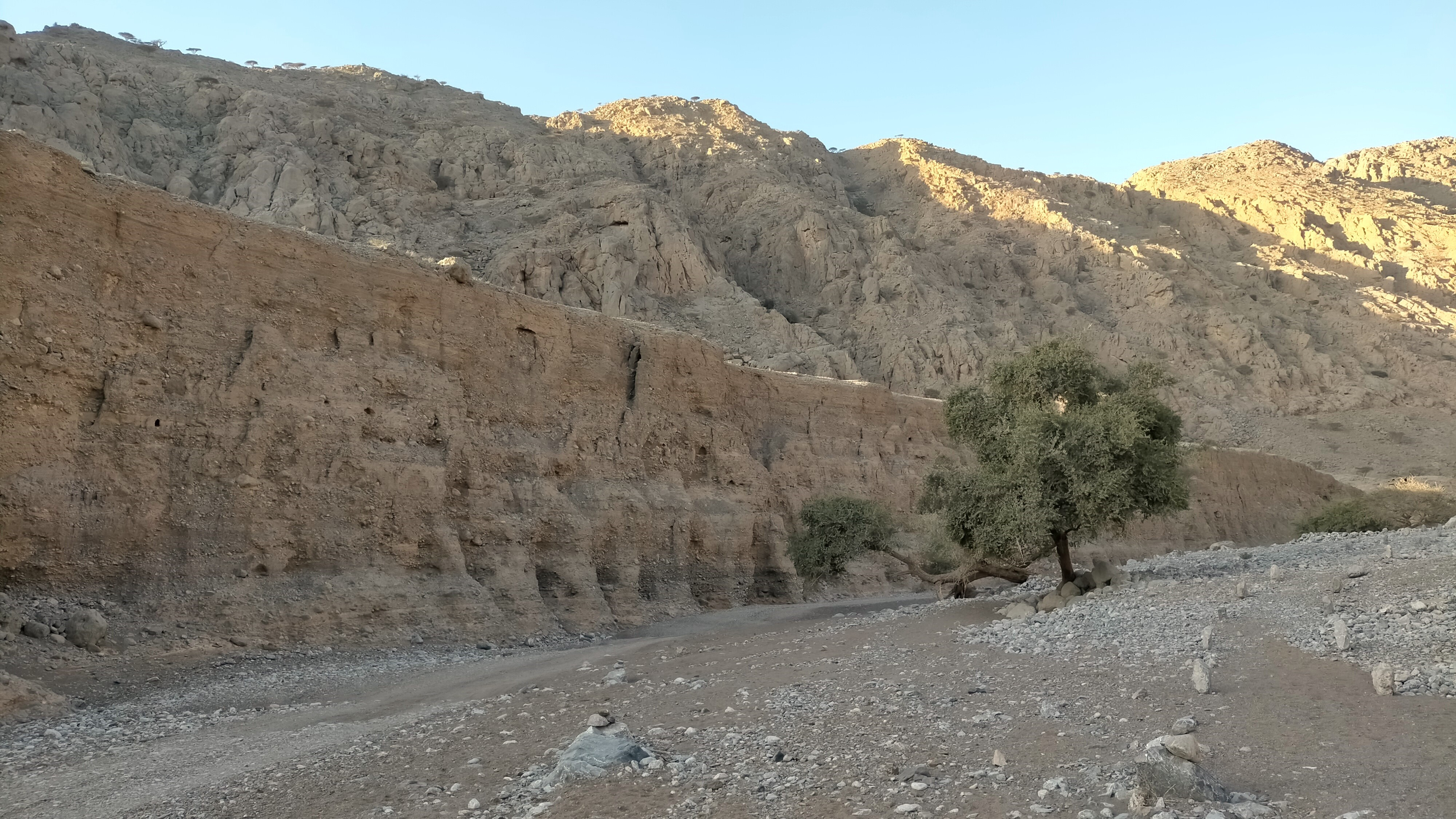
Lower course of the Wadi Awsaq, a tributary of the Wadi Tawiyean - Emirate of Fujairah

As in other regions of the UAE, the geographic area of Wadi Awsaq has occasionally been affected by unusually heavy rainfall and flooding, but no dams have yet been built along its channel.

However, to prevent the danger of flash floods and increase the recharge potential of groundwater, a large dam was built in 1992 across the Wadi Tawiyean, taking advantage of the confluence of the Wadi Awsaq and other major wadis (Wadi Al-Qaliddi, Wadi Sayraq, Wadi Sadakh, Wadi Khabb) in the Sayh Muruq depression.

The dam is 23.5 m (77 ft) high, has a reservoir of 3.75 km^{2} (1.45 mi^{2}) with a capacity of 18.5 million cubic metres, and was officially named Wadi Tawiyean Dam (coordinates: 25°33′57″N, 56°2′56″E).

== Toponymy ==
Alternative names: Wadi Ausaq, Wadi Awsaq, Wadi `Awsaj, Wādī Awsāq, Wādī ‘Awsaj.

The name of Wadi Awsaq (spelled Wadi Ausaq and Wādī Awsāq), its tributaries, mountains, and nearby towns were recorded in documentation and maps produced between 1950 and 1960 by the British Arabist, cartographer, military officer and diplomat Julian F. Walker, during the work carried out to establish the borders between the then-called Trucial States, later completed by the Ministry of Defence of the United Kingdom, on 1:100,000 scale maps published in 1971.

== Population ==
The Wadi Awsaq area was populated mainly by the Sharqiyin tribe, sections or tribal areas of Hafaitat / Ḩufaitāt and Yammahi / Yamāmaḩah.

In the vicinity of Wadi Awsaq and its tributaries, there are archaeological remains that testify to human presence in this area since very ancient times.

== See also ==
- List of wadis of the United Arab Emirates
- List of mountains in the United Arab Emirates
- List of wadis of Oman
- List of mountains in Oman
