= Wadi Khabb (Fujairah) =

Wadi in Oman and UAE

Wadi Khabb (Fujairah) Wādī Khab
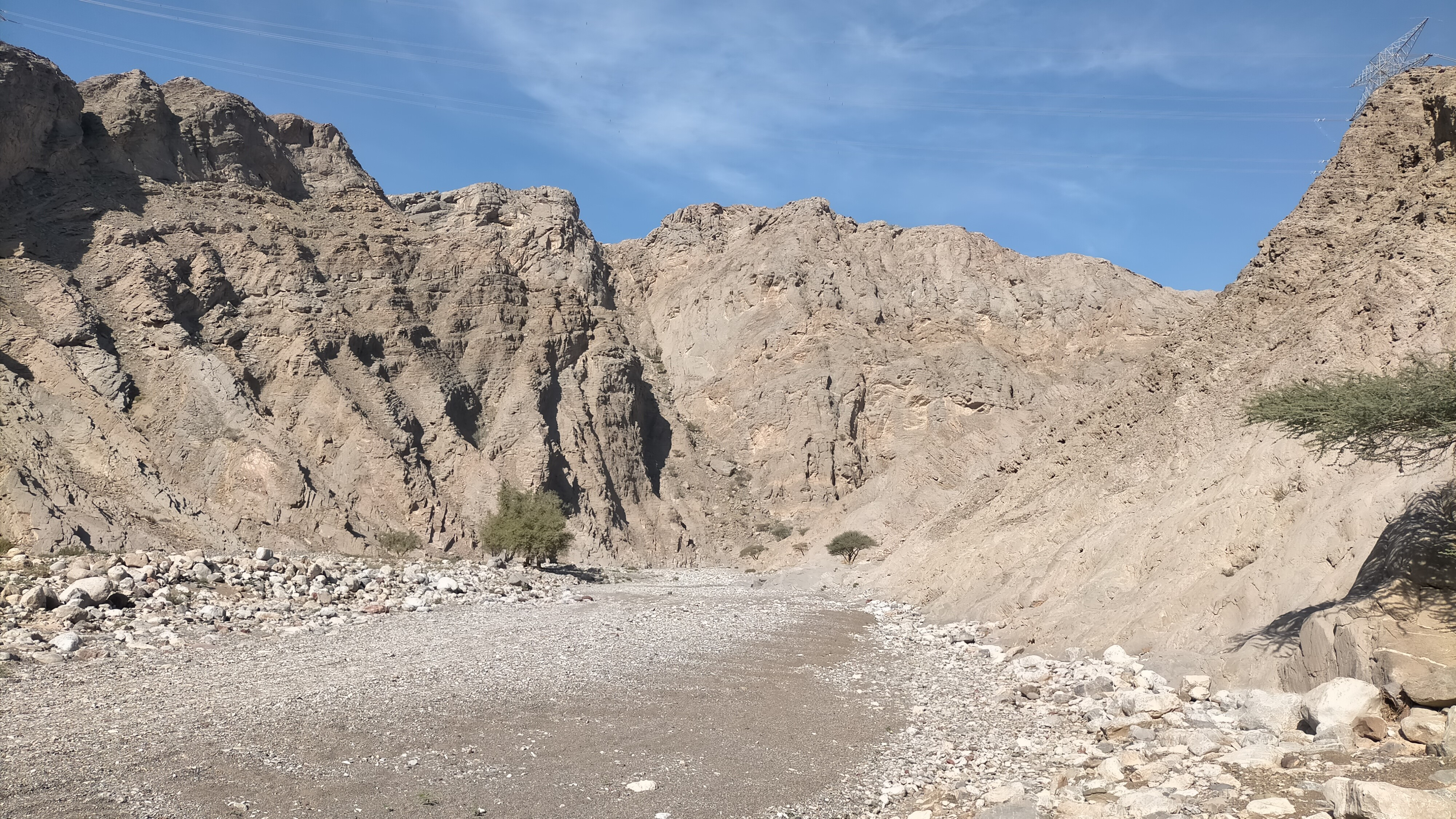

- Location within United Arab Emirates Location within Persian Gulf Location within West and Central Asia
- Native name: وادي خب (Arabic)

Location
- Country: Oman; United Arab Emirates
- Governorate Emirate: Musandam; Fujairah

Physical characteristics
- Source: Along the drainage divide, at the northeastern apex of the drainage basin, approximately 2 km (1.2 mi) east of the Emirati village of Saliya Al-Baqal
  - elevation: 1,348 m (4,423 ft) (approximately)
- Mouth: Confluence with the Wadi Tawiyean.
  - coordinates: 25°33′38.38″N 56°05′22.02″E
  - elevation: 165 m (541 ft)
- Length: 27 km (17 mi)
- Basin size: 208 km^{2} (80 mi^{2})

Basin features
- Progression: Wadi. Intermittent flow
- River system: Wadi Tawiyean
- Tributaries
  - left: Wadi Sidfah, Wadi Ash Sharyah, Wadi Sawabi, Wadi Shakh, Wadi Wa'bayn, Wadi Al Hiyar
  - right: Wadi Ghedah, Wadi Al Kharas

Wadi Khabb (Arabic: وادي خب, romanized: Wādī Khab) is a valley or dry river, with an ephemeral or intermittent flow, occurring almost exclusively during the rainy season, located in the east of the United Arab Emirates, in the Emirate of Fujairah, and in the north of Oman, in the Musandam Governorate.

It is a right tributary of the Wadi Tawiyean and lies within its extensive 208 km^{2} (80 mi^{2}) drainage basin. This basin is bordered to the north by those of the Wadi Khabb Shamsi, Wadi Naqab, and Wadi Nahela, and to the south and west by the basins of Wadi Mu'taridah / Wadi Mutarid and Wadi Basseirah.

The entire Wadi Tawiyean watershed, whose highest peak is Jabal Yibir (1,527 m (5,010 ft)) brings together approximately 222 independent streams, most of them unnamed, all classified into five grades or levels according to the Horton-Strahler numbering. Of these, the principal one, due to its length and flow rate, is the Wadi Khabb.

Among the main tributaries of the Wadi Khabb (sub-tributaries of the Wadi Tawiyean), the most notable are Wadi Ghedah, Wadi Sidfah, Wadi Al Kharas, Wadi Ash Sharyah, Wadi Sawabi, Wadi Shakh, Wadi Wa‘bayn and Wadi Al Hiyar.

== Course ==
The total approximate length of Wadi Khabb is 27 km (17 mi), of which 10 km (6.2 mi) are in Omani territory and 17 km (11 mi) in Emirati territory. Its main source is situated near the drainage divide, at the northeastern apex of the drainage basin, at an altitude of approximately 1,348 m (4,423 ft), approximately 2 km (1.2 mi) east of the Emirati village of Saliya Al-Baqal (Arabic: ديرة سليات الباقل).

In its upper and middle courses, Wadi Khabb flows from north to south, with a steep gradient, crossing the steep mountainous area located in Omani territory, east of Jabal Harf Tila 1,568 m (5,144 ft), and passes through the village of Dīrat Sharmēlah.

Within the UAE, the wadi flows with a very moderate slope through a wide channel, passing the villages of Al Baqil, Al Sharyah, and Shakh.

The easy transit through the lower reaches of the Wadi Khabb led it to be considered in the past as a variant of the historic Qaliddi route that linked the city of Ras Al Khaimah and other towns on the Persian Gulf coast with the city of Dibba on the Gulf of Oman coast.

== Dams and Reservoirs ==
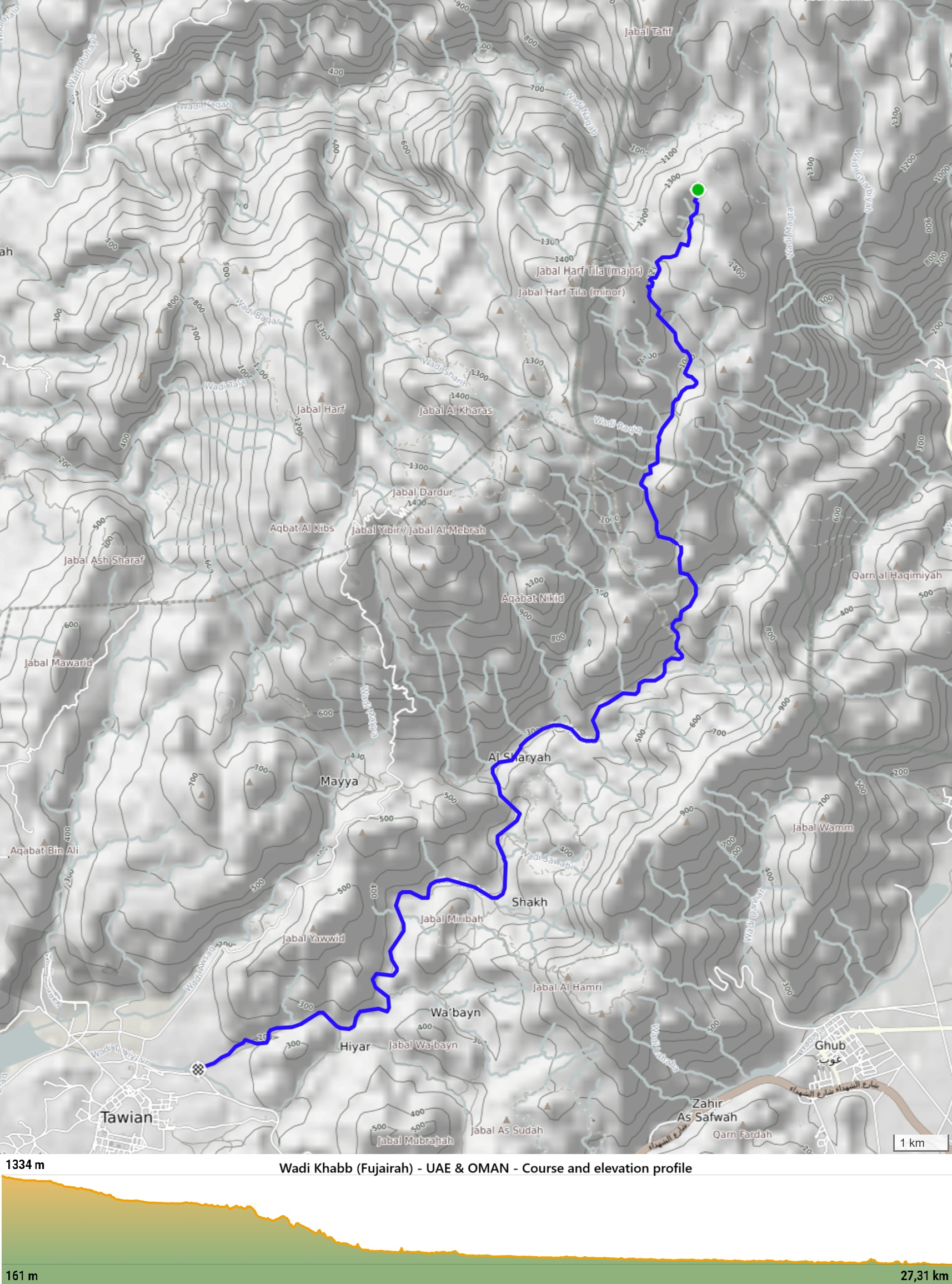
Graph of the course and elevation profile of Wadi Khabb (Fujairah) - Oman and UAE

Similar to other regions in the UAE, the Wadi Khabb area has experienced occasional heavy rainfall and flooding. To mitigate the danger of flash floods and enhance groundwater recharge, however, a large dam was constructed in 1992 across the Wadi Tawiyean, utilizing the confluence of the Wadi Khabb and other significant wadis (Wadi Al-Qaliddi, Wadi Sayraq, Wadi Sadakh, Wadi Awsaq) within the Sayh Muruq depression.

The dam is 23.5 m (77 ft) high, has a reservoir of 3.75 km^{2} (1.45 mi^{2}) with a capacity of 18.5 million cubic metres, and was officially named Wadi Tawiyean Dam (coordinates: 25°33′57″N, 56°2′56″E).

== Toponymy ==
Alternative names: Wadi Khab, Wādī Khab, Wadi Khabb, Wādī Khabb.

The name of Wadi Khabb (spelled Wādī Khab), its tributaries, mountains and nearby towns were recorded in the documentation and maps drawn up between 1950 and 1960 by the British Arabist, cartographer, military officer and diplomat Julian F. Walker, during the work carried out to establish the borders between the then called Trucial States, later completed by the Ministry of Defence of the United Kingdom, on 1:100,000 scale maps published in 1971.

In the National Atlas of the United Arab Emirates it appears as Wādī Khab.

== Population ==
The Wadi Khabb area was historically populated mainly by the Sharqiyin tribe, specifically the Hafaitat (Ḩufaitāt) and Yammahi (Yamāmaḩah) sections or tribal areas.

== See also ==
- List of wadis of the United Arab Emirates
- List of mountains in the United Arab Emirates
- List of wadis of Oman
- List of mountains in Oman
