= Baqal =

Baqal may refer to:

- Baqal, Iran
- Baqal, United Arab Emirates
