= Wadi Al Kharas =

Wadi in UAE

Wadi Al Kharas Wādī Likhras
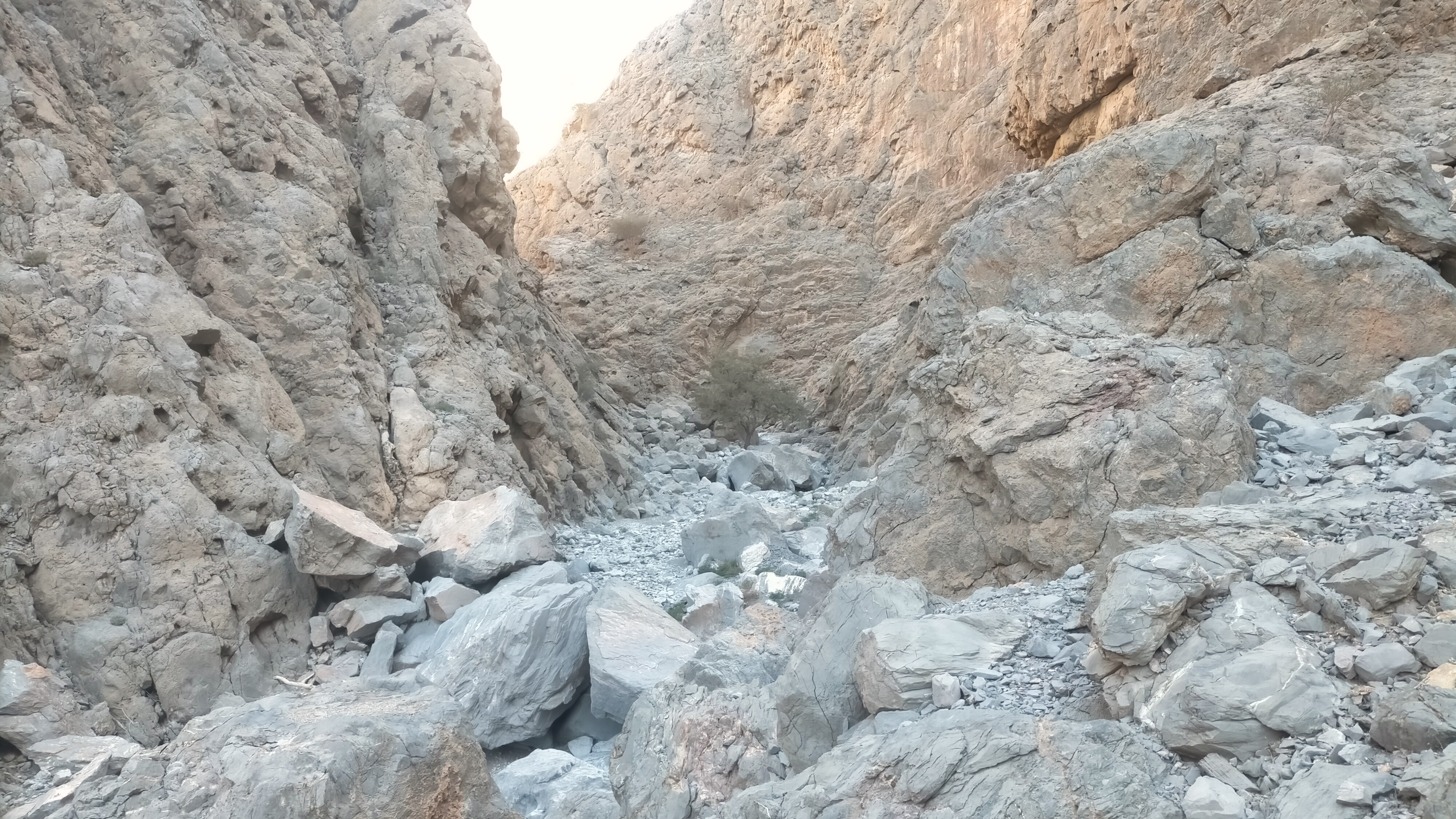
- Wadi Al Kharas, tributary of Wadi Khabb

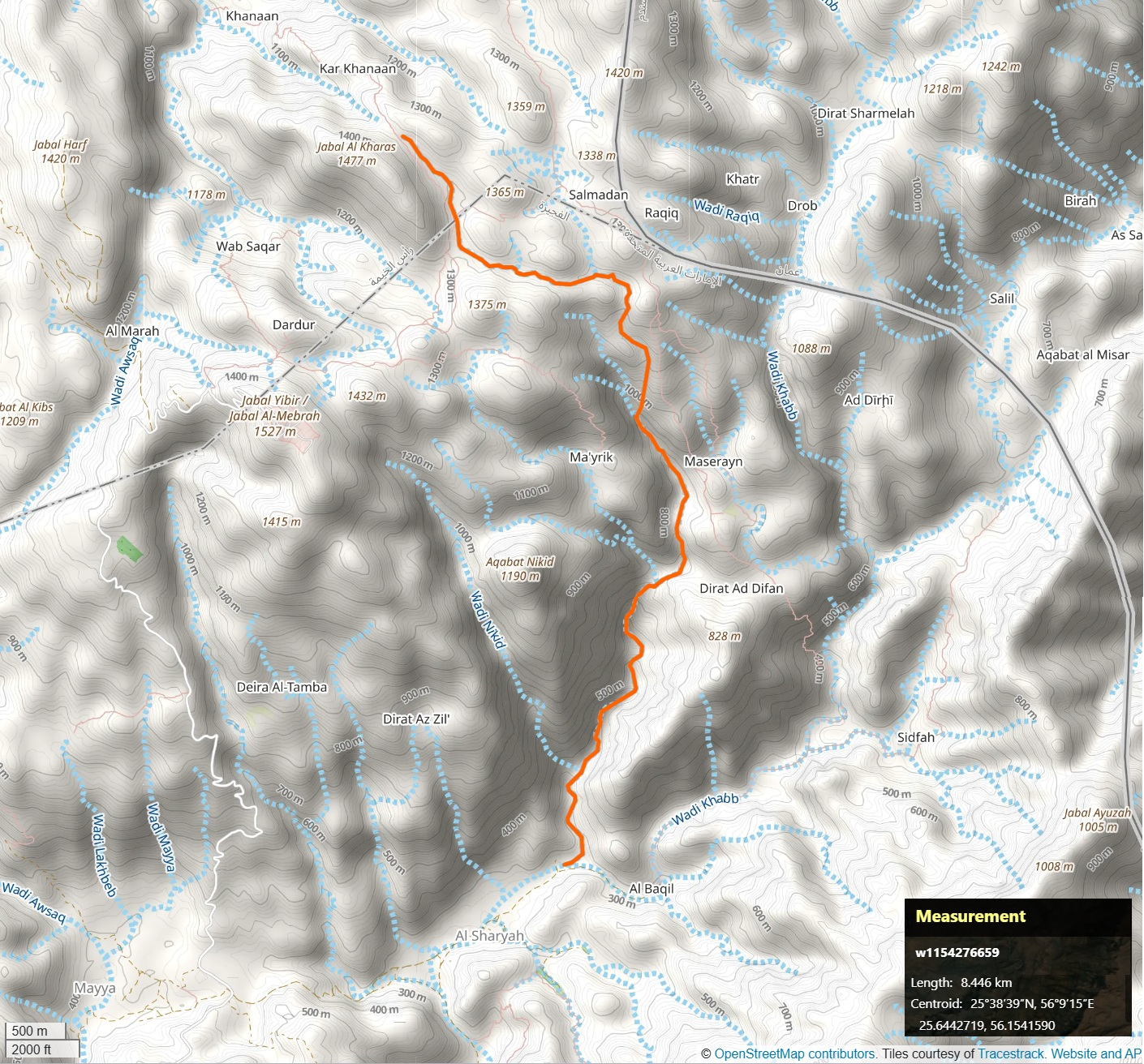
- Location and course of Wadi Al Kharas

- Location within United Arab Emirates Location within Persian Gulf Location within West and Central Asia
- Native name: وادي لخرس (Arabic)

Location
- Country: United Arab Emirates
- Emirate: Ras al-Khaimah; Fujairah

Physical characteristics
- Source: On the northeastern slope of Jabal Al Kharas (1,477 m (4,846 ft)).
  - elevation: 1,328 m (4,357 ft), approximately
- Mouth: Wadi Khabb (Fujairah)
  - coordinates: 25°36′59″N 56°09′10″E
  - elevation: 279 m (915 ft)
- Length: 8.5 km (5.3 mi)
- Basin size: 208 km^{2} (80 mi^{2}) (Wadi Tawiyean basin).

Basin features
- Progression: Wadi. Intermittent flow
- River system: Wadi Tawiyean
- Tributaries
  - left: Wadi Salmadan
  - right: Wadi Al Masirek, Wadi Nikid

Wadi Al Kharas, also known as Wadi Lakharas (Arabic: وادي لخرس, romanized: Wādī Likhras) is a valley or dry river with ephemeral or intermittent flow, which flows almost exclusively during the rainy season, located in the emirates of Ras al-Khaimah and Fujairah, in the east of the United Arab Emirates.

It is a tributary of the Wadi Khabb and a sub-tributary of Wadi Tawiyean, to whose 208 km^{2} (80 mi^{2}) hydrographic basin it belongs.

== Course ==
The total approximate length of Wadi Al Kharas is 8.5 km (5.3 mi).

It flows from north to south, and its main source is located at an altitude of approximately 1,328 m (4,357 ft), on the northeastern slope of Jabal Al Kharas (1,477 m (4,846 ft)), next to the mountain pass of Al Kharas (Al Kharas Col, 1,335 m (4,380 ft)), which defines the drainage divide between the Wadi Naqab and Wadi Tawiyean basins.

Although the Wadi Al Kharas runs with a gentle gradient in its initial course, its middle and lower sections follow a steep path, forming rock gorges that is highly polished by erosion. These sections feature multiple dry waterfalls and pools, which make access difficult and prevent the use of its channel as a means of communication, requiring rock climbing or canyoning equipment and techniques.

Along its course, the Wadi Al Kharas borders to the west the mountain villages of Maserayn and Difan, and receives water from smaller tributary wadis and ravines, including Wadi Salmadan, Wadi Al Masirek, and Wadi Nikid.

The Wadi Al Kharas flows into the Wadi Khabb between the villages of Al Baqil and Al Sharyah.

== Toponymy ==
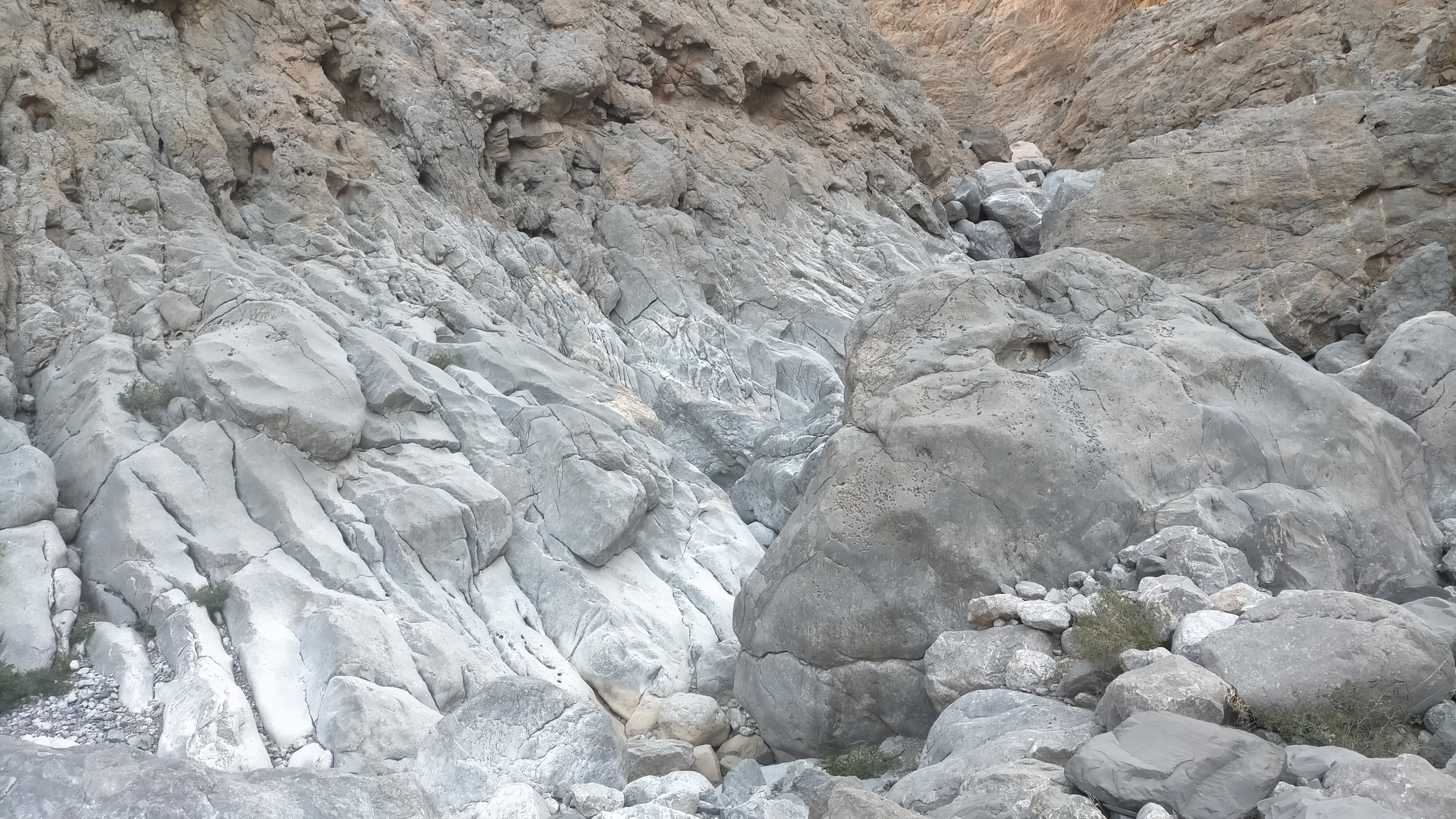
Steep channel, with rock gorges highly polished by erosion

Alternative names: Wadi al Kharas, Wādī al Kharas, Wadi Lakharas, Wādī Likhras, Wadi Kharras, Wadi Kharas.

The name of Wadi Al Kharas (with the spelling Wadi Lakharas and Wādī al Kharas), its tributaries, mountains, and nearby settlements, was recorded in the documentation and maps prepared between 1950 and 1960 by the British Arabist, cartographer, military, and diplomat Julian F. Walker, during the work carried out to establish borders among the then-named Trucial States. These were subsequently completed by the Ministry of Defence (United Kingdom) on 1:100,000 scale maps published in 1971.

For several years, the village of Difan, through which the wadi passes, was wrongly identified in some geographic databases as Sidaqah / Şidfah, which in fact corresponds to a village located two kilometers away, in the territory of the Sultanate of Oman. As a result of this confusion, for some time Wadi Al Kharas was also mistakenly known by some hikers and climbers as Wadi Sidaqah.

In the National Atlas of the United Arab Emirates it appears with the spelling Wādī Likhras (Arabic: وادي لخرس).

== Population ==
The area of Wadi Al Kharas was mainly populated by the Sharqiyin tribe, specifically sections or tribal areas of Hafaitat / Ḩufaitāt and Yammahi / Yamāmaḩah.

== See also ==
- List of wadis of the United Arab Emirates
- List of mountains in the United Arab Emirates
- List of wadis of Oman
- List of mountains in Oman
