= Wadi Ash Sharyah =

Wadi in UAE

Wadi Ash Sharyah Wādī Ash Sharyah
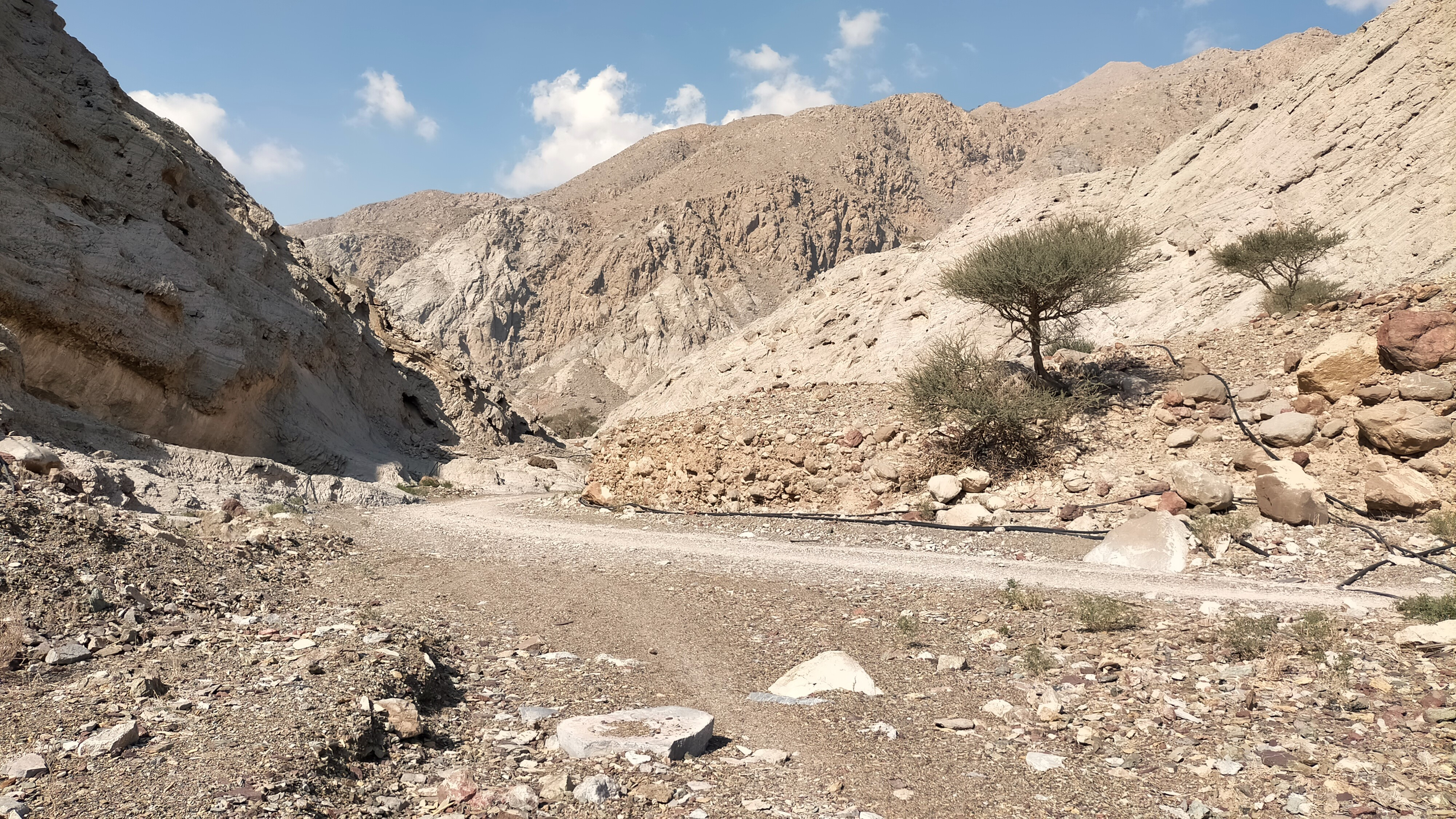
- Lower course of Wadi Ash Sharyah

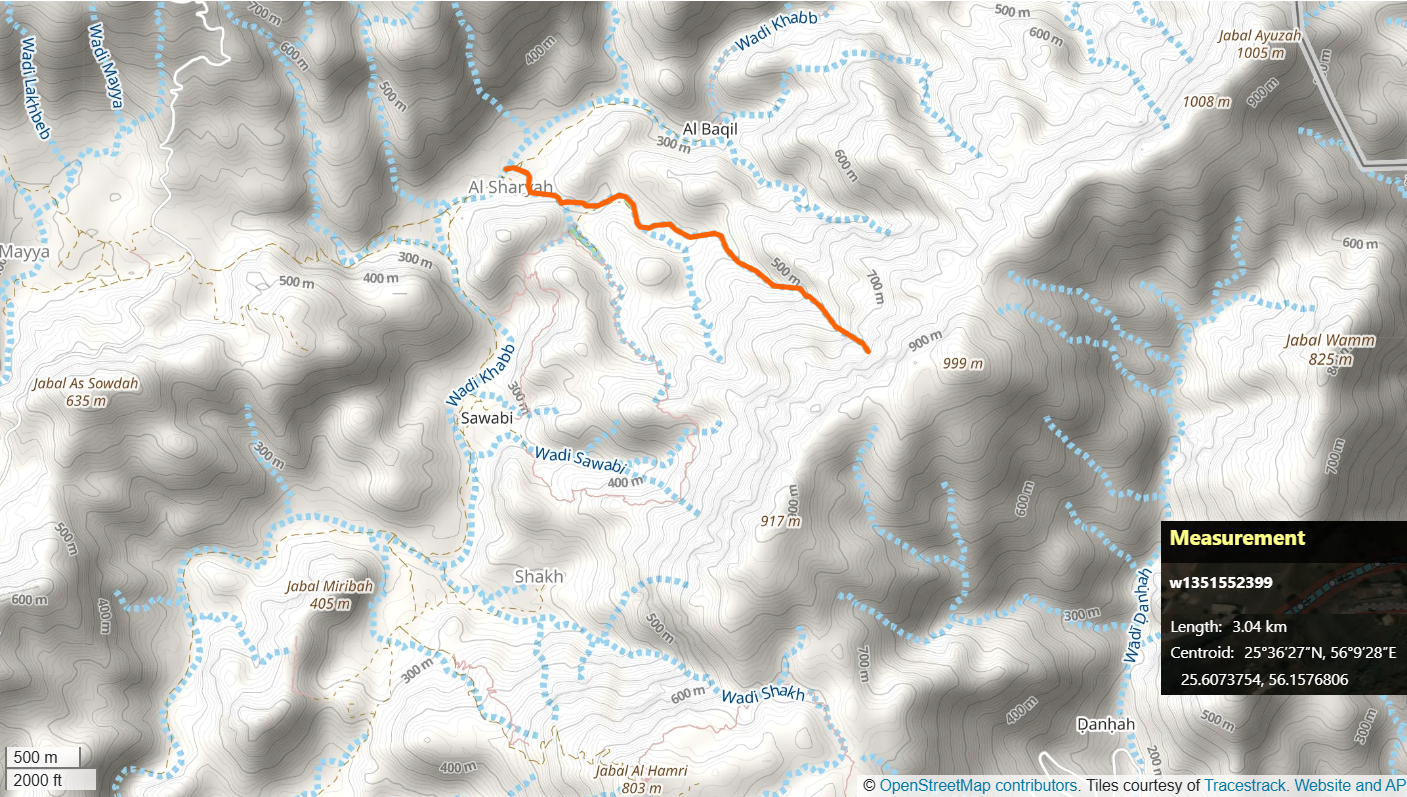
- Location and course of Wadi Ash Sharyah

- Location within United Arab Emirates Location within Persian Gulf Location within West and Central Asia
- Native name: وادي الشريه (Arabic)

Location
- Country: United Arab Emirates
- Emirate: Fujairah

Physical characteristics
- Source: On the eastern slope of Jabal Shariya (999 m (3,278 ft)).
  - elevation: 754 m (2,474 ft), approximately
- Mouth: Wadi Khabb (Fujairah)
  - coordinates: 25°36′43″N 56°08′45″E
  - elevation: 269 m (883 ft)
- Length: 3 km (1.9 mi)
- Basin size: 208 km^{2} (80 mi^{2}) (Wadi Tawiyean basin).

Basin features
- Progression: Wadi. Intermittent flow
- River system: Wadi Tawiyean

Wadi Ash Sharyah, also known as Wadi Al Sharyah (Arabic: وادي الشريه, romanized: Wādī Ash Sharyah) is a valley or dry river with ephemeral or intermittent flow, which flows almost exclusively during the rainy season, located in the emirate of Fujairah, in the east of the United Arab Emirates.

It is a tributary of the Wadi Khabb and a subtributary of the Wadi Tawiyean, to whose 208 km^{2} (80 mi^{2}) hydrographic basin it belongs.

== Course ==
The total approximate length of Wadi Ash Sharyah is 3 km (1.9 mi).

It flows from southwest to northeast, and its main source is located at an approximate altitude of 754 m (2,474 ft), on the eastern slope of Jabal Shariya (999 m (3,278 ft)), next to the drainage divide that separates the drainage basins draining into the Gulf of Oman from those draining into the Persian Gulf and inland plains.

Along its course, the Wadi Ash Sharyah passes through the village of Al Sharyah, which extends mainly along its mouth, along both banks of the Wadi Khabb, and also has a rural area inland, which contains numerous farms and plantations.

The main course of Wadi Ash Sharyah receives water from smaller wadis and tributary ravines, including the one known as Ain Al Sharyah (the source or spring of Al Sharyah), with its lush palm grove and farmland.

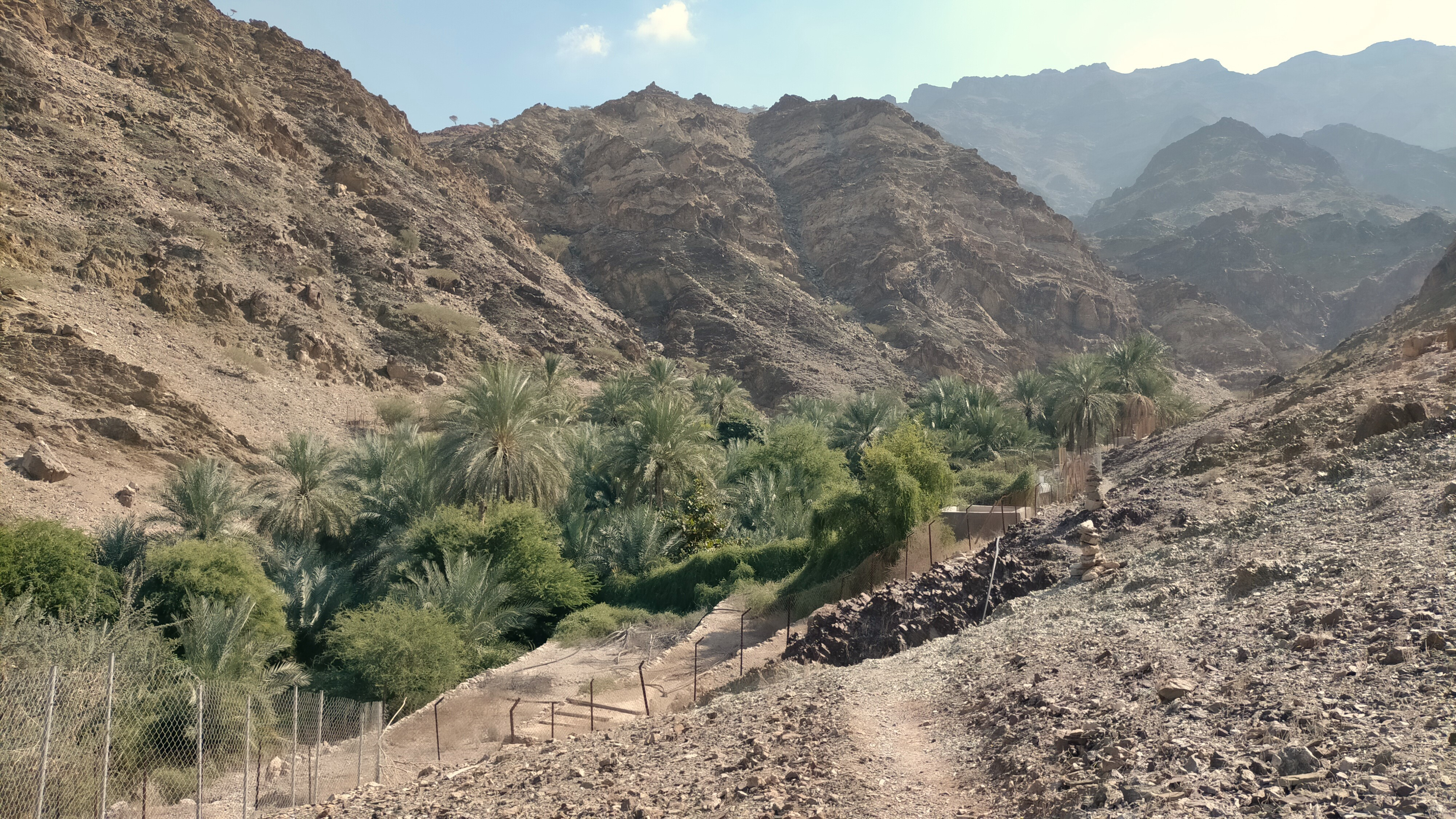
Lush palm grove in Ain Al Sharyah, tributary spring of Wadi Ash Sharyah

The latter has become very popular in recent years, because a picturesque trail, known as the Geological Trail or Ain Al Sharyah Trail runs through part of its course. This trail also passes by the archaeological site of Ghar Khail (petroglyphs), located in the neighboring Wadi Sawabi, a tributary of the Wadi Khabb.

== Toponymy ==
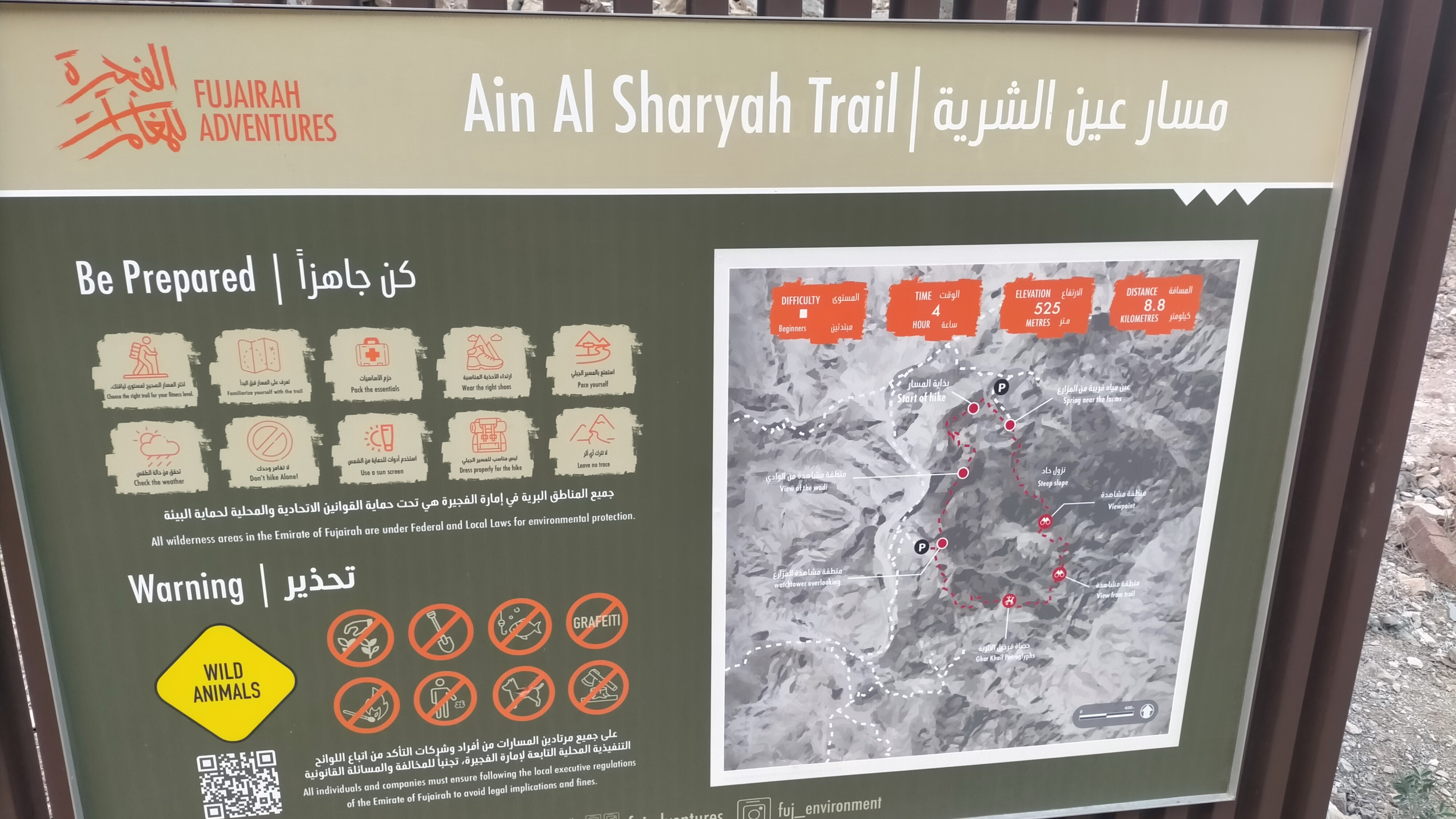
Ain Al Sharyah Trail

Alternative names: Wadī Ash Sharyah, Wadī As Sharyah, Wadi Al Sheria, Wadi Al Sharyah, Wadi Sharia.

The name of the Wadi Ash Sharyah (with the spelling Wadi Shariya), its tributaries, mountains, and nearby settlements, was recorded in the documentation and maps prepared between 1950 and 1960 by the British Arabist, cartographer, military, and diplomat Julian F. Walker, during the work carried out to establish borders among the then-named Trucial States. These were subsequently completed by the Ministry of Defence (United Kingdom) on 1:100,000 scale maps published in 1971.

In the National Atlas of the United Arab Emirates it appears with the spelling Wādī Ash Sharyah (Arabic: وادي الشريه).

== Population ==
The Wadi Ash Sharyah area was populated mainly by the Sharqiyin tribe, specifically the Hafaitat / Ḩufaitāt and Yammahi / Yamāmaḩah sections or tribal areas.

== See also ==
- List of wadis of the United Arab Emirates
- List of mountains in the United Arab Emirates
- List of wadis of Oman
- List of mountains in Oman
