= Baqal, Iran =

Baqal بقال
- village
- Location within Iran
- Coordinates: 33°23′05″N 59°57′33″E
- Country: Iran
- Province: South Khorasan
- County: Zirkuh
- Bakhsh: Zohan
- Rural District: Zohan

Population (2006)
  - Total: 181
- Time zone: UTC+3:30 (IRST)
  - Summer (DST): UTC+4:30 (IRDT)

Baqal (Persian: بقال, also Romanized as Baqāl and Boqāl; also known as Bi Aghol and Bi ‘Aqal) is a village in Zohan Rural District, Zohan District, Zirkuh County, South Khorasan Province, Iran. At the 2006 census, its population was 181, in 50 families.
