= Baqal, Ras Al Khaimah =

Village in the UAE

Baqal ديرة البقال
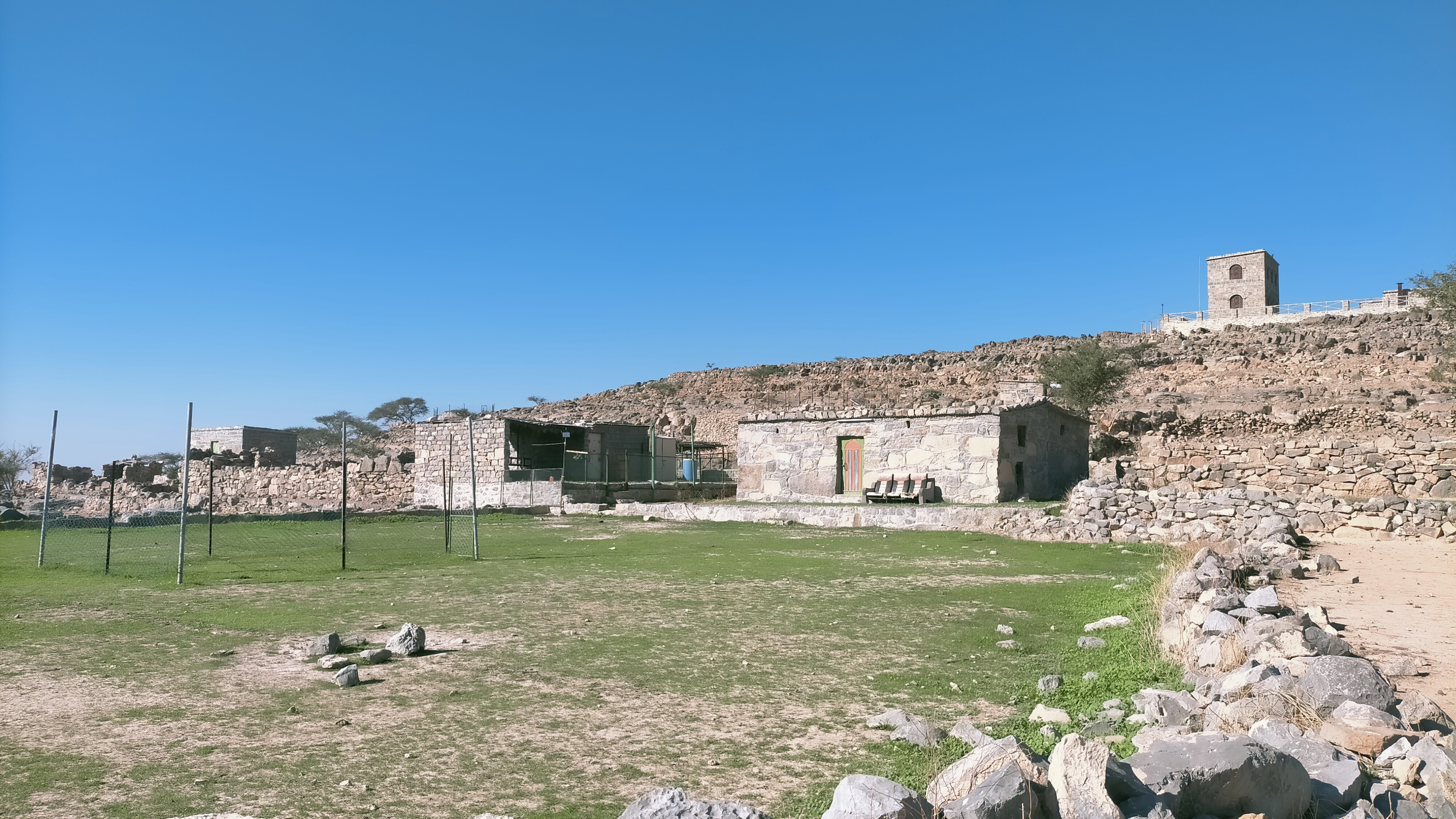
- Baqal - Village in United Arab Emirates, on the banks of the upper course of the Wadi Baqal

- Location within United Arab Emirates Location within Persian Gulf Location within Middle East Location within West and Central Asia
- Coordinates: 25°41′22″N 56°05′18″E
- Country: United Arab Emirates
- Emirate: Ras Al Khaimah

Area
  - Total: 0.38 km^{2} (0.15 sq mi)
- Elevation: 860 m (2,820 ft)
- Time zone: UTC+04:00

Baqal (Arabic: ديرة البقال, romanized: Al Baqqāl) is a small agricultural and livestock town, located in the northeast of the U.A.E., in the Hajar Mountains of the Emirate of Ras Al Khaimah.

The town extends along a small plateau, at the foot of a hill, at about 860 m (2,820 ft), on the limit of the drainage divide between the drainage basin of Wadi Naqab and Wadi Nahela, very close to Jabal Baqal (1,026 metres (3,366 feet)).

To the southeast, the town stands on the cliff that forms the right side of the riverbed of the Wadi Baqal, a tributary of the Wadi Nahela, which descends from the northwest slope of Jabal Harf (1,420 m), very close to the village of Tala, and which as it passes through Baqal forms a 90º bend to continue its course towards the south-southwest.

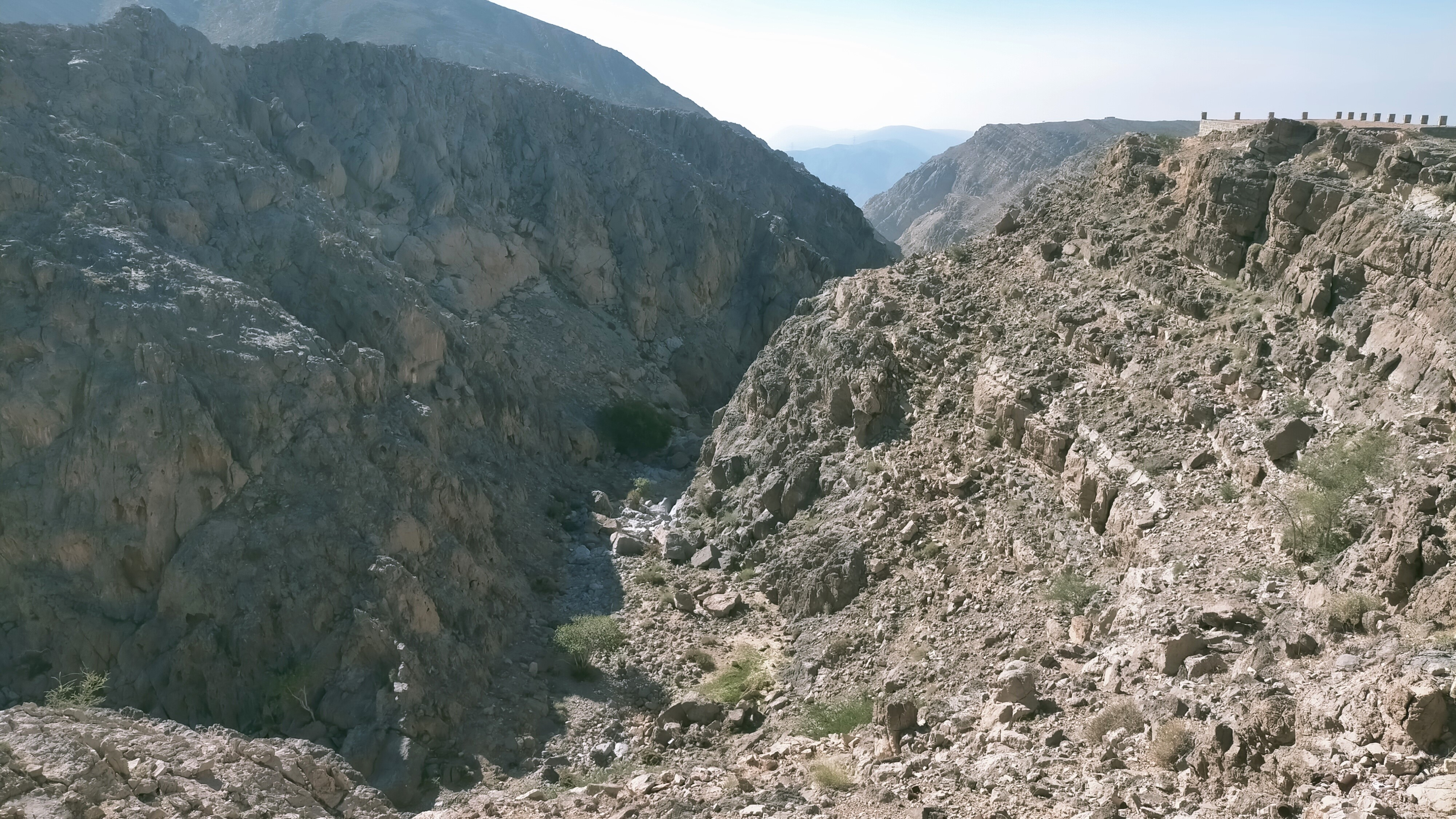
View of Wadi Baqal, a tributary of Wadi Nahela, as it passes through the town of Baqal

The town has about 50 houses, many of them rebuilt and renovated following a traditional style, and numerous terraces supported by dry stone walls, which allow water and soil to be retained, intended mainly for planting wheat and barley.

There are also multiple channels to collect and direct water runoff to the cisterns, and some sheepfolds and other buildings.

A few years ago, construction of a dirt road of almost 4 km began, linking the town with the dirt road that runs through the Wadi Naqab, providing access by all-terrain vehicles, but the work was not completed. Currently, it is only possible to reach Baqal, or transport provisions, construction elements, household goods, or other supplies, on foot or with donkey trains.

The trail from Wadi Naqab to Baqal and Tala is a popular hiking destination.

== Toponymy ==
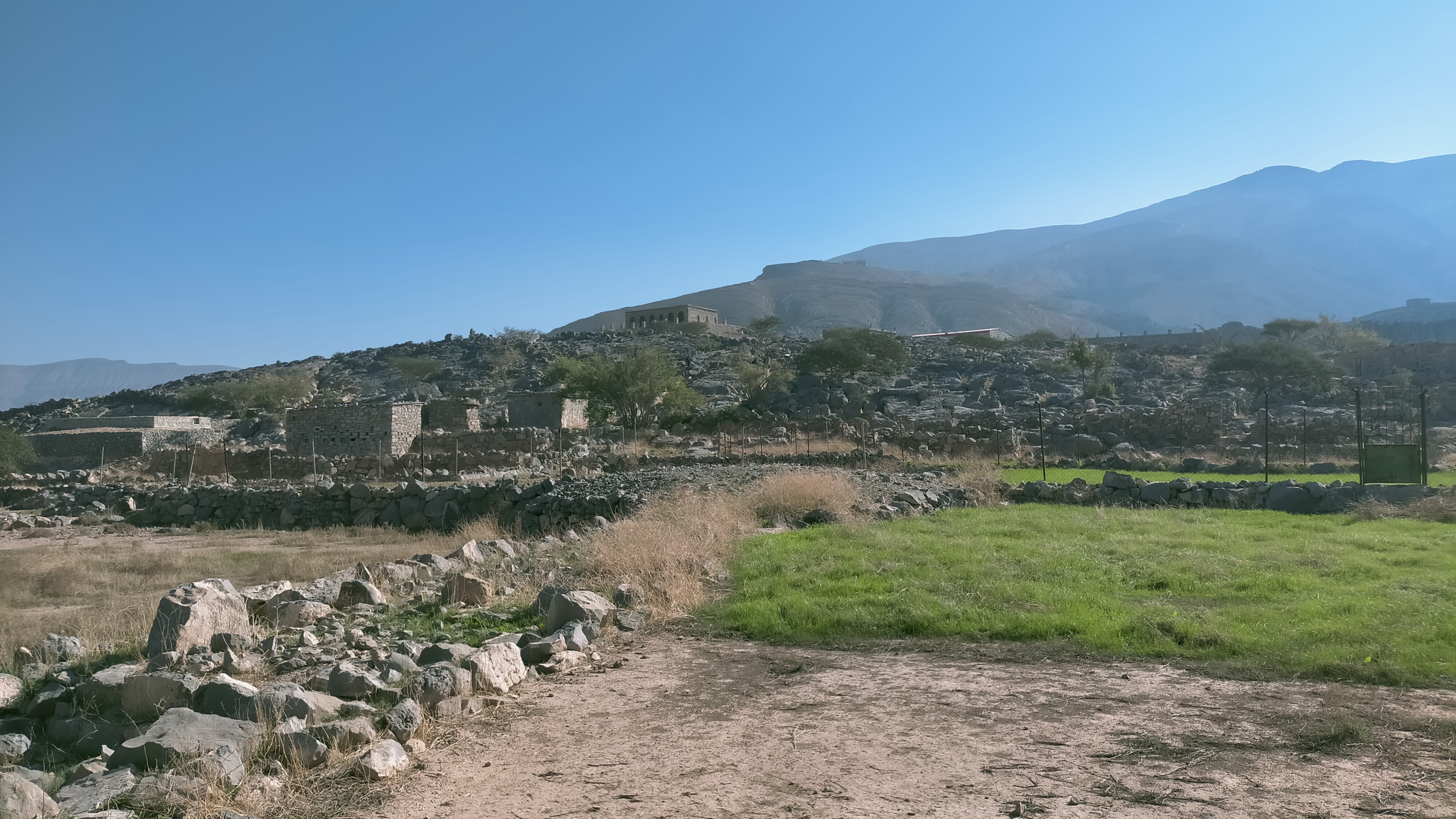
Old and new constructions

Alternative names: Baqāl, Al Baqqāl, Baqqāl, Deira Al Baqqal, Dirat Al Baqal.

The names of the town of Baqal, Wadi Baqal and other names in the area were recorded in the documentation and maps prepared between 1950 and 1960 by the British Arabist, cartographer, military officer and diplomat Julian F. Walker, during the work carried out for the establishment of borders between the then called Trucial States, later completed by the Ministry of Defense of the United Kingdom, on maps at a scale of 1:100,000 published in 1971.

In The National Atlas of the United Arab Emirates it is referenced with the spelling Al Baqqāl.

== Population ==
The entire area near Baqal was populated mainly by the Habus tribe, corresponding to the tribal area of Bani Hasan.

Baqal is also home to members of the Shihuh tribe. Many of the village's former residents and their descendants visit the village in the cooler winter months.

== See also ==
- List of wadis of the United Arab Emirates
- List of mountains in the United Arab Emirates
