= Jebel Al Mebrah =

Mountain in the United Arab Emirates

Jabal Yibir
- Jabal Al-Mebrah
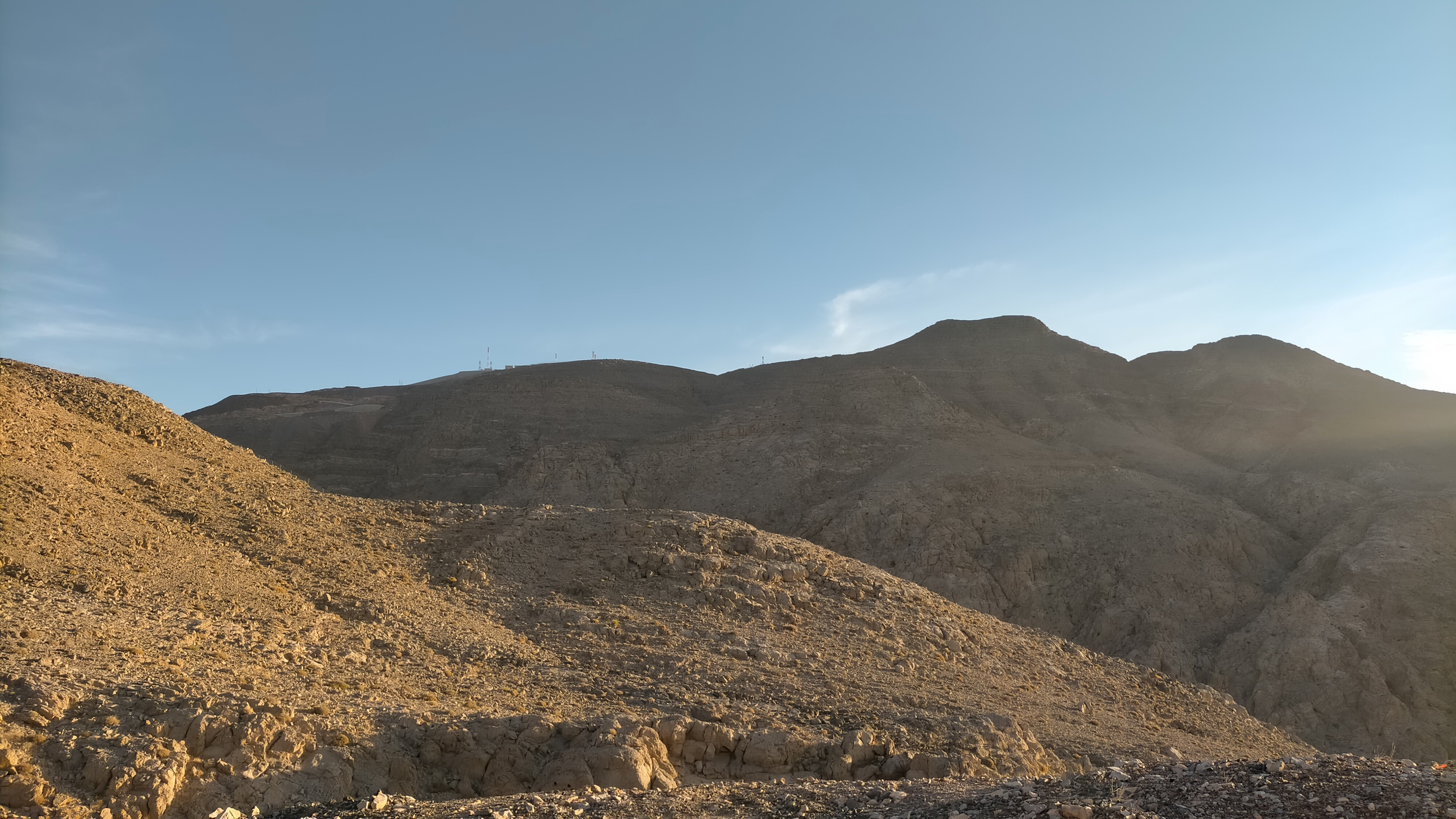
- View of Jabal Yibir from the road, at an altitude of 1080 meters

Highest point
- Elevation: 1,527 m (5,010 ft)
- Prominence: 216 m (709 ft)
- Isolation: 4.93 km (3.06 mi)
- Coordinates: 25°38′54″N 56°07′45″E

Naming
- Native name: Arabic: جَبَل يِبِر

Geography
- Location within United Arab Emirates Location within Persian Gulf Location within West and Central Asia
- Location: Emirate of Fujairah, the UAE
- Country: United Arab Emirates
- Emirate: Fujairah
- Parent range: Hajar Mountains

Jabal Yibir (Arabic: جَبَل يِبِر), also known as Jabal Mebrah or Jabal Al-Mebrah (Arabic: جَبَل ٱلْمبْرَح, romanized: Jabal Mibraḥ), is a mountain located in the western part of the Hajar Mountains, northeast of the United Arab Emirates, between the emirates of Fujairah and Ras Al Khaimah.

Its summit is located in the Emirate of Fujairah, and has an elevation of 1,527 m (5,010 ft), a prominence of 216 m (709 ft), and a topographic isolation of 4.93 km (3.06 mi).

It is the highest mountain in the Emirate of Fujairah and is part of a larger elevated massif, surrounded by steep slopes and other smaller peaks that exceed 1,400 m (4,600 ft) in altitude, delimiting the Water Divide Line between the drainage basin of Wadi Tawiyean and Wadi Naqab.

== Access ==
At the summit of Jabal Yibir there is a military installation, radars and communications antennas, and it is not accessible to the public.

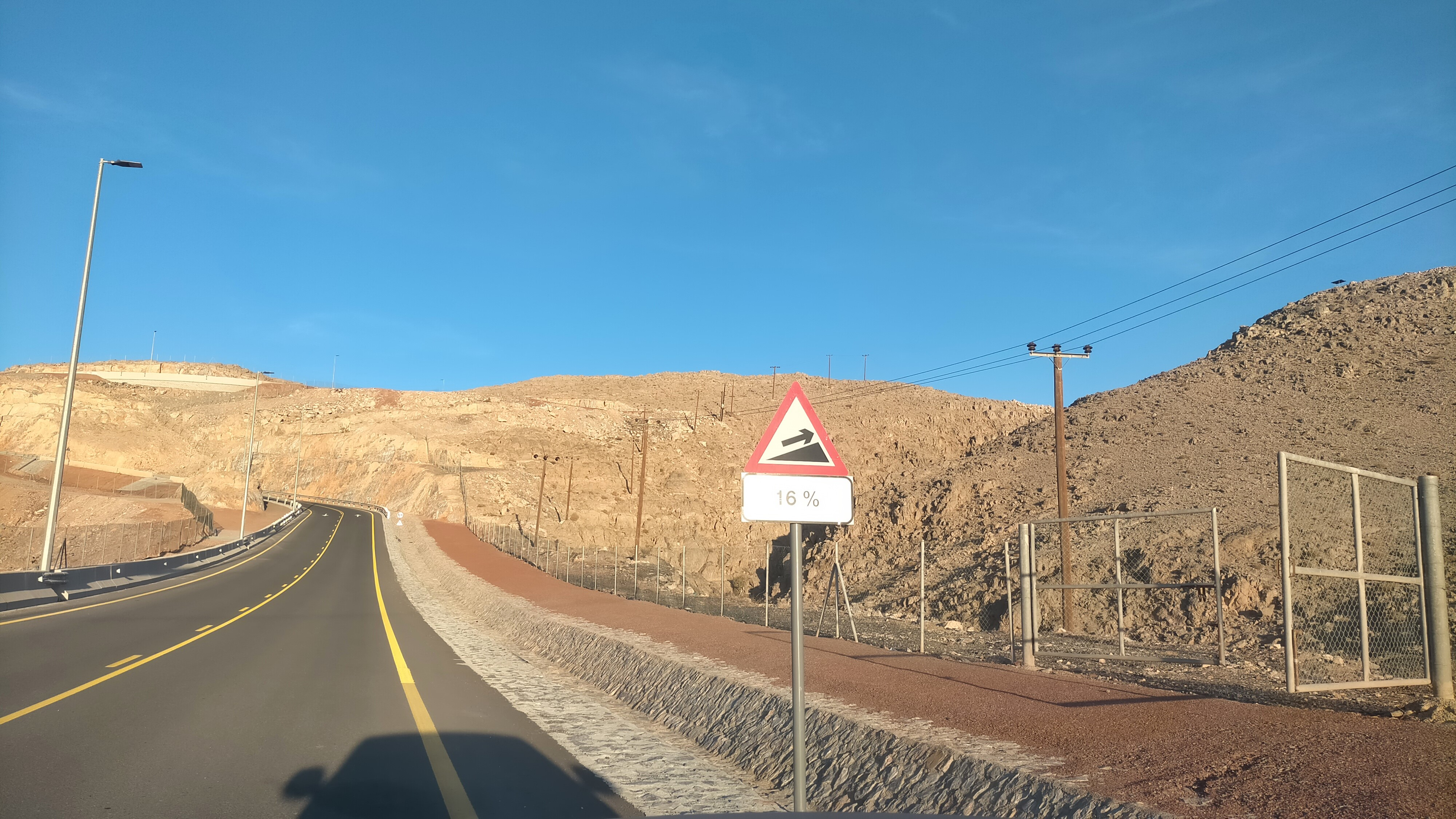
Modern access road to Jabal Yibir, paved and safe, but with sections of a 16% gradient

After several years, the construction of a winding paved road from Al Tawiyeen / Aţ Ţawyēn was completed in 2024, with sections of a 16% gradient, but with a modern layout, good surface and safety.

At an altitude of 1,227 m (4,026 ft), 2.6 km (1.6 mi) before the summit, there is a police checkpoint. After identification, access is usually permitted up to an altitude of 1,360 m (4,460 ft), one kilometer before the military installations.

== Toponymy ==
Alternative names: Jabal Yibir, Jabal Al-Mebrah, Jabal Mibraḥ, Jabal Al-Mebraḥ, Jabal Mibrah, Jabal al Mebrah, Jabal al Mibrah, Jabal Mebrah, Jebel Al Mebrah

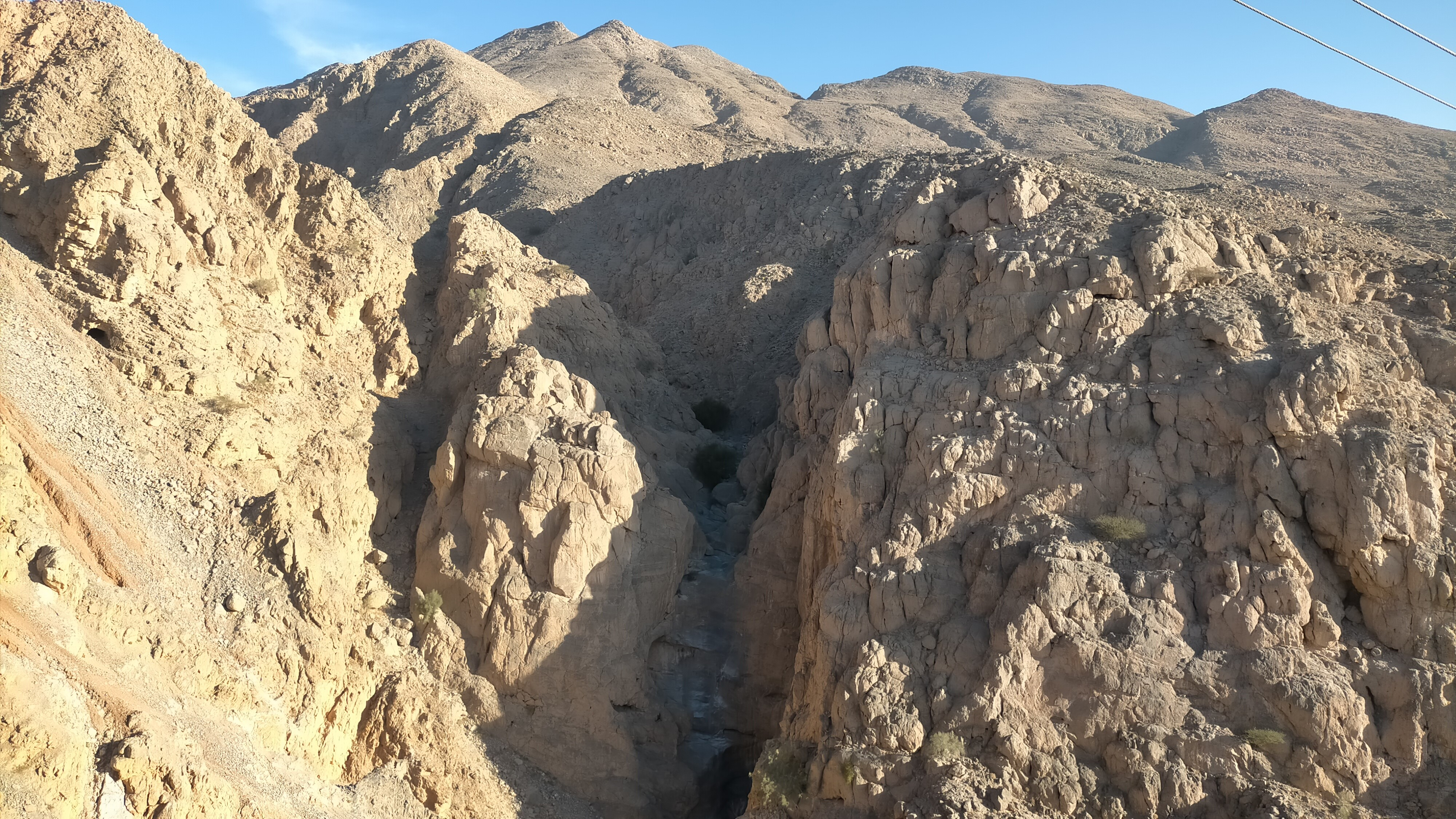
Deep gorge and dry waterfall, near the village of Deira Al-Tamba, on the southern slope of Jabal Yibir

The name of the Jabal Yibir appears recorded in the documents and maps produced between 1950 and 1960 by the British Arabist, cartographer, military man and diplomat Julian F. Walker, on the occasion of the work carried out for the establishment of the borders between the then-called Trucial States, later completed by the UK Ministry of Defence with 1:100,000 scale maps published in 1971, and in other maps and earlier documents held in the UK National Archives.

In the National Atlas of the United Arab Emirates it is referenced with the spelling Jabal Mibraḥ.

== Population ==
The territory of Jabal Yibir was historically populated by the sharqiyin or sharquiyin tribe (Arabic: الشرقيون), mainly by the Hafaitat / Ḩufaitāt and Yammahi / Yamāmaḩah tribal sections.

== See also ==
- List of mountains in the United Arab Emirates
- List of wadis of the United Arab Emirates
- List of mountains in Oman
- List of wadis in Oman
- Geography of Asia
- Geography of Oman
