= Wadi Nahela =

Wadi in UAE

Wadi Nahela Wādī Ghēl
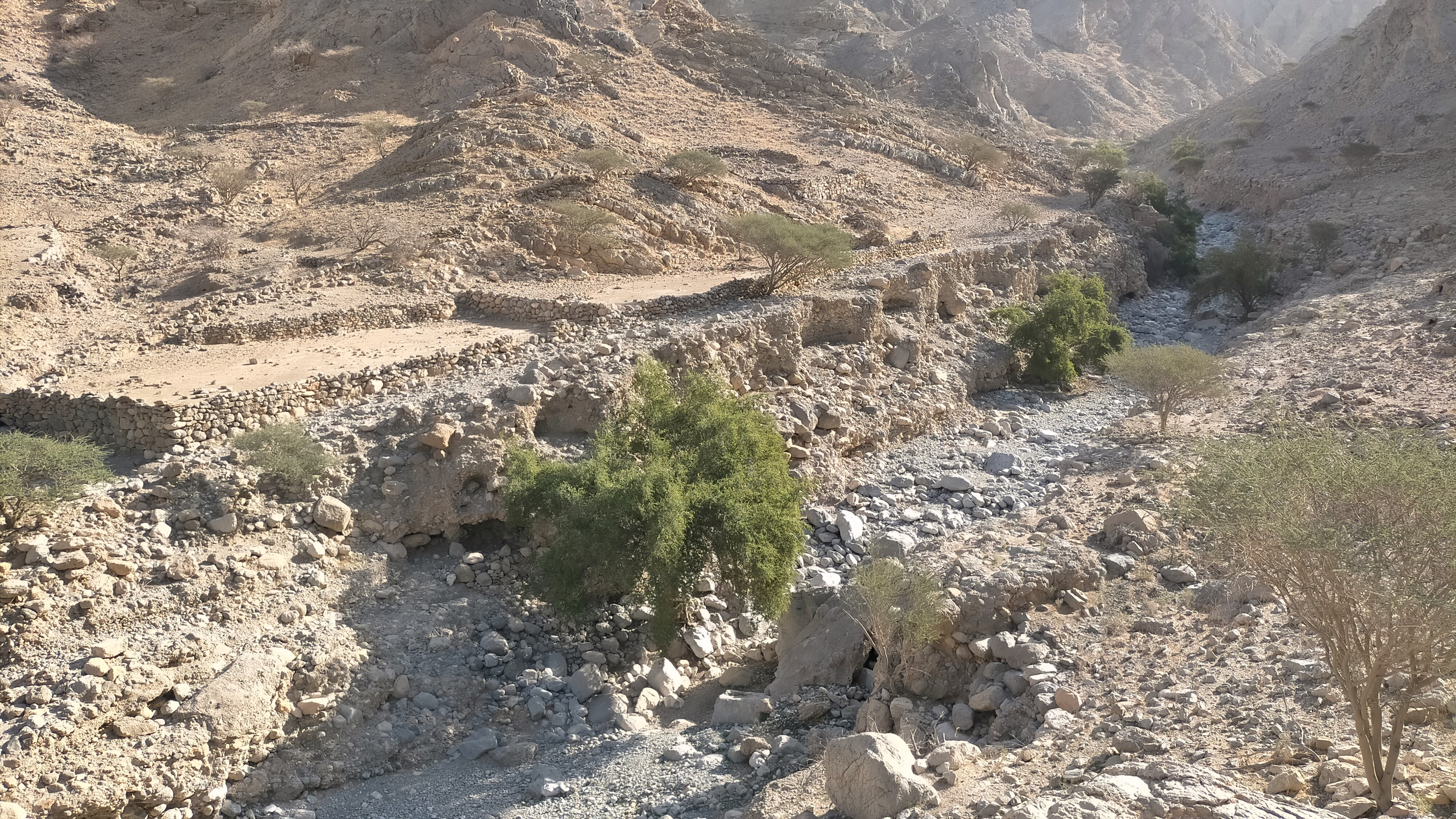
- Wadi Nahela - middle course. View from the ruins area of an old village

- Location within United Arab Emirates Location within Persian Gulf Location within West and Central Asia
- Native name: وادي نحيله (Arabic)

Location
- Country: United Arab Emirates
- Emirate: Ras Al Khaimah

Physical characteristics
- Source: At an equidistant point located between the Jabal Ash Sharaf 639 m (2,096 ft) and Aqbat Al Kibs 1,209 m (3,967 ft), in the Emirate of Ras Al Khaimah.
  - elevation: 903 m (2,963 ft)
- Mouth: In the Sе̄ḩ Al Bīr area, which is part of the large Jiri plain floodplain, on the administrative boundary between Al Fahlain, and the historic city of Khatt.
  - coordinates: 25°39′16.34″N 55°59′58.13″E
  - elevation: 21 m (69 ft)
- Length: 15.3 km (9.5 mi)
- Basin size: 38.84 km^{2} (15.00 mi^{2})

Basin features
- River system: Wadi Nahela / Wādī Ghēl / Wadi Ghil
- Tributaries
  - left: Wadi Diwerah and Wadi Al Mawarid
  - right: Wadi Baqal

Wadi Nahela (Arabic: وادي نحيله, romanized: Wādī Nḥīlh), also known as Wādī Ghēl, Wadi Ghil, Wadi Nahail, Wadi Nahala, Wadi Nehaila or Wadi Nuhaila, is a dry valley or river with intermittent flow, which flows almost exclusively during the rainy season, located at the northeast of the United Arab Emirates, in the Emirate of Ras Al Khaimah.

It forms its own drainage basin, which has an approximate area of 38.84 km^{2} (15.00 mi^{2}), and is limited to the north and northeast by the Wadi Naqab hydrographic basin; to the east with the Wadi Kiriba; to the southeast with the Wadi Tawiyean basin; to the southwest with minor wadis that pour their waters into the great alluvial plain of Jiri plain, near the town of Khatt; and to the west with the same plain, into which it flows.

Almost all this hydrographic basin is in the Emirate of Ras Al Khaimah. Only a small portion of 0.77 km^{2} (0.30 mi^{2}) south of the basin belongs to the Emirate of Fujairah.

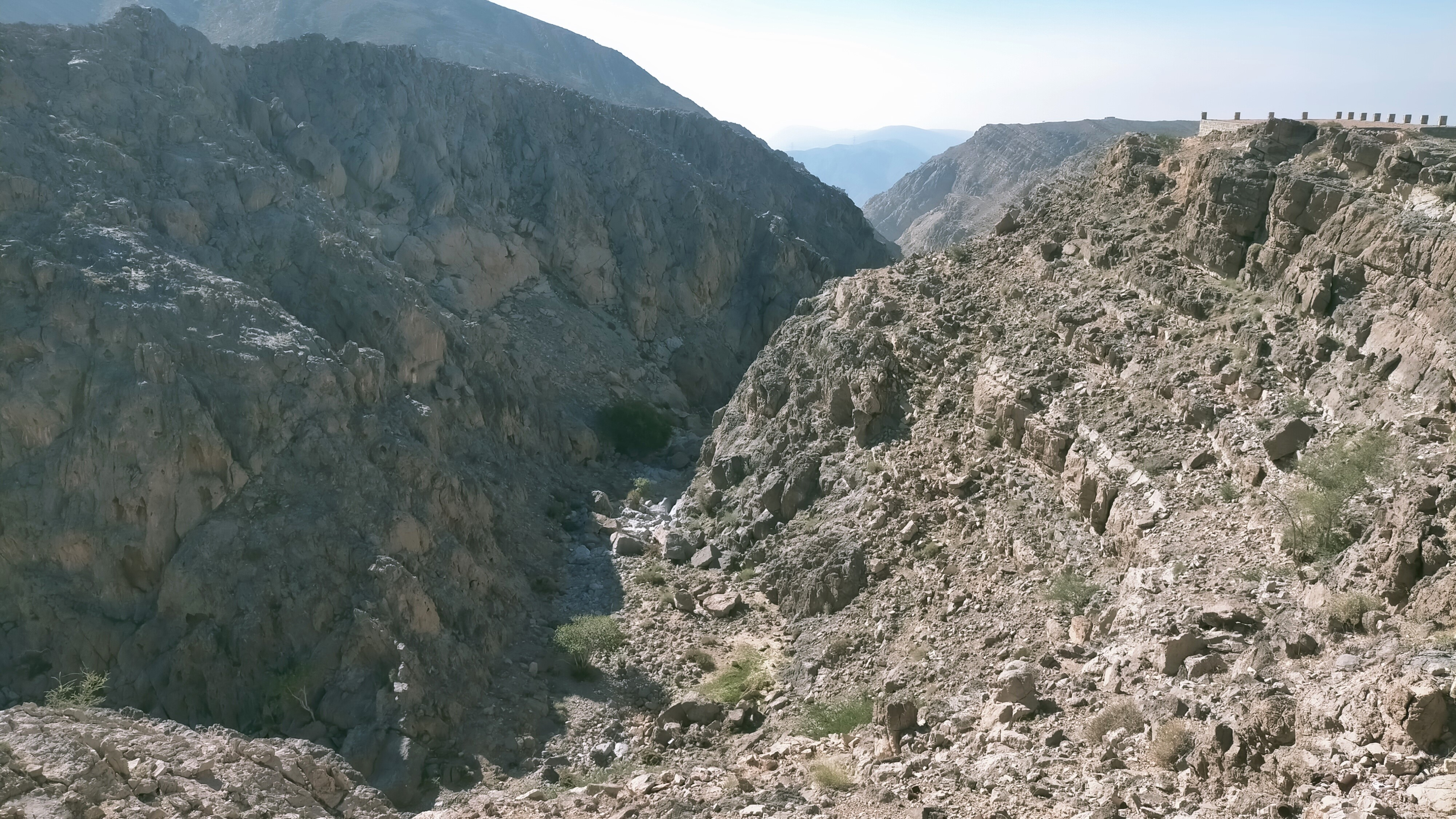
View of Wadi Baqal, a tributary of Wadi Nahela, as it passes through the town of Baqal

The highest point is located at the eastern end, at the top of Jabal Harf (1,420 m (4,660 ft)), on whose western slope the Wadi Baqal originates, and other important tributaries and sub-tributaries of the Wadi Nahela.

The most prominent towns in the Wadi Nahela watershed are Baqal and Tala, although there are other small villages and farms scattered around, most of them without permanent inhabitants.

== Course ==
The source of the main channel of the Wadi Nahela is located approximately at an altitude of 903 m (2,963 ft), at a point equidistant between Jabal Ash Sharaf 639 m (2,096 ft) and Aqbat Al Kibs 1,209 m (3,967 ft), very close to the line of territorial demarcation between the emirates of Emirate of Ras Al Khaimah and Fujaira, to the southeast of the drainage basin.

In the first kilometer and a half from its source, the Wadi Nahela has a very steep slope, typical of a torrent in its upper course, losing more than 500 m (1,600 ft) of elevation in that short interval.

From that point on, the wadi moderates its slope. It follows a layout typical of a middle course, receiving on the right the confluence of an important tributary that begins its course on the western slope of the Jabal Harf and the Wadi Baqal.

Seven hundred meters after the mouth of the Wadi Baqal, we can find on the left bank of the wadi the ruins of an older settlement, with the usual dry stone constructions, and almost at the end of the middle course, the confluence of a small tributary wadi, also on the right, very popular among hikers because its channel leads to an area with picturesque caves, known as Baqal Caves.

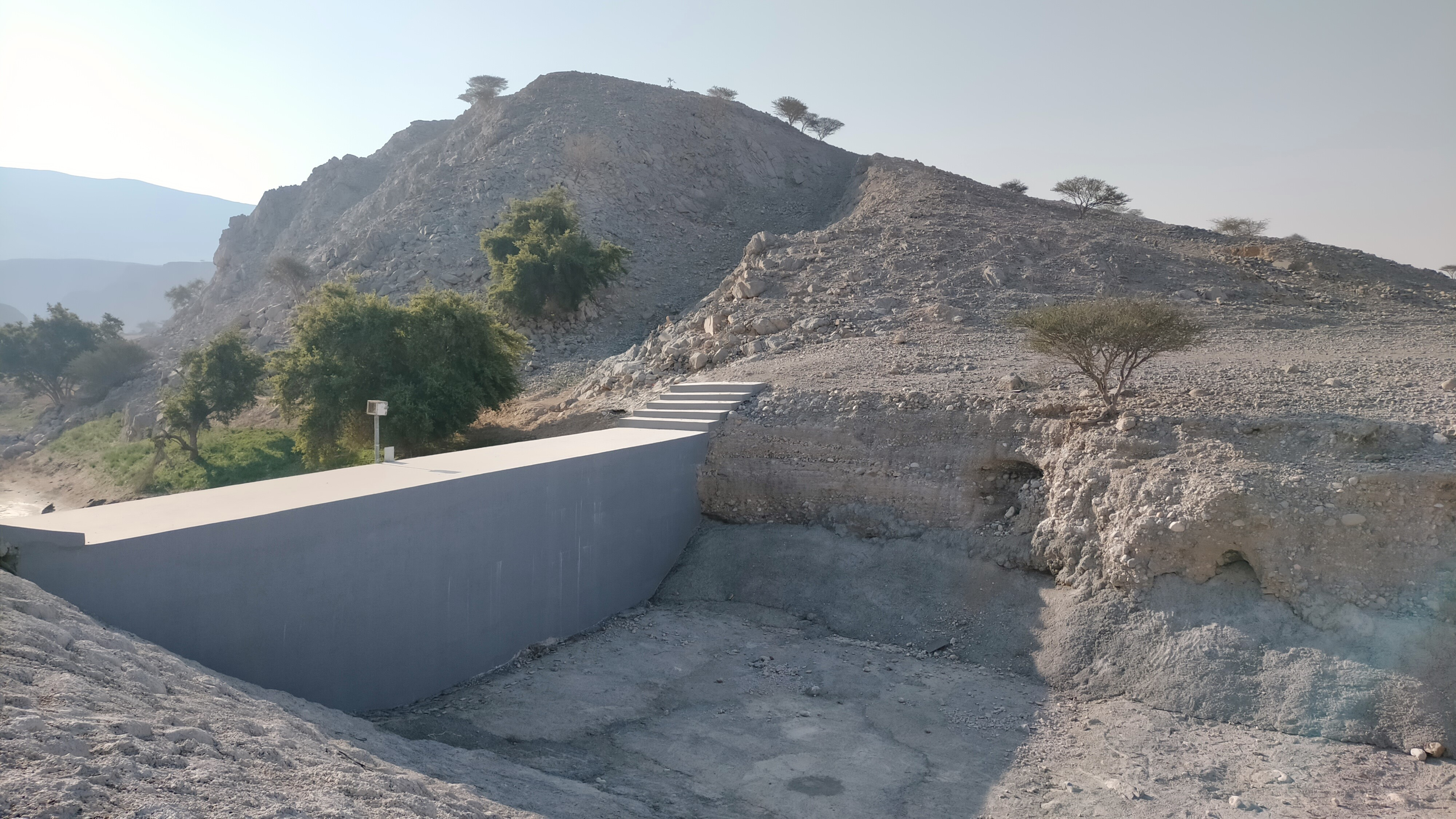
Wadi Nahela breaker, small dam built in 1986

At the beginning of the lower course of the Wadi Nahela, at the point where the current channel of the wadi turns towards the northwest, a small dam was built in 1986, intended to feed underground water resources and reduce damage from possible floods, which receives the name of Wadi Nahela Breaker (Arabic: حاجز وادي نحيله).

During the first kilometer and a half of the route, after the dam, the Wadi Nahela follows a well-defined channel with a bed of boulders and sides of sedimentary materials eroded by water. Afterward, the wadi channel loses definition and is progressively integrated into the Jiri plain, forming an alluvial fan. Its sides lose height, and sporadically, it widens considerably and divides into successive forks.

Each new bifurcation distributes the potential waters and the resulting arms lose flow and intensity, so the new channels also lose definition, making it very difficult to determine which is the main arm, especially because, as usually happens in other alluvial plains of similar morphology, over time, the wadi´s current can also wander between torrential rains and others, greatly altering the previous courses, which nevertheless maintain their mark on the plain.

Towards the middle of its lower course, shortly before its mouth, the Wadi Nahela receives on the left the confluence of two other important tributaries: the Wādī Diwе̄rah (identified on older maps as Wadi Duwaira) and the Wādī Al Mawārid (also known as Wadi Muwarid).

== Toponymy ==
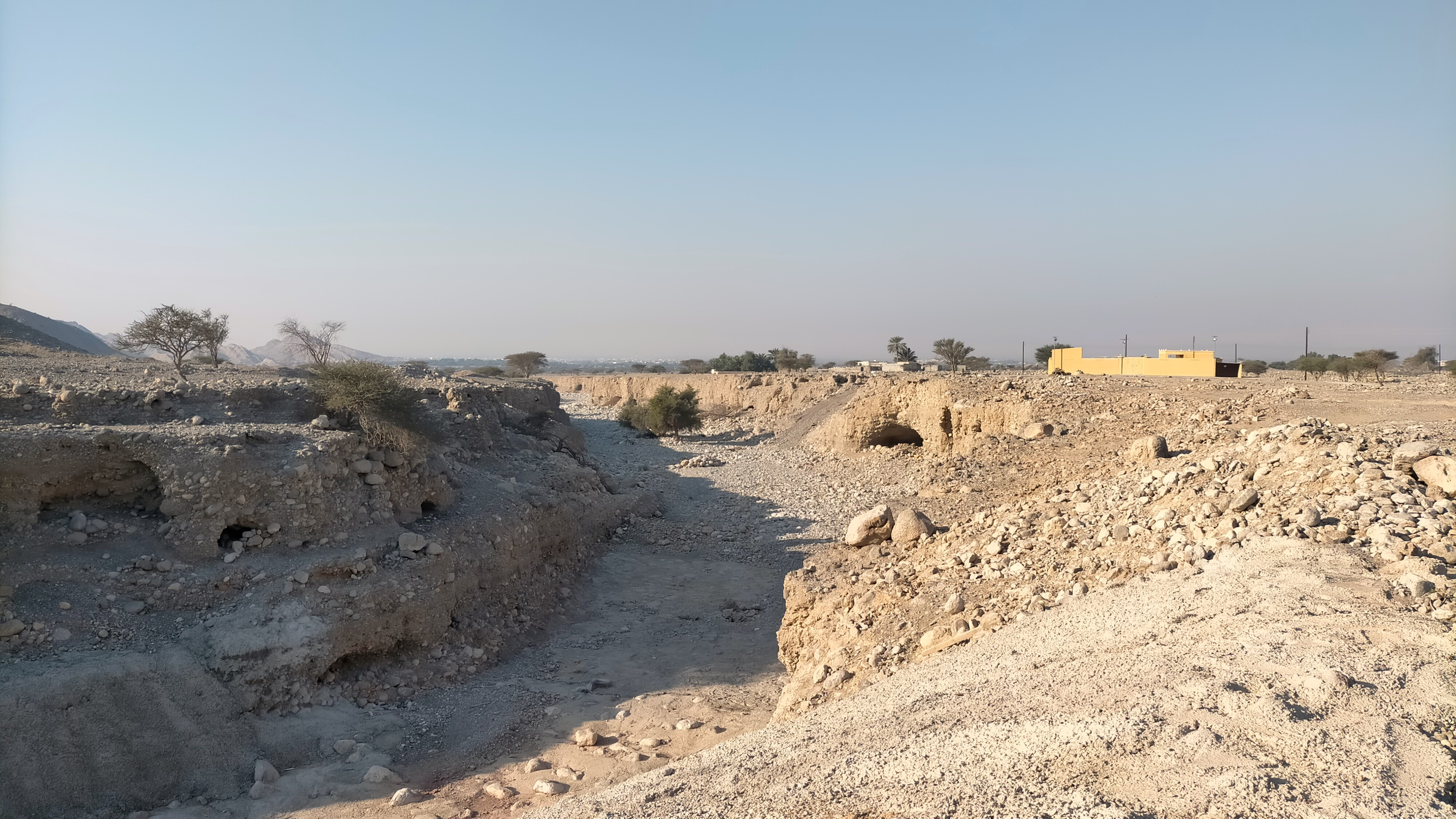
View of Wadi Nahela in its lower course, after the Wadi Nahela breaker

Alternative names: Wādī Ghēl, Wadi Ghil, Wadi Nahail, Wadi Nahala, Wadi Nehaila, Wadi Nuhaila, Wādī Nḥīlh.

In the National Atlas of the United Arab Emirates it appears with the spelling Wādī Ghēl.

The names of Wadi Nahela (spelled Wadi Nahail) and its tributary Wadi Baqal were recorded in the documentation and maps prepared between 1950 and 1960 by the British Arabist, cartographer, military officer and diplomat Julian F. Walker, during the work carried out to establish borders between the then so-called Trucial States, later completed by the United Kingdom Ministry of Defence, on 1:100,000 scale maps published in 1971.

== Population ==
The entire area near the Wadi Nahela and its tributaries was populated by the Habus tribe, distributed between the tribal areas of Bani Idaid, Banī Ḩasan and Banī Rayyil.

== See also ==
- List of wadis of the United Arab Emirates
- List of mountains in the United Arab Emirates
- List of wadis of Oman
- List of mountains in Oman
