= Wadi Tawiyean =

Wadi in UAE

Wadi Tawiyean Wādī Aṭ Ṭawyēn
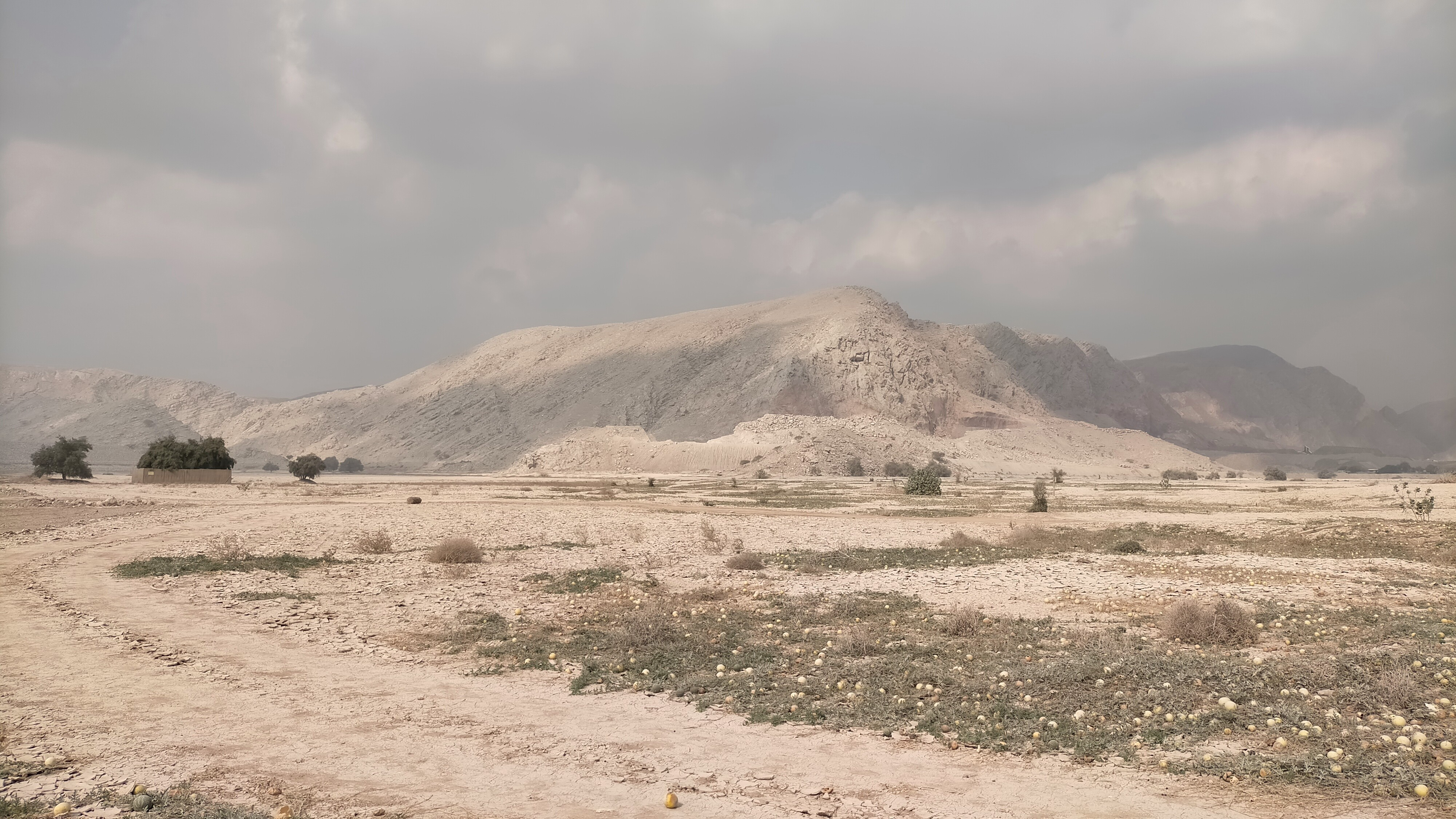

- Location within United Arab Emirates Location within Persian Gulf Location within West and Central Asia
- Native name: وادي الطويين (Arabic)

Location
- Country: United Arab Emirates
- Emirate: Fujairah

Physical characteristics
- Source: Southwest of the village of Hiyar, from its confluence with the Wadi al-Khurush.
  - elevation: 190 m (620 ft), approximately
- Mouth: Southwest of the Wadi Tawiyean Dam (Batha Mahani)
  - coordinates: 25°33′55″N 56°02′44″E
  - elevation: 146 m (479 ft)
- Length: 6.5 km (4.0 mi)
- Basin size: 208 km^{2} (80 mi^{2})

Basin features
- Progression: Wadi. Intermittent flow
- River system: Wadi Tawiyean.
- Tributaries
  - left: Wadi Sayraq
  - right: Wadi Khabb, Wadi Awsaq, Wadi al Khurush

Wadi Tawiyean (Arabic: وادي الطويين, romanized: Wādī Aṭ Ṭawyēn) is a valley, or dry river, with ephemeral or intermittent flow, which flows almost exclusively during the rainy season, located in the east of the United Arab Emirates, in the emirate of Fujairah.

It forms its own drainage basin of 208 km², which is bordered to the north by the Wadi Khabb Shamsi basins, Wadi Naqab and Wadi Nahela; and to the south and west by those of Wadi Mu'taridah / Wadi Mutarid and Wadi Basseirah.

The entire Wadi Tawiyean catchment area, whose highest peak is Jabal Yibir 1,527 m (5,010 ft), brings together approximately 222 independent streams, most of them without known name, all of them classified into five grades or levels according to the Horton-Strahler numbering.

Of these, the most significant in terms of length and flow is by far the Wadi Khabb (27 km (17 mi)), to the point that its course is sometimes mistakenly identified as the Wadi Tawiyean itself. Other important tributaries are the Wadi Awsaq, the Wadi al Khurush, and the Wadi Sayraq.

They all flow into the Wadi Tawiyean, in the Sayh Muruq depression. next to the city of Tawiyean (Arabic: الطويين, romanized: Aţ Ţawyēn).

Although the total approximate length of the Wadi Tawiyean is only 6.5 km (4.0 mi) (much smaller than several of its tributaries), the watershed gets its name from the wadi where the river mouth is concentrated.

== Course ==
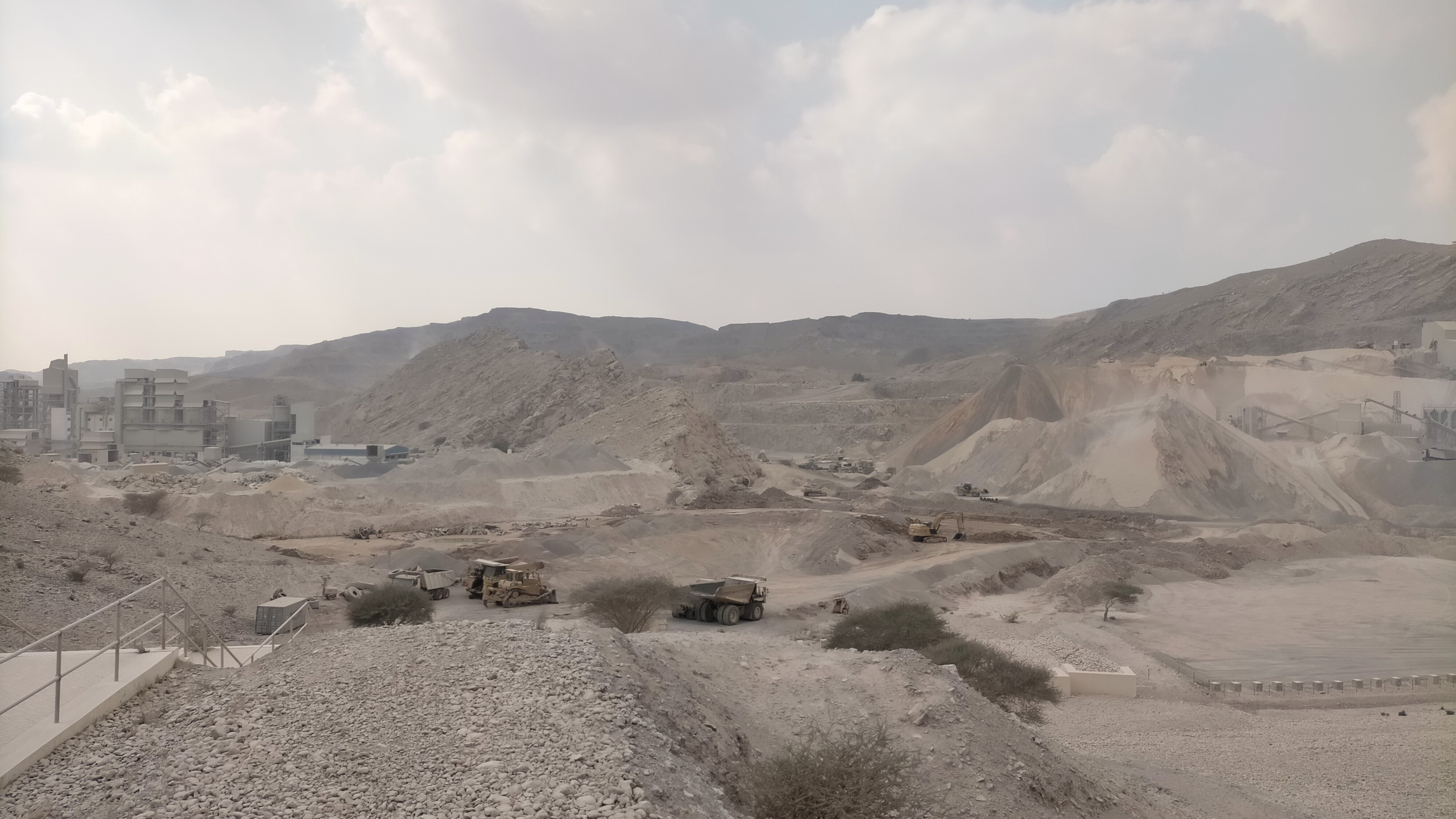
View of the mouth of the Wadi Tawiyean and the Batha Mahani area, from the Wadi Tawiyean Dam

The Wadi Tawiyean flows from west to east, from the confluence of the Wadi al Khurush, descending from the area of the historic Qaliddi Pass, and flows into the Batha Mahani, the flat, sandy bed of the Wadi Mahani, formed by the deposition of sediments.

The entire mouth of Wadi Tawiyean, and the Batha Mahani area west of the dam, is occupied by large-scale quarrying, which has affected the course of the wadi and caused considerable environmental impact on its surroundings.

== Dams and reservoirs ==
As in other regions of the UAE, the Wadi Tawiyean geographical area has occasionally been affected by unusually heavy rains and flooding.

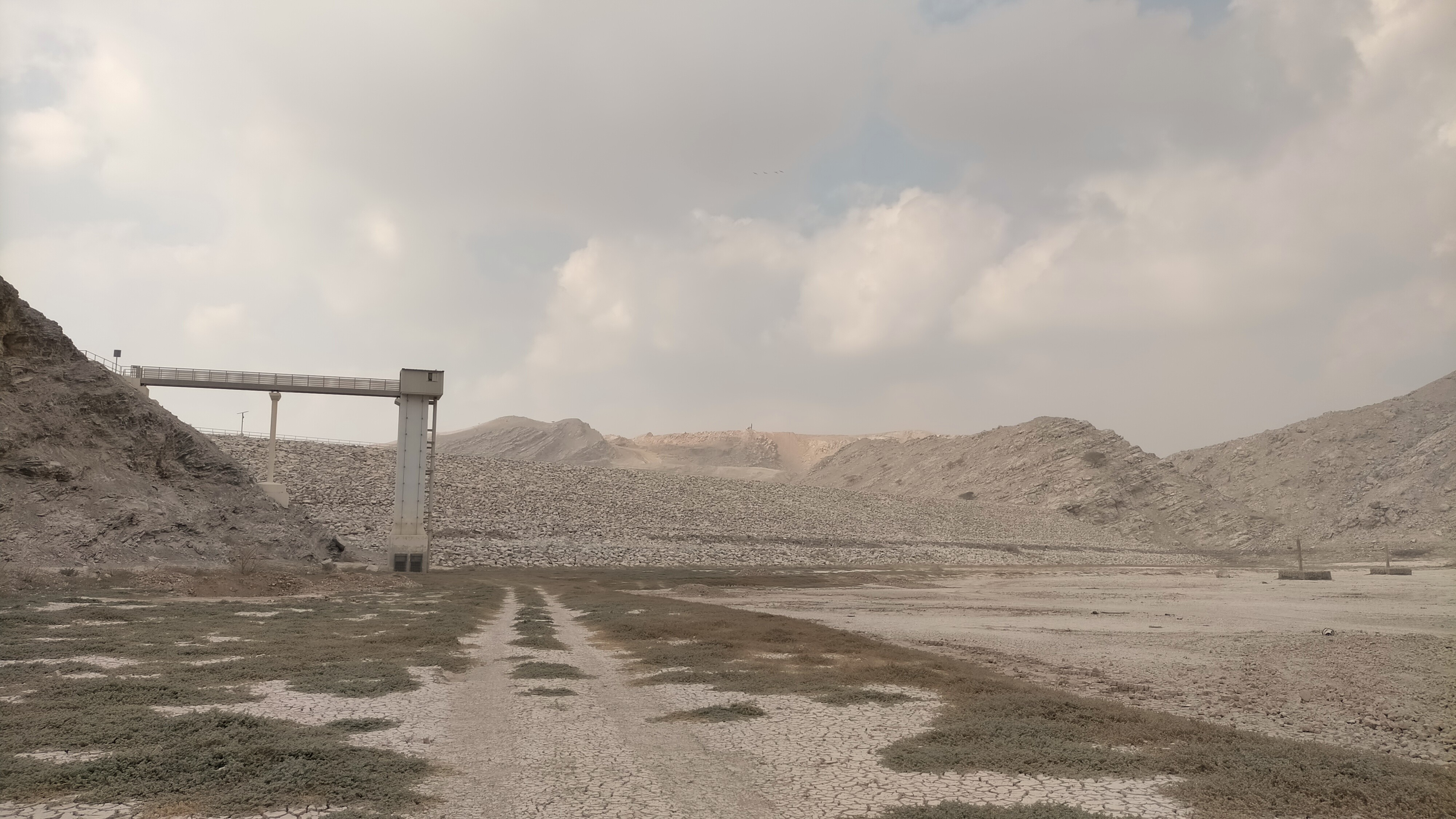
Wadi Tawiyean Dam

To prevent the danger of flash floods and increase the recharge potential of groundwater, a large dam was built along its course in 1992, taking advantage of the confluence of its major tributaries in the Sayh Muruq depression.

The dam is 23.5 m (77 ft) high, has a reservoir of 3.75 km^{2} (1.45 mi^{2}) with a capacity of 18.5 million cubic metres, and was officially named Wadi Tawiyean Dam (coordinates: 25°33′57″N, 56°2′56″E).

== Toponymy ==
Alternative names: Wadi Tawiyean, Wadi Al Tawiyeen, Wādī Aṭ Ṭawyēn, Wadi Tawiyeen, Wadi Tawiyayn, Wādī Ţawīyayn, Wadi Tawiyain.

The name of Wadi Tawiyean (spelled as Wādī Ţawīyayn and Wadi Tawiyain), its tributaries, mountains and nearby towns, was recorded in the documentation and maps drawn up between 1950 and 1960 by the British Arabist, cartographer, military officer and diplomat Julian F. Walker, during the work carried out to establish the borders between the then called Trucial States, later completed by the Ministry of Defence of the United Kingdom, on scale maps 1:100,000 published in 1971.

In the National Atlas of the United Arab Emirates it appears with the spelling Wādī Aṭ Ṭawyēn (Arabic: وادي الطويين).

== Population ==
The Wadi Tawiyean area was populated mainly by the Sharqiyin tribe, sections or tribal zones of Hafaitat / Ḩufaitāt and Jamahi / Jamaḩah.

Throughout the Wadi Tawiyean watershed and its tributaries, archaeological remains exist that attest to human presence in this area since very ancient times.

== See also ==
- List of wadis of the United Arab Emirates
- List of mountains in the United Arab Emirates
- List of wadis of Oman
- List of mountains in Oman
