= Wadi Al Hayilah =

Wadi in UAE

Wadi Al Hayilah Wādī Al Hayīlah
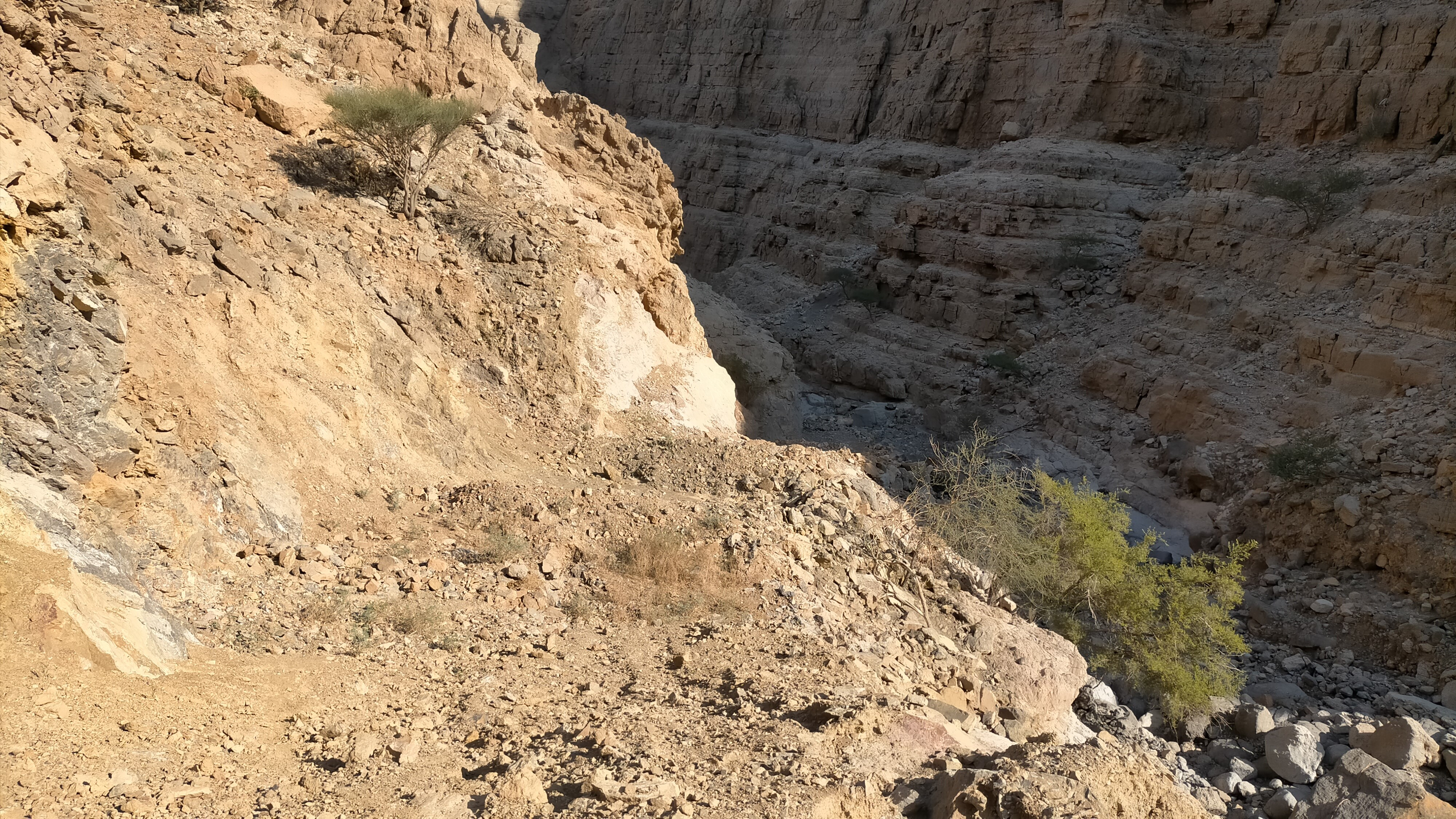
- Wadi Al Hayilah, tributary of Wadi Bih. Middle course

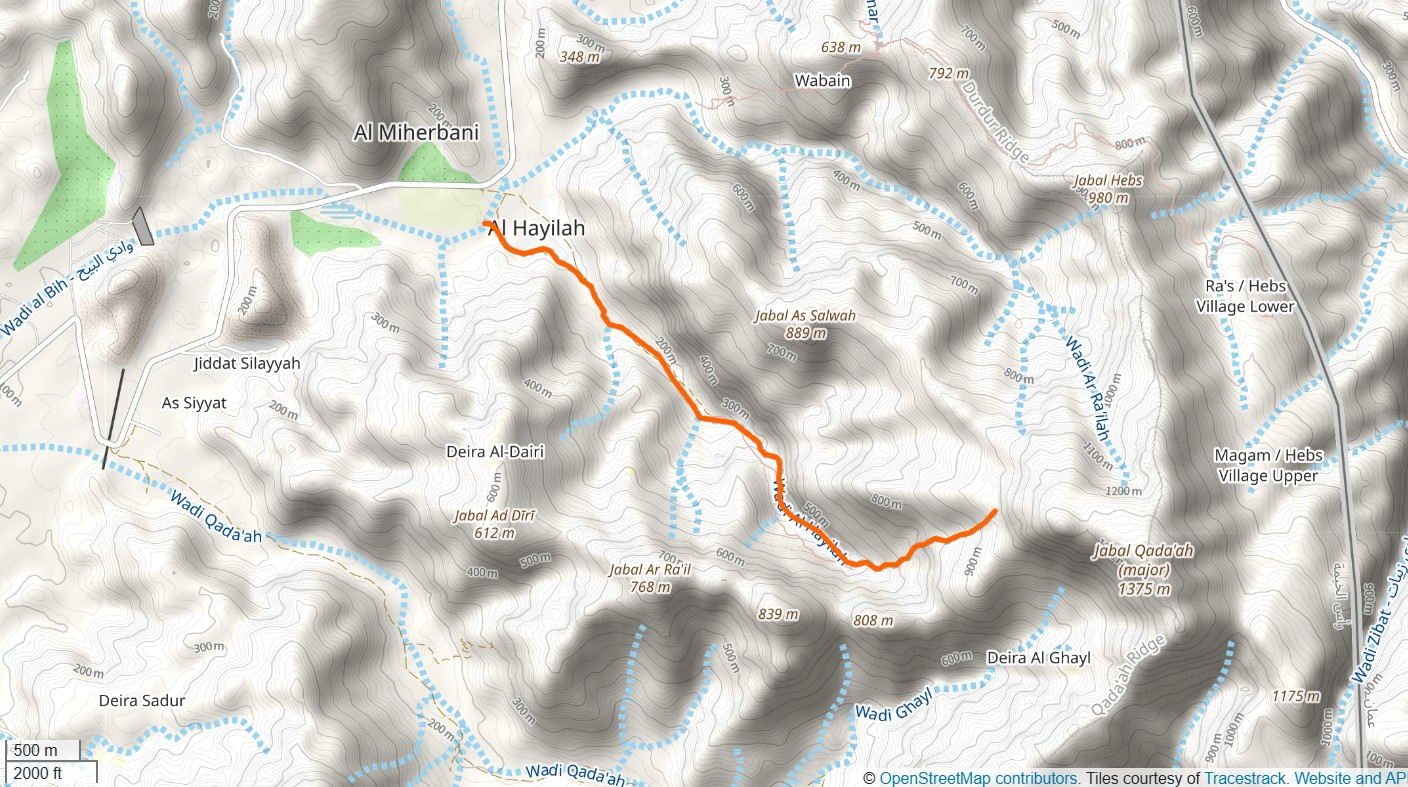
- Location and course of Wadi Al Hayilah

- Location within United Arab Emirates Location within Persian Gulf Location within West and Central Asia
- Native name: وادي الحييله (Arabic)

Location
- Country: United Arab Emirates
- Emirate: Ras Al Khaimah

Physical characteristics
- Source: On the western slope of the Jabal Qada'ah
  - elevation: 971 m (3,186 ft), approximately
- Mouth: In the Wadi Bih
  - coordinates: 25°47′54″N 56°05′57″E
  - elevation: 127 m (417 ft)
- Length: 4.7 km (2.9 mi)
- Basin size: 6.5 km^{2} (2.5 mi^{2}) (subbasin)

Basin features
- Progression: Wadi. Intermittent flow
- River system: Wadi Bih

Wadi Al Hayilah (Arabic: وادي الحييله, romanized: Wādī Al Hayīlah) is a valley or dry river with ephemeral or intermittent flow, flowing mainly during the rainy season, located in the emirate of Ras Al Khaimah, in the eastern United Arab Emirates.

It forms a small sub-basin of 6.5 km^{2} (2.5 mi^{2}) belonging to the Wadi Bih drainage basin, which as a whole covers a large drainage area, with a surface area between 460 km^{2} (180 mi^{2}) and 483 km^{2} (186 mi^{2}), divided between the territory of the UAE and Oman (approximately 172 km^{2} (66 mi^{2}) in the UAE and 298 km^{2} (115 mi^{2}) in Oman), and whose highest peak is Jabal Al Harim (2,087 m (6,847 ft)).

This sub-basin is bordered to the north and east by the Wadi Ar Ra'ilah; to the south by the Wadi Qada'ah; and to the west by the main course of Wadi Bih.

== Course ==
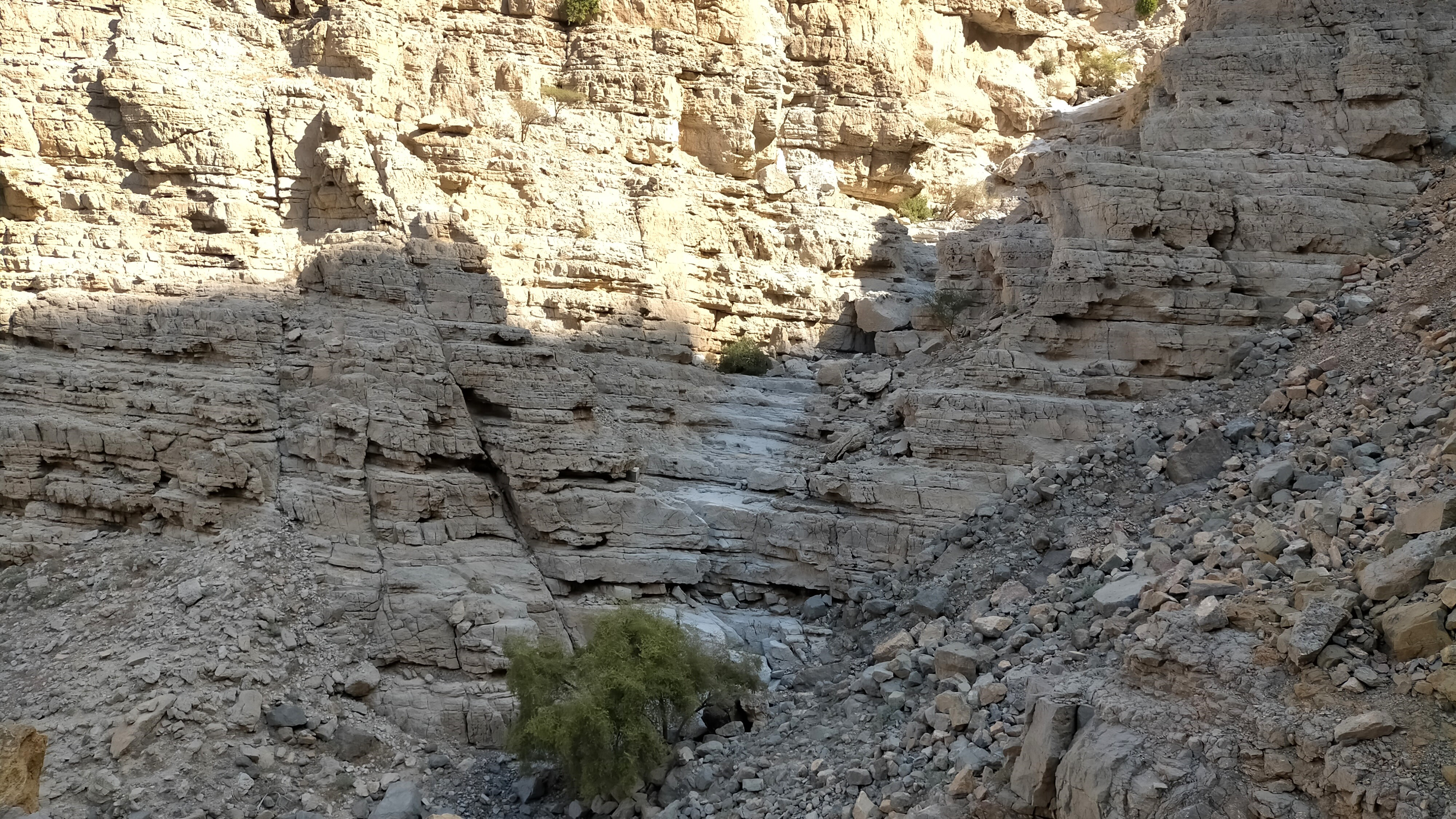
Dry waterfalls in the upper course of Wadi Al Hayilah

Wadi Al Hayilah flows from southeast to northwest and has a total length of approximately 4.7 km (2.9 mi).

Its main source is located at an altitude of approximately 971 m (3,186 ft) above sea level, on the western slope of Jabal Qada'ah (minor), a secondary summit of the main peak, located 600 m (2,000 ft) away.

In its upper reaches, Wadi Al Hayilah descends with a considerable gradient, forming spectacular dry cascades in some places.

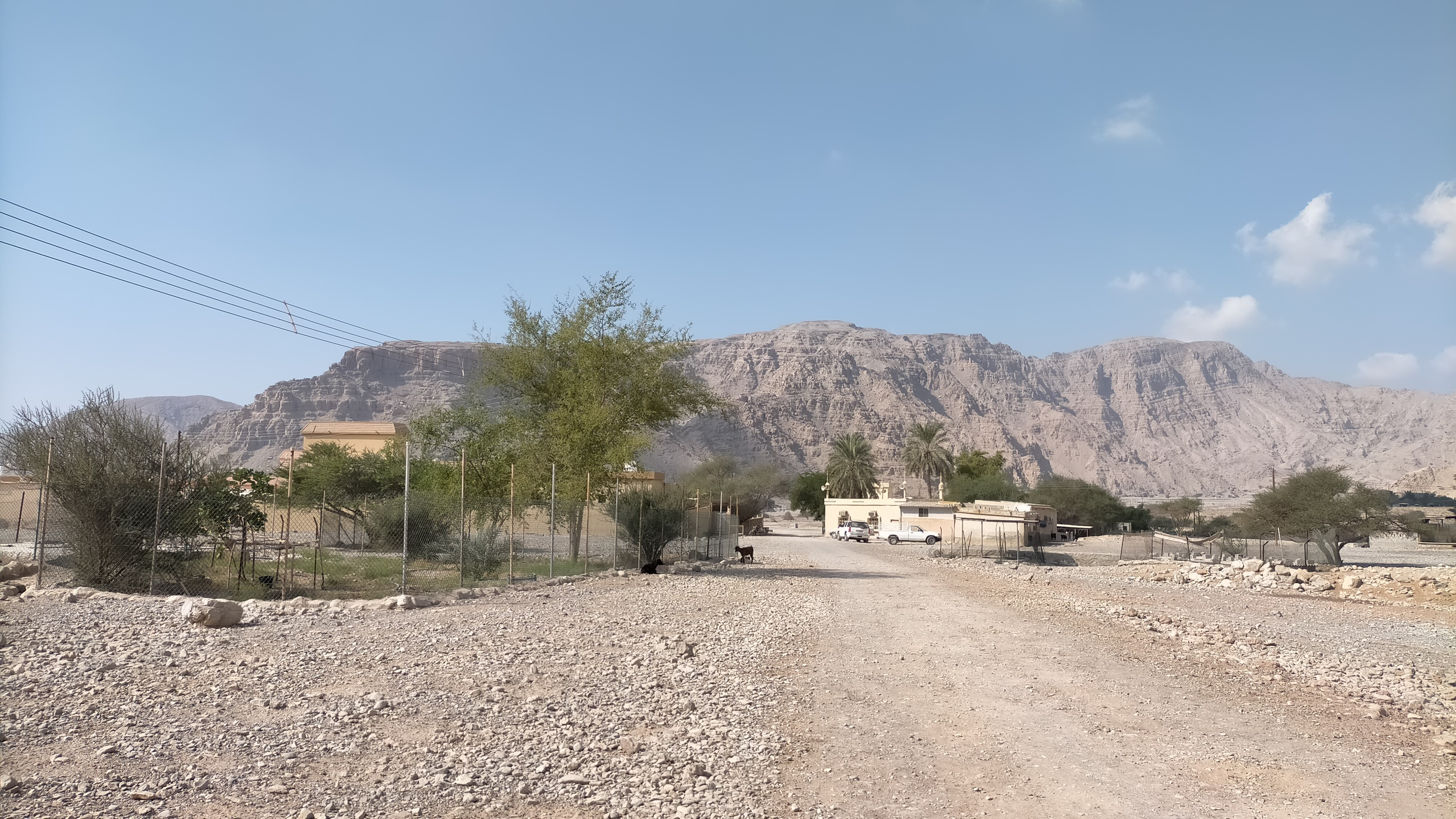
Village of Al Hayilah, at the mouth of Wadi Al Hayilah

In its middle and lower reaches, there are some small farms and cultivated terraces, and almost at the mouth is the village of Al Hayilah (Arabic: الحييله), bordered by formidable cliffs or large rock faces that reach 500 m (1,600 ft) in height and attract the interest of climbers.

== Dams and Reservoirs ==
Like other regions of the UAE, the Wadi Al Hayilah area has occasionally been affected by unusually heavy rainfall and flooding, but so far no dams have been built on its channel.

== Toponymy ==
Alternative names: Wadi Al Hayilah, Wadi Hijailah, Wadi Hijaila, Wadi Al Hila, Wadi Hila.

The name of Wadi Al Hayilah (spelled Wadi Hiyaila), its tributaries, mountains and nearby towns was recorded in the documentation and maps produced between 1950 and 1960 by the British Arabist, cartographer, military officer and diplomat Julian F. Walker, during the work carried out to establish the borders between the then called Trucial States, later completed by the UK Ministry of Defence, with 1:100,000 scale maps published from 1971 onwards.

In the National Atlas of the United Arab Emirates it appears as Wādī Al Hayīlah (Arabic: وادي الحييله).

== Population ==
The area near Wadi Al Hayilah was populated mainly by the Habus tribe, and corresponded to the Banī Sā‘ad tribal area.

== See also ==
- List of wadis of the United Arab Emirates
- List of mountains in the United Arab Emirates
- List of wadis of Oman
- List of mountains in Oman
