= Jabal Qada'ah =

Mountain in the UAE

- Jabal Kidā'ah
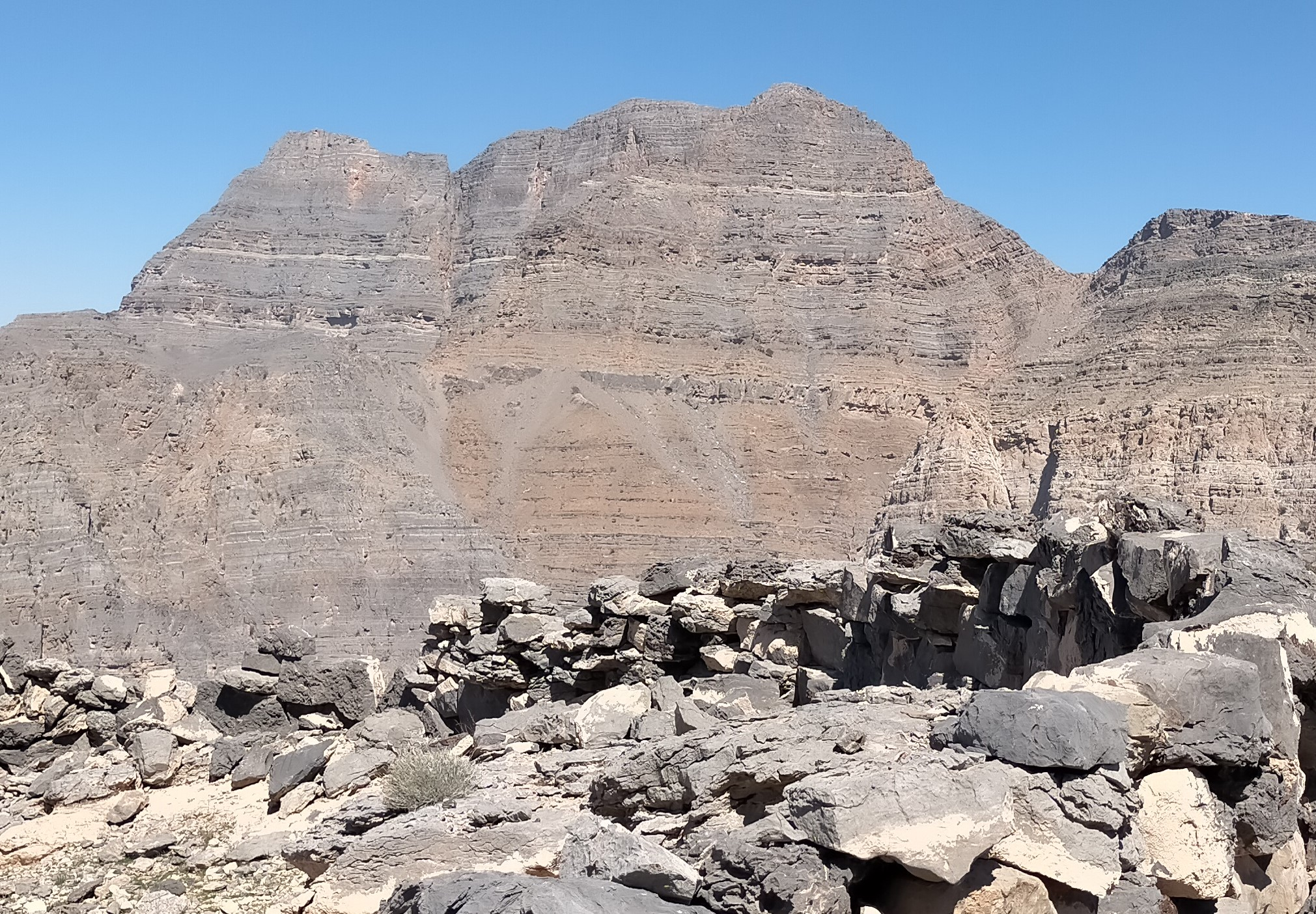
- Southern slope of Jabal Qada'ah, also called Jabal Al Ahqab, seen from the village of Qada'ah

Highest point
- Elevation: 1,375 m (4,511 ft)
- Prominence: 460 m (1,510 ft)
- Isolation: 4.36 km (2.71 mi)
- Coordinates: 25°46′40.8″N 56°08′31.7″E

Naming
- Native name: جبل قداعة (Arabic)

Geography
- Location within United Arab Emirates Location within Persian Gulf Location within West and Central Asia
- Country: United Arab Emirates
- Emirate: Ras Al Khaimah
- Parent range: Hajar Mountains

Jabal Qada'ah (Arabic: جبل قداعة, romanized: Jabal Kidā'ah), also known as Jabal Al Aḩqab, is a mountain located in the Hajar Mountains range, northeast of the United Arab Emirates, in the Emirate of Ras Al Khaimah.

Its summit has an altitude of 1,375 m (4,511 ft), a significant prominence of 460 m (1,510 ft) and a topographic isolation of 4.36 km (2.71 mi), so the elongated and solitary silhouette of the mountain, in the form of a plateau, stands out and is perfectly visible even from a long distance.

== Geography ==
The Jabal Qada'ah forms a ridge line that extends in three directions:

- Towards the northwest, with an important subsummit or subpeak of 1,345 m (4,413 ft), with only 45 m (148 ft) of prominence, located 600 m (2,000 ft) away from the main summit, which on some maps is referenced with the name of Jabal Qada'ah (minor). This ridge line then continues to the south and east, with the peaks of Jabal Ar Ra'il (768 m (2,520 ft)), Jabal Ad Diri (612 m (2,008 ft)) and other smaller ones, forming part of the northern flank of the drainage divide of Wadi Qada'ah.
- Towards the southeast, the ridge descends to Wadi Qada'ah, near the village of Mak Sikek, one of the most active in the area, located on the banks of the wadi bed.
- And to the north, it extends towards the summit of Jabal Hebs / Jabal Hibs (980 m (3,220 ft)), forming the eastern flank of the Wadi Ar Ra'ilah sub-basin; west of the villages of Magam and Ra's, located on the eastern slope of Jabal Hebs, popularly known as Deira Al-Hebsi or Deira Al-Habsi, as they were the first settlements of the Habus tribe in this bordering area between the Shihuh tribal areas (who occupied the areas north of Wadi Bih), and the Habus tribal areas that settled at the south of the wadi, including the Habus tribal area of Banī Sā'ad, to which these populations belonged.

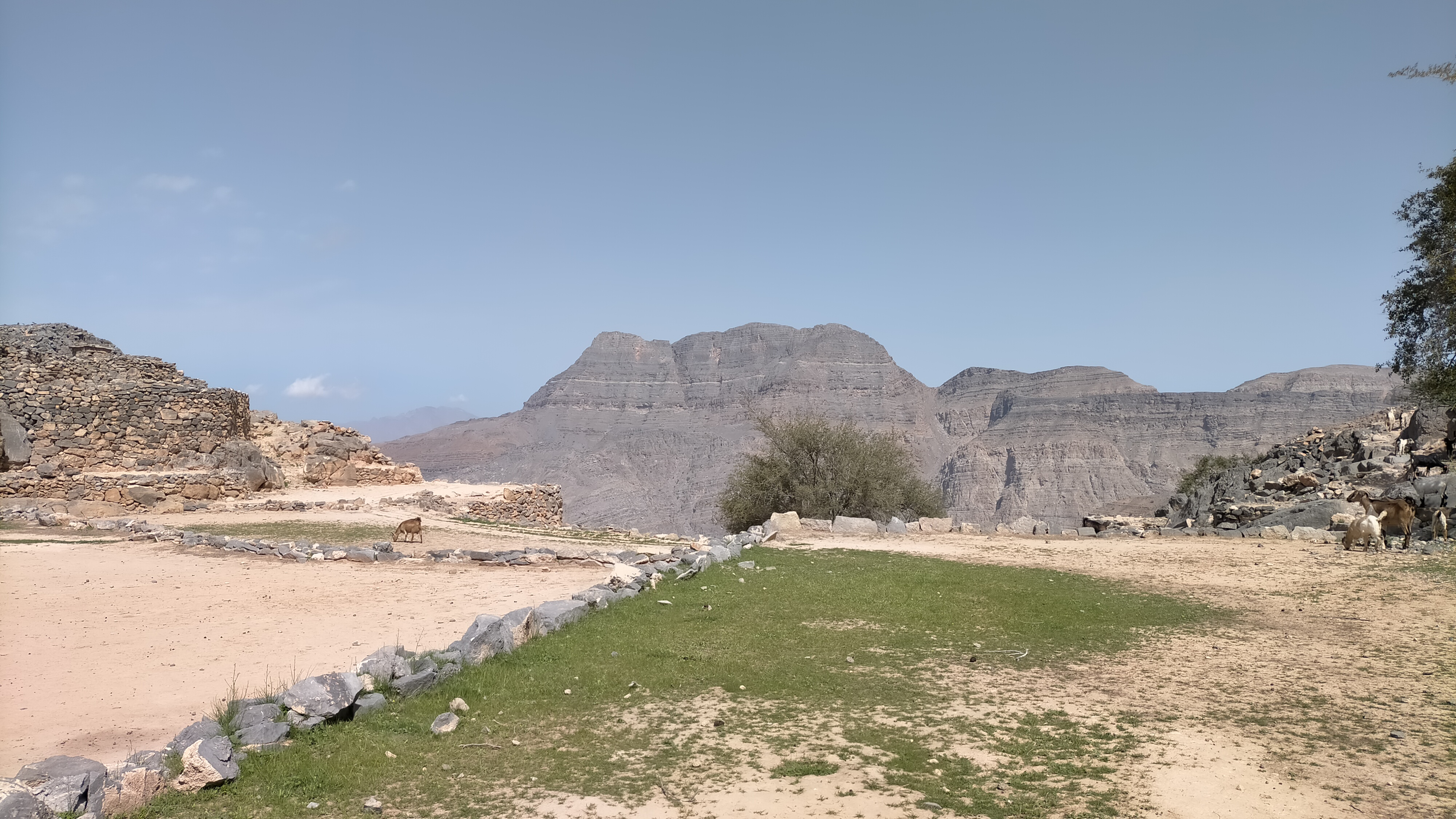
Southern slope of Jabal Qada'ah, also called Jabal Al Ahqab. View from Silay Al Khatami

== Climbing ==
There are different routes to ascend to the top of Jabal Qada'ah starting from the west and southwest, and partially using the channels of the Wādī Ar Ra'ilah or the Wadi Al Hayilah / Wadi Hiyailah (both tributaries of the Wadi Bih), and also from the Wadi Ghail (a tributary of the Wadi Qada'ah). None of them are easy, nor can they be considered conventional roads or paths, since to a greater or lesser extent they require the use of climbing techniques and equipment or materials.

The most accessible and conventional route starts from the Wadi Bih (either from the village of Atmar, initially following the Wadi Atmar), or from the mouth of the Wādī Ar Ra'ilah (sometimes mistakenly called Wadi Haqab). This route follows a donkey path in excellent condition, which is usually used as an access route to the aforementioned villages of Ra's and Magam (Deira Al-Hebsi), and continues south until reaching the col or mountain pass of Jabal Qada'ah East Col (1,120 m (3,670 ft)), located 720 m (2,360 ft) southeast of the main summit.

At that point, a short climb of moderate difficulty and without relevant exposure sections begins, until reaching the top of Jabal Qada'ah, where there are ruins of old dry stone constructions, a cairn and remains of a small weather station.

== Toponymy ==
Alternative names: Jabal Kida'ah, Jabal Qida'a, Jabal Qada`a, Jabal Qada`ah, Jabal Qadda`a, Jabal Quda', Jabal Al Ahqab, Jebel Al Ahqab, 'Jabal Al Aḩqab.

The name of Jabal Qada'ah (with the spelling Jabal Qada'a) appears recorded in the documents and maps prepared between 1950 and 1960 by the British Arabist, cartographer, military officer and diplomat Julian F. Walker, on the occasion of the work carried out for the establishment of the borders between the then so-called Trucial States, later completed by the Ministry of Defense of the United Kingdom, with maps at a scale of 1:100,000 published in 1971, and in other previous maps and documents kept in the Archives UK nationals.

In the National Atlas of the United Arab Emirates, it is referenced with the spelling Jabal Al Aḩqab.

== Population ==
From approximately the beginning of the 19th century, the entire area near Jabal Qada'ah was populated by the Habus tribe, divided mainly between the tribal areas of Banī Huraymish and Banī Sā‘ad.

== See also ==
- List of mountains in the United Arab Emirates
- List of wadis of the United Arab Emirates
- List of mountains in Oman
- List of wadis in Oman
