= Qada'ah =

Village in the UAE

Qada'ah ديرة الكداءة (Arabic)
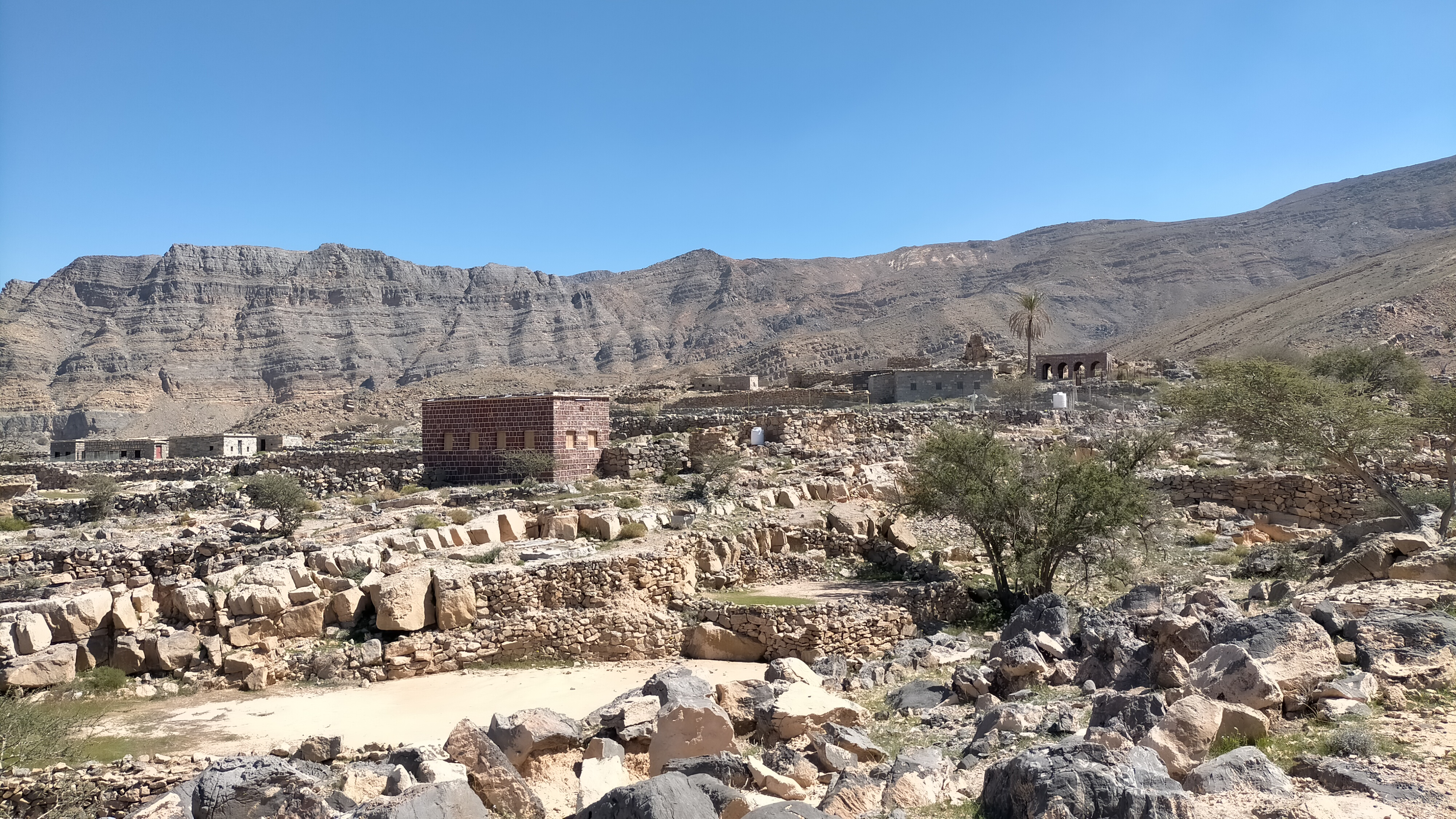
- Qada'ah. Village located in the mountains of Ras Al Khaimah (UAE), south of Jabal Qada'ah.

- Location within United Arab Emirates Location within Persian Gulf Location within West and Central Asia
- Coordinates: 25°45′01.58″N 56°08′47.29″E
- Country: United Arab Emirates
- Emirate: Ras Al Khaimah

Area
  - Total: 0.25 km^{2} (0.097 sq mi)
- Elevation: 870 m (2,850 ft)
- Time zone: UTC+04:00

Qada'ah (Arabic: ديرة الكداءة, romanized: Kidā'ah) is a small agricultural and livestock village, located in the northeast of the United Arab Emirates (UAE), in the Hajar Mountains, Emirate of Ras Al Khaimah, at an approximate altitude of 870 m (2,850 ft), and just over a kilometer from the border with the neighboring Sultanate of Oman.

The village has about 20 houses, some of them rebuilt and renovated following a traditional style; embankments and terraces supported by dry stone walls, without mortar, which allow water and soil to be retained, intended for cereal planting and other agricultural uses; pipes to collect runoff water; cisterns; sheepfolds; barns and other buildings. Most habitable homes are used as second homes by their owners.

Access to Qada'ah is only possible on foot or with donkeys, generally using a rocky and steep donkey path that starts from the village of Danam, located west-northwest of Qada'ah, on the banks of the Wadi Qada'ah.

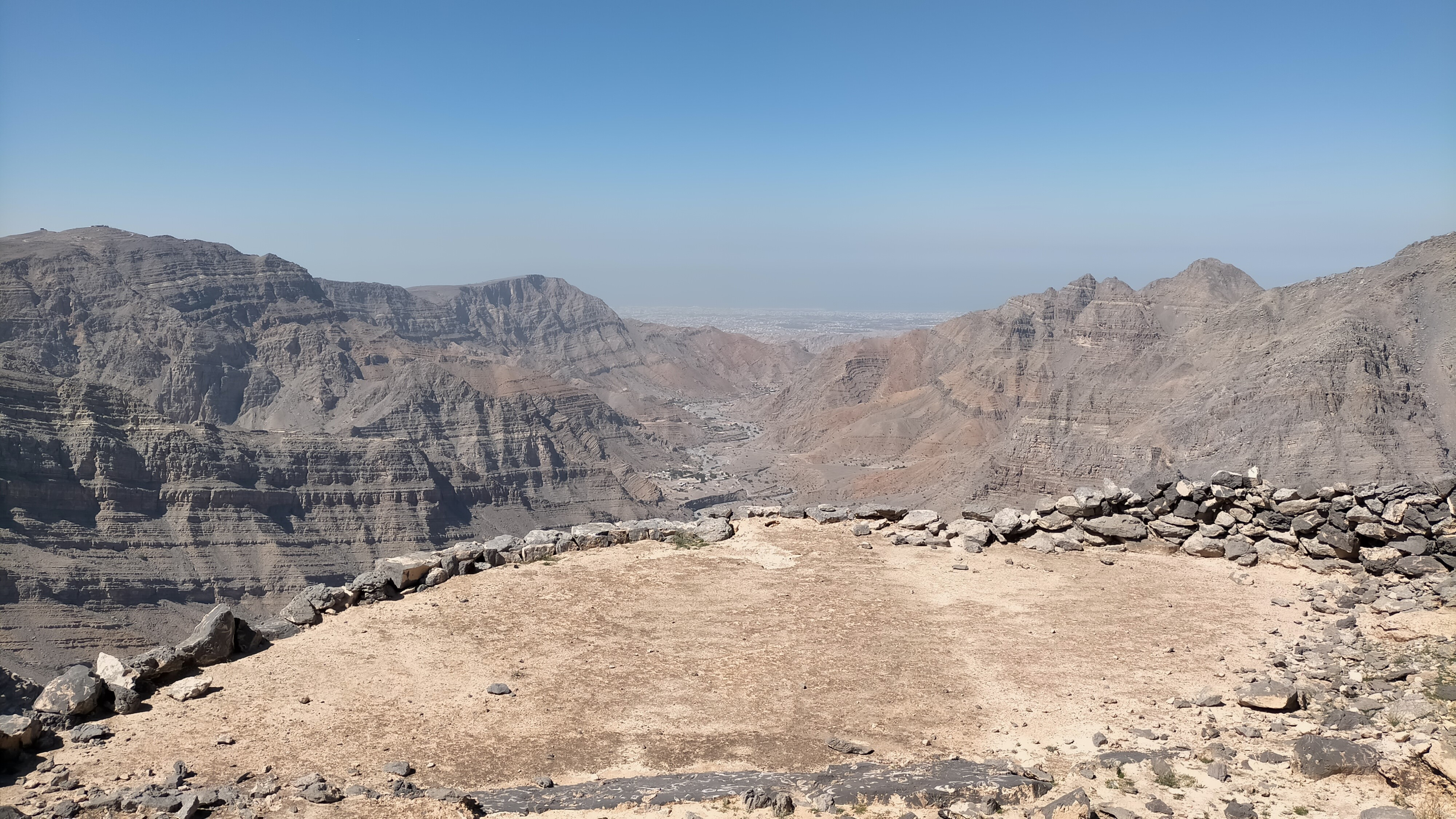
View of Wadi Qada'ah, from the village of Qada'ah

The small plateau, on which the town of Qada'ah extends, constitutes a formidable watchtower from which one can observe, to the west, a good part of the middle and lower reaches of the Wadi Qada'ah and even the coast of the Persian Gulf; to the north, the southern slope of Jabal Al Ahqab (Jabal Qada'ah); and to the east some sectors of the upper course of the Wadi Qada'ah and the cliffs and mountain ridge that serve as a reference for the border limit with Oman.

== Toponymy ==
Alternative names: Kida'ah, Kidā'ah, Qada`ah, Qadda`a, Qada‘a, Qada‘ah, Qadda‘a, Deira Al-Qada'ah, Deira Al-Quda, Deira Al-Kidā'ah.

While the position and course of the Wadi Qada'ah are relatively well defined on historical maps, especially that published by the United Kingdom Ministry of Defense in 1971, the exact location of the village of Qada 'ah is not sufficiently specified, neither in the main geographical databases, nor in the maps drawn by hand, between 1950 and 1960, by the British Arabist, cartographer, military officer and diplomat Julian F. Walker, during the work carried out for the establishment of borders between the then called Trucial States, nor in other maps published at the same time.

In all of them there is a reference to a town with the name of Qada'ah, located in the Wadi Qada'ah, but the coordinates of its location are not provided, and its position is erratic, sometimes appearing as a cultivation area located in the lower course of the wadi (on the northern slope of Jabal Sall), and in others it appears outlined in its middle course (approximately where the current village of Mak Sikek is located).

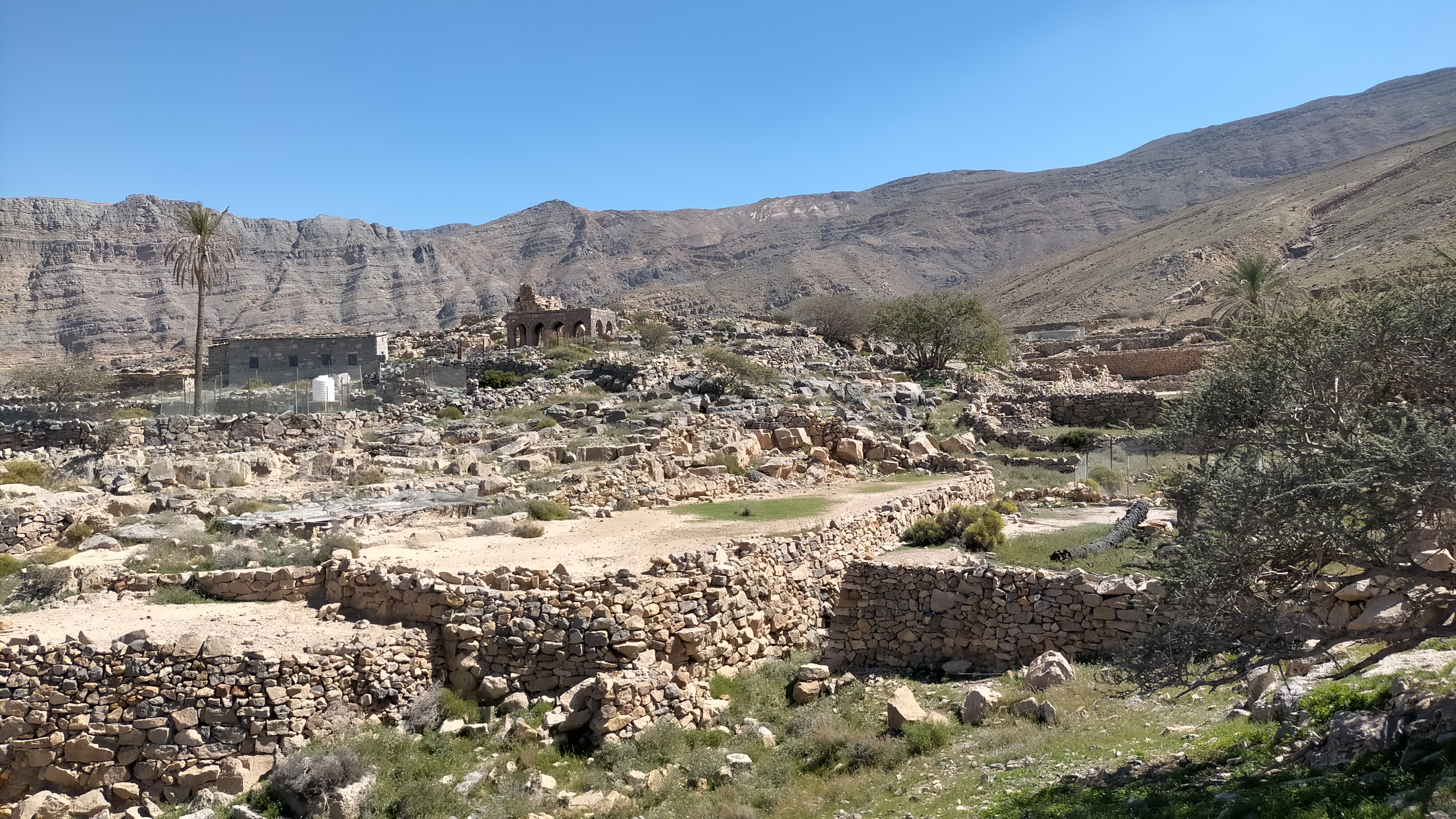
Old and new constructions, in Qada'ah

The difficulties that may have arisen in the past for cartographers in determining the exact position of the town are perfectly understandable, since Qada'ah is located at the head of the wadi, in an area that is difficult to access. On the other hand, as is customary in almost all wadis of the UAE, the reference toponym has been and continues to be generally that of the wadi itself, and all the villages, towns, small scattered farms, or farming areas in the area, are They are usually identified with the same name, common to all of them.

However, in the maps prepared between 1986 and 1991 by the Military Survey, Abu Dhabi, which were used in 1993 for the publication of "The national atlas of the United Arab Emirates", the coordinates of the village of Qada'ah were established at the position 25°45′N, 56°08′E, and its name was recorded with the spelling Kidā'ah, which corresponds to the way it is pronounced, according to its native inhabitants.

== Population ==
The entire area near Qada'ah was populated by the Habus tribe, and corresponded mainly to the Banī Huraymish tribal area.

== See also ==
- List of wadis of the United Arab Emirates
- List of mountains in the United Arab Emirates
- List of wadis of Oman
- List of mountains in Oman
