= Silay Al Khatami =

Village in the UAE

Silay Al Khatami سالي الخثامي (Arabic)
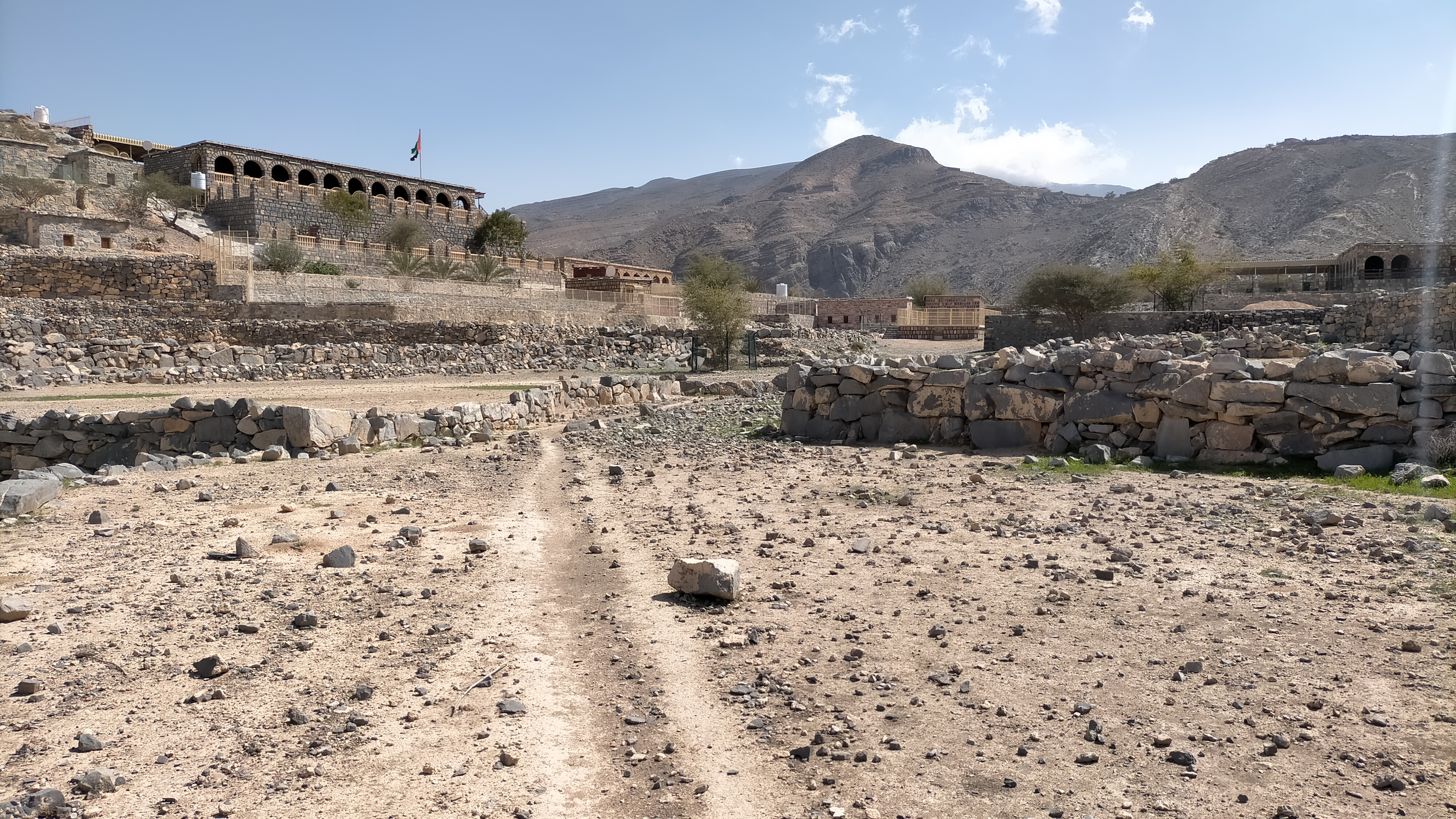
- Silay Al Khatami. Village located in the mountains of Ras Al Khaimah (UAE), south of Wadi Qada'ah and north of Wadi Naqab

- Location within United Arab Emirates Location within Persian Gulf Location within Middle East Location within West and Central Asia
- Coordinates: 25°41′22″N 56°05′18″E
- Country: United Arab Emirates
- Emirate: Ras Al Khaimah

Area
  - Total: 0.20 km^{2} (0.077 sq mi)
- Elevation: 890 m (2,920 ft)
- Time zone: UTC+04:00

Silay Al Khatami (Arabic: سالي الخثامي, romanized: Silay Al Khatamī) is a small agricultural and livestock village, located in the northeast of the United Arab Emirates (UAE), in the Hajar Mountains, Emirate of Ras Al Khaimah.

The town has about 30 houses, many of them rebuilt and renovated following a traditional style, stone huts and cabins; terraces supported by dry stone walls, without mortar, which allow water and soil to be retained, intended for pastures and other agricultural uses; gutters to collect runoff water; cisterns; sheepfolds; and other constructions. The existence of several small cemeteries also draws a lot of attention.

In recent years, a dirt track of almost 4 km (2.5 mi) was built, allowing access to the town by all-terrain vehicle, from the Wadi Qada'ah, which has greatly facilitated supplies and allowed the rapid development of the town, currently used as a second residence for some of its inhabitants.

== Toponymy ==
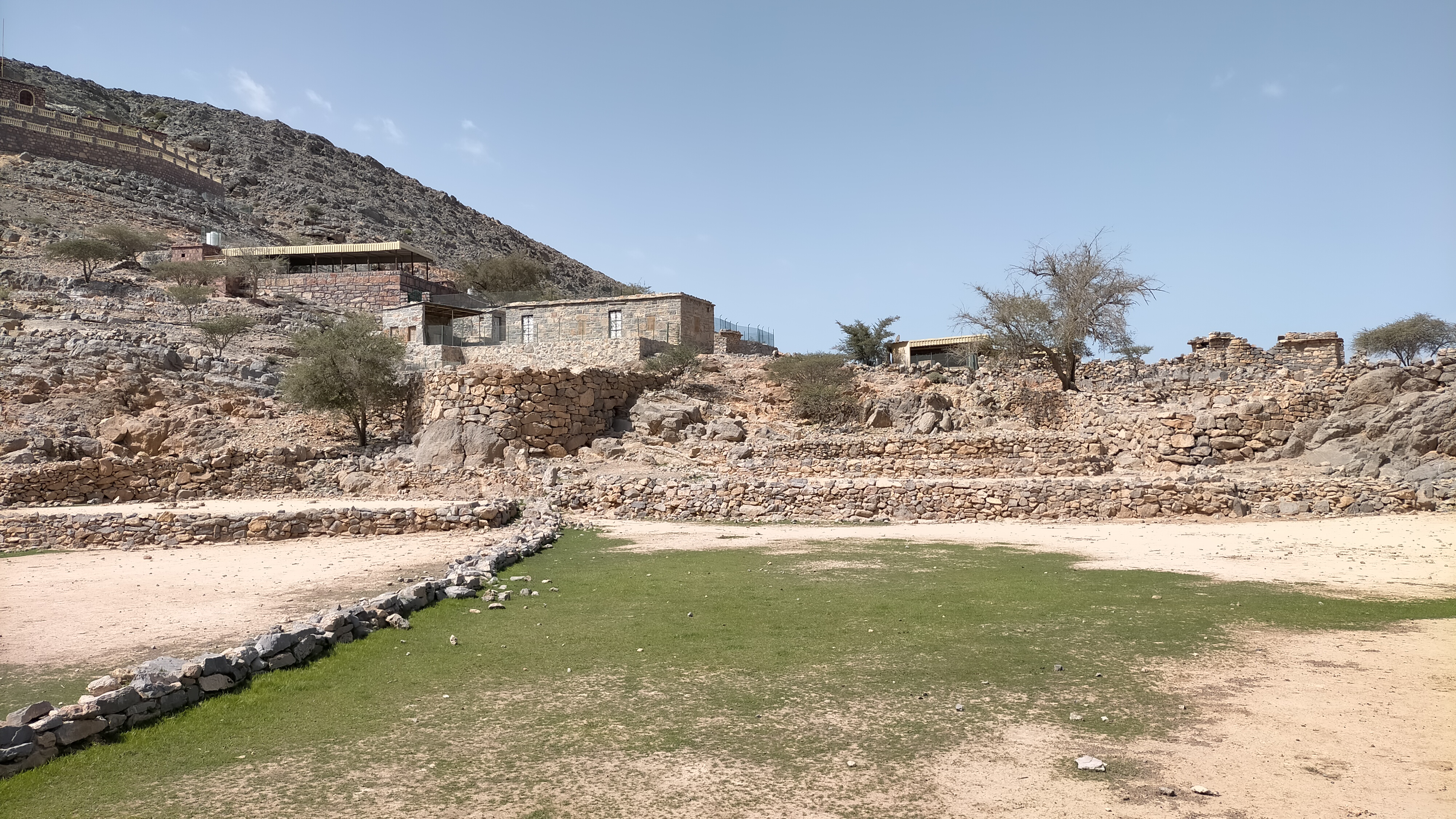
Old and new constructions, in Silay Al Khatami

Alternative names: Deira Al-Sali Al-Khathami, Al-Sali Al-Khathami, Silail, Silay Al Khātamī, Silay Al Khatamī, Slai al-Quda', Silay al-Quda.

There is no history of this town in the historical maps prior to the independence of the UAE, nor in the geographical databases, except for a brief review by Julian F. Walker on the map prepared by hand in 1959, in which it is mentioned by the name of Silail, although its exact position on that map is not precise enough.

Maps published by the Military Survey, Abu Dhabi between 1986 and 1991, used to develop "The national atlas of the United Arab Emirates", in 1993, names are written and transliterated as they are pronounced by the natives of the settlements. This town appears with the aforementioned name of Silay Al Khatamī.

== Geography ==
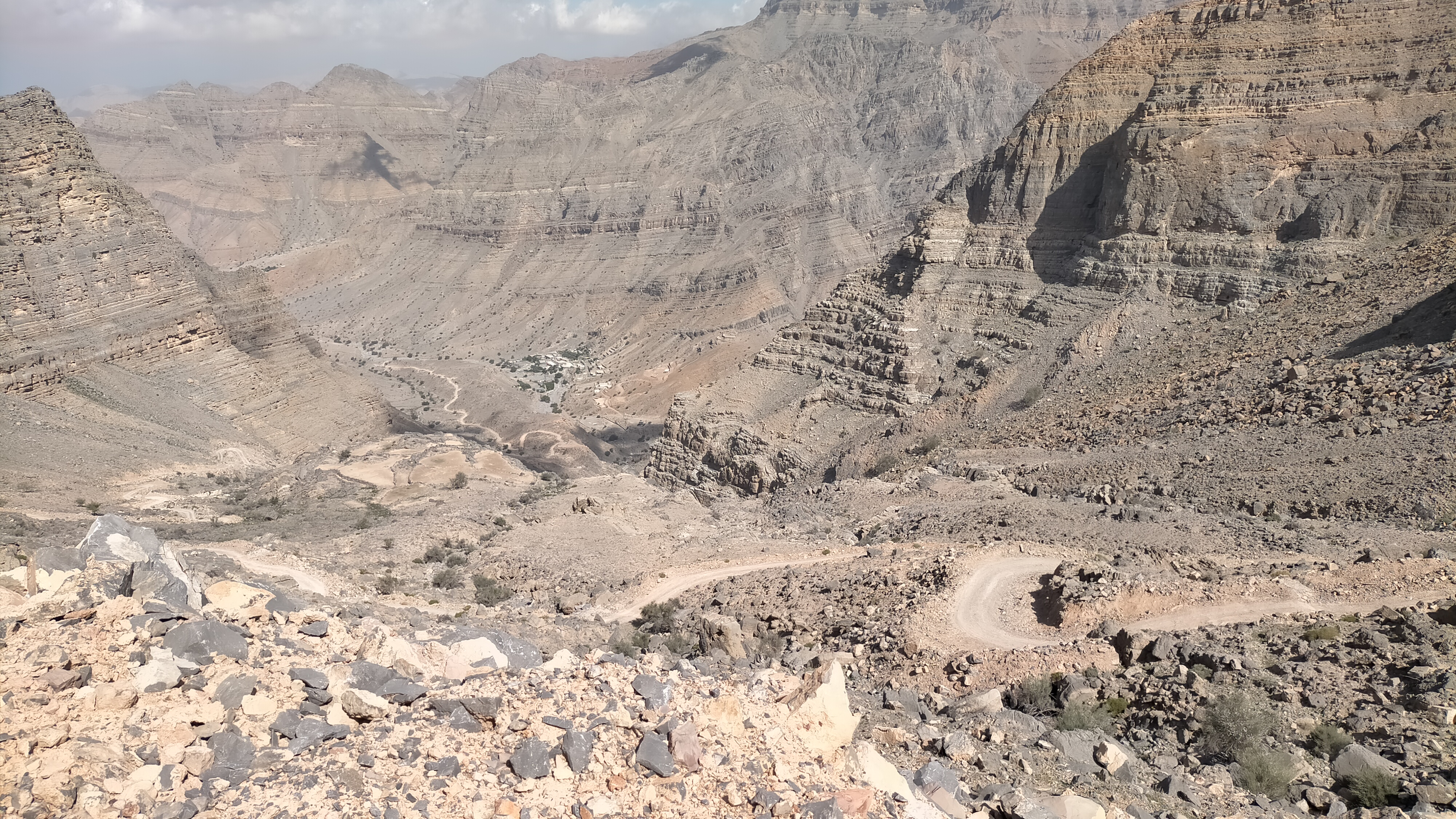
View of Wadi Qada'ah, from Silay Al Khatami

Silay Al Khatami is located high on the mountain, between the valleys that form Wadi Qada'ah and Wadi Naqab, one kilometer from the neighboring village of Tafif (Aţ Ţе̄f), to the west of the Jebel Tafif 1,598 m (5,243 ft), located in the territory of Oman.

From the top of the 985 m (3,232 ft) hill overlooking the town of Silay Al Khatami to the south, there are views of the Wadi Naqab and some of its towns, villages and farming areas. British anthropologists William and Fidely Lancaster, in their book Honour is in Contentment: Life Before Oil in Ras Al Khaimah (UAE) and Some Neighboring Regions, refer several times to the village of Silay Al Khatami (then known as Slai al-Quda' or Silay al-Quda), and describe from there the position and names of some wadis and villages located south:

Up at Slai al-Quda', a Habsi said,

These fields are part of Slai. That side wadi, the Thala, doesn't come out in the Nagab, it twists back on itself and comes down into the Quda'. That field group is Wa'ab Salwa; then Tabara al-Kabir and Tabara as-Saghir, with Yinas down below. All those buildings to the south belong to Tafif, with Azhabat along the ridge. Looking down from the ridge, you see Samarat. The little place there is Bai'ba with Shairi beyond. The little place up there with the date trees is Slaiya. These fields before you reach Slai, with the very long water channel, are An-Nahr and part of Slai. All of them belong to Habus.

There are many little groups of buildings around the fields at Slai, and thirteen graveyards. Each group of buildings has its own graveyard.

== Population ==
The entire area near Silay Al Khatami was populated by the Habus tribe, and corresponded mainly to the Banī Huraymish tribal area.

== See also ==
- List of wadis of the United Arab Emirates
- List of mountains in the United Arab Emirates
