= Wadi Qada'ah =

Wadi in the UAE

Wadi Qada'ah Wādī Kidā'ah
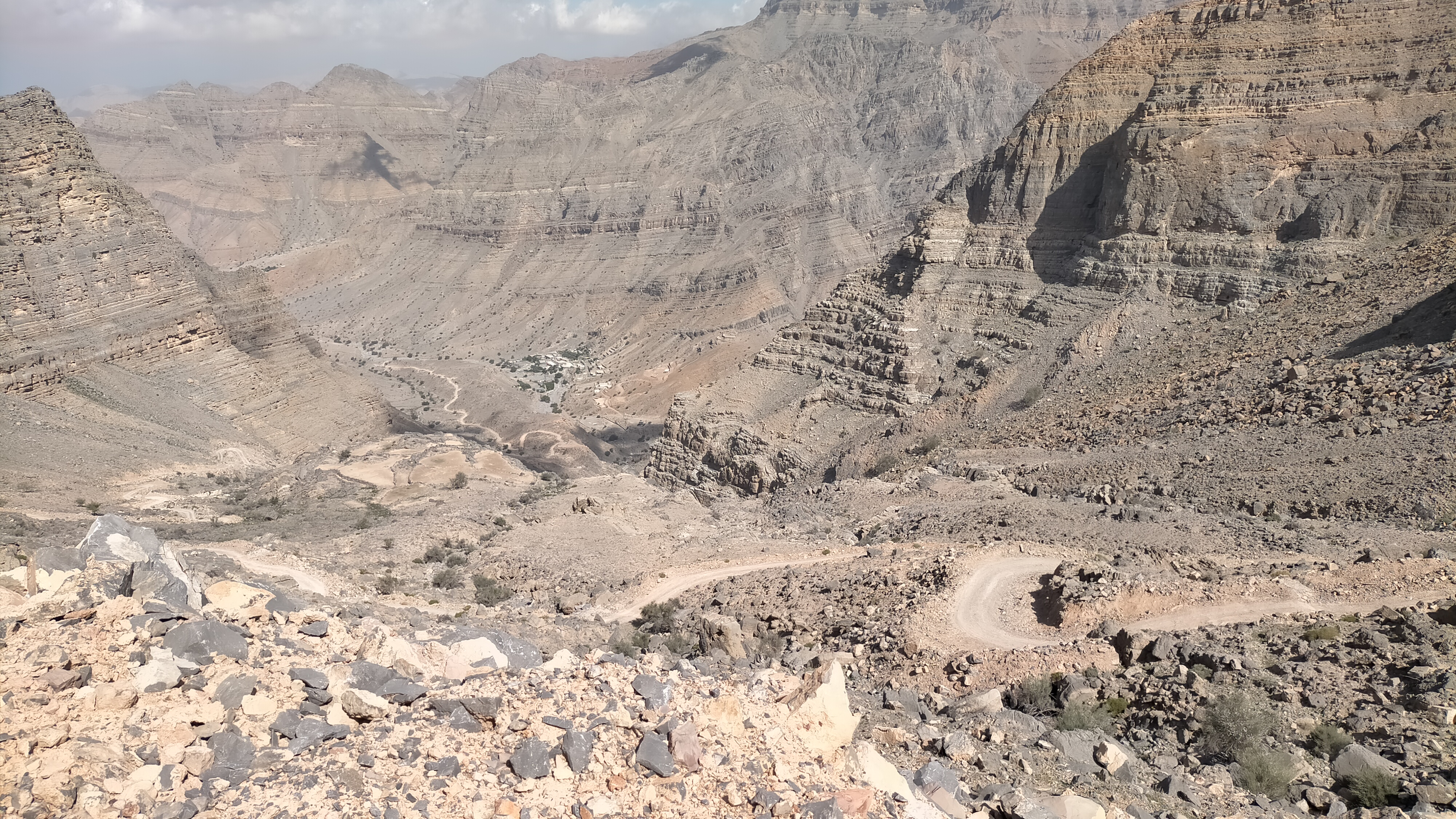
- Wadi Qada'ah. Tributary of Wadi al Bih. View from the village of Silay Al Khatami

- Location within United Arab Emirates Location within Persian Gulf Location within Middle East Location within West and Central Asia
- Native name: وادي كداعة (Arabic)

Location
- Country: United Arab Emirates
- Emirate: Ras Al Khaimah

Physical characteristics
- Source: Northern slope of Jabal Tafif, in the Sultanate of Oman
  - elevation: 1,268 m (4,160 ft)
- Mouth: Wadi al Bih
  - coordinates: 25°46′56.3″N 56°03′46.4″E
  - elevation: 92 m (302 ft)
- Length: 15.3 km (9.5 mi)
- Basin size: 483 km^{2} (186 mi^{2})

Basin features
- River system: Wadi al Bih

Wadi Qada'ah (Arabic: وادي كداعة, romanized: Wādī Kidā'ah) is a valley or dry river, with intermittent flow, which flows almost exclusively during the rainy season, located about 10 kilometers east of Ras Al Khaimah, United Arab Emirates. The wadi flows into the Wadi Bih.

Hedgehogs and caracals live in the valley, and dates have been grown at the higher elevations.

In the upper reaches of the Wadi Qada'ah is the historic village of Qada'ah, very close to the border between UAE and Oman, and to the north and northeast of the wadi, rises the impressive southern slope of Jabal Qada'ah, also known as Jabal Al Ahqab, with an elevation of 1,375 m and a prominence of 460 m, making it one of the highest peaks in the UAE.

In Wadi Qada'ah there are several excellent hiking routes, but also rock climbing and canyoning areas, not suitable for hiking. Accidents involving people who enter areas that are inappropriate for hiking are frequent.

== Toponymy ==
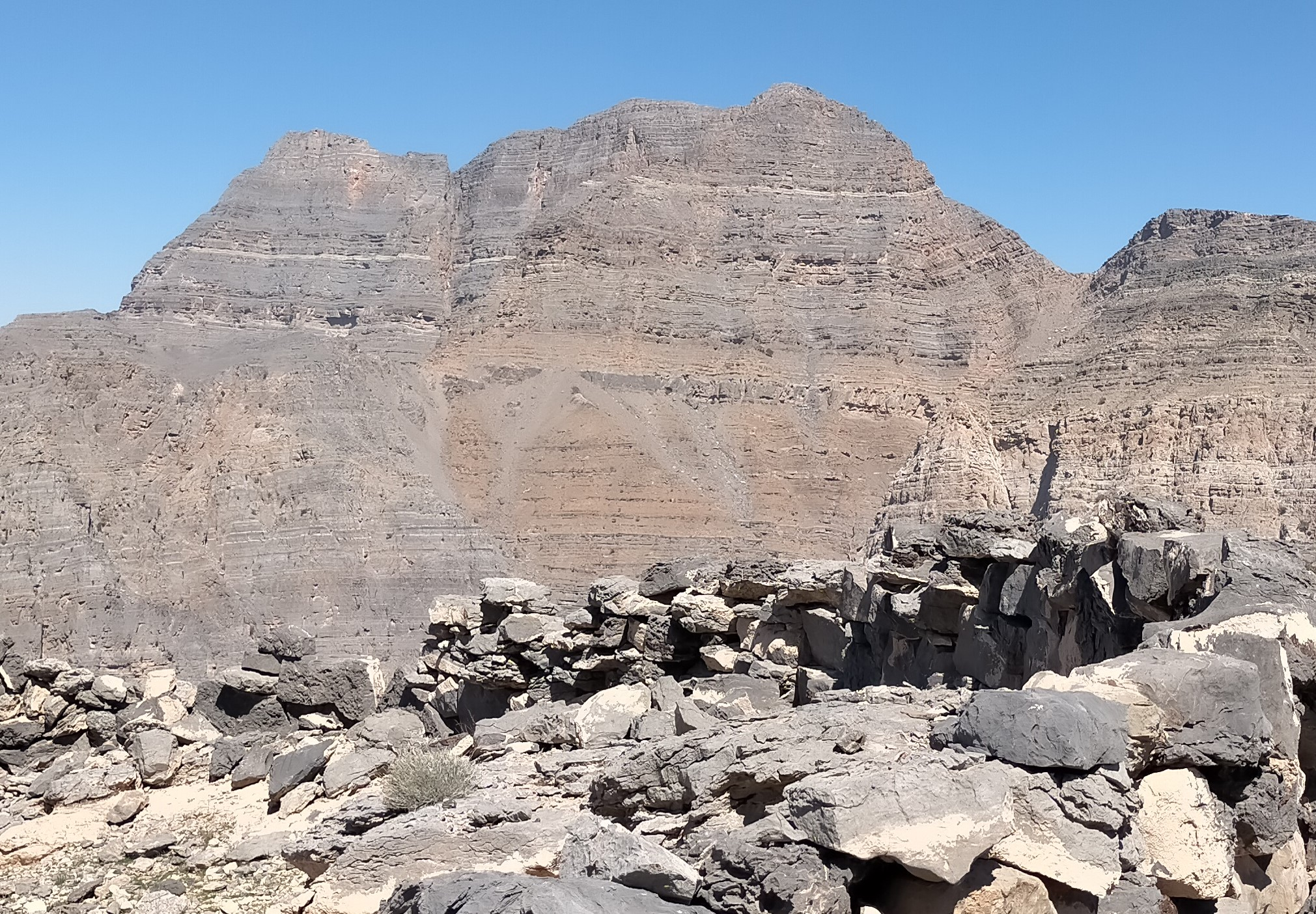
Southern slope of Jabal Qada'ah, also called Jabal Al Ahqab, seen from the village of Qada'ah

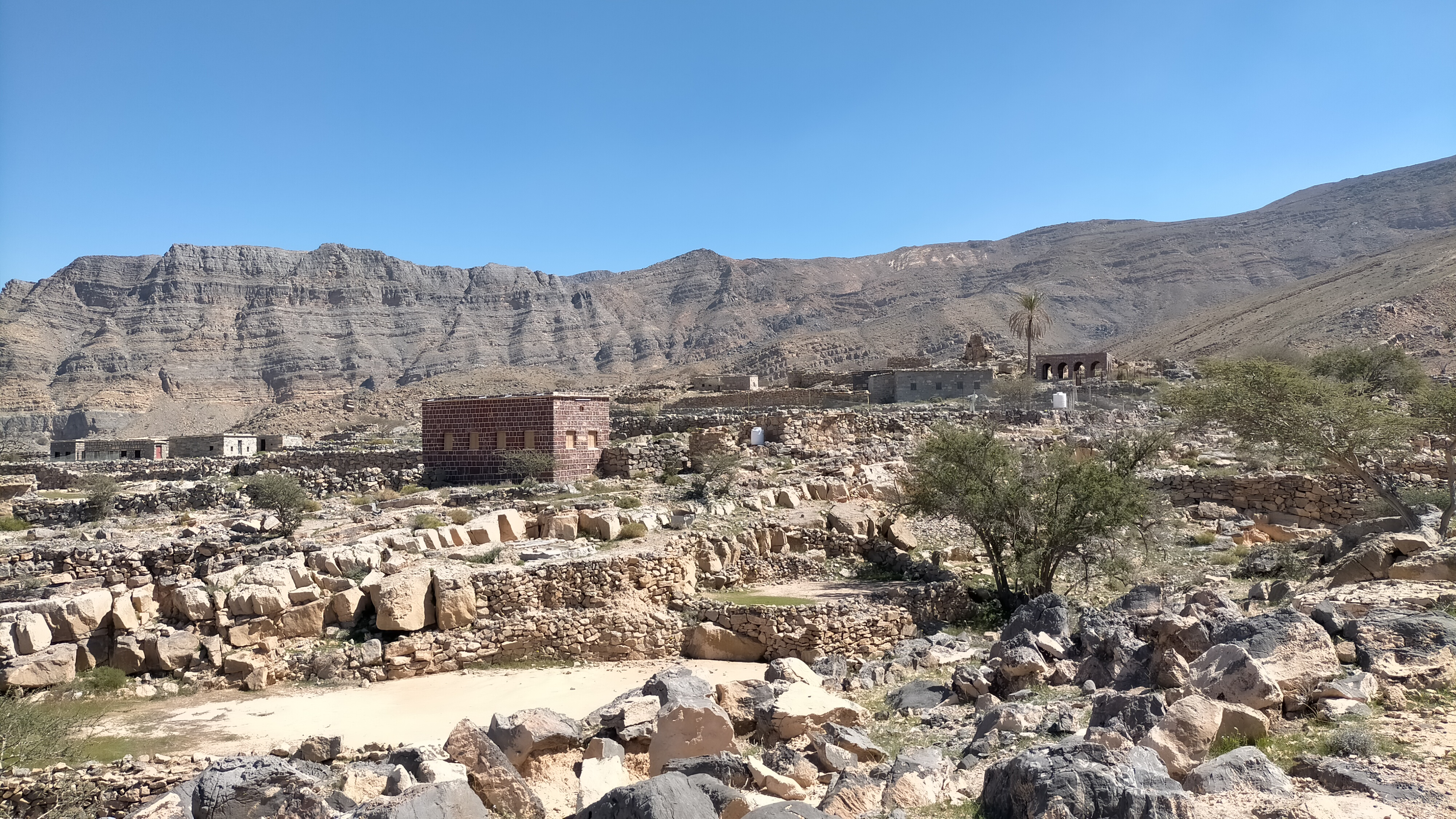
Qada'ah. Village located in the mountains of Ras Al Khaimah (UAE), south of Jabal Qada'ah, on a high plateau overlooking the course of Wadi Qada'ah, very close to the territorial boundary between UAE and Oman

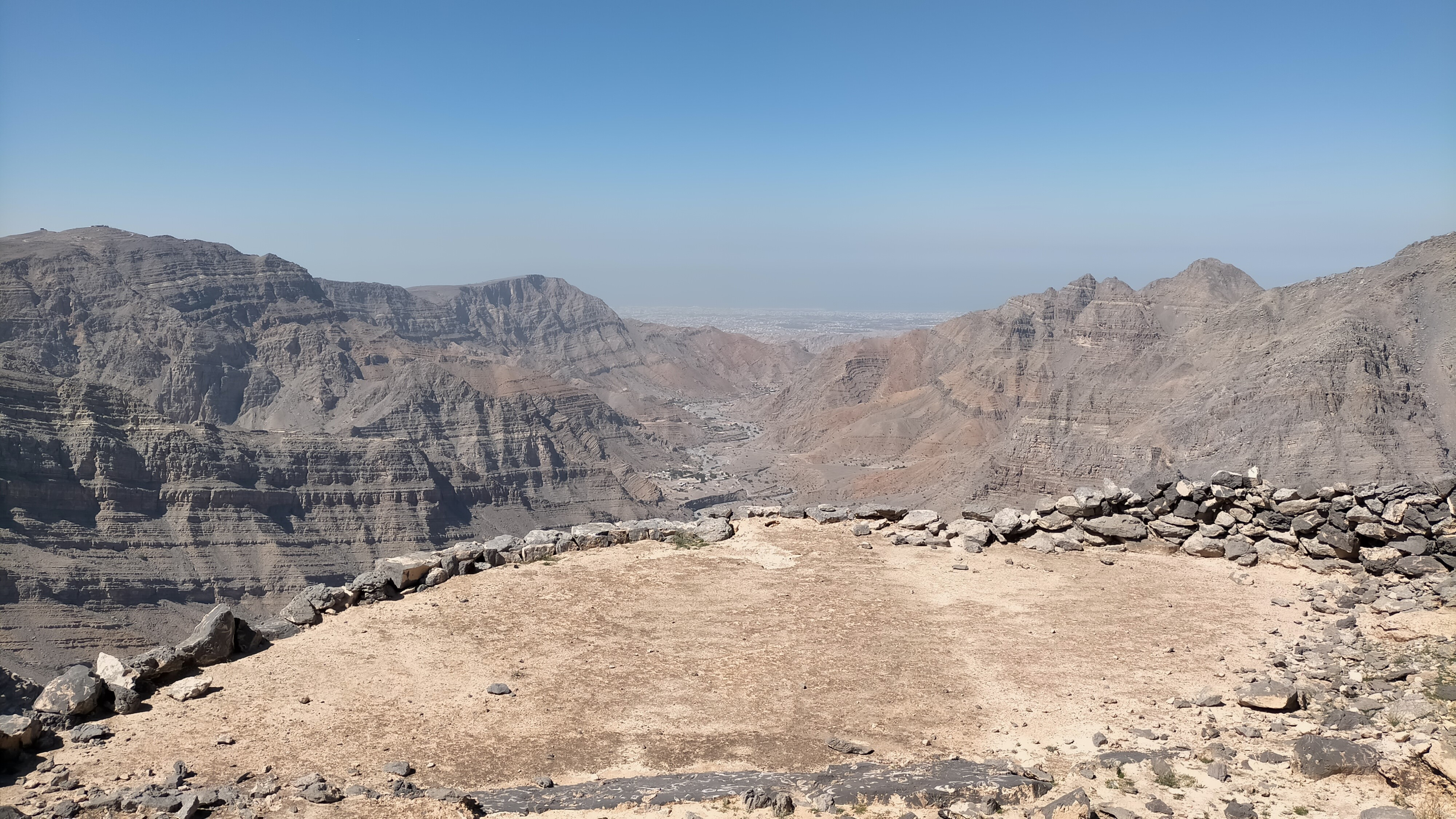
View of Wadi Qada'ah from Qada'ah Village

Alternative Names: Wadi Kida'ah, Wadi Qida'a, Wadi Qada`a, Wadi Qada`ah, Wadi Qadda`a, Wādī Qada'a, Wādī Qada'ah, Wādī Qadda'a, Wadi Quda'ah.

It also appears, with the spelling Wādī Kidā'ah, in the National Atlas of the United Arab Emirates.

== See also ==
- List of wadis of the United Arab Emirates
- List of mountains in the United Arab Emirates
- List of wadis of Oman
- List of mountains in Oman
