= Geology of the United Arab Emirates =

The geology of the United Arab Emirates includes very thick Paleozoic, Mesozoic and Cenozoic marine and continental sedimentary rocks overlying deeply buried Precambrian. The region has extensive oil and gas resources and was deformed during the last several million years by more distant tectonic events.

== Geologic history, stratigraphy and tectonics ==
Atop the crystalline and igneous metamorphic basement rock of the Arabian Shield, Huqf Group clastics, carbonates and evaporites are the oldest sedimentary rocks in the UAE. Throughout the Paleozoic, the region experienced mainly clastic deposition. Carbonates are rare, except from the Cambrian, early-middle Devonian and early-middle Carboniferous. Jebel Dhanna in Abu Dhabi and the offshore islands of Dalma, Arzana, Zirkouh and Das have some of the oldest surface exposures: dolomite, shale and volcanic rocks brought to the surface by salt tectonics. The Hercynian orogeny affected the Middle East Craton in the Late Carboniferous, driving erosion and warping. Clastics deposited on the unconformity left by the erosion through the Permian, principally sandstone, siltstone, anhydrite and dolomite.

=== Mesozoic (251-66 million years ago) ===
With the formation of the supercontinent Pangea, the area became more arid in the Permian into the Triassic. Shallow water carbonates and evaporites belonging to the Khuff Formation deposited during a marine transgression, with microcrystalline dolomite, limestone and anhydrite up to 2.9 kilometres (1.8 miles) thick and recording five marine regressions. With the westward uplifting of the region, it was succeeded by the Sudair Formation (dolomite, argillaceous limestone, shale and anhydrite) and the Gulailh and Jilh formations (offshore and on-shore in Abu Dhabi respectively). A full scale marine regression is recorded in the clastic lacustrine sandstones and limestones of the Minjur Formation.

A very large carbonate platform took shape during a major marine transgression in the Jurassic, leaving behind the Hamlah Formation greywacke and mudstone from the early Jurassic, the middle Jurassic Araej Formation and the oolite dominated Asab Formation in the east. In the 1960s and 1970s, oil companies described the Thamama Group.

The early Cretaceous is marked by the fossil-bearing Shuaiba Formation, which contains breccia and mollusk-rich limestone as well as ammonite fossils. The Middle Cretaceous Wasia Group, including the Nahr Umr, Salbikh and Mishrif formations occurs between Abu Dhabi and Qatar and deposited during a time of moderate uplift and erosion. As a result, the Nahr Umr Formation contains glauconite sands, shale, small phosphates and some limestone. However, a marine transgression took place by the time of the Mauddud Member deposition. The thick limestone sequence of the Mishrif Formation deposited in the Shilaif Basin, with a thickness of 1,600 feet (490 metres) in the west offshore and 865 ft (264 m) in the Umm Addalkh field. The packstone, greywacke and limestone contains abundant rudist fossils. The Aruma Group marks two successive transgression-regression events in the late Cretaceous, with the Laffan Formation argillaceous limestone and the Halul Formation calcareous shale and lime-mudstone from the first event and the marl-shale-mudstone Fiqa Formation and greywacke-dolomite Simsima Formation from the second event.

=== Cenozoic (66 million years ago-present) ===
A disconformity appeared with a drop in sea level in the Cenozoic. In the Paleogene, the Qatar Arch was comparatively stable and Abu Dhabi was at the edge of the Rub al Khali and Pabdeh-Gurpi (centered in the North Emirates) basins. The Hasa Group includes Umm Er Radhuma, Rus and Dammam formations. The Pabdeh Formation is largely offshore and contains 2,200 feet (670 metres) of shale and argillaceous limestone.

The Umm Er Radhuma Formation ranges from 1150 feet in the northwest to 2300 in the east with limestone, dolomite, argillite, sabkha cycles, shale and anhydrite. Evaporite formed in the early Eocene leaving the 200 to 840 foot Rus Formation which also includes minor argillaceous limestones. A return to lower salinity and shallow marine conditions in the Middle Eocene deposited the nummulitic carbonates of the Dammam Formation, as well as dolomite and subordinate shales. Uplift and erosion affected the region into the Oligocene. The partially dolomite, and fossiliferous limestone dominated Asmari Formation emplaced in the far east, followed by the 400 to 2,800 feet (120 to 850 metres) Gachsaran Formation from the early Miocene, with anhydrite and dolomite, ascending to dolomite, limestone, anhydrite, shale, marl and other carbonates. The Gachsaran depocenter was located in onshore Abu Dhabi.

During the late Miocene and into the Pliocene, the Alpine Orogeny which uplifted the Alps and the Himalayas affected the region, uplifting the Omani and Zagros Mountains and driving significant erosion. Muds, sabkha deposits, windblown sand, conglomerate limestone, beach gravel and silt are all defining sediments of the past 2.5 million years of the Quaternary.

== Hills and mountains ==
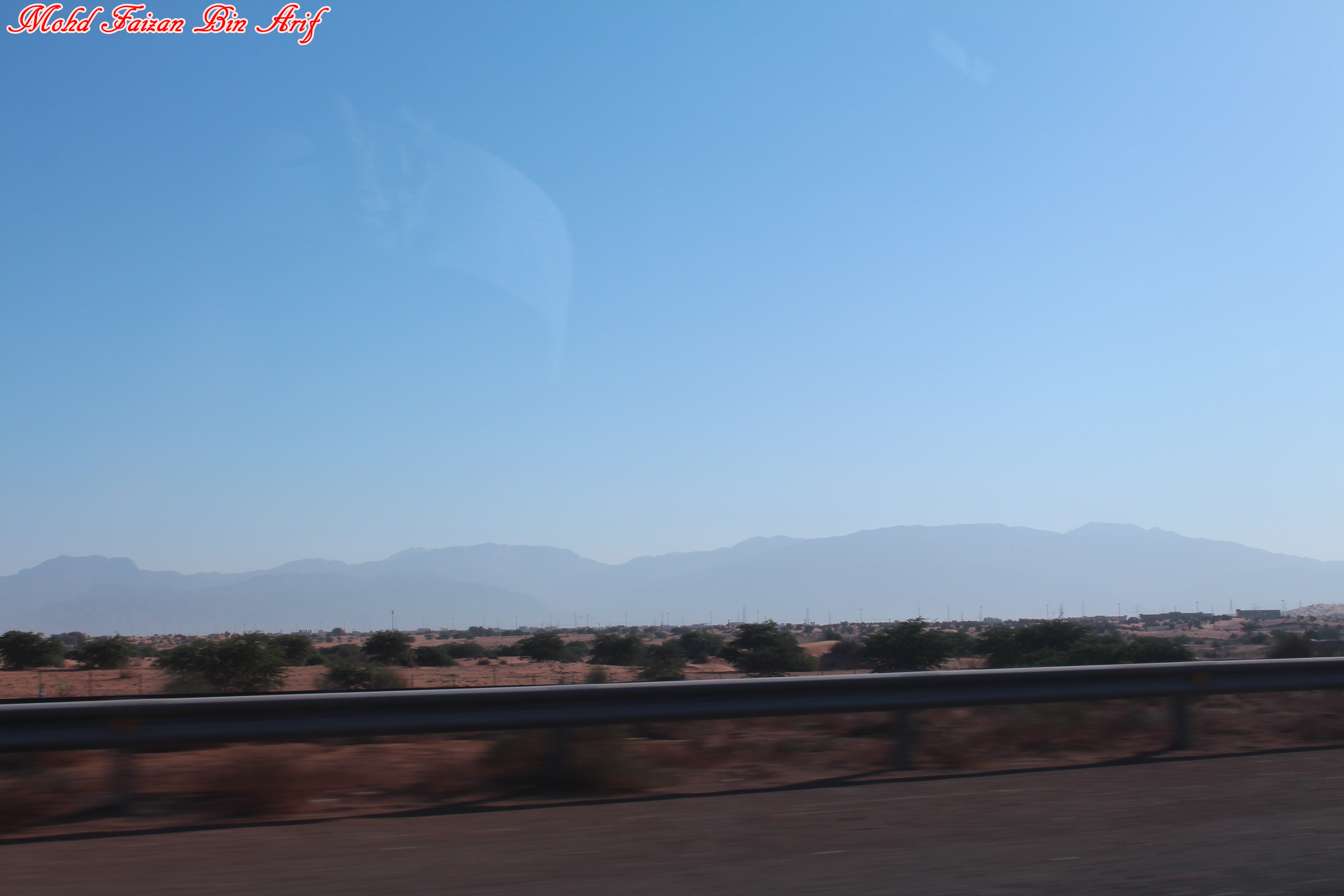
The Ru'us al-Jibal, including Jebel Al Mebrah, near Ras Al Khaimah in the northeast

On the country's eastern border with Oman are the Western Hajar Mountains:

The highest mountains in the Emirates, located entirely within its territory, or with its peak located exactly on the border with Oman, are the following:

  - Jabal ar Rahrah (1,691 m) Emirate of Ras Al Khaimah - Coordinates 25.94419°N, 56.15219°E
  - Jabal Sal (1,575 m) Emirate of Ras Al Khaimah (on the border between UAE and Oman) - Coordinadas 25.93251°N, 56.16921°E
  - Jabal Harf Tila - I (1,568 m) Emirate of Ras Al Khaimah (on the border between UAE and Oman) - Coordinates 25°41'21.4"N 56°09'30.6"E
  - Jabal Harf Tila - II (1,555 m) Emirate of Ras Al Khaimah - Coordinates 25°41'11.8"N 56°09'20.9"E
  - Jabal Raḩabah (1,543 m) Emirate of Ras Al Khaimah - Coordinates 25.92610°N, 56.11689°E
  - Jebel Al Mebrah (1.505 m) Emirate of Fujairah - Coordinates 25.64860°N, 56.12860°E
  - Jabal Yibir (1,489 m) Emirate of Ras Al Khaimah - Coordinates 25.667600, 56.135750
  - Jabal Yabānah (1.480 m) Emirate of Ras Al Khaimah (on the border between UAE and Oman) - Coordinates 25.87500°N, 56.16000°E
  - Jebel Halhal (1,435 m) Emirate of Ras Al Khaimah - Coordinates 25.94184°N, 56.13511°E
  - Jabal Qada‘ah (1,370 m) Emirate of Ras Al Khaimah - Coordinates 25.77781°N, 56.14190°E
  - Jabal Ḩafīt / Jebel Hafeet (1,249 m)
- Other mountains:
  - Jabal al Fāyah - Jebel Faya (392 m)
  - Jebel Buhais (340 m)
  - Jabal Yanas
  - Jebel Al-Heben
- Shumayliyyah

== See also ==
- List of United Arab Emirates-related topics
  - Geography of the United Arab Emirates
