= List of mountains in the United Arab Emirates =

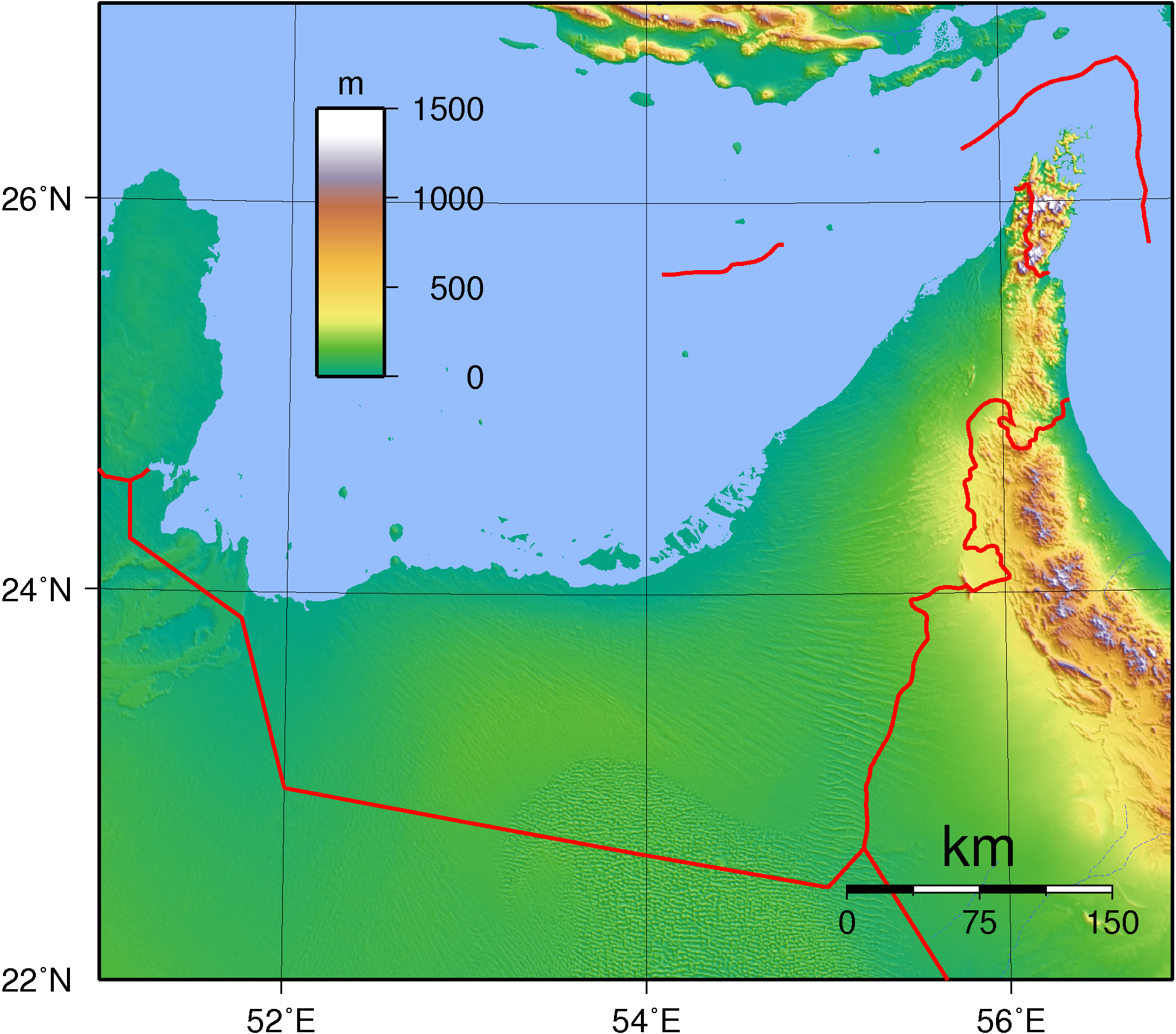
United Arab Emirates topographic map

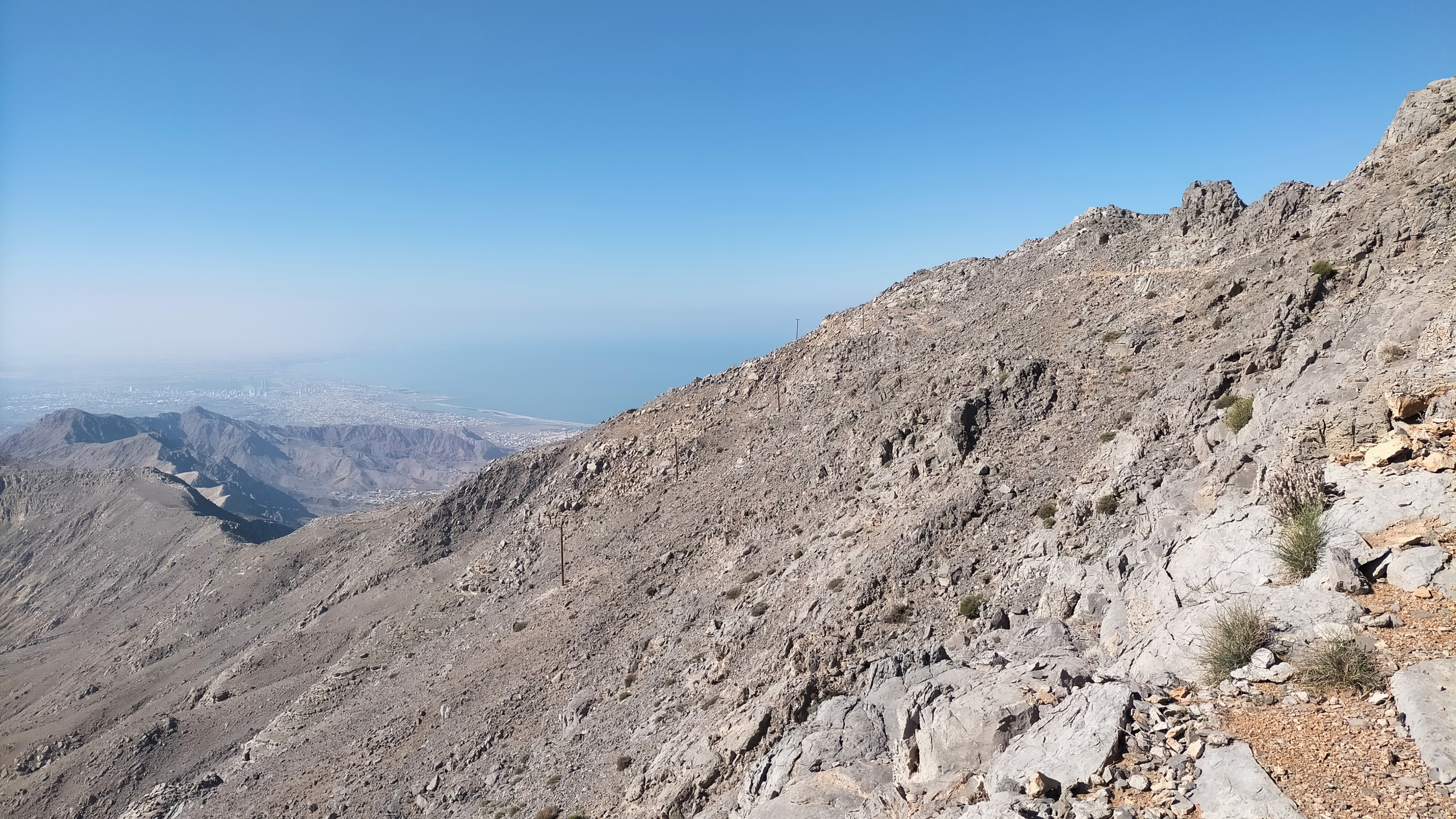
To the south of Jabal Raḩabah (1,543 m), there is a ridge of about 10 km in length, parallel to the coast

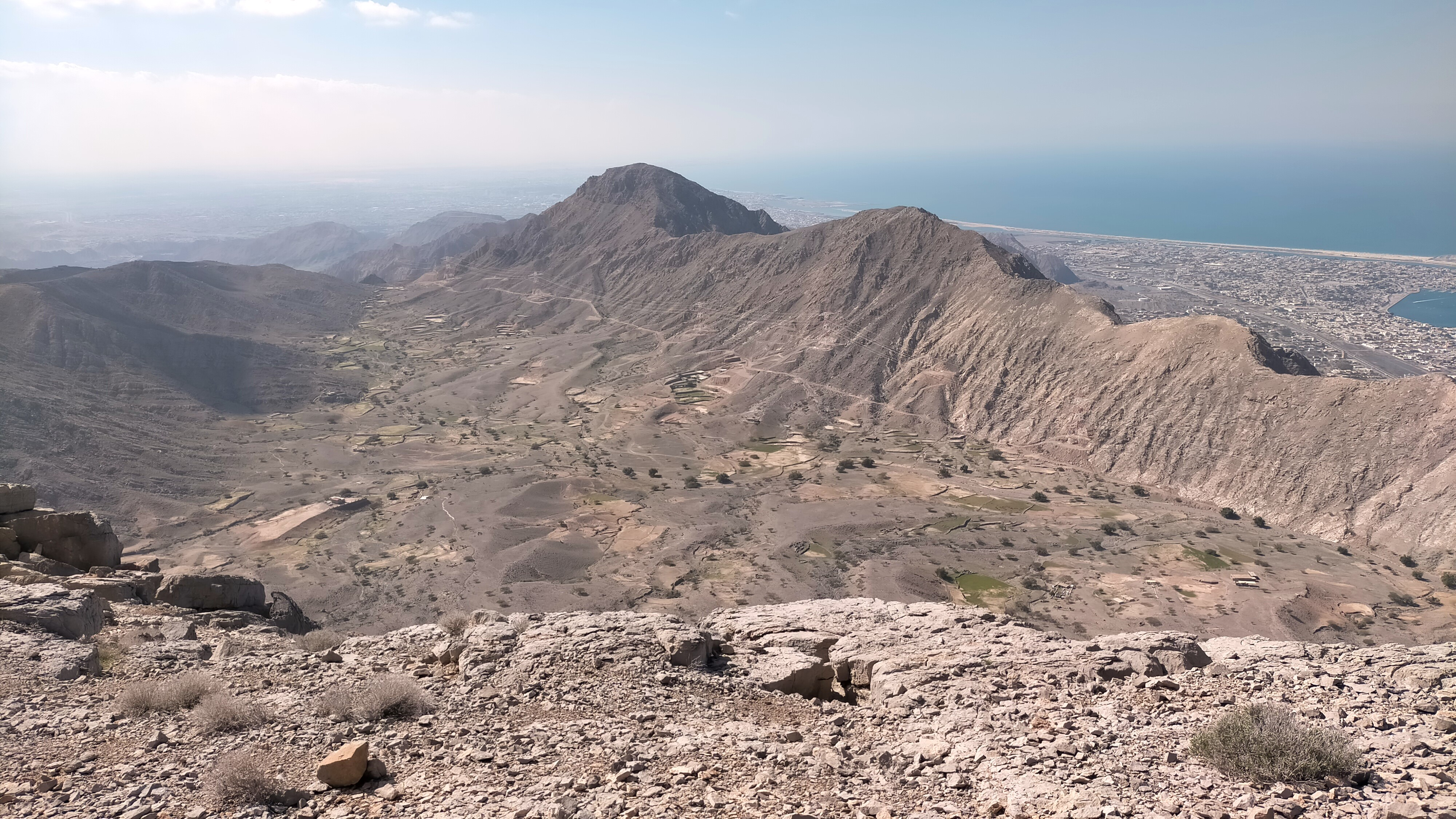
View towards the Jabal Rams. In the background the city of Rams and the Persian Gulf Coast

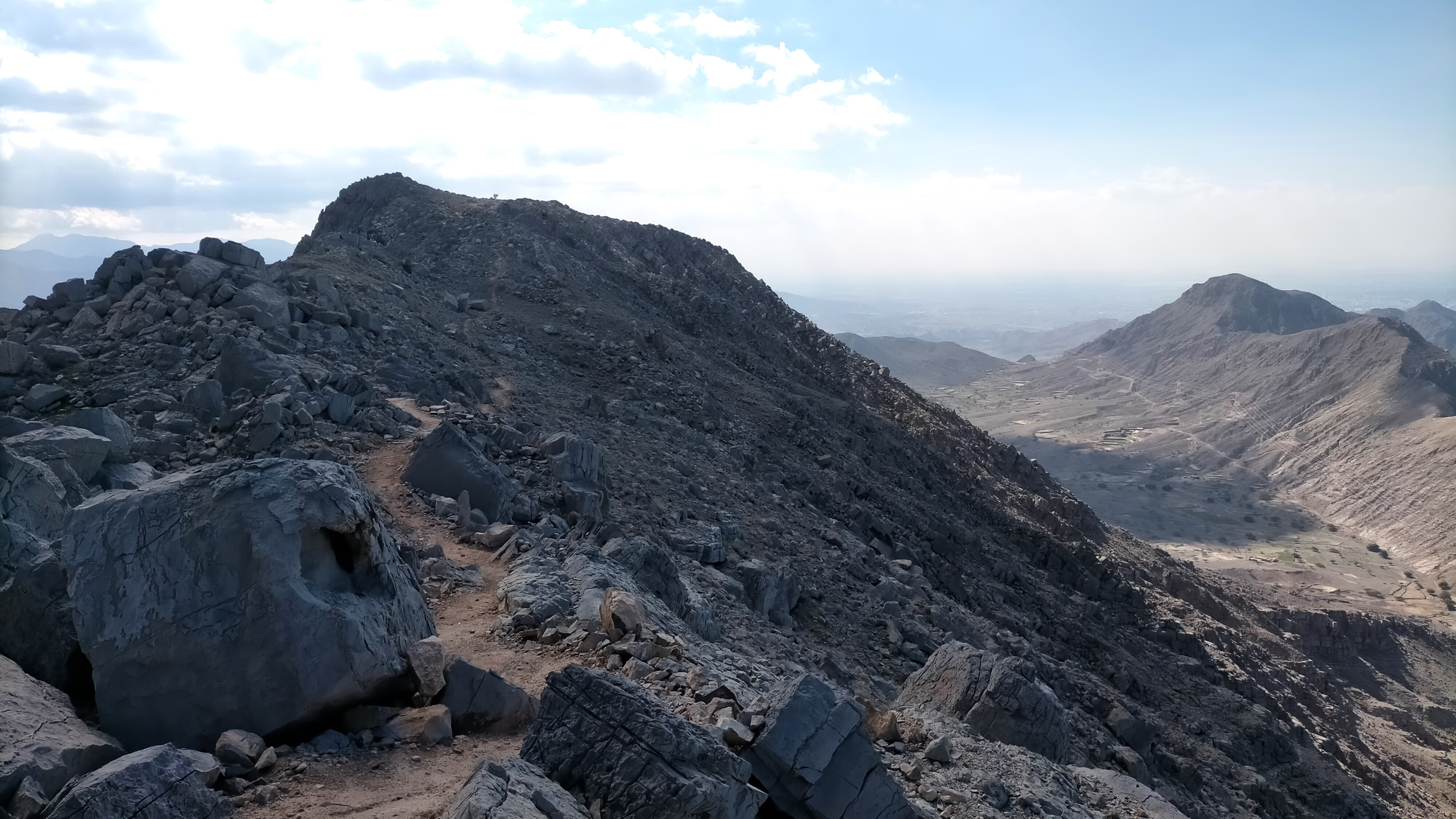
View from the top of Jabal Naqat

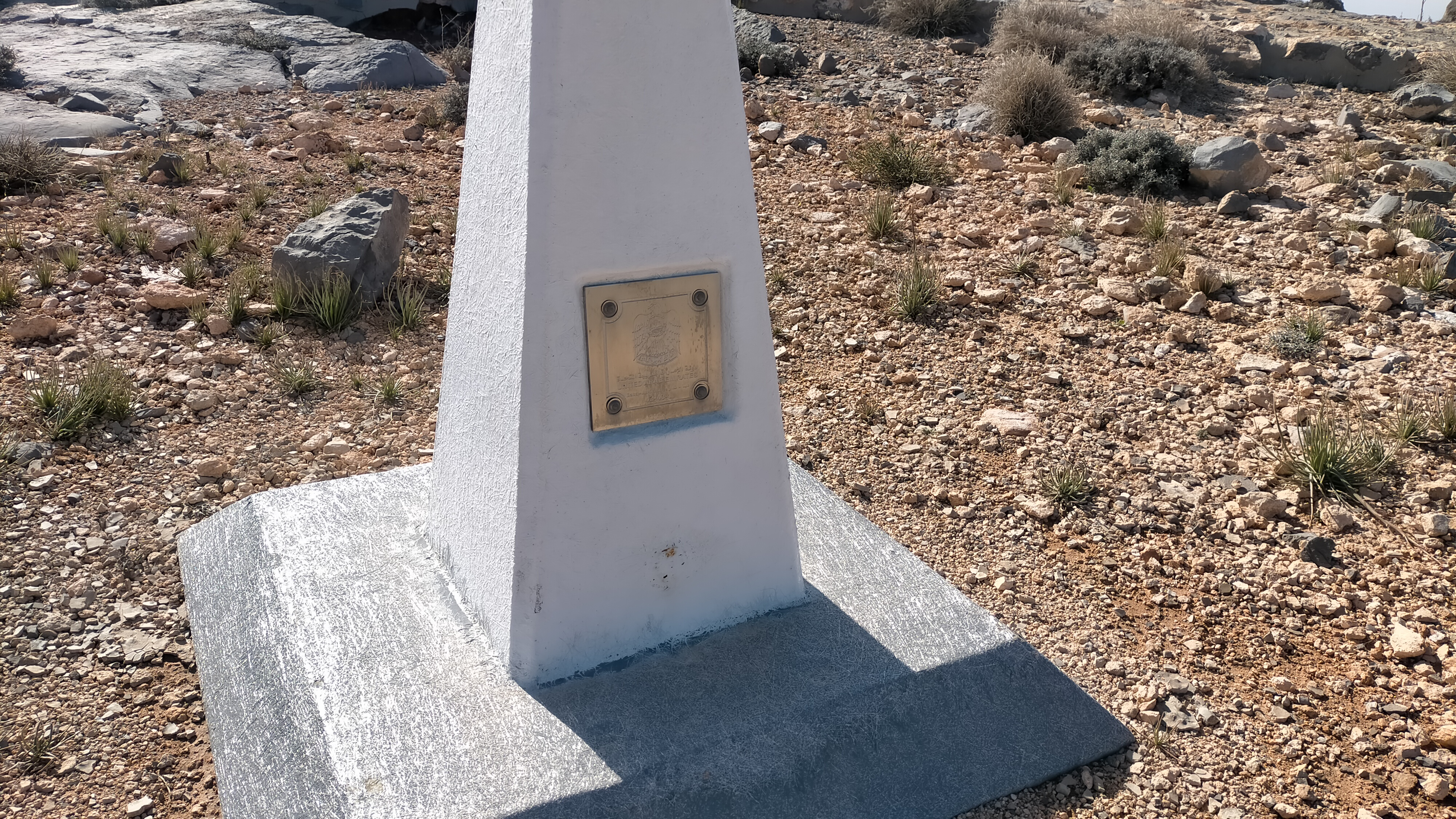
Border marker - Oman - UAE

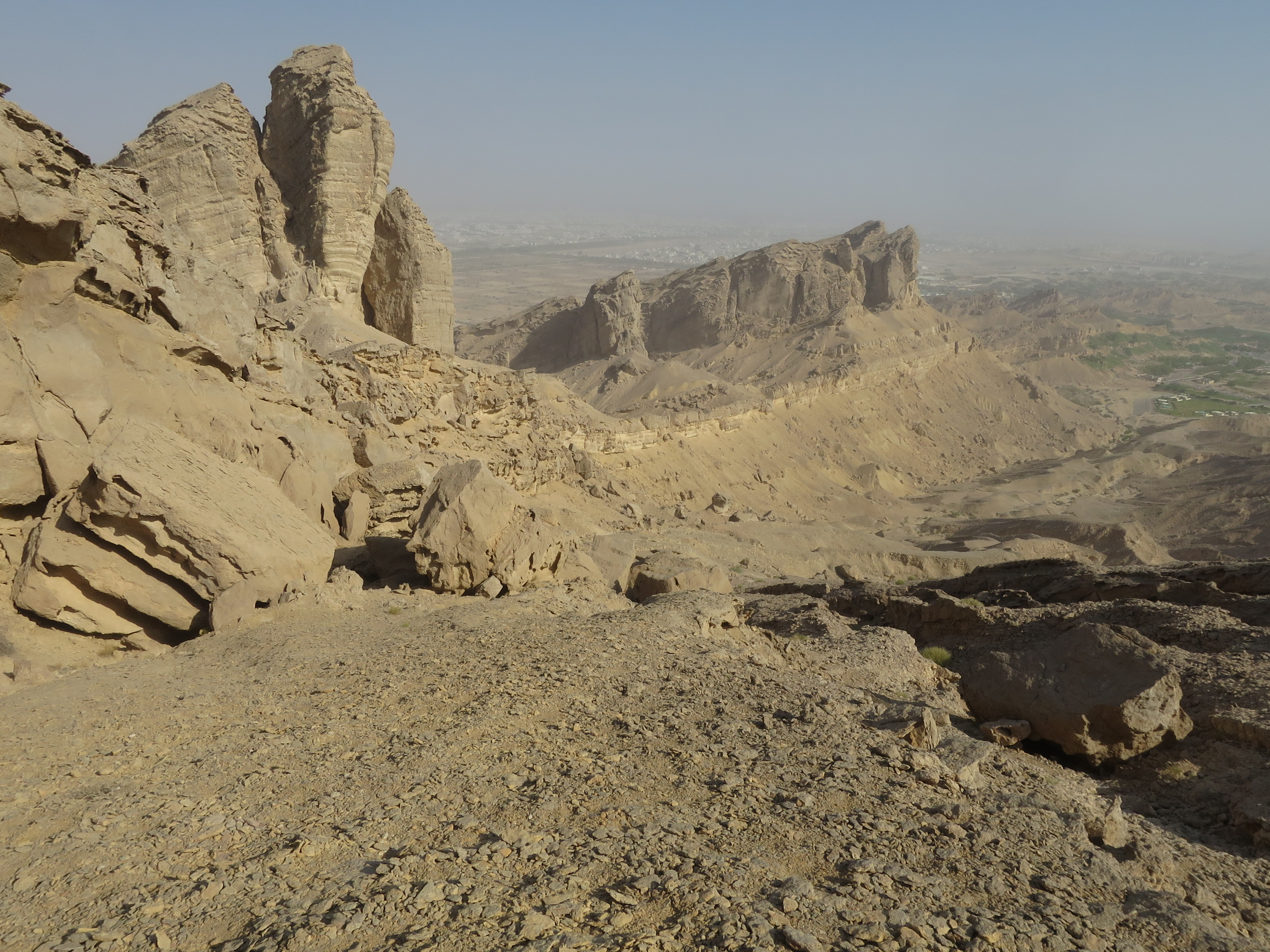
View of Jebel Hafeet

The United Arab Emirates is not a mountainous country, as most of its territory is desert or semi-desert and relatively flat, but it does have excellent mountains, which are part of the Hajar Mountains, located in the northeast of Oman and east of the UAE, which are the highest in the eastern part of the Arabian Peninsula.

Most of the country's mountains, with altitudes higher than 1,000 metres (3,300 feet), are located in the Emirate of Ras Al Khaimah, and it is no coincidence that some of its most important summits are located exactly on the border with the Sultanate of Oman, as, in some cases, their position was taken as a reference for the drawing of the border limits between both countries.

A boundary agreement was signed and ratified in 2003 for the entire border between the United Arab Emirates and Oman, including Oman's Musandam Peninsula and Al Madhah enclaves, but the contents of the agreement, and detailed maps showing the alignment, have not been published, although border stones have been placed. The future publication of these agreements and maps could make it necessary to modify the content of this article.

This list includes the name and location of the summits located entirely within the territory of the United Arab Emirates, or at least with its summit located on the border line, regardless of its height. The list is open to new additions referring to mountains that meet these conditions, with a known name and position, and whose reference data is supported by historical maps or other reliable documentary sources.

Many of these mountains are known by different names, the result of local tradition and of the various transcriptions from Arabic to English, so that an individual reference note includes the alternative names with which the mountain has been identified at some point, accompanied by their respective documentary sources.

The region is represented in different satellite images, mainly Google Earth, Google Satellite and Bing Satellite. The exact coordinates of each summit and its altitude, with respect to sea level, have been established by comparing the OpenTopoMap and OpenMapTiles topographic maps with these images, treating each with the greatest objectivity and the same measurement criteria for all the summits. In some cases, direct recognition and location by GPS have also been used, or references have been checked against data provided by hikers and climbers in itineraries published online.

In this article, the values of prominence were not taken into account, nor the topographic isolation, to give priority to identifying the mountains and location of their summits.

== List of mountains ==
Mountains of United Arab Emirates
Name	Notes and citations	Order	Mountain range	Country	Emirate / Governorate	Altitude (m)	Coordinates
Jabal as Sayh	(Note: Alternative Names: Jabal as Sayh, Jabal as Sayḩ.)	001	Hajar Mountains	United Arab Emirates; Oman	Ras Al Khaimah Musandam	1,746	25°58′18.8″N 56°11′30″E
Jabal Hadaba	(Note: Alternative Names: Jebel Hadaba.)	002	Hajar Mountains	United Arab Emirates; Oman	Ras Al Khaimah Musandam	1,712	26°01′08.4″N 56°10′56.2″E
Jabal Ar Rahrah	(Note: Alternative Names: Jabal Rahah, Jabal Rāḩah, Jabal ar Rahrah, Jabal ar Raḩraḩ.)	003	Hajar Mountains	United Arab Emirates	Ras Al Khaimah	1,691	25°56′39.1″N 56°09′07.9″E
Jabal Sal	(Note: Alternative Names: Jabal Sal, Jabal Sall, Jabal Sāl, jbl sal, جبل سال)	004	Hajar Mountains	United Arab Emirates	Ras Al Khaimah	1,575	25°55′57.0″N 56°10′09.2″E
Jabal Harf Tila	(Note: Alternative Names: Jabal Harf Tila (major))	005	Hajar Mountains	United Arab Emirates; Oman	Ras Al Khaimah Musandam	1,568	25°41′21.4″N 56°09′30.6″E
Jabal Rahabah	(Note: Alternative Names: Jabal Rahabah, Jabal Raḩabah, Jabal ar Ra`aylah, Jabal ar Ra‘aylah.)	006	Hajar Mountains	United Arab Emirates	Ras Al Khaimah	1,543	25°55′33″N 56°07′00″E
Jabal Yibir / Jabal Al-Mebrah	(Note: Alternative Names: Jabal Al-Mebrah, Jabal Mibraḥ, Jabal Al-Mebraḥ, Jabal Mibrah, Jabal al Mebrah, Jabal al Mibrah, Jabal Mebrah, Jebel Al Mebrah.)	007	Hajar Mountains	United Arab Emirates	Fujairah	1,527	25°38′54.9″N 56°07′42.9″E
Jabal Yabana	(Note: Alternative Names: Jabal Yabbānah, Jabal Yabana (major), Jabal Yabana, Jabal Yabanah, Jabal Yabānah.)	008	Hajar Mountains	United Arab Emirates; Oman	Ras Al Khaimah Musandam	1,480	25°52′30.0″N 56°09′36.0″E
Jabal Shintal	(Note: Alternative Names: Jabal Halhal.)	009	Hajar Mountains	United Arab Emirates	Ras Al Khaimah	1,435	25°56′30.6″N 56°08′06.4″E
Jabal Harf	(Note: Alternative Names: Jabal Ḩarf, Jabal al Ḩarf.)	010	Hajar Mountains	United Arab Emirates	Ras Al Khaimah	1,420	25°40′05.0″N 56°06′41.0″E
Jabal Al Ahqab / Jabal Qada'ah	(Note: Alternative Names: Jabal Qada‘a (major), Jabal Qada`a, Jabal Qada`ah, Jabal Qada‘a, Jabal Qada‘ah.)	011	Hajar Mountains	United Arab Emirates	Ras Al Khaimah	1,375	25°46′40″N 56°08′31″E
Um Alnosoor / Jabal Hatta	(Note: Alternative Names: Jabal Hajarain, Jabal Ḩajarayn, Jabal Hajarayn, Jabal Ḩattá, Jabal Ḩaţţah, Jabal Hattah, Jabal Hatta, Um Alnosoor, Umm Alnosoor, Jabal Umm Nasur.)	012	Hajar Mountains	United Arab Emirates; Oman	Dubai; Ajman Al Buraimi	1,280	24°44′35.8″N 56°04′53.1″E
Jabal Khabb	(Note: Alternative Names: Jabal Khab, Jabal Kubb)	013	Hajar Mountains	United Arab Emirates	Ras Al Khaimah	1,145	26°00′53″N 56°08′39.9″E
Jabal Masafi	(Note: Alternative Names: Jabal Masafi, Jabal Masāfī.)	014	Hajar Mountains	United Arab Emirates	Ras Al Khaimah Fujairah	1,134	25°18′40.0″N 56°12′37.1″E
Jebel Hafeet	(Note: Alternative Names: Djabel Hafit, Djabel Ḩafīt, Jabal Hafi, Jabal Hafit, Jabal Ḥafī, Jabal Ḥafīt, Jabal Ḩafīt, jbl hfyt, جبل حفيت)	015	Hajar Mountains	United Arab Emirates; Oman	Abu Dhabi Al Buraimi	1,108	24°03′28.3″N 55°46′52.5″E
Jabal Ghabbas	(Note: Alternative Names: Jebel Ghabbas.)	016	Hajar Mountains	United Arab Emirates; Oman	Ras Al Khaimah Musandam	1,100	25°50′52.3″N 56°09′09.1″E
Jabal Hilqah	(Note: Alternative Names: Jebel Hilqah.)	017	Hajar Mountains	United Arab Emirates	Fujairah	1,058	25°18′49.1″N 56°12′07.0″E
Jabal Dad	(Note: Alternative Names: Jabal Adhan, Jabal Dad, Jabal Dād.)	018	Hajar Mountains	United Arab Emirates	Fujairah	1,054	25°27′17.5″N 56°13′29.9″E
Jabal Hudayd	(Note: Alternative Names: Jabal Hudayd, Jabal Ḩudayd.)	019	Hajar Mountains	United Arab Emirates	Ras Al Khaimah	1,035	26°00′15.2″N 56°06′42.1″E
Jabal Al Itim	(Note: Alternative Names: Jabal Al 'Itim)	020	Hajar Mountains	United Arab Emirates	Fujairah	1,017	25°06′15.0030″N 56°10′12.6772″E
Jabal Ayuzah	(Note: Alternative Names: Jabal 'Ayūzah)	021	Hajar Mountains	United Arab Emirates	Fujairah	1,005	25°37′09.34″N 56°11′42.47″E
Jabal Qitab	(Note: Alternative Names: Jabal Al Kitāb, Jabal Kitas, Jabal Qitab.)	022	Hajar Mountains	United Arab Emirates	Fujairah	998	25°01′14.1″N 56°14′30.1″E
Jabal Qandus	(Note: Alternative Names: Jabal Qandus, Jabal Qandoos, Jabal Ghandus.)	023	Hajar Mountains	United Arab Emirates	Ras Al Khaimah	954	26°00′13.0″N 56°07′14.9″E
Jabal Ash Shu	(Note: Alternative Names: Jabal Ash Shu'.)	024	Hajar Mountains	United Arab Emirates	Ras Al Khaimah	950	25°07′33.0″N 56°09′31.6″E
Jabal Samah	(Note: Alternative Names: Jabal Şammāh, Jabal Samah, Jabal Samāḩ.)	025	Hajar Mountains	United Arab Emirates	Fujairah	937	25°07′32.8″N 56°10′14.9″E
Jabal Bu Faraj	(Note: Alternative Names: Jabal Bu Faraj, Jabal Abu Faraj, Jabal Bū Faraj, Jabal Bū Farāj.)	026	Hajar Mountains	United Arab Emirates; Oman	Ras Al Khaimah Musandam	913	24°52′15.7″N 56°03′42.2″E
Jabal Naqat	(Note: Alternative Names: Jebal Naqat, Jabal Niqaat.)	027	Hajar Mountains	United Arab Emirates	Ras Al Khaimah	900	25°53′17.9″N 56°05′21.8″E
Jabal Huwarah	(Note: Alternative Names: Jabal Ḩūwārah.)	028	Hajar Mountains	United Arab Emirates	Ras Al Khaimah	890	25°05′20.9″N 56°08′29.8″E
Jabal Najdayn	(Note: Alternative Names: Jabal Naydayn.)	029	Hajar Mountains	United Arab Emirates	Fujairah	875	25°10′52.2″N 56°10′21.3″E
Jabal Yabsah	(Note: Alternative Names: Jabal Jabsah, Jabal Yabisa.)	030	Hajar Mountains	United Arab Emirates	Fujairah	874	25°12′02.7″N 56°16′40.7″E
Jabal Ar Ra'alah	(Note: Alternative Names: Jebel Ar Ra'alah.)	031	Hajar Mountains	United Arab Emirates	Ras Al Khaimah	869	25°53′05.2″N 56°06′54.5″E
Jabal Bulaydah	(Note: Alternative Names: Jabal Bilaida, Jabal Bilaidah, Jabal Bulaidha, Jabal Bulaydah.)	032	Hajar Mountains	United Arab Emirates	Ras Al Khaimah	830	25°13′07.0″N 56°10′36.8″E
Jabal Wamm	(Note: Alternative Names: Jebel Wamm, Jabal Wam.)	033	Hajar Mountains	United Arab Emirates	Fujairah	825	25°36′04.5″N 56°11′59.0″E
Jabal Mimduk	(Note: Alternative Names: Jabal Mimdūk.)	034	Hajar Mountains	United Arab Emirates	Fujairah	808	25°08′26.6″N 56°11′10.6″E
Jabal Al Himri	(Note: Alternative Names: Jabal Al Ḩimrī, Jabal Al Hamri.)	035	Hajar Mountains	United Arab Emirates	Fujairah	803	25°34′33.2″N 56°09′16.8″E
Jabal Saddariyyah	(Note: Alternative Names: Jebel Saddariyyah.)	036	Hajar Mountains	United Arab Emirates; Oman	Ras Al Khaimah Musandam	795	26°03′04.0″N 56°07′19.2″E
Jabal Sall	(Note: Alternative Names: Jabal Sal, Jebel Sall.)	037	Hajar Mountains	United Arab Emirates	Ras Al Khaimah	778	25°45′41.0″N 56°05′16.8″E
Jabal Siha	(Note: Alternative Names: Jabal Şihā’, Jabal Siha'.)	038	Hajar Mountains	United Arab Emirates	Sharjah	770	25°20′20.0″N 56°16′36.0″E
Jabal Rams	(Note: Alternative Names: Jabal Rams, Jabal Bin Rams.)	039	Hajar Mountains	United Arab Emirates	Ras Al Khaimah	761	25°52′10.9″N 56°04′09.1″E
Jabal Qutayyib	(Note: Alternative Names: Jabal Qutayyib, Jabal Qatayib.)	040	Hajar Mountains	United Arab Emirates	Ras Al Khaimah	755	25°56′24.9″N 56°05′36.9″E

== See also ==
- List of mountains in Oman
- List of wadis of the United Arab Emirates
- List of wadis of Oman
- Geology of the United Arab Emirates
- Geography of the United Arab Emirates
