= Jebel Jais =

Mountain in Oman and the UAE

- Jabal Jays
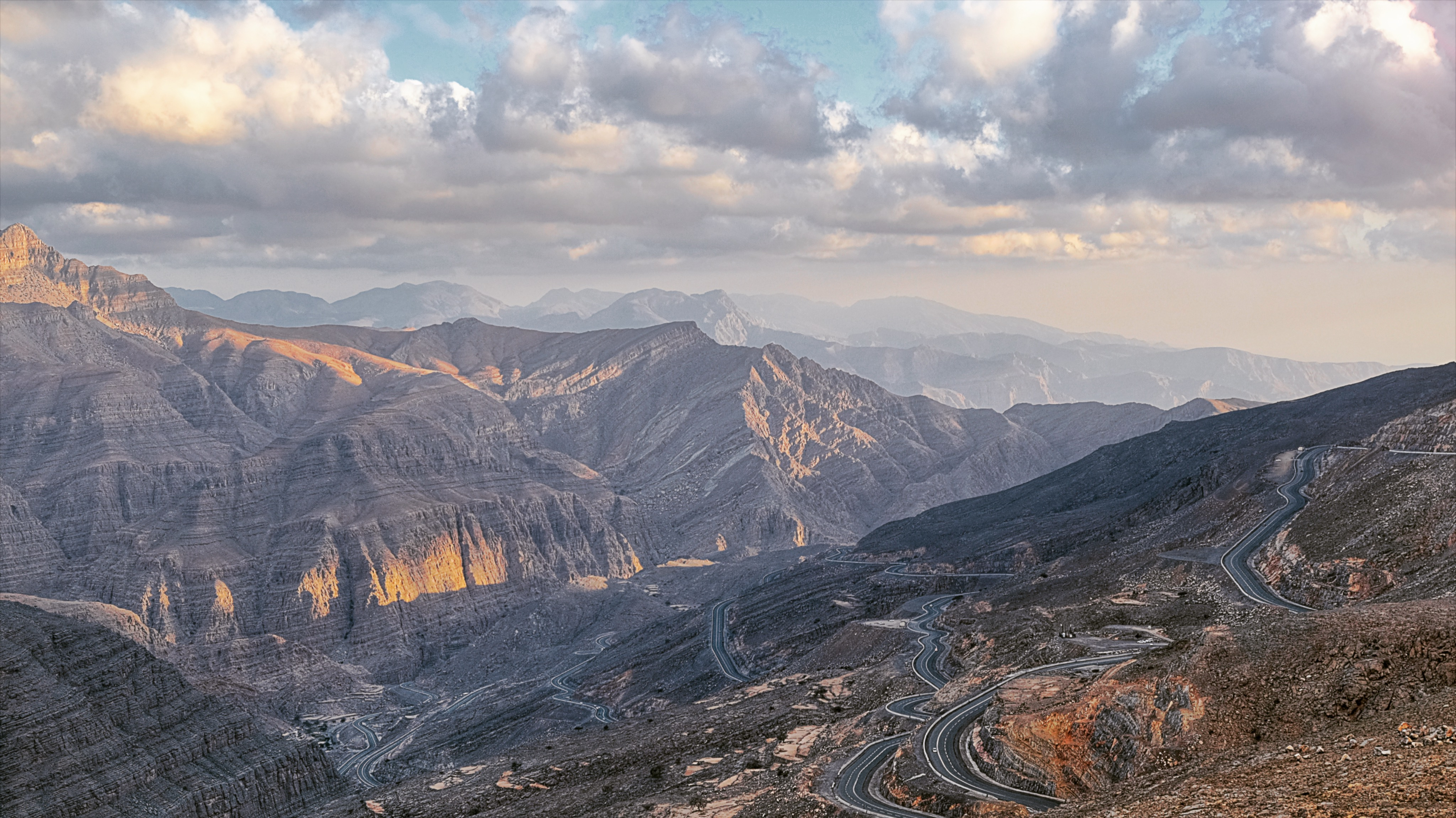
- The road leading to the top of Jebel Jais in Ras Al-Khaimah

Highest point
- Elevation: 1,934 m (6,345 ft)
- Prominence: 431 m (1,414 ft)
- Isolation: 4.92 km (3.06 mi)
- Listing: Country high point
- Coordinates: 25°57′11″N 56°11′03″E

Naming
- Native name: جَبَل جَيْس (Arabic)

Geography
- Location within United Arab Emirates Location within Oman Location within West and Central Asia
- Countries: United Arab Emirates and Oman
- Parent range: Al Hajar Mountains

Jebel Jais (Arabic: جبل جيس, romanized: Jabal Jays) is a mountain of the North-Western Hajar range in the Musandam Governorate of Oman and also in Ras Al Khaimah, United Arab Emirates. The summit has an elevation of 1,934 m (6,345 ft). The summit is located on the Omani side, but a high point west of this peak is considered the highest point in the United Arab Emirates, at 1,892 m (6,207 ft) above sea level, and with around 10m of prominence. Since the summit is on the Omani side, Jabal ar Raḩraḩ, at 1,691 m (5,548 ft), is the highest peak in the UAE, with significant prominence.

== Infrastructure ==
On the Omani side, the mountain is largely underdeveloped, inaccessible, and far from any development, however, on the United Arab Emirates side there has been a lot of development in recent years. A 36 km (22 miles) road has been built, which hairpins most of the way up the mountain on the United Arab Emirates side. Near the top of the road, there are parking places, food providers, toilets and a viewing platform. After a security checkpoint, the road continues up a few kilometers further to the world's longest zip-line and an Etisalat cell tower, as well as a large flat area used for outdoor shows and parking. New buildings are also being built along this road section, for use of the zip-line operating company. This section was completed towards the end of 2017; however, it remains closed to the public, by motorized vehicles, as of December 2019. A private brick road then continues further up, to Sheikh Saud Bin Saqr Al Qasimi's palace, which is situated near the UAE's highest point. The summit is then accessible by hiking, a short distance after the palace perimeter fence. The mountain is 100 kilometers in width and 700 kilometers in length. It is the highest mountain range in the region.

The road was completed by September 2019.

=== UAE Tour Road Cycling Race ===
The mountain, and the highway to its peak, feature prominently in the UAE Tour, an annual road cycling stage race, first held in 2019 as part of the UCI World Tour. Due to the difficulty of the long, steep climb, the stage that finishes here is usually considered the queen stage of the entire UAE Tour. Previous winners of the Jebel Jais stage include Grand Tour and UAE Tour winners Primož Roglič and Tadej Pogačar.

=== Jebel Jais zip-line ===
The world's longest zip-line opened on the mountain in February 2018. It is 2,832 m (9,291 ft) long, and users travel at speeds of up to 150 km/h (93 mph), There are, or have been, plans in place to build a hotel, cable car, paragliding launch ramp, golf course and ski slope following the opening of the road. The cost is around $98 to $122 or €89 to €111.

== Climate ==
The temperature of Ras Al Khaimah tends to be lower than in other parts of the country. Temperatures as low as -5 °C have been measured at the top of the mountain in winter. Sometimes humidity level is likely to increase during night and early morning over some coastal and internal areas. The temperatures at the highest elevations on the mountain tend to be lower than other parts of the United Arab Emirates, by about ten degrees, except for spots such as the mountains of Hafeet, Yibir, Yanas and Al-Heben.

Climate data for Jebel Jais (2003–2021)
Month	Jan	Feb	Mar	Apr	May	Jun	Jul	Aug	Sep	Oct	Nov	Dec	Year
Record high °C (°F)	21.1 (70.0)	22.2 (72.0)	27.7 (81.9)	29.0 (84.2)	34.1 (93.4)	36.5 (97.7)	35.0 (95.0)	34.9 (94.8)	33.1 (91.6)	29.0 (84.2)	23.7 (74.7)	23.0 (73.4)	36.5 (97.7)
Mean daily maximum °C (°F)	11.2 (52.2)	13.2 (55.8)	17.1 (62.8)	21.6 (70.9)	26.6 (79.9)	30.2 (86.4)	30.5 (86.9)	29.8 (85.6)	27.6 (81.7)	23.1 (73.6)	17.0 (62.6)	13.3 (55.9)	21.8 (71.2)
Daily mean °C (°F)	8.8 (47.8)	10.7 (51.3)	14.4 (57.9)	18.9 (66.0)	23.7 (74.7)	27.4 (81.3)	27.6 (81.7)	27.0 (80.6)	24.8 (76.6)	20.2 (68.4)	14.3 (57.7)	10.7 (51.3)	19.0 (66.3)
Mean daily minimum °C (°F)	6.4 (43.5)	8.1 (46.6)	11.7 (53.1)	16.2 (61.2)	21.1 (70.0)	24.7 (76.5)	24.9 (76.8)	24.5 (76.1)	22.3 (72.1)	17.8 (64.0)	11.9 (53.4)	8.3 (46.9)	16.5 (61.7)
Record low °C (°F)	−0.3 (31.5)	−5.7 (21.7)	1.2 (34.2)	5.0 (41.0)	9.0 (48.2)	16.4 (61.5)	17.8 (64.0)	17.8 (64.0)	16.5 (61.7)	11.2 (52.2)	4.1 (39.4)	−0.7 (30.7)	−5.7 (21.7)
Average rainfall mm (inches)	29.2 (1.15)	15.1 (0.59)	32.4 (1.28)	15.3 (0.60)	0.4 (0.02)	0.0 (0.0)	0.3 (0.01)	0.6 (0.02)	0.2 (0.01)	5.8 (0.23)	14.5 (0.57)	15.2 (0.60)	129 (5.08)
Average relative humidity (%)	51	44	35	31	27	24	31	32	28	34	48	51	36
Source: National Center of Meteorology

=== Snow fall ===
In January 2009 there was snow on Jebel Jais. This was only the second time snow had been reported in the history of United Arab Emirates, previously having only been seen in 2004. There was less on this occasion. In February 2017 it snowed again on Jebel Jais and the temperatures fell down-to -5 degrees Celsius. In January 2020 a mix of snow and hail covered the mountain with the temperature dropping below zero degrees.

== Gallery ==
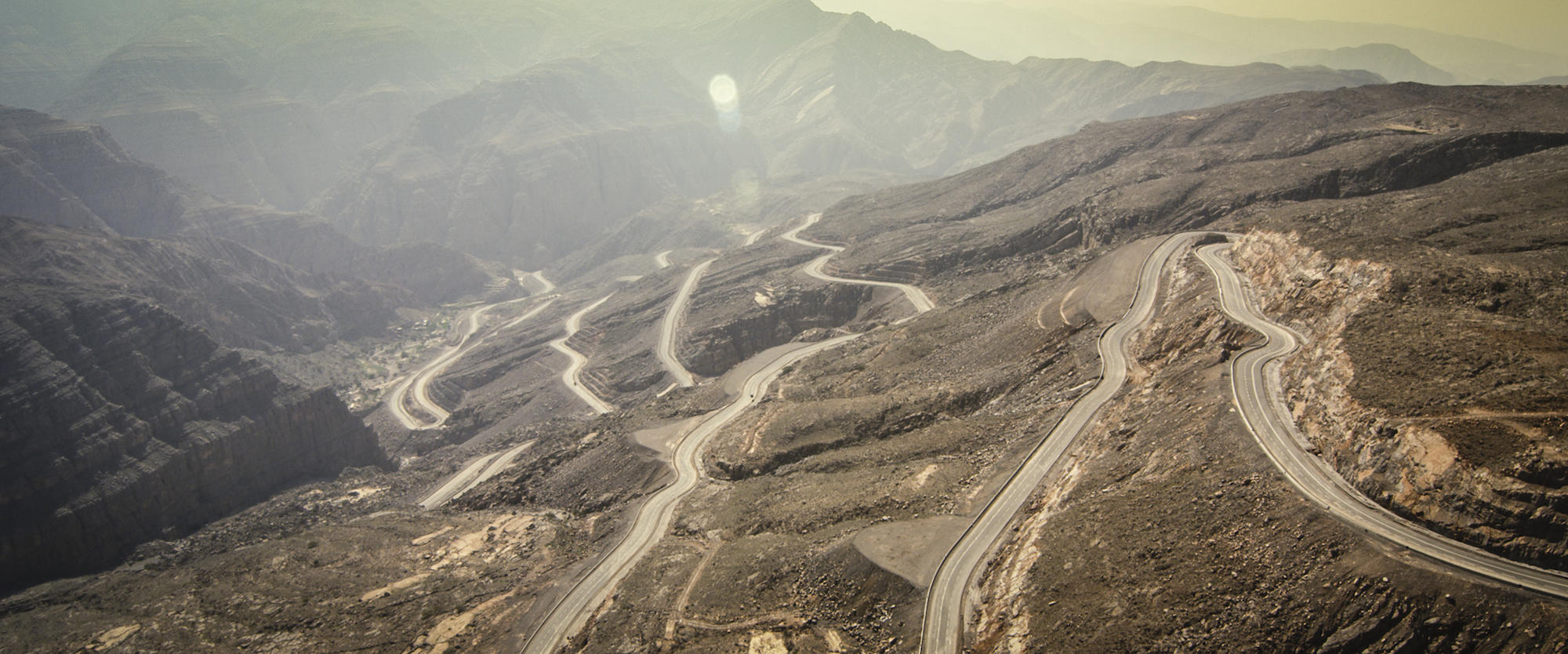
Hairpins

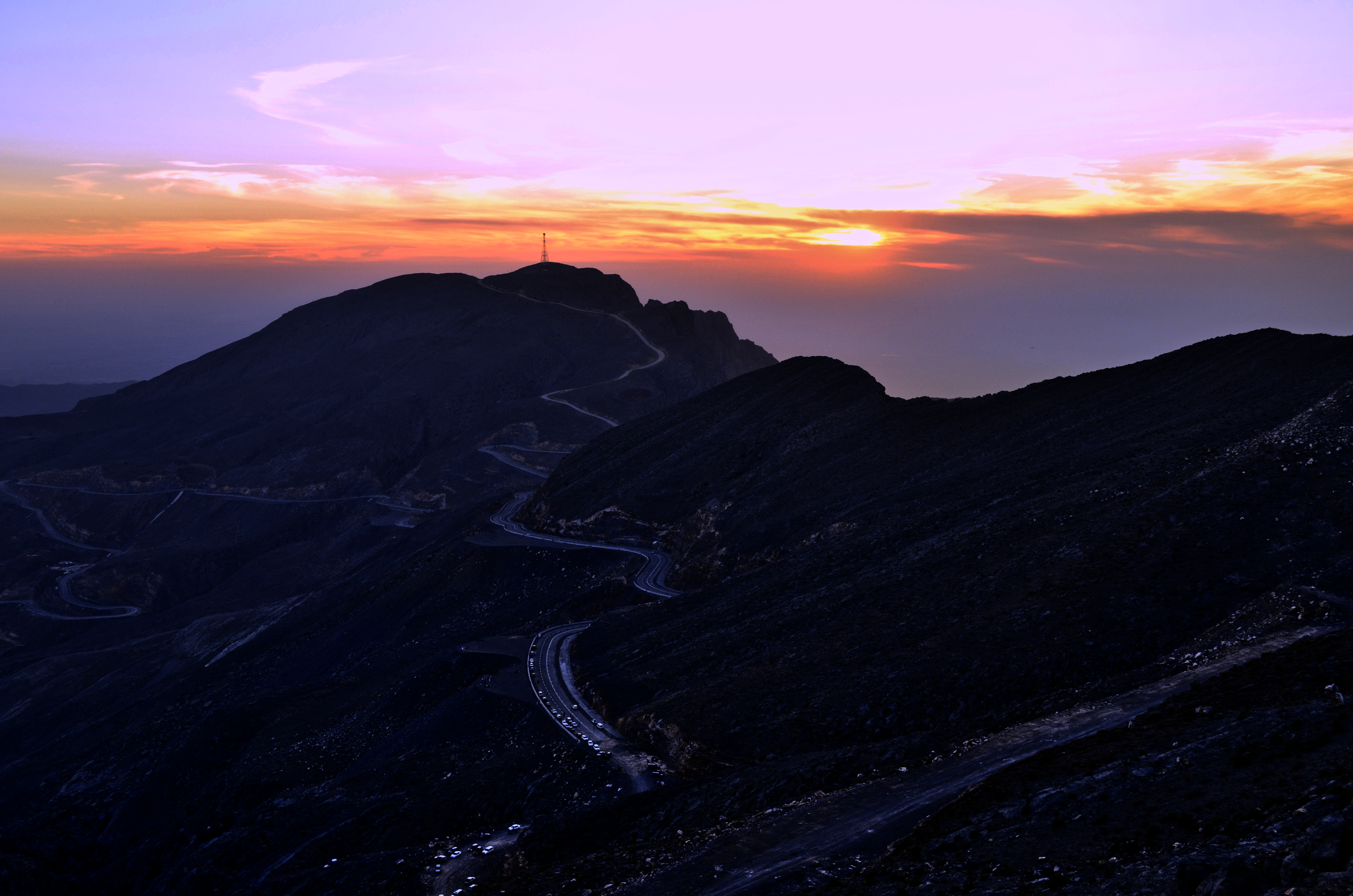
View from the Jabal Jais Road

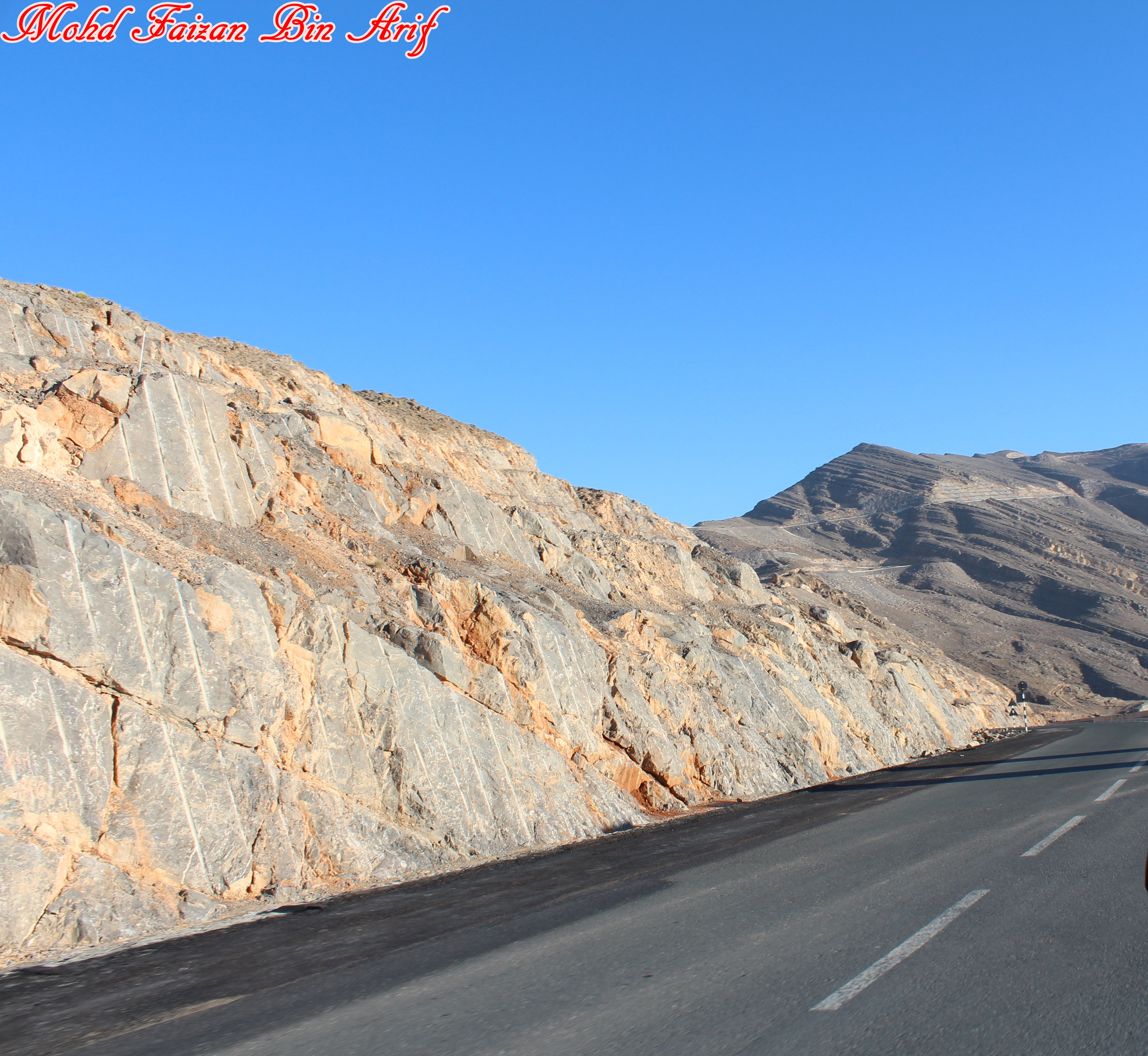

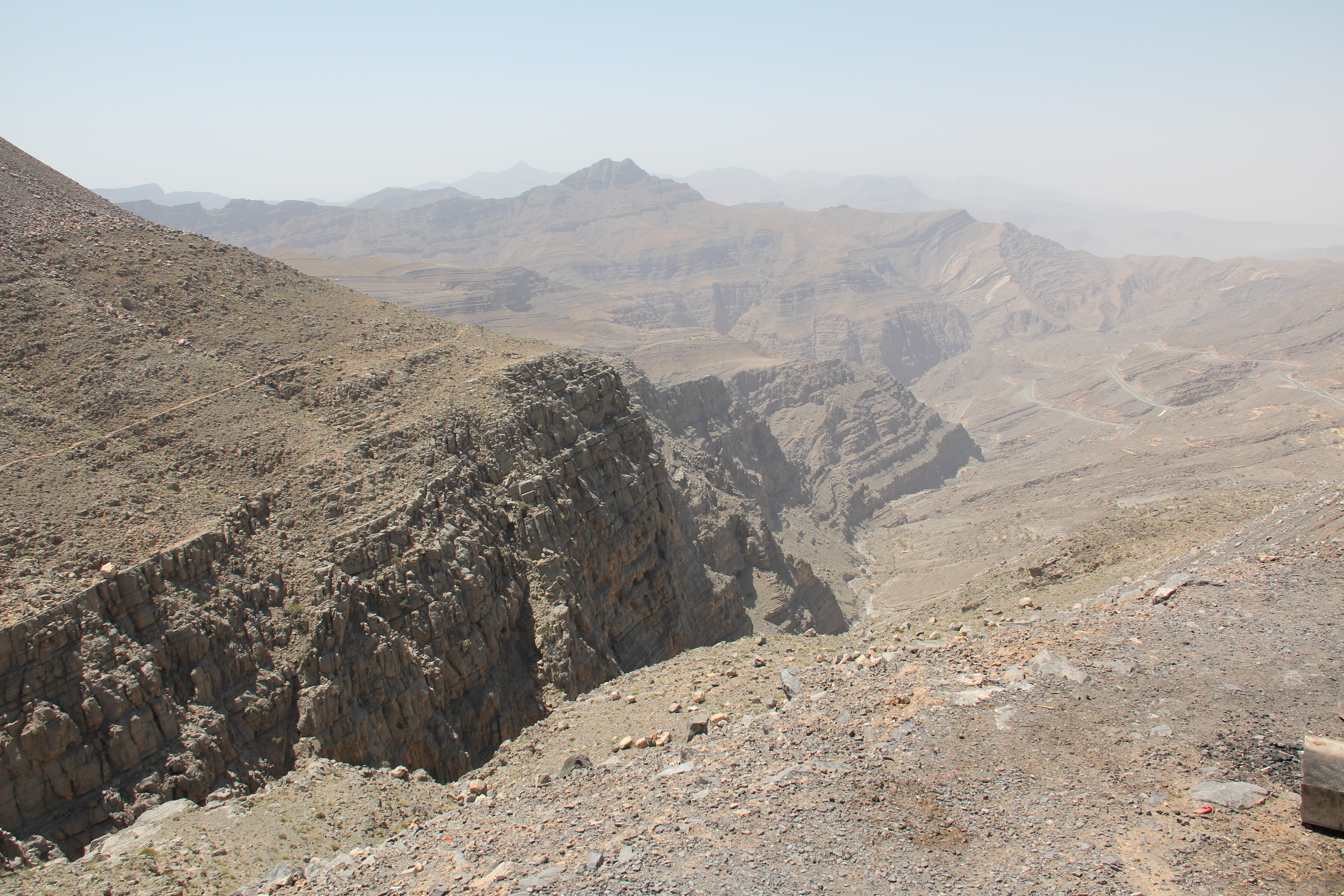

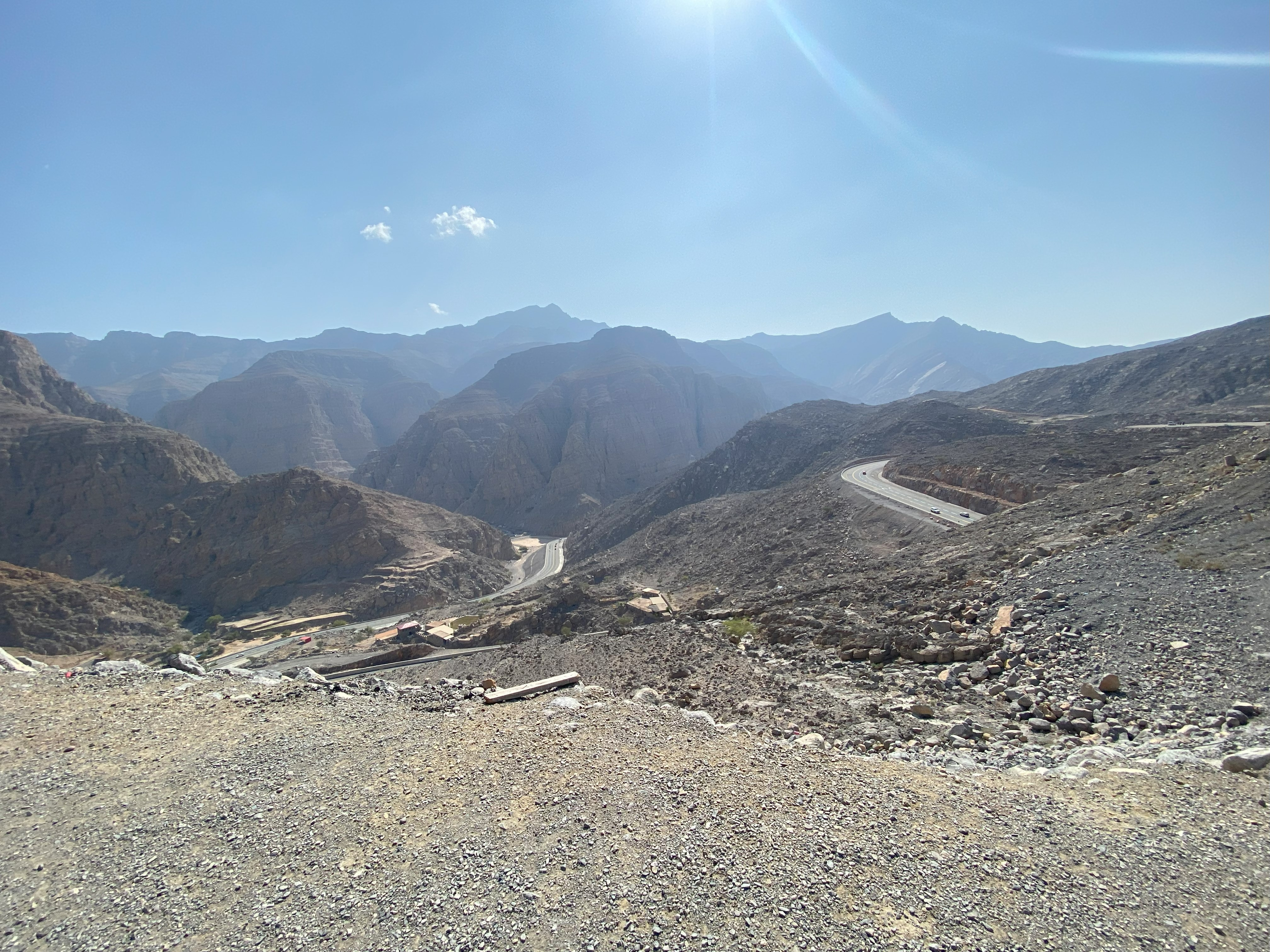
Jebel Jais Mountain Ranges as viewed from Ras Al Khaimah

== See also ==
- Geography of Oman
- Geography of the United Arab Emirates
- List of countries by highest point
- List of tourist attractions in the United Arab Emirates
- Wadi Bih
- Wildlife of Oman
- Wildlife of the United Arab Emirates
- Ras Al Khaimah
