= Geography of Oman =

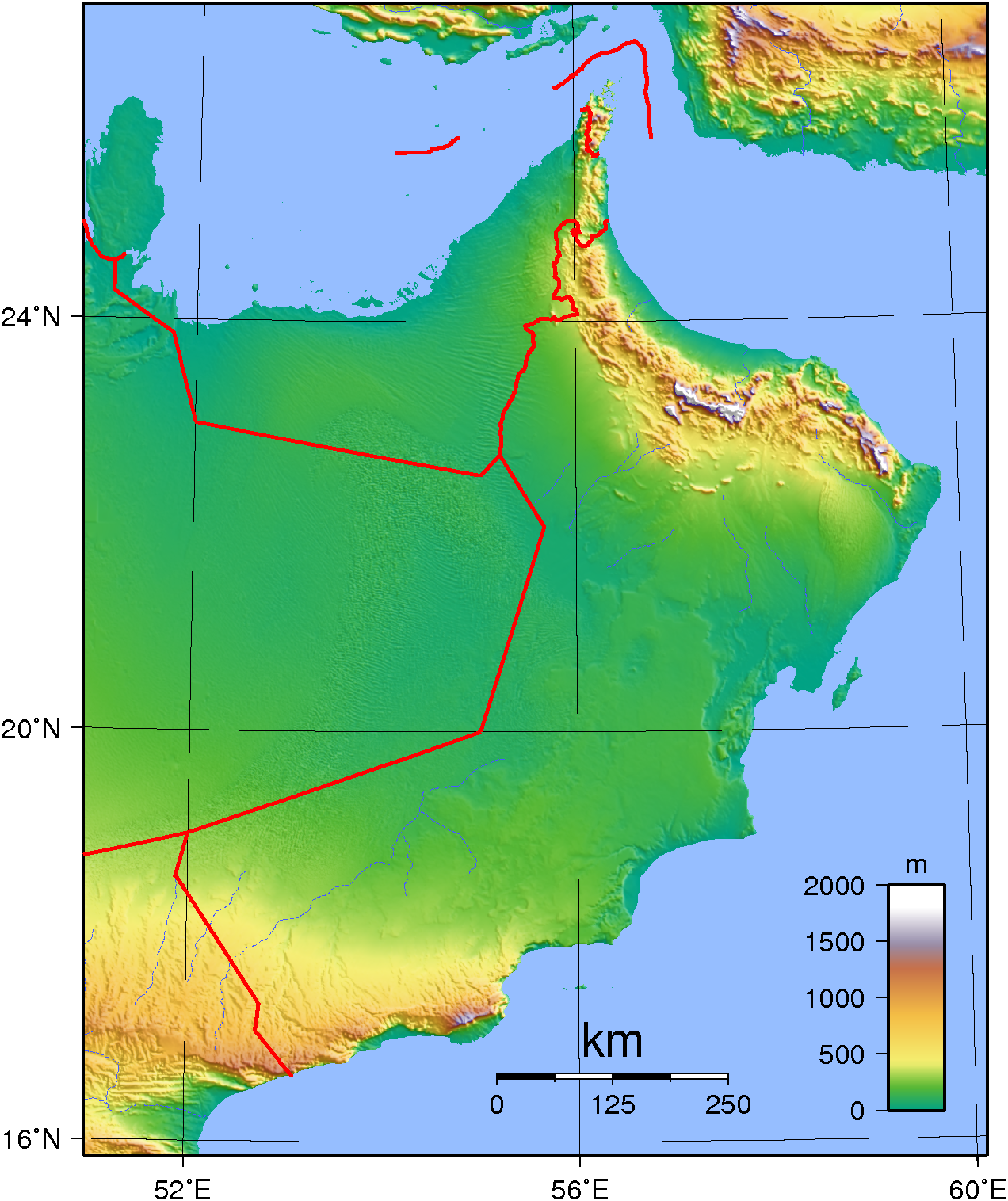
- Continent: Asia
- Region: West Asia
- Coordinates: 21°00′N 57°00′E
- Area: Ranked 69th
  - Total: 315,331 km^{2} (121,750 sq mi)
  - Land: 100%
  - Water: 0%
- Coastline: 3,165 km (1,967 mi)
- Borders: Land borders: Saudi Arabia: 676 km (420 mi); United Arab Emirates: 410 km (250 mi); Yemen: 288 km (179 mi); Maritime borders: Iran: Gulf of Oman, Persian Gulf and Strait of Hormuz; Pakistan: Arabian Sea and Gulf of Oman; India: Arabian Sea
- Highest point: Jebel Shams; 3,008 metres (9,869 ft)
- Lowest point: Arabian Sea sea level
- Natural resources: petroleum, copper, asbestos, Limited marble, limestone, chromium, gypsum, natural gas
- Natural hazards: Large sandstorms in interior in summer; large floods after rains; tropical cyclones
- Environmental issues: Soil salinity rising; oil spills; very limited fresh water resources
- Exclusive economic zone: 533,180 km^{2} (205,862 mi^{2})

Oman is a country on the southeast coast of the Arabian Peninsula, situated in West Asia, bordering the Arabian Sea, Gulf of Oman, and Persian Gulf, between Yemen and the United Arab Emirates (UAE). The coast of Oman was an important part in the Omani empire and sultanate.

== Location ==
Oman is located in the southeastern quarter of the Arabian Peninsula and covers a total land area of 315,331 km^{2} (121,750 sq mi). The land area is composed of varying topographic features: valleys and desert account for 82 percent of the land mass; mountain ranges, 15 percent; and the coastal plain, 3 percent. The sultanate is flanked by the Gulf of Oman, the Arabian Sea, and the Rub' al Khali (Empty Quarter) of Saudi Arabia, all of which contributed to Oman's isolation. Historically, the country's contacts with the rest of the world were by sea, which not only provided access to foreign lands but also linked the coastal towns of Oman. The Rub' al-Khali, difficult to cross even with modern desert transport, formed a barrier between the sultanate and the Arabian interior. The Hajar Mountains, which form a belt between the coast and the desert from the Musandam Peninsula (Ras Musandam) to the city of Sur, almost at Oman's easternmost point, formed another barrier. These geographic barriers kept the interior of Oman free from foreign military encroachments. The southwestern corner of Oman's exclusive economic zone is situated a few miles off the Puntland-adjacent Yemeni archipelago of Socotra, which lies amidst the Guardafui Channel and the Somali Sea to the south.

== Geographical regions ==
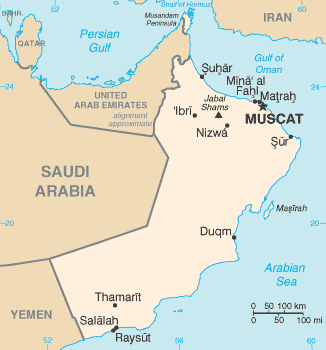
Map of Oman

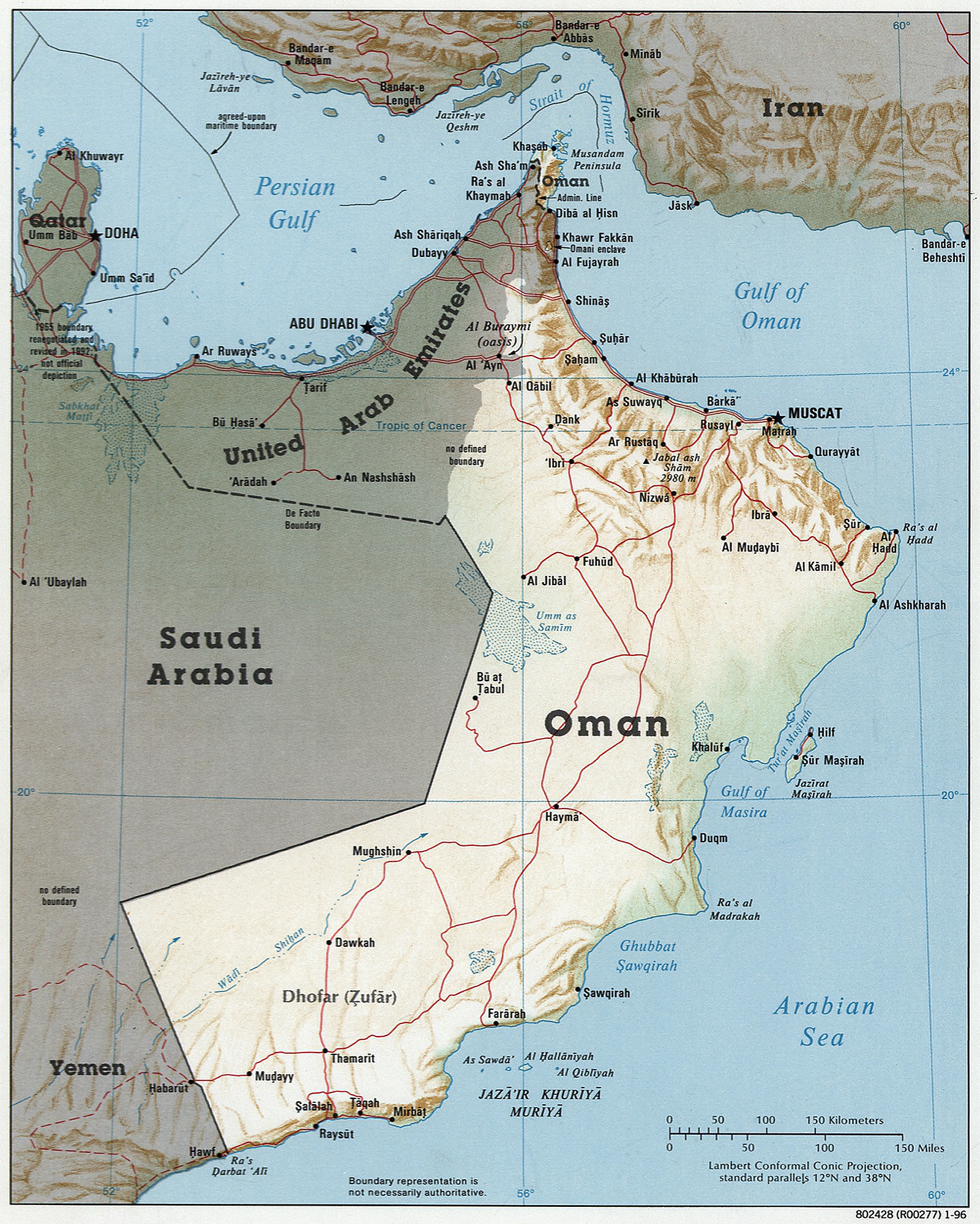
Detailed map of Oman

Natural features divide the country into six distinct areas: Ru'us al-Jibal, including the northern Musandam Peninsula; the Batinah plain running southeast along the Gulf of Oman coast; the Oman interior behind the Batinah coast comprising the Hajar Mountains, their foothills, and desert fringes; the coast from Muscat-Matrah around the point of Ras Al Hadd, and down the Arabian Sea; the offshore island of Masirah; and finally the barren coastline south to the Dhofar region in the south.

Except for the foggy and fertile Dhofar, all of the coast and the lowlands around the Hajar mountains are part of the Gulf of Oman desert and semi-desert ecoregion, while the mountains themselves are a distinct habitat.

=== Musandam Governorate ===
The northernmost area, Musandam, extends from the tip of the Musandam Peninsula to the boundary with the United Arab Emirates (UAE) at Hisn al-Dibba. It borders the Strait of Hormuz, which links the Persian Gulf with the Gulf of Oman, and is separated from the rest of the sultanate by a strip of territory belonging to the UAE. This area consists of low mountains forming the northernmost extremity of the Western Hajar. Two inlets, Elphinstone (Khawr ash-Shamm) and Malcom (Ghubbat al-Ghazirah), cleave the coastline about one third of the distance from the Strait of Hormuz and at one point are separated by only a few hundred meters of land. The coastline is extremely rugged, and the Elphinstone Inlet, 16 kilometres (9.9 miles) long and surrounded by cliffs 1,000 to 1,250 m (3,280 to 4,100 ft) high, has frequently been compared with fjords in Norway.

=== Al-Batinah Plain ===
The UAE territory separating Ru'us al Jibal from the rest of Oman extends almost as far south as the coastal town of Shinas. A narrow, well-populated coastal plain known as Al-Batinah runs from the point at which the sultanate is re-entered to the town of As-Sib, about 140 km (87 miles) to the southeast, split into two Wilayats, Al Batinah North and Al Batinah South. Across the plains, a number of wadis, heavily populated in their upper courses, descend from the Western Hajar Mountains to the south. A ribbon of oases, watered by wells and underground channels (aflaj), extends the length of the plain, about 10 km (33,000 ft) inland.

=== Muscat-Matrah coastal area ===
South of As Sib, the coast changes character. For about 175 km (109 miles), from As-Sib to Ras al-Hadd, it is barren and bounded by cliffs almost its entire length; there is no cultivation and little habitation. Although the deep water off this coast renders navigation relatively easy, there are few natural harbors or safe anchorages. The two best are at Muscat and Matrah, where natural harbors facilitated the growth of cities centuries ago.

=== Al-Sharqiyah ===
Al Sharqiyah is the northeastern region of the Sultanate of Oman and overlooks the Arabian Sea to the east and includes the inner side of the Eastern Hijr Mountains.
The region consists of the following governorates:

1. South Al Sharqiyah: The province of Sur is its administrative capital in addition to the provinces of Jalan Bani Bu Ali and Jalan Bani Bu Hassan, Kamel and Alwafi and Masirah.
2. North Al Sharqiyah: The province of Ibra is its administrative capital in addition to the provinces of Bidiyah, Al-Mudhaibi, Qabil, Wadi Bani Khalid, Damma and Al-Tayyeen.

=== Coastal tract, and island of Masirah ===
The desolate coastal tract from Jalan to Ras Naws has no specific name. Low hills and wastelands meet the sea for long distances. Midway along this coast and about fifteen kilometers offshore is the barren Masirah Island. Stretching about 70 km (43 miles), the island occupies a strategic location near the entry point to the Gulf of Oman from the Arabian Sea. Because of its location, it became the site of military facilities used first by the British and then by the United States, following an access agreement signed in 1980 by the United States and Oman.

=== Oman Governorate ===
West of the coastal areas lies the tableland of central Oman. The Wadi Samail (the largest wadi in the mountain zone), a valley that forms the traditional route between Muscat and the interior divides the Hajar range into two subranges: Al-Ḥajar Al-Gharbī (The Western Hajar) and Al-Ḥajar Ash-Sharqī (The Eastern Hajar). At the same time, mountains in the central region, where the highest of the Hajar are located, are recognised as the "Central Hajar". The general elevation is about 1,200 m (3,900 ft), but the peaks of the high ridge known as Jebel Akhdar ("Green Mountain"), rise to more than 3,000 m (1.9 miles). Jabal Akhdar is a home of the Arabian tahr, a unique species of wild goat. In the hope of saving this rare animal, Sultan Qabus ibn Said has declared part of the mountain a national park. Behind the Western Mountains are two inland regions, Az-Zahirah and Inner Oman, separated by the lateral range of the Rub al Khali. Adjoining the Eastern Hajar Mountains are the sandy regions of Ash-Sharqiyah and Jalan, which also border the desert.

=== Dhofar Governorate ===
Dhofar region extends from Ras ash-Sharbatat to the border of Yemen and north to the clearly defined border with Saudi Arabia. Its capital, Salalah, was the permanent residence of Sultan Said ibn Taimur Al Said and the birthplace of the present sultan, Qaboos ibn Said. The highest peak of the Dhofar Mountains, Jabal Samhan, is about 2,000 metres (1.2 miles). The coast of Dhofar is fertile, being watered by monsoonal fogs from the Indian Ocean and is part of the Arabian Peninsula coastal fog desert ecoregion.

Al Dharerah region consists of three parts: Dhank, Ibri and Yanqul.

== Climate ==
Oman Köppen climate classification map

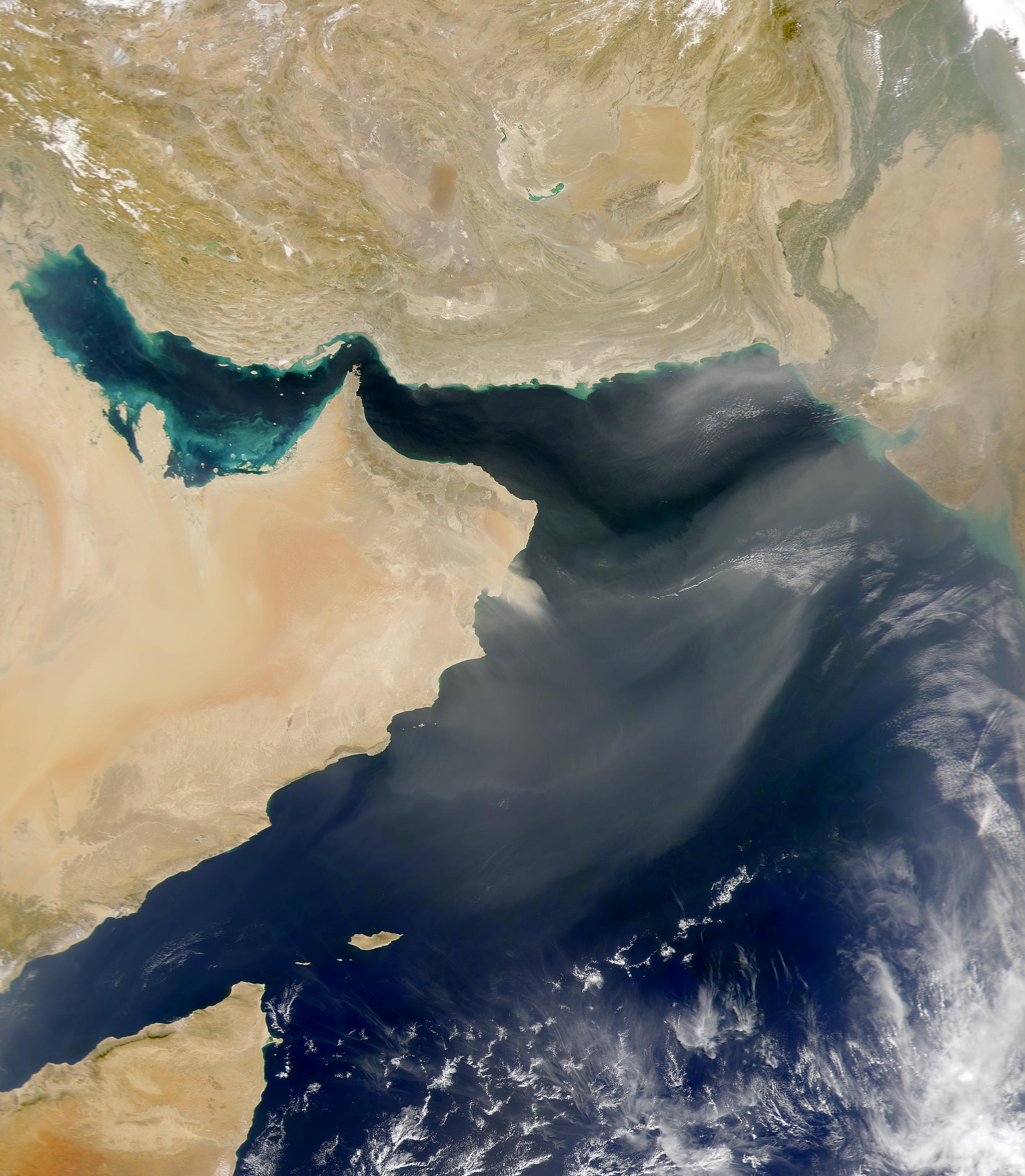
SeaWiFS captured this dust cloud blowing out over the Arabian Sea from Oman. 12 March 2000

Oman is the fourteenth most water stressed country in the world.

According to the Köppen climate classification, Oman has four different climates (BWh, BWk, BSk, BSh), however is highly dominated by the BWh (hot desert) climate.

With the exception of Dhofari region, which has a strong monsoon climate and receives warm winds from the Indian Ocean, the climate of Oman is extremely hot and dry most of the year.

Summer begins in March and lasts until September. The highest temperatures are registered in the interior, where readings up to a maximum of 49.8 °C (121.6 °F) have been recorded. On the Batinah coastal plain, summer temperatures seldom exceed 47 °C (116.6 °F), but, because of the low elevation, the humidity may be as high as 90 percent. The mean summer temperature in Muscat is 33 °C (91.4 °F), but the gharbī (Arabic: غَرْبِي, lit. 'western'), a strong wind that blows from the Rub' al-Khali, can raise temperatures from the towns on the Gulf of Oman by 6 °C (10.8 °F) to 10 °C (18 °F).

Winter temperatures in December and January are mild and pleasant, ranging between 18 and 26 °C (64.4 and 78.8 °F).

Precipitation on the coasts and on the interior plains ranges from 20 to 100 millimeters (0.8 to 3.9 in) a year and falls during mid- and late winter. Rainfall in the mountains, particularly over Jebel Akhdar, is much higher and may reach 900 millimeters (35.4 in).

Because the plateau of Jebel Akhdar is porous limestone, rainfall seeps quickly through it, and the vegetation, which might be expected to be more lush, is meager. However, a huge reservoir under the plateau provides springs for low-lying areas. In addition, an enormous wadi channels water to these valleys, making the area agriculturally productive in years of good rainfall.

Dhofar, benefiting from a southwest monsoon between June and September, receives heavier rainfall and has constantly running streams, which make the region Oman's most fertile area.

Occasionally, a cyclone from the North Indian Ocean makes landfall, bringing with it heavy rain, such as Cyclone Kelia did in 2011. Oman was hit by Cyclone Gonu on 6 June. Large areas in the capital area region in the Governorate of Muscat and in Amerat and Quriyat were severely affected. Gonu first hit the southern city of Sur late on 5 June 2007. Cyclone Mekunu is the strongest and only major cyclone to make landfall in the nation or indeed the entire Arabian Peninsula.

Climate data for Muscat
Month	Jan	Feb	Mar	Apr	May	Jun	Jul	Aug	Sep	Oct	Nov	Dec	Year
Record high °C (°F)	34.6 (94.3)	38.2 (100.8)	41.5 (106.7)	44.9 (112.8)	48.3 (118.9)	48.5 (119.3)	49.1 (120.4)	49.2 (120.6)	47.2 (117.0)	43.6 (110.5)	39.4 (102.9)	37.8 (100.0)	49.2 (120.6)
Mean daily maximum °C (°F)	25.5 (77.9)	26.1 (79.0)	29.8 (85.6)	34.7 (94.5)	39.5 (103.1)	40.4 (104.7)	38.6 (101.5)	36.2 (97.2)	36.3 (97.3)	35.0 (95.0)	30.5 (86.9)	27.1 (80.8)	33.3 (92.0)
Daily mean °C (°F)	21.3 (70.3)	21.9 (71.4)	25.2 (77.4)	29.8 (85.6)	34.2 (93.6)	35.2 (95.4)	34.3 (93.7)	32.0 (89.6)	31.4 (88.5)	29.7 (85.5)	25.7 (78.3)	22.6 (72.7)	28.6 (83.5)
Mean daily minimum °C (°F)	17.3 (63.1)	17.6 (63.7)	20.7 (69.3)	24.7 (76.5)	29.1 (84.4)	30.6 (87.1)	30.4 (86.7)	28.4 (83.1)	27.5 (81.5)	24.9 (76.8)	20.9 (69.6)	18.9 (66.0)	24.3 (75.7)
Record low °C (°F)	1.6 (34.9)	2.3 (36.1)	7.0 (44.6)	10.3 (50.5)	17.2 (63.0)	21.6 (70.9)	23.5 (74.3)	21.3 (70.3)	19.0 (66.2)	14.3 (57.7)	9.4 (48.9)	4.5 (40.1)	1.6 (34.9)
Average precipitation mm (inches)	12.8 (0.50)	24.5 (0.96)	15.9 (0.63)	17.1 (0.67)	7.0 (0.28)	0.9 (0.04)	0.2 (0.01)	0.8 (0.03)	0.0 (0.0)	1.0 (0.04)	6.8 (0.27)	13.3 (0.52)	100.3 (3.95)
Average relative humidity (%)	63	64	58	45	42	49	60	67	63	55	60	65	58
Mean monthly sunshine hours	268.6	244.8	278.3	292.5	347.4	325.7	277.7	278.6	303.9	316.9	291.9	267.0	3,493.3
Source: NOAA (1961–1990)

Climate data for Salalah
Month	Jan	Feb	Mar	Apr	May	Jun	Jul	Aug	Sep	Oct	Nov	Dec	Year
Record high °C (°F)	32.3 (90.1)	33.8 (92.8)	36.7 (98.1)	43.6 (110.5)	42.3 (108.1)	43.0 (109.4)	32.7 (90.9)	31.3 (88.3)	33.0 (91.4)	40.1 (104.2)	37.4 (99.3)	34.2 (93.6)	43.6 (110.5)
Mean daily maximum °C (°F)	27.5 (81.5)	27.9 (82.2)	29.9 (85.8)	31.7 (89.1)	32.4 (90.3)	31.8 (89.2)	28.4 (83.1)	27.3 (81.1)	29.0 (84.2)	30.5 (86.9)	30.8 (87.4)	28.7 (83.7)	29.7 (85.4)
Daily mean °C (°F)	22.9 (73.2)	23.7 (74.7)	25.5 (77.9)	27.6 (81.7)	29.0 (84.2)	29.0 (84.2)	26.4 (79.5)	25.2 (77.4)	26.3 (79.3)	26.3 (79.3)	25.9 (78.6)	23.9 (75.0)	26.0 (78.7)
Mean daily minimum °C (°F)	17.9 (64.2)	19.2 (66.6)	21.0 (69.8)	23.4 (74.1)	25.6 (78.1)	26.5 (79.7)	24.2 (75.6)	23.1 (73.6)	23.4 (74.1)	21.6 (70.9)	20.4 (68.7)	18.8 (65.8)	22.1 (71.8)
Record low °C (°F)	12.6 (54.7)	10.8 (51.4)	14.5 (58.1)	18.0 (64.4)	20.6 (69.1)	23.5 (74.3)	21.9 (71.4)	20.5 (68.9)	19.1 (66.4)	16.5 (61.7)	15.0 (59.0)	14.1 (57.4)	10.8 (51.4)
Average precipitation mm (inches)	2.2 (0.09)	7.0 (0.28)	6.3 (0.25)	19.8 (0.78)	17.1 (0.67)	10.6 (0.42)	24.6 (0.97)	24.5 (0.96)	4.1 (0.16)	4.1 (0.16)	9.6 (0.38)	1.1 (0.04)	131 (5.16)
Average relative humidity (%)	50	58	62	68	75	80	89	90	81	67	55	50	69
Mean monthly sunshine hours	289.6	256.8	297.6	308.3	335.1	199.5	43.9	42.4	188.0	314.7	304.7	296.8	2,877.4
Source: NOAA (period of record varies, see source)

== Area and boundaries ==
Area
- total: 315,331 km^{2} (121,750 sq mi)
  - country rank in the world: 69th
Area comparative
- Australia comparative: slightly more than 1 1/3 times the size of Victoria
- Canada comparative: slightly less than 1/2 the size of Manitoba
- EU comparative: approximately the size of Poland
- United Kingdom comparative: approximately 2/7 larger than the United Kingdom
- United States comparative: approximately the size of New Mexico
Land boundaries
- border countries:
  - Saudi Arabia: 676 km (420 mi)
  - United Arab Emirates: 410 km (250 mi)
  - Yemen: 288 km (179 mi)
Coastline
- 3,165 km (1,967 mi)
Maritime claims
- territorial sea: 12 nmi (13.8 mi; 22.2 km)
- contiguous zone: 24 nmi (27.6 mi; 44.4 km)
- exclusive economic zone: 533,180 km^{2} (205,862 mi^{2}) and 200 nmi (230.2 mi; 370.4 km)

== Resources and land use ==
- Natural resources: petroleum, copper, asbestos, Limited marble, limestone, chromium, gypsum, natural gas
- Land use:
  - arable land: 0.1%
  - permanent crops: 0.12%
  - other: 99.77% (2011)
- Irrigated land: 558.4 km^{2} (215.6 sq mi) (2004)
- Total renewable water resources: 1.4 km^{3} (0.34 cu mi) (2011)

== Environment ==
- Natural hazards: Summer winds often raise large sandstorms and dust storms in the interior during periodic droughts. Following rain, wadis can fill with rainwater water and vast tracts of land can be flooded. A cyclone making landfall can severely flood large areas, or blow sand all over the place.
- Environment – current issues: Drought and limited rainfall contribute to shortages in the nation's water supply. Maintaining an adequate supply of water for agricultural and domestic use is one of Oman's most pressing environmental problems, with limited renewable water resources. 94% of available water is used in farming and 2% for industrial activity, with the majority sourced from fossil water in the desert areas and spring water in hills and mountains. The soil in the coastal plains, such as Salalah, have shown increased levels of salinity, due to over exploitation of ground water and encroachment by seawater on the water table. Pollution of beaches and other coastal areas by oil tanker traffic through the Strait of Hormuz and Gulf of Oman is also a persistent concern.
- Geographical note: Oman is in a strategic location on Musandam Peninsula adjacent to Strait of Hormuz, a vital transit point for world crude oil.

== See also ==
- Geography of Qatar
- Geography of Saudi Arabia
- Geography of the United Arab Emirates
- Geography of Yemen
