= Jibjat =

Jibjat جِبْجَات (in Arabic)
- Village
- Location in Oman
- Coordinates: 17°15′N 54°30′E
- Country: Oman
- Governorate: Dhofar Governorate

Population (2020-12-12)
  - Total: 1,192
- Time zone: UTC+4 (Oman Standard Time)

Jibjat (Arabic: جِبْجَات) is a village in Taqah Province, Dhofar Governorate, in southwestern Oman. As of the 2020 Omani census, it had a population of 1,192.

== See also ==
- Dhofar Mountains
