= Salsola drummondii =

Scientific classification
- Kingdom: Plantae
- Clade: Tracheophytes
- Clade: Angiosperms
- Clade: Eudicots
- Order: Caryophyllales
- Family: Amaranthaceae
- Genus: Salsola
- Species: S. drummondii

Binomial name
- Salsola drummondii Ulbr.

Synonyms
- Soda drummondii (Ulbr.) Akhani; Salsola obpyrifolia Botsch. & Akhani

Species of flowering plant

Salsola drummondii, common name Drummond's saltwort, is a flowering plant that grows in the Eastern Arabian peninsula, Iran, and parts of south Asia. It grows in dry biomes. It is in the Amaranthaceae family. It is adapted to high salinity.

== See also ==
- Wildlife of Oman
