= Wildlife of Oman =

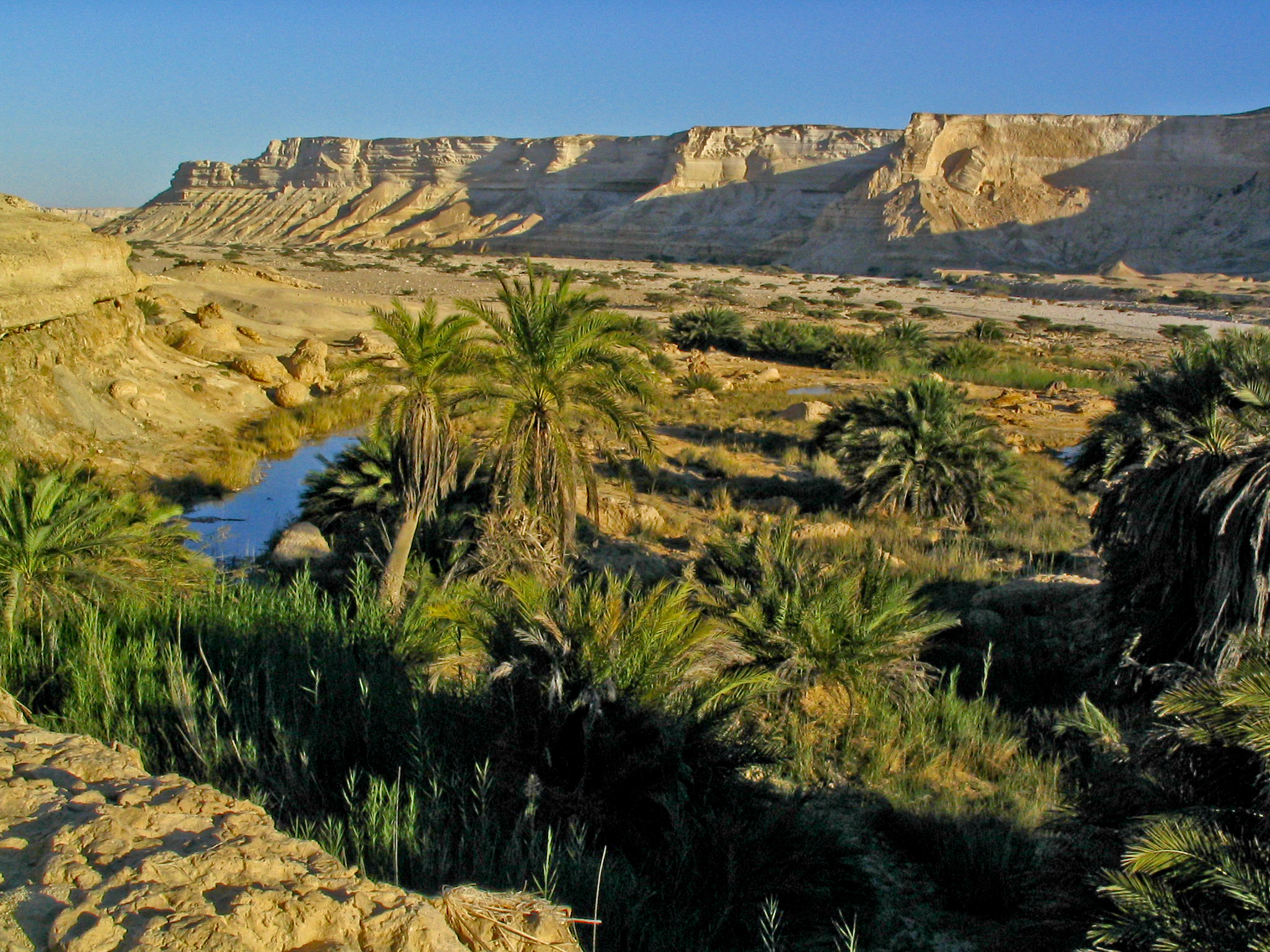
Oasis in an Oman desert landscape

The wildlife of Oman is the flora and fauna of this country in the southeastern corner of the Arabian Peninsula, with coasts on the Gulf of Oman and the Arabian Sea. The climate is hot and dry, apart from the southeastern coast, and the country offers a variety of habitats for wildlife including mountains, valleys, deserts, coastal plains and sea coasts.

== Geography ==
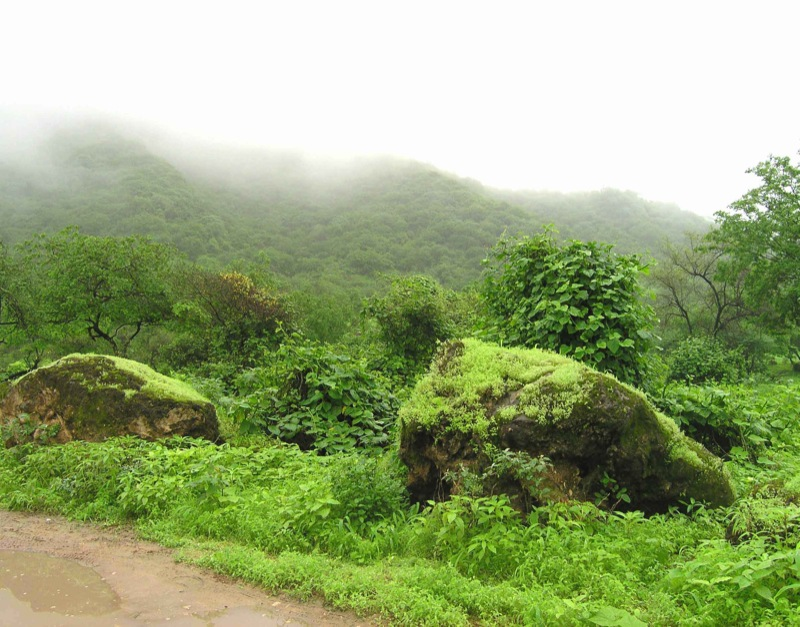
Fog-shrouded Dhofar Mountains in southern Oman, near Salalah

To the north of the country is a small exclave with a rugged coastline beside the Strait of Hormuz. This is the Musandam Peninsula, and is separated from the rest of Oman by part of the United Arab Emirates. The country in the north of the main part of Oman is mountainous, Al Hajar Mountains reaching almost to 3,000 m (10,000 ft). They run parallel to the coast of the Gulf of Oman, with a narrow coastal plain in between. This is crossed by a number of wadis and has several oases. Central Oman consists of a tableland bounded to the west by the Rub' al Khali desert of Saudi Arabia. The coastline in eastern and southern Oman is barren. In the south of the country in the Dhofar Governorate, the mountains run in an easterly-westerly direction and include Jabal Samhan and Jebel Qamar.

The climate in general is very hot, with temperatures rising to 40 °C (104 °F) or more in mid-summer. About 25 cm (10 in) of rain falls annually in the Hajar Mountains in the north but the bulk of the country is very dry, with the exception of the southeastern coastal area which is humid and is subject to the khareef, a seasonal southeastern monsoon that brings rain and fog to coastal areas. In the summer, the weather pattern over the whole of the Arabian Peninsula is very static with a low pressure weather system stationary over the area. The low-albedo desert interior heats up and the hot air rises, but the humidity is so low that no clouds form. Dust however does get wafted aloft giving rise to the hazy conditions often seen here.

== Flora ==
Over four hundred species of plant have been recorded in eastern Arabia. The most famous is probably Boswellia sacra, the frankincense tree, which only grows in the mountains of southern Oman, Yemen, and Somaliland. Many parts of the coast are rocky while the coastal plains of the Al Batinah Region and the Dhofar Region are edged with dunes and saline marshes. Salt-loving plants flourish and the dominant species include Zygophyllaceae, sea-lavender and white mangrove. Many of the salt-tolerant plants of Al Batinah differ from those of the south coast, and plants like Salsola drummondii, Bienertia cycloptera and Salsola rosmarinus are also found in the Irano-Turanian Region.

Sabkhas (salt flats) with hypersaline conditions are typically marked by an absence of vegetation. In some cases plant life can be accommodated on small sandy mounds in these sabkhas known as nabkhas due to their relatively lower salinity levels.

In the south of the country, the monsoon rainfall creates a wealth of vegetation that is not present in more arid regions.

== Fauna ==
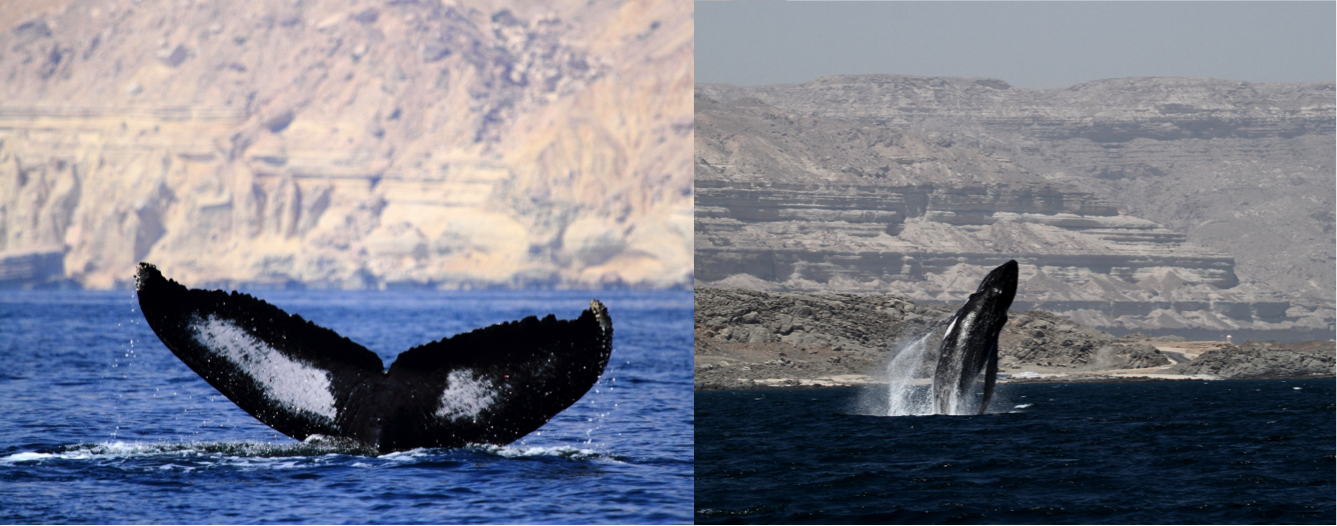
Arabian humpback whales off Dhofar

One of the last places in which the Arabian leopard survives is the Dhofar mountains in southern Oman, and the Jabal Samhan Nature Reserve has been set up to protect these critically endangered big cats. Other carnivores present in the reserve include the striped hyena, Blanford's fox and Arabian wildcat. The central section of Oman has vast stretches of gravelly desert with very little vegetation. The Arabian Oryx Sanctuary was set up here to aid in the conservation of the Arabian oryx, and it is also a refuge for the sand gazelle, the mountain gazelle, the Nubian ibex, the honey badger, the red fox, the caracal, the sand cat and the Arabian wildcat.

Over five hundred species of bird have been recorded from Oman. Some of these are resident, others arrive in spring to breed, departing by autumn. Still more are in transit, on migration routes between the Palearctic realm, Africa, and the Indian Subcontinent. The east coast with its mudflats and lagoons is visited by many species of wader, and the mangrove areas are home to the red-wattled lapwing and the collared kingfisher. The coast and offshore islands are home to gulls, terns and cormorants. The mountainous north of the country attracts many passerines in passage, the desert areas are home to the endangered houbara bustard, sand partridge, four species of sandgrouse, desert larks, pipits, wheatears and buntings. The mountains additionally attract golden eagles and Egyptian vultures. The Dhofar region in the south has a great variety of breeding and migratory species. The Omani owl (Strix butleri) is a species of owl discovered in 2013, and is believed to be the only bird endemic to Oman.

Oman has about sixty-four species of reptile; these include lizards, skinks, geckos, agamas and a single species of chameleon. Most of the approximately one dozen or so snake species in the country are harmless, but the uncommon horned viper, carpet viper, puff adder and cobra are venomous. There are just three species of amphibian, one of which is the Dhofar toad. The number of freshwater fish found in the country is limited because there are few bodies of permanent water. The Oman garra is one fish found in the northern mountains, and it also has a blind version that lives in caves.

Oman is also rich in marine diversity, especially cetaceans. There is a population of humpback whales that may be the most isolated, possibly the most endangered, and the only non-migratory population in the world. Off Muscat there are other humpback whales, pygmy blue whales, Bryde's whales, sperm whales, false killer whales, Risso's dolphins, spinner dolphins, bottlenose dolphins, Indo-Pacific humpbacked dolphins, and the occasional killer whale.

== Conservation ==
Oman is more aware than some of its neighbors of the need to conserve its wildlife. It is a signatory to a number of treaties on global issues, and a number of areas have been set aside as nature reserves. Measures have been put in place to protect the beaches where the endangered green sea turtle breed, a leopard conservation trust has been set up, and the Arabian Oryx Sanctuary was established and became a UNESCO World Heritage Site in 1994. However, the Omani government later reduced the size of the protected area by about 90% to allow for oil prospecting, and in 2007, the sanctuary became the first ever World Heritage Site to be delisted.

== See also ==
- Wildlife of Saudi Arabia
- Wildlife of the United Arab Emirates
- Wildlife of Yemen
- List of mountains in the United Arab Emirates
- List of wadis of the United Arab Emirates
- List of mountains in Oman
- List of wadis in Oman
- Jebel Hafeet, an outlier of the Western Hajar on the border of Oman and the UAE
- Masirah Island
