= Dhofar Mountains =

Mountain range in southern Oman

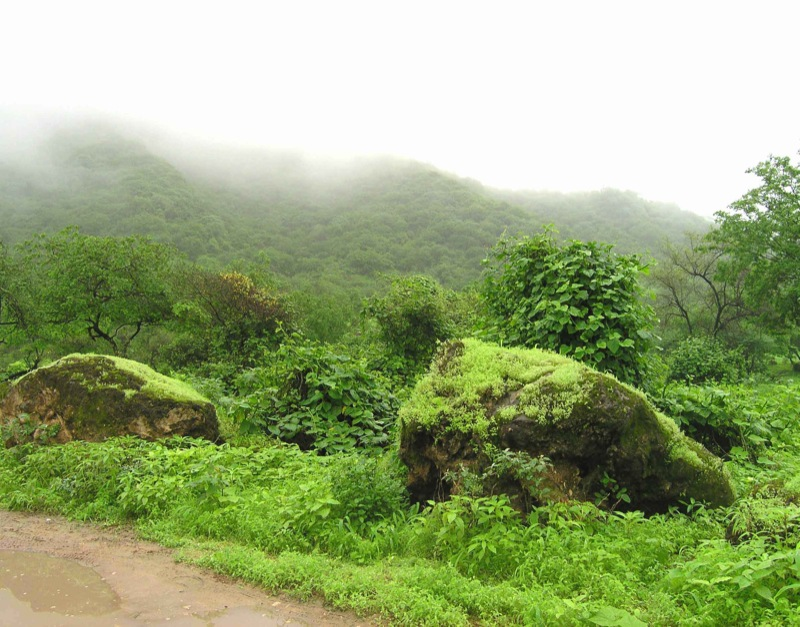
- The area of Salalah during the annual Khareef season

Highest point
- Coordinates: 17.1°N 54.0°E

Naming
- Native name: جِبَال ظُفَار (Arabic)

Geography
- Location within Oman Location within Middle East Location within West and Central Asia
- Country: Oman
- Region: Asia

The Dhofar Mountains (Arabic: جِبَال ظُفَار, romanized: Jibāl Ẓufār) are a mountain range in the southeastern part of the Arabian Peninsula. In a broad sense, they extend from Dhofar Governorate in Oman to Hadhramaut Governorate in Yemen, and are located between the Hajar in the northern part of Oman, and the Sarawat in the western part of Yemen. Otherwise, the range in the eastern part of Yemen, particularly near Mukalla, is referred to as the Hadhramaut or "Mahrat".

== Geology ==
The Dhofar Mountains consist of three subranges: Jabal al-Qarā (Arabic: جبل القرا), Jabal al-Qamar (Arabic: جبل القمر) and Jabal Samḥān (Arabic: جبل سمحان). The latter is the highest point at about 2,100 m (6,900 ft).

== Wildlife ==
The Arabian leopard thrives here, particularly in Jabal Samhan Nature Reserve.

These mountains are home to Oman's largest population of Nubian ibex.

The Asiatic cheetah used to occur in this region. Oman's last known cheetah was killed near Jibjat in 1977 (Harrison, 1983).

In December 2018, a Schokari sand racer was spotted in a mountain in this region.

== Gallery ==
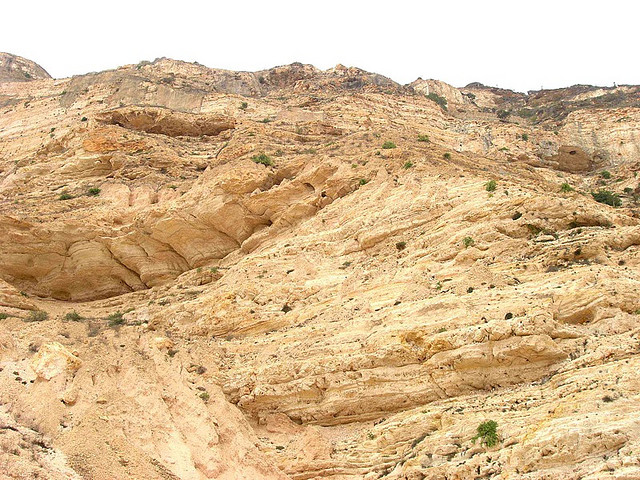
The rugged landscape outside Salalah, outside the Kharīf season

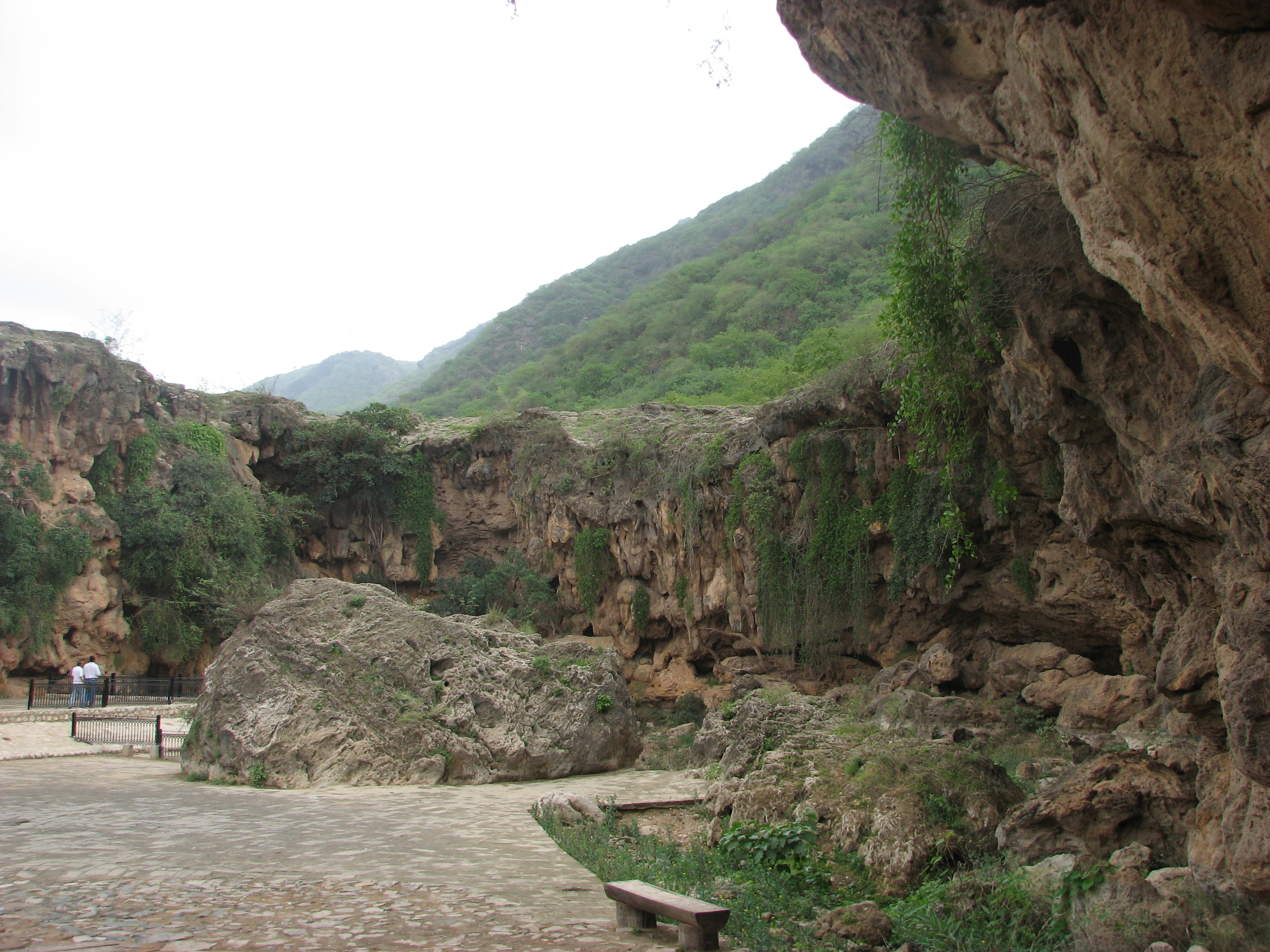
Ayn Jarziz with the greenery typical of the Kharīf (autumn)

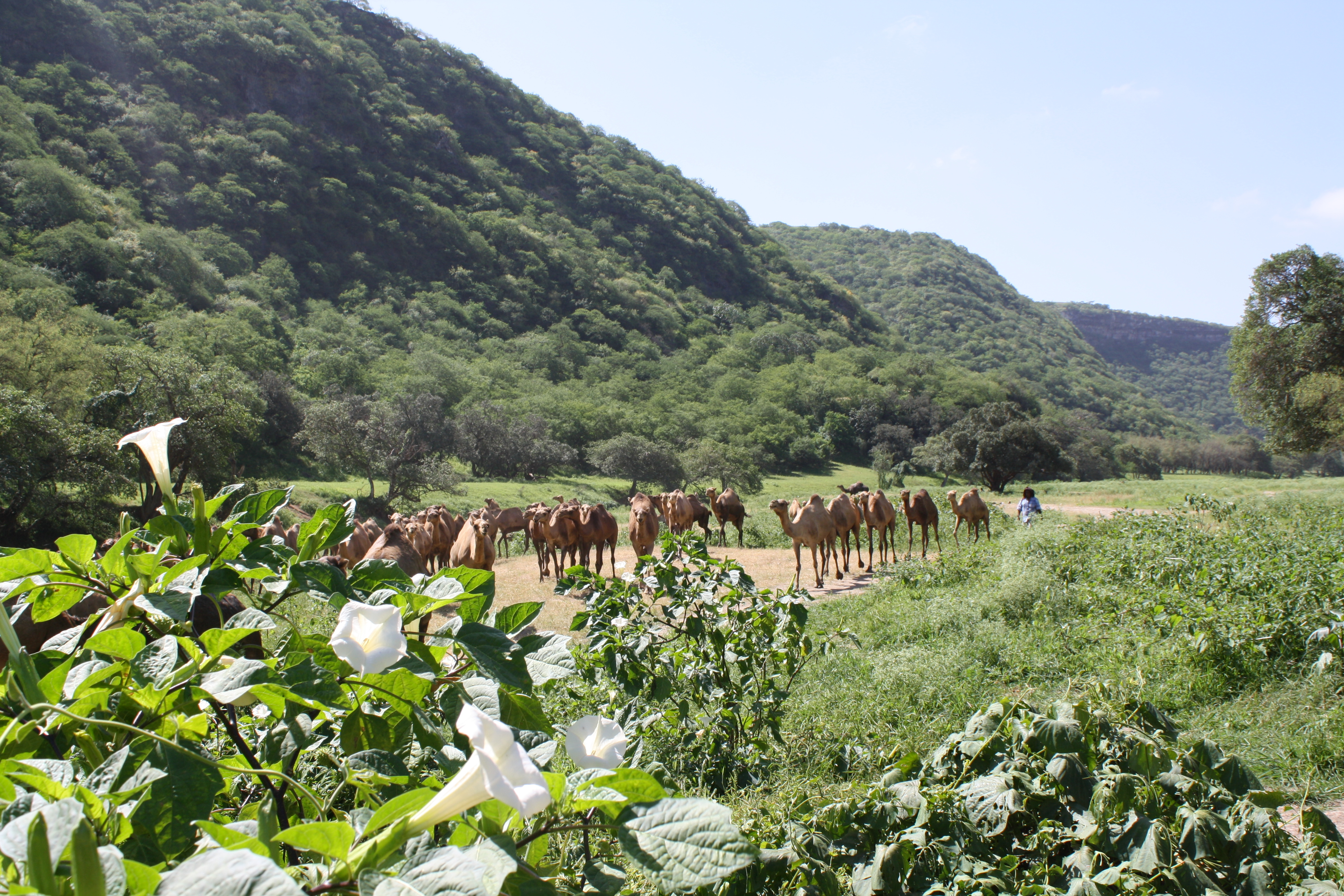
Camels in the vicinity of Salalah

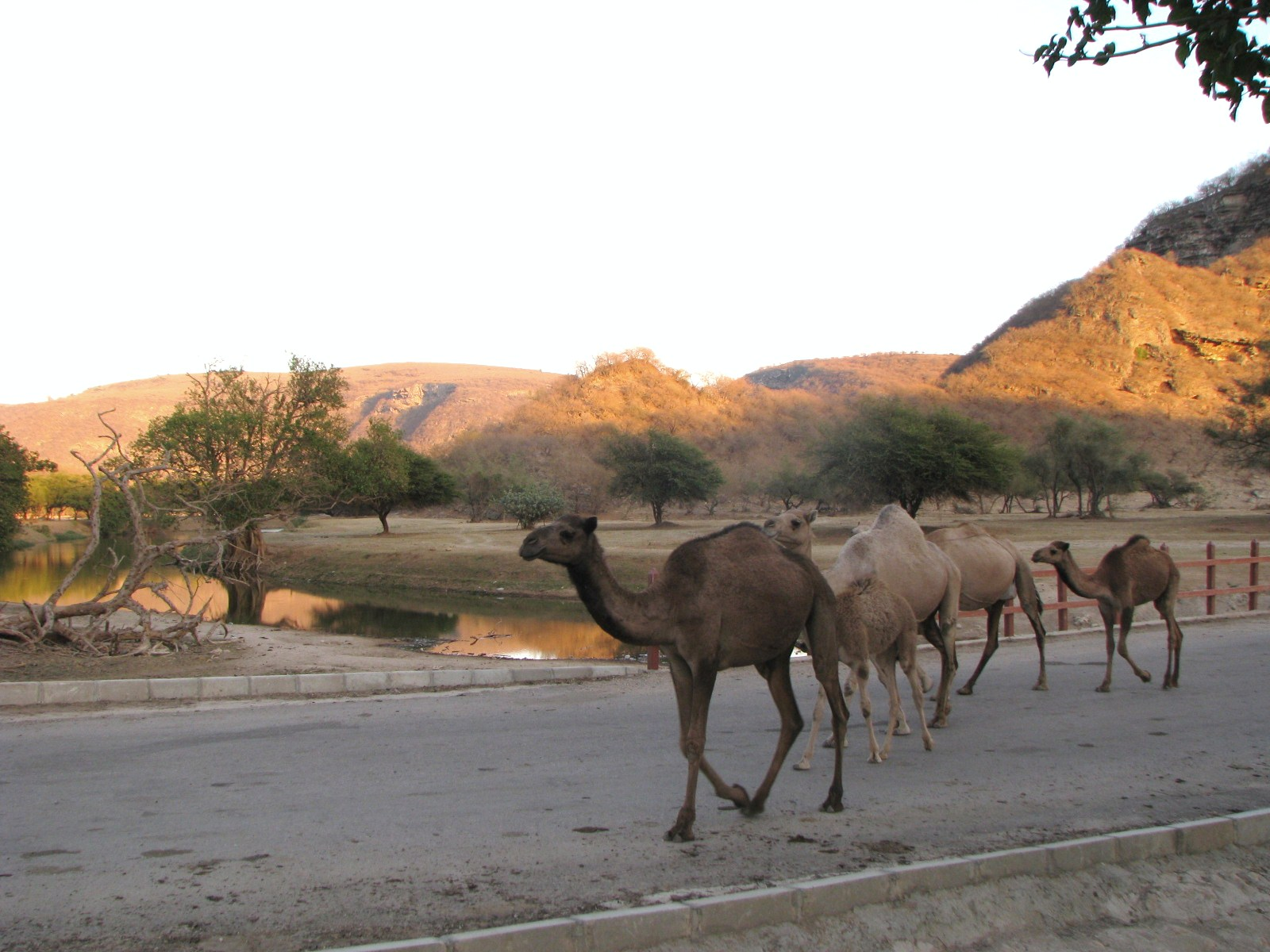
Camels walking in the rugged landscape, outside the Kharīf season

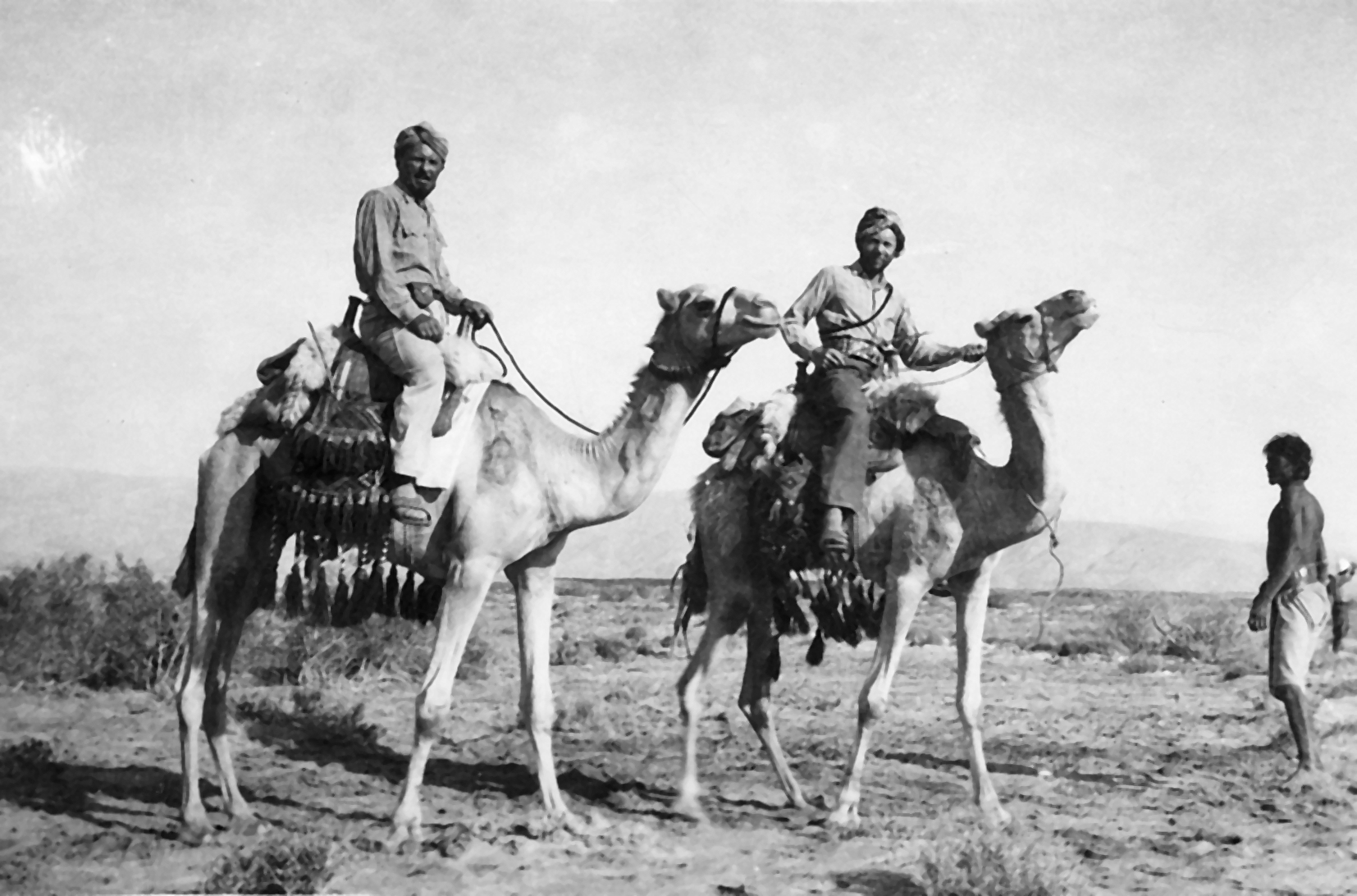
Camel ride in 1948

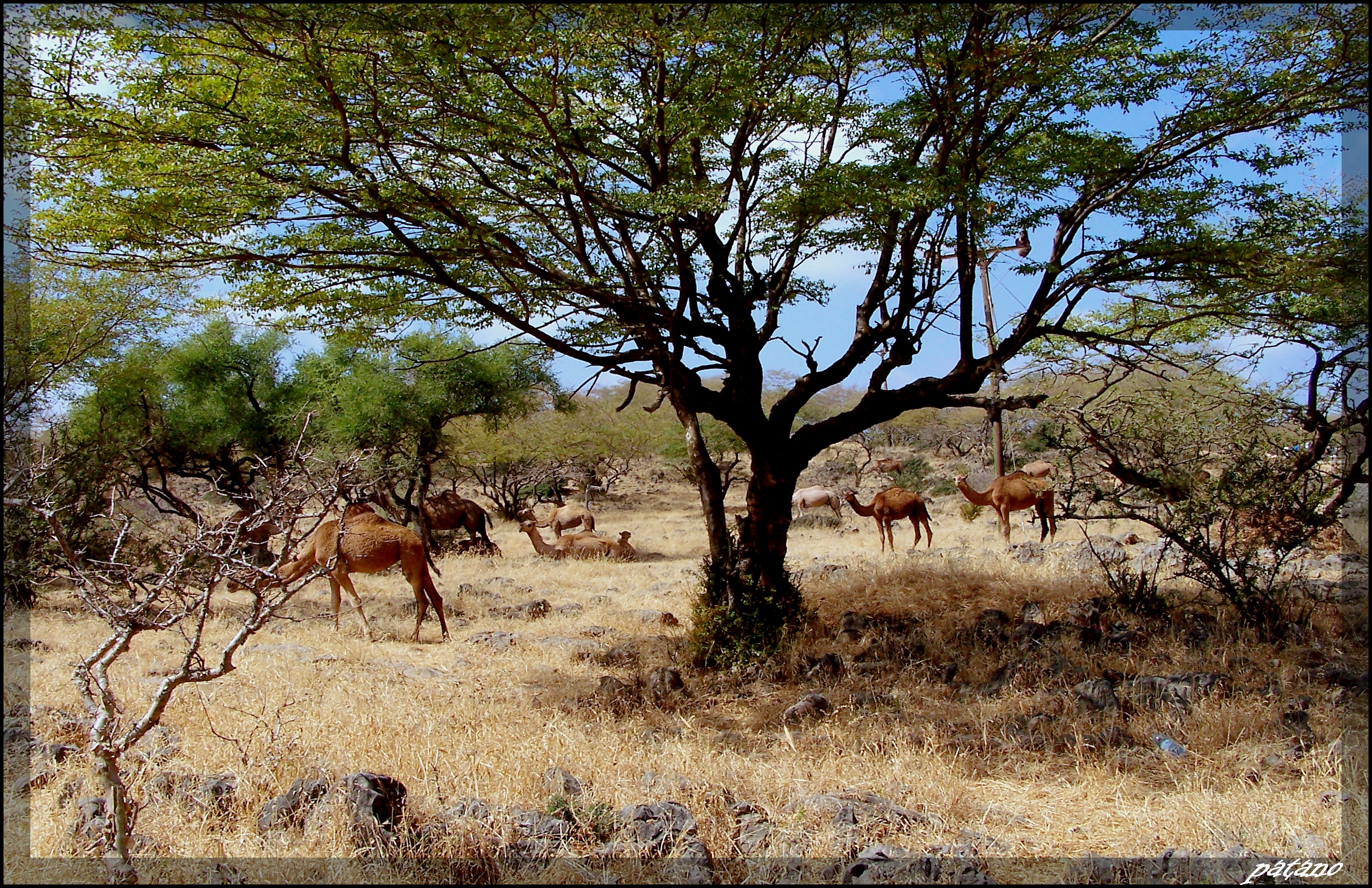
Trees and camels

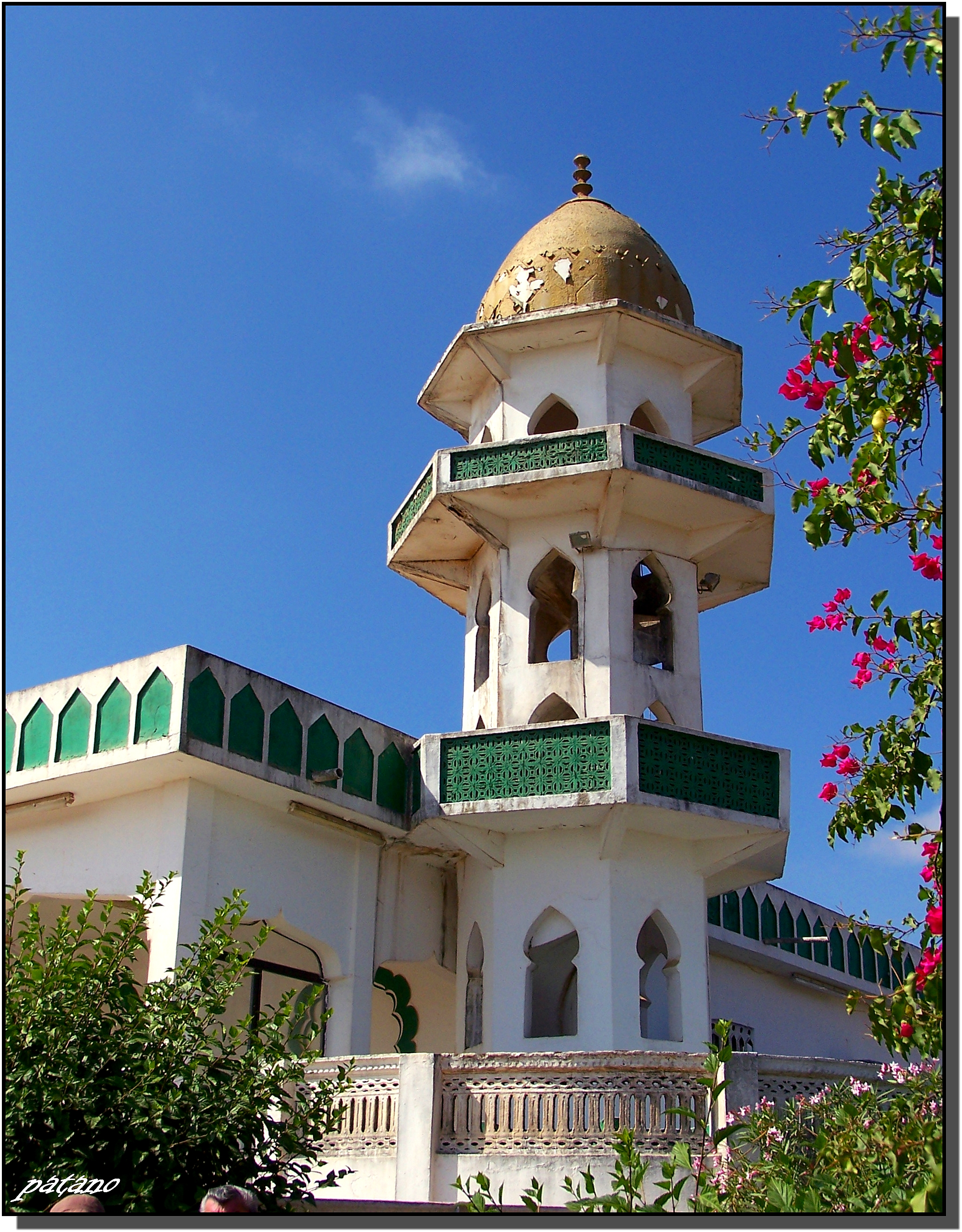
This mosque near Salalah is claimed to be the place where the remains of Ayyub (Job) are located.
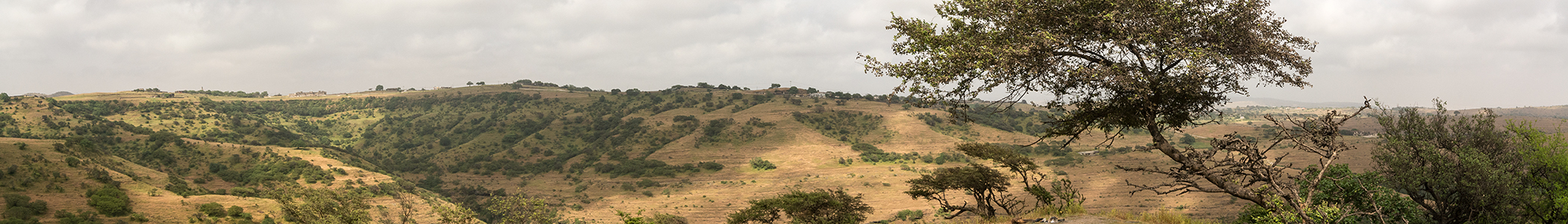
Landscape of Al-Qarah Mountains

== See also ==
- Arabian Peninsula coastal fog desert
- Geography of Oman
- Hills of Masirah Island
- South Arabia
  - South Arabian fog woodlands, shrublands, and dune
  - Southwestern Arabian foothills savanna
