= Geography of the United Arab Emirates =

Geography of United Arab Emirates
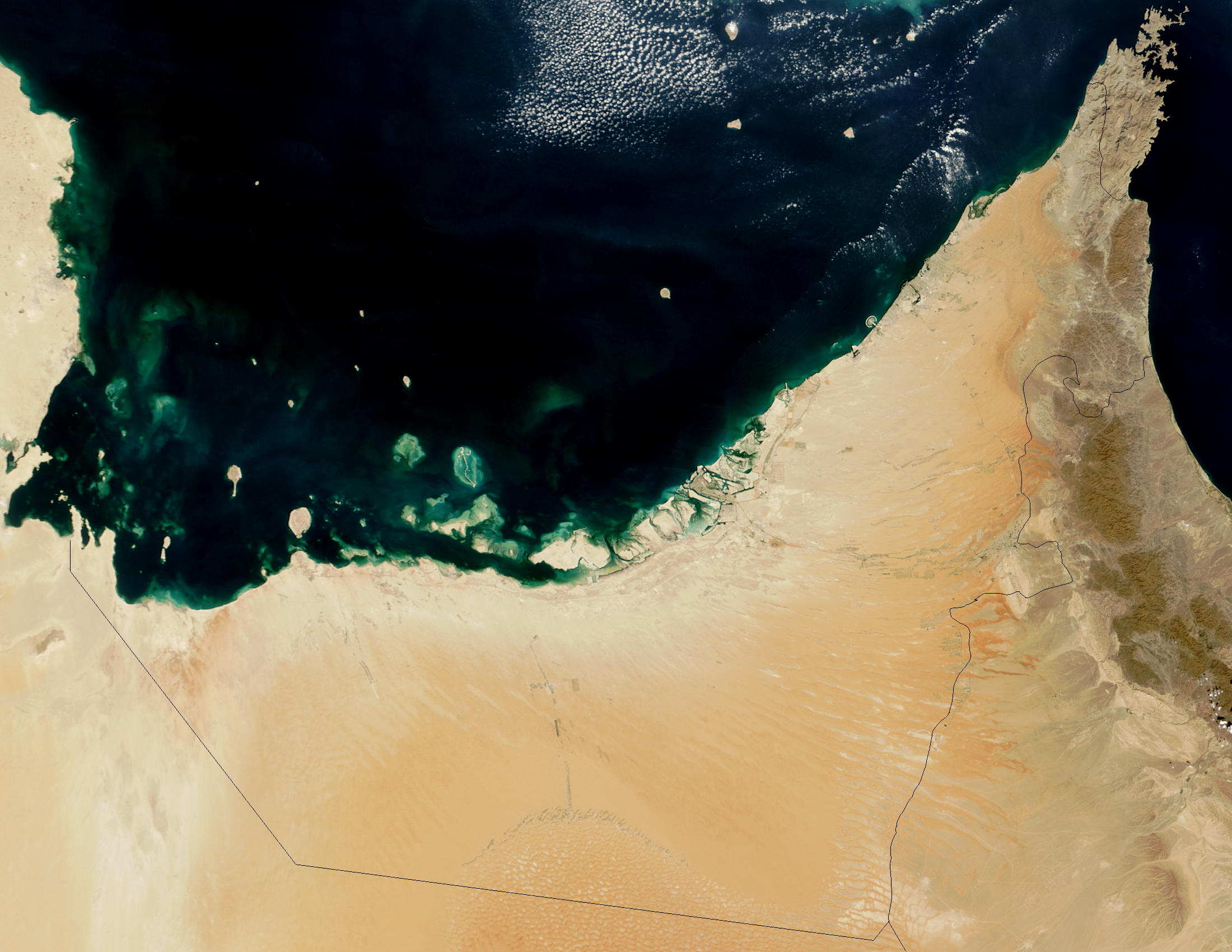
- Continent: Asia
- Region: West Asia
- Coordinates: 24°N 54°E
- Area: Ranked 114th
  - Total: 83,600 km^{2} (32,300 sq mi)
  - Land: 100%
  - Water: 0%
- Coastline: 1,318 km (819 mi)
- Borders: total: 867 km (539 mi)
- Highest point: Jebel Jais; 1,892 m (6,207 ft)
- Lowest point: Sabkhat Matti −17 m (−56 ft)
- Longest river: None
- Largest lake: Lake Zakher
- Climate: arid; mild, pleasant winters; very hot, humid summers
- Terrain: mountainous and barren desert covered with loose sand and gravel
- Natural resources: petroleum, natural gas, marine resources
- Natural hazards: haze, dust storms, sandstorms common
- Environmental issues: limited natural freshwater resources are increasing dependence on large-scale desalination facilities
- Exclusive economic zone: 58,218 km^{2} (22,478 mi^{2})

The United Arab Emirates is situated in West Asia, bordering the Gulf of Oman and the Persian Gulf, between Oman and Saudi Arabia; it is at a strategic location along the northern approaches to the Strait of Hormuz, a vital transit point for world crude oil. The UAE lies between 22°50′ and 26° north latitude and between 51° and 56°25′ east longitude. It shares a 19 km (12 mi) border with Qatar on the northwest, a 530 km (330 mi) border with Saudi Arabia on the west, south, and southeast, and a 450 km (280 mi) border with Oman on the southeast and northeast.

The land border with Qatar in the Khor Al Adaid area is a source of long-running dispute (in fact, whether it even shares a land border with Qatar is in dispute). The total area of the UAE is approximately 83,600 square kilometres (32,300 square miles). The country's exact size is unknown because of disputed claims to several islands in the Persian Gulf, because of the lack of precise information on the size of many of these islands, and because most of its land boundaries, especially with Saudi Arabia, remain undemarcated. The largest emirate, Abu Dhabi, accounts for 87 percent of the UAE's total area (72,732 km^{2} (28,082 sq mi)). The smallest emirate, Ajman, encompasses only 259 km^{2} (100 sq mi).

== Boundaries ==
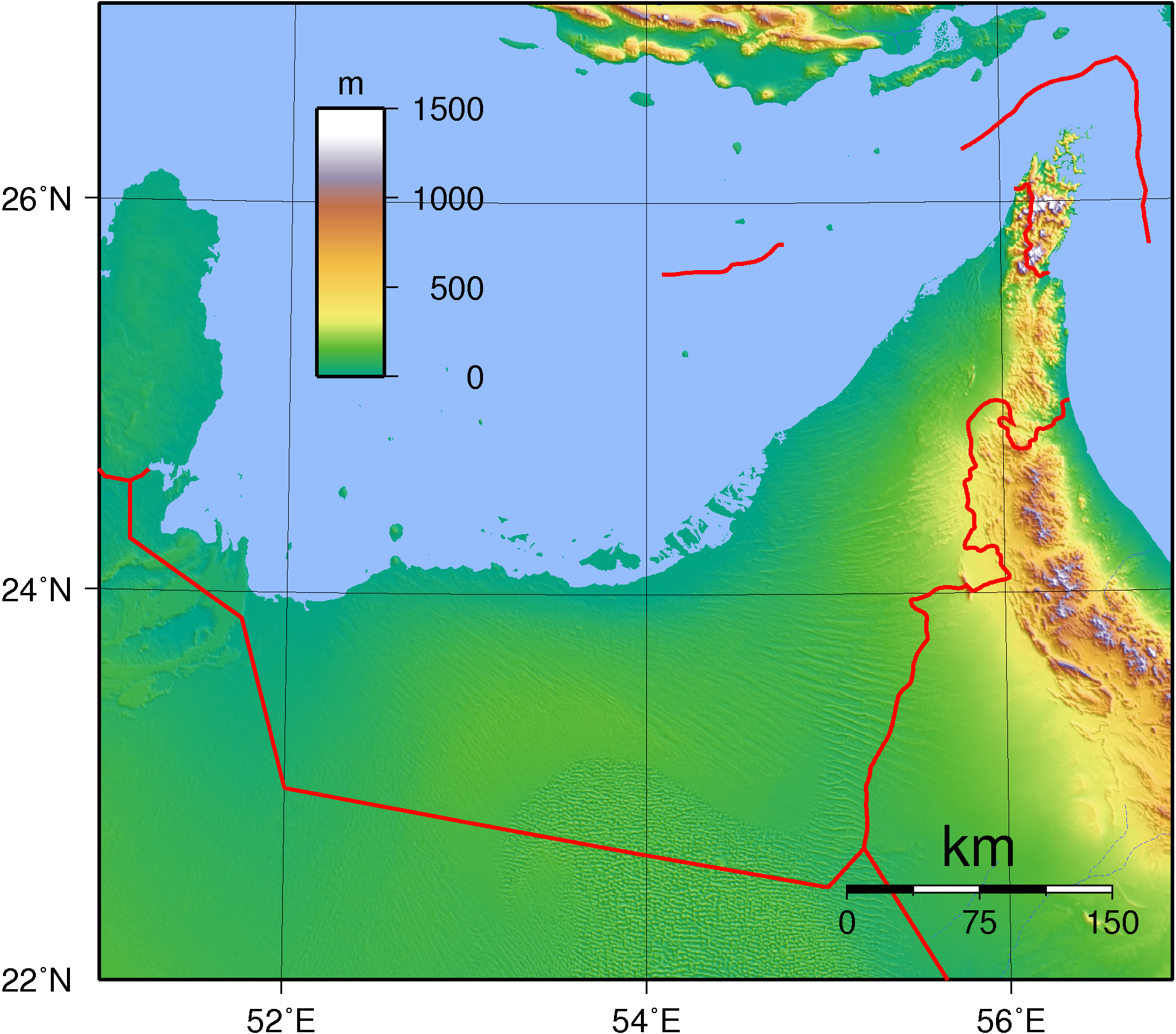
Topography of the UAE

The UAE stretches for more than 650 km (400 miles) along the southern shore of the Persian Gulf. Most of the coast consists of salt pans that extend far inland. A recent global remote sensing analysis suggested that there were 637 km^{2} of tidal flats in the United Arab Emirates, making it the 40th ranked country in terms of tidal flat extent. The largest natural harbor is at Dubai, although other ports have been dredged at Abu Dhabi, Sharjah, and elsewhere. Numerous islands are found in the Persian Gulf, and the ownership of some of them has been the subject of international disputes with both Iran and Qatar. The smaller islands, as well as many coral reefs and shifting sandbars, are a menace to navigation. Strong tides and occasional windstorms further complicate ship movements near the shore.

These northern emirates on the Persian Gulf and Gulf of Oman are part of the Gulf of Oman desert and semi-desert ecoregion.

South and west of Abu Dhabi, vast, rolling sand dunes merge into the Rub' al Khali (Empty Quarter) of Saudi Arabia. The desert area of Abu Dhabi includes two important oases with adequate underground water for permanent settlements and cultivation. The extensive Liwa Oasis is in the south near the undefined border with Saudi Arabia, and about 200 km (120 miles) to the northeast is Al Buraymi Oasis, which extends on both sides of the Abu Dhabi-Oman border.

Prior to withdrawing from the area in 1971, Britain delineated the internal borders among the seven emirates in order to pre-empt territorial disputes that might hamper formation of the federation. In general, the rulers of the emirates accepted the British intervention, but in the case of boundary disputes between Abu Dhabi and Dubai, and also between Dubai and Sharjah, conflicting claims were not resolved until after the UAE became independent. The most complicated borders were in the Western Mountains, where five of the emirates contested jurisdiction over more than a dozen enclaves.

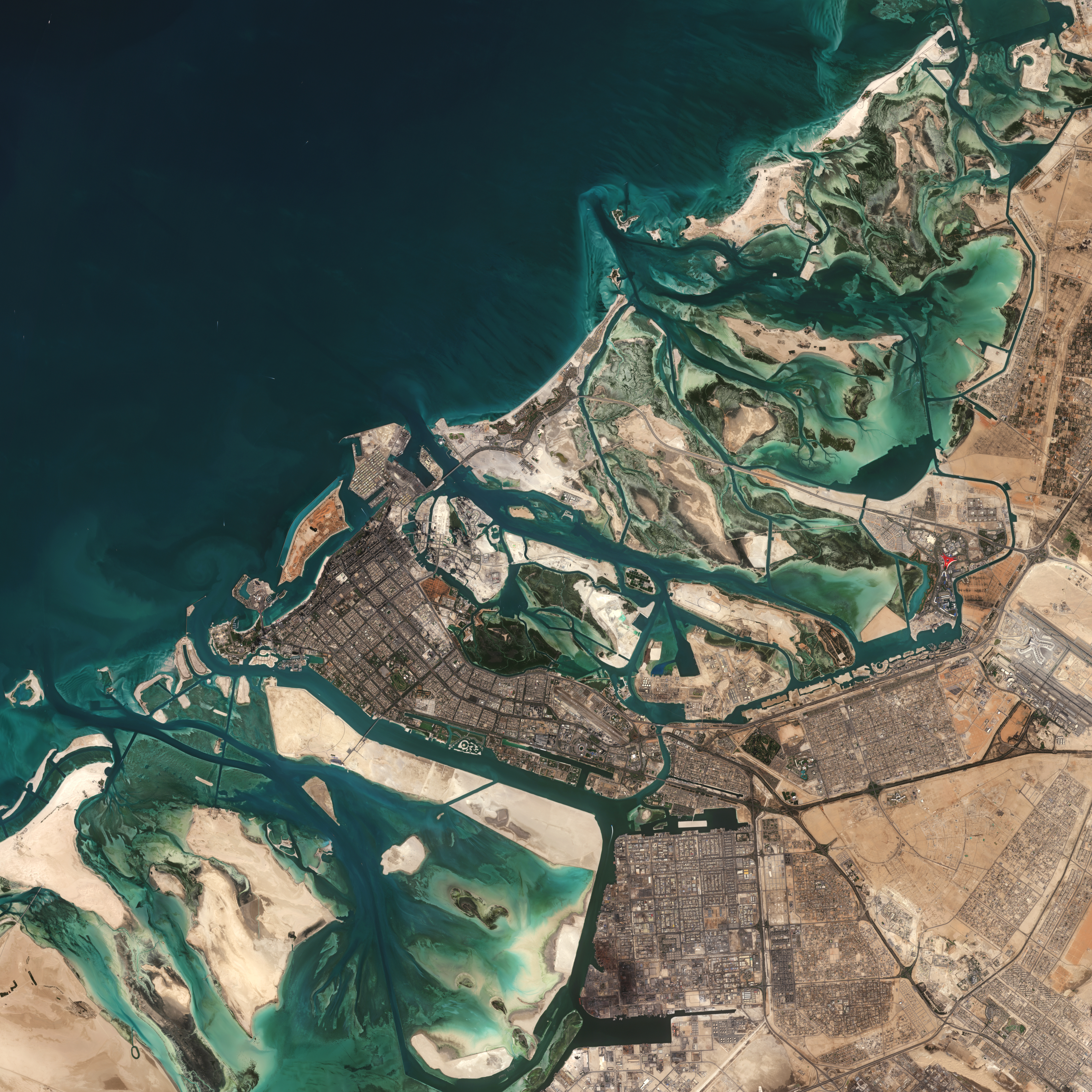
The coast of Abu Dhabi

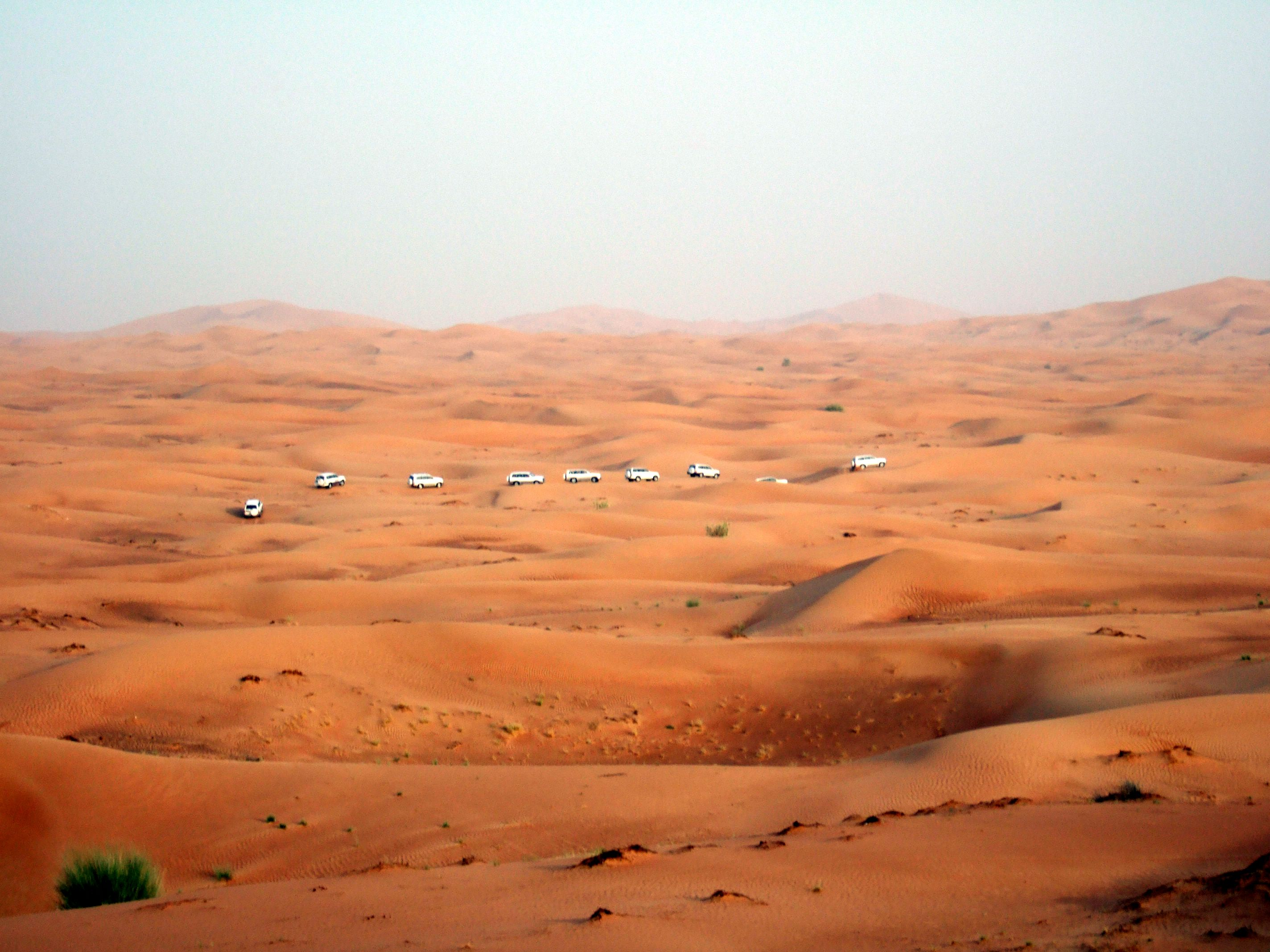
An organised dune-bashing safari in the Emirate of Dubai

=== Mountains ===
The UAE also extends for about 90 km (56 miles) along the Gulf of Oman, an area known as Al-Batinah coast. The Western Hajar Mountains (Jibāl Al-Ḥajar Al-Gharbī), rising in places to 2,500 m (8,200 ft), separate Al-Batinah coast from the rest of the UAE. Beginning at the UAE-Oman border on the Persian Gulf coast of the Ras Musandam (Musandam Peninsula), the Western Mountains extend southeastward for about 150 km (93 miles) to the southernmost UAE-Oman frontier on the Gulf of Oman. The range continues as the Eastern Hajar Mountains (Jibāl Al-Ḥajar Ash-Sharqī) for more than 500 km (310 miles) into Oman. The steep mountain slopes run directly to the shore in many places. Nevertheless, there are small harbors at Dibba Al-Hisn, Kalba, and Khor Fakkan on the Gulf of Oman. In the vicinity of Fujairah, where the mountains do not approach the coast, there are sandy beaches.

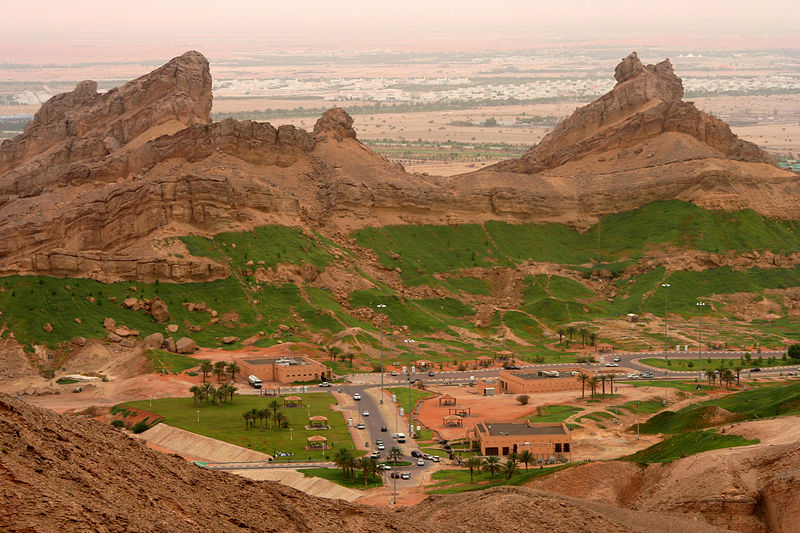
Jebel Hafeet near Al Ain in the Emirate of Abu Dhabi

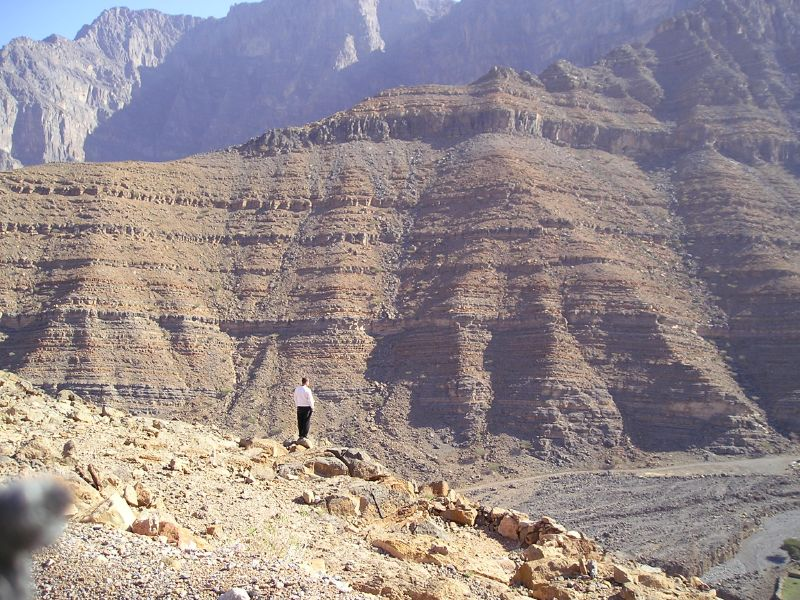
The mountainous region of Al-Hajar Mountains near Hatta in northern UAE

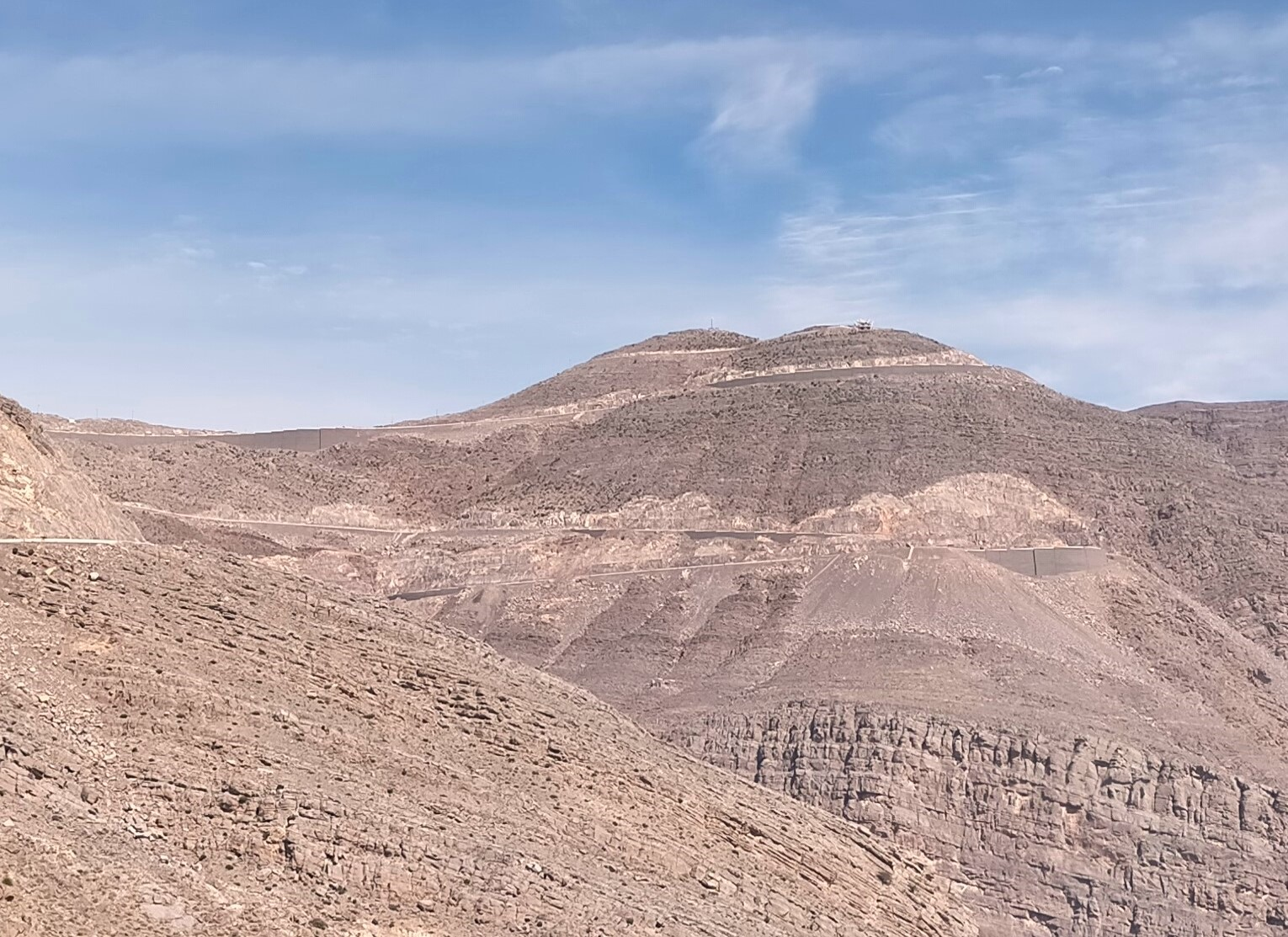
Jabal ar Rahrah (1,691 m), Emirate of Ras Al Khaimah

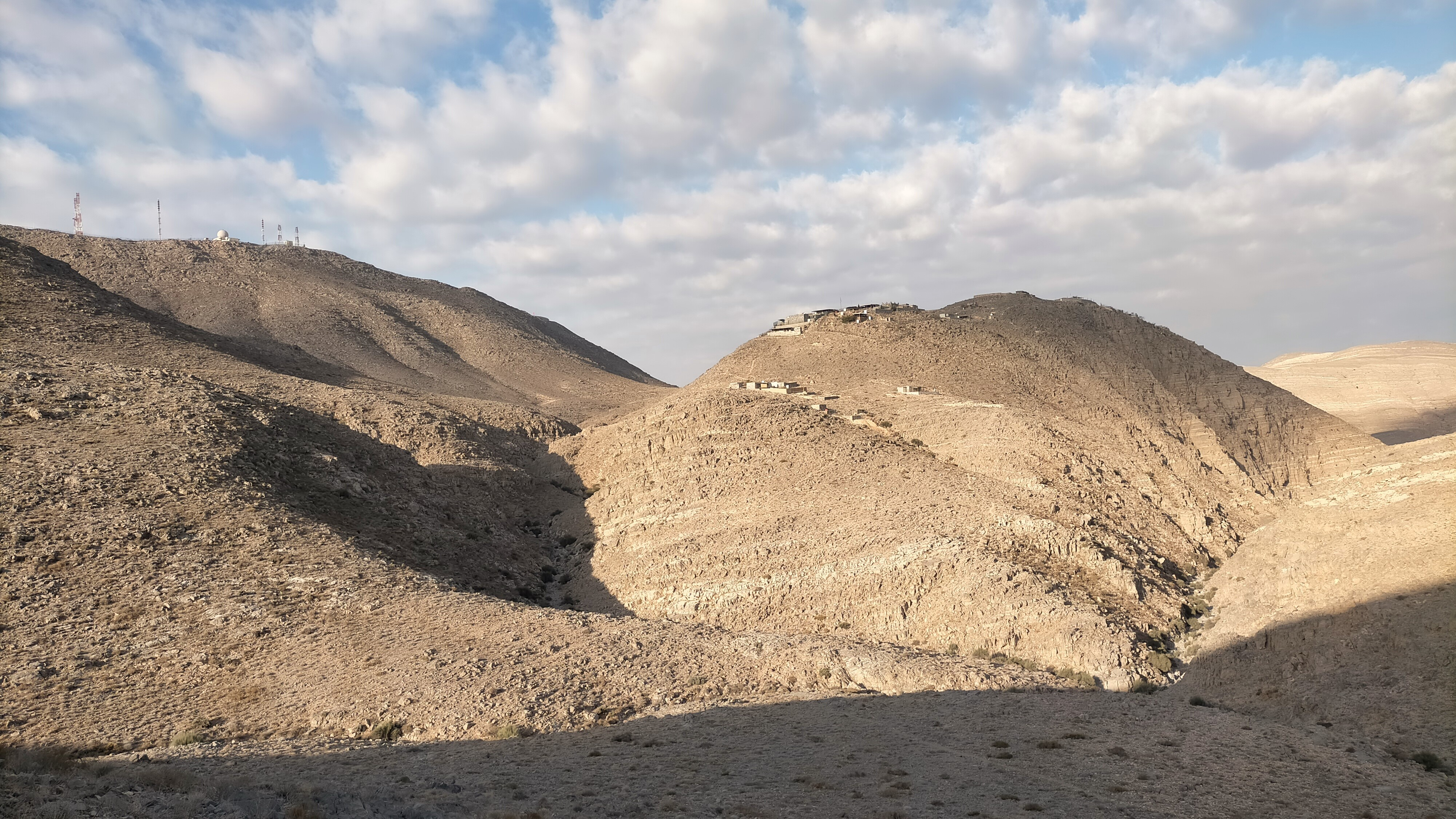
Jabal Yibir (1,527 m), Emirate of Fujairah

== Climate ==
United Arab Emirates is the second most water stressed country in the world.

The climate of the UAE generally is very hot and sunny. The hottest months are July and August, when average maximum temperatures reach above 48 °C (118.4 °F) on the coastal plain. In the Western Hajar Mountains, temperatures are considerably cooler, a result of increased altitude. Average minimum temperatures in January and February are between 10 and 14 °C (50.0 and 57.2 °F). During the late summer months, a humid southeastern wind known as the sharqi makes the coastal region especially unpleasant. The average annual rainfall in the coastal area is less than 120 mm (4.7 in), but in some mountainous areas annual rainfall often reaches 350 mm (13.8 in). Rain in the coastal region falls in short, torrential bursts during the summer months, sometimes resulting in floods in ordinarily dry wadi beds. The region is prone to occasional, violent dust storms, which can severely reduce visibility. The Jebel Jais mountain cluster in Ras Al Khaimah has experienced snow only four times (2004, 2009, 2017 and 2020) since records began.

Climate data for Dubai (1977–2015 normals)
Month	Jan	Feb	Mar	Apr	May	Jun	Jul	Aug	Sep	Oct	Nov	Dec	Year
Record high °C (°F)	31.8 (89.2)	37.5 (99.5)	41.3 (106.3)	43.5 (110.3)	47.0 (116.6)	47.9 (118.2)	48.5 (119.3)	48.8 (119.8)	45.1 (113.2)	42.4 (108.3)	38.0 (100.4)	33.2 (91.8)	48.8 (119.8)
Mean daily maximum °C (°F)	23.9 (75.0)	25.4 (77.7)	28.9 (84.0)	33.3 (91.9)	37.7 (99.9)	39.8 (103.6)	40.9 (105.6)	41.3 (106.3)	38.9 (102.0)	35.4 (95.7)	30.6 (87.1)	26.2 (79.2)	33.5 (92.3)
Daily mean °C (°F)	19.1 (66.4)	20.5 (68.9)	23.6 (74.5)	27.5 (81.5)	31.4 (88.5)	33.4 (92.1)	35.5 (95.9)	35.9 (96.6)	33.3 (91.9)	29.8 (85.6)	25.4 (77.7)	21.2 (70.2)	28.1 (82.5)
Mean daily minimum °C (°F)	14.3 (57.7)	15.5 (59.9)	18.3 (64.9)	21.7 (71.1)	25.1 (77.2)	27.3 (81.1)	30.0 (86.0)	30.4 (86.7)	27.7 (81.9)	24.1 (75.4)	20.1 (68.2)	16.3 (61.3)	22.6 (72.6)
Record low °C (°F)	7.7 (45.9)	7.4 (45.3)	11.0 (51.8)	13.7 (56.7)	15.7 (60.3)	21.3 (70.3)	24.1 (75.4)	24.0 (75.2)	22.0 (71.6)	15.0 (59.0)	10.8 (51.4)	8.2 (46.8)	7.4 (45.3)
Average precipitation mm (inches)	18.8 (0.74)	25.0 (0.98)	22.1 (0.87)	7.2 (0.28)	0.4 (0.02)	0.0 (0.0)	0.8 (0.03)	0.0 (0.0)	0.0 (0.0)	1.1 (0.04)	2.7 (0.11)	16.2 (0.64)	94.3 (3.71)
Average precipitation days	5.5	4.7	5.8	2.6	0.3	0.0	0.5	0.5	0.1	0.2	1.3	3.8	25.3
Mean monthly sunshine hours	251	241	270	306	350	345	332	326	309	307	279	254	3,570
Mean daily sunshine hours	8.1	8.6	8.7	10.2	11.3	11.5	10.7	10.5	10.3	9.9	9.3	8.2	9.8
Source 1: Dubai Meteorological Office
Source 2: UAE National Center of Meteorology

Climate data for Abu Dhabi
Month	Jan	Feb	Mar	Apr	May	Jun	Jul	Aug	Sep	Oct	Nov	Dec	Year
Record high °C (°F)	33.7 (92.7)	38.1 (100.6)	43.0 (109.4)	44.7 (112.5)	46.9 (116.4)	48.8 (119.8)	52.7 (126.9)	49.2 (120.6)	47.7 (117.9)	43.0 (109.4)	38.0 (100.4)	33.4 (92.1)	52.7 (126.9)
Mean daily maximum °C (°F)	24.1 (75.4)	26.0 (78.8)	29.5 (85.1)	34.5 (94.1)	39.3 (102.7)	40.8 (105.4)	42.1 (107.8)	42.7 (108.9)	40.4 (104.7)	36.5 (97.7)	31.1 (88.0)	26.3 (79.3)	34.4 (94.0)
Daily mean °C (°F)	18.8 (65.8)	19.6 (67.3)	22.6 (72.7)	26.4 (79.5)	31.2 (88.2)	33.0 (91.4)	34.9 (94.8)	35.3 (95.5)	32.7 (90.9)	29.1 (84.4)	24.5 (76.1)	20.8 (69.4)	27.4 (81.3)
Mean daily minimum °C (°F)	13.2 (55.8)	14.6 (58.3)	17.5 (63.5)	20.8 (69.4)	23.8 (74.8)	26.1 (79.0)	28.8 (83.8)	29.5 (85.1)	26.6 (79.9)	23.2 (73.8)	18.7 (65.7)	15.8 (60.4)	21.5 (70.8)
Record low °C (°F)	8.0 (46.4)	5.0 (41.0)	8.4 (47.1)	11.2 (52.2)	16.0 (60.8)	19.8 (67.6)	22.2 (72.0)	23.8 (74.8)	19.0 (66.2)	12.0 (53.6)	10.5 (50.9)	7.1 (44.8)	5.0 (41.0)
Average precipitation mm (inches)	7.0 (0.28)	21.2 (0.83)	14.5 (0.57)	6.1 (0.24)	1.3 (0.05)	0 (0)	0 (0)	1.5 (0.06)	0 (0)	0 (0)	0.3 (0.01)	5.2 (0.20)	57.1 (2.24)
Average precipitation days (≥ 0.2 mm)	1.2	2.8	2.8	1.2	0.1	0.0	0.0	0.1	0.0	0.0	0.2	1.5	9.9
Average relative humidity (%)	68	67	63	58	55	60	61	63	64	65	65	68	63
Average dew point °C (°F)	12 (54)	12 (54)	12 (54)	14 (57)	16 (61)	20 (68)	22 (72)	21 (70)	22 (72)	19 (66)	16 (61)	13 (55)	17 (62)
Mean monthly sunshine hours	246.1	232.6	251.1	280.5	342.2	336.9	314.2	307.5	302.4	304.7	286.6	257.6	3,462.4
Source 1: NOAA (1971–1991)
Source 2: Climate Yearly Report (2003-2020) Source 3: Time and Date (dewpoints, between 2005-2015)

== Flora and fauna ==
Date palms, as well as acacia and eucalyptus trees, are commonly found growing at the region's oases. Within the desert itself, the flora is much more sparse and primarily consists of grasses and thornbushes.

The region's indigenous fauna had previously come close to extinction due to intensive hunting, which led to a 1970s conservation program on the Bani Yas island by Sheikh Zayed bin Sultan Al Nahyan; this resulted in the survival of Arabian oryxes and leopards, among others. The region's coastal fish consist mainly of mackerel, perch and tuna, as well as sharks and whales.

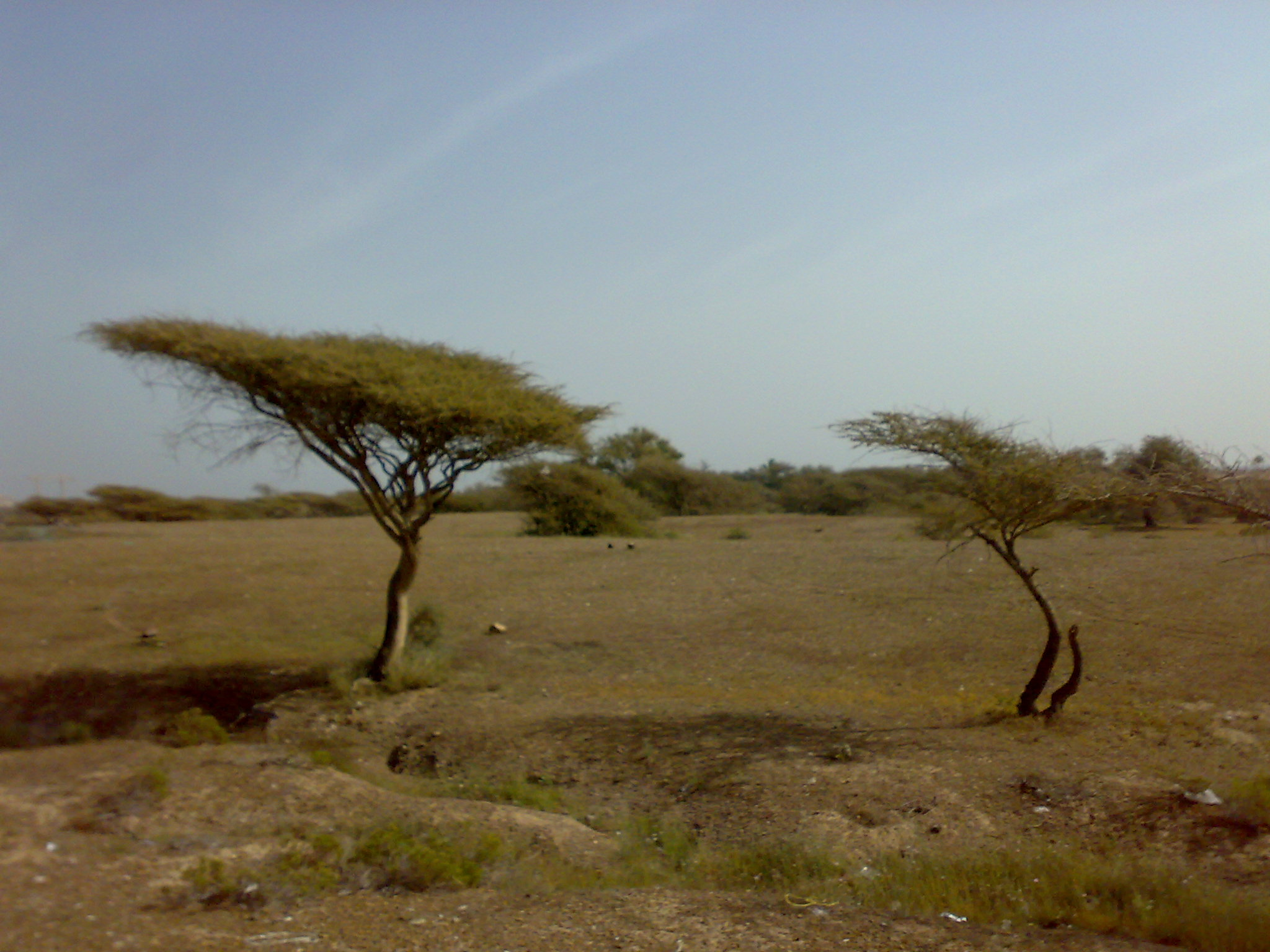
Acacia tortilis in Sharm-Dabna, Fujairah Emirate

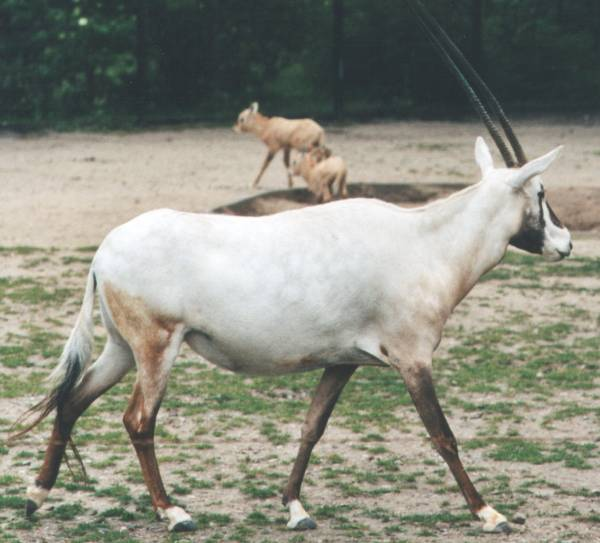
Arabian oryx

== Area and land boundaries ==
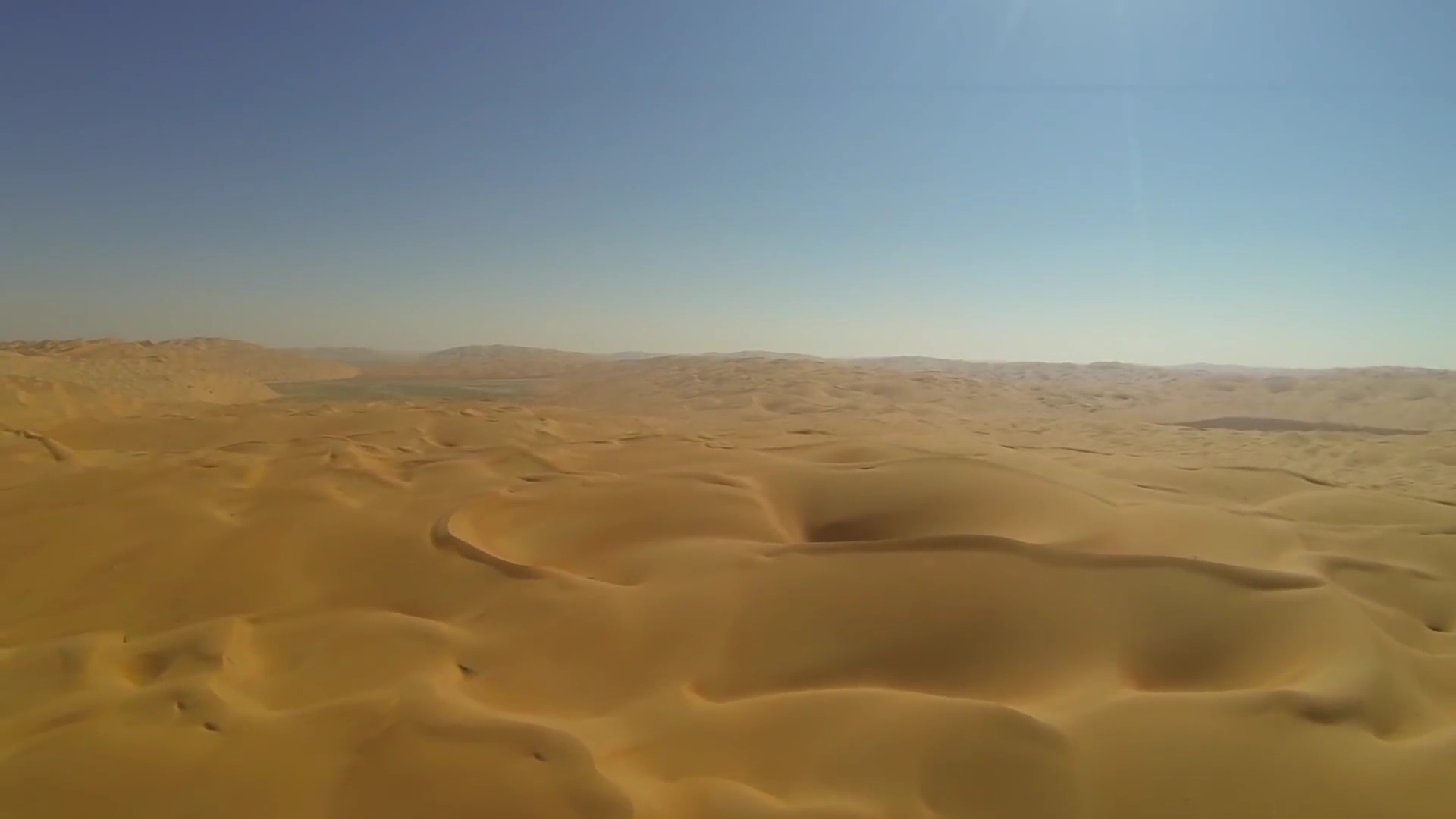
Sand dunes on the outskirts of Liwa Oasis in the western region of the Emirate of Abu Dhabi

Area:

- Total: 83,600 km^{2} (32,300 sq mi)
- Land: 83,600 km^{2} (32,300 sq mi)
- Water: 0 km^{2}

Land boundaries:

- Total: 1,066 km (662 miles)
- Border countries: Oman 609 km (378 miles); Saudi Arabia 457 km (284 miles)

Coastline: 1,318 km (819 miles)

Maritime claims:

- Contiguous zone: 24 nmi (27.6 mi; 44.4 km)
- Continental shelf: 200 nmi (230.2 mi; 370.4 km) or to the edge of the continental margin
- Exclusive economic zone: 200 nmi (230.2 mi; 370.4 km)
- Territorial sea: 12 nmi (13.8 mi; 22.2 km)

Elevation extremes:

- Lowest point: Persian Gulf 0 m
- Highest point: Jebel Jais 1,934 m (6,345 ft) (Note: Jebel Jais is the highest mountain in the UAE with a height of 1,934 m (6,345 ft), but because its peak is in Oman, Jebel Yibir or Mebrah has the highest peak)

== Resources and land use ==
- Natural resources: petroleum, natural gas
- Land use:
  - Arable land: 0.5%
  - Permanent crops: 0.5%
  - Permanent pasture: 3.6%
  - Forest: 4.5%
  - Other: 91.6% (2018)
  - Irrigated land: 923 km^{2} (356 sq mi) (2012)
- Total renewable water resources: 150,000,000 cubic metres (5.3×10^{9} cu ft)

== Environmental concerns ==
- Natural hazards: frequent sand and dust storms
- Environment - current issues: air pollution; rapid population growth and high energy demand contribute to water scarcity; lack of natural freshwater resources being overcome by desalination plants; desertification; beach pollution from oil spills
- Environment - international agreements: party to:
  - Biodiversity, Climate Change, Kyoto Protocol, Paris Agreement, Comprehensive Nuclear Test Ban, Desertification, Endangered Species, Hazardous Wastes, Marine Dumping, Ozone Layer Protection, Ship Pollution, Wetlands
  - Signed, but not ratified: Law of the Sea

== See also ==
- List of United Arab Emirates-related topics
  - Geography of Dubai
