= Jabal Samhan Nature Reserve =

Nature reserve in the area of Jabal Samḥān in Dhofar, Oman

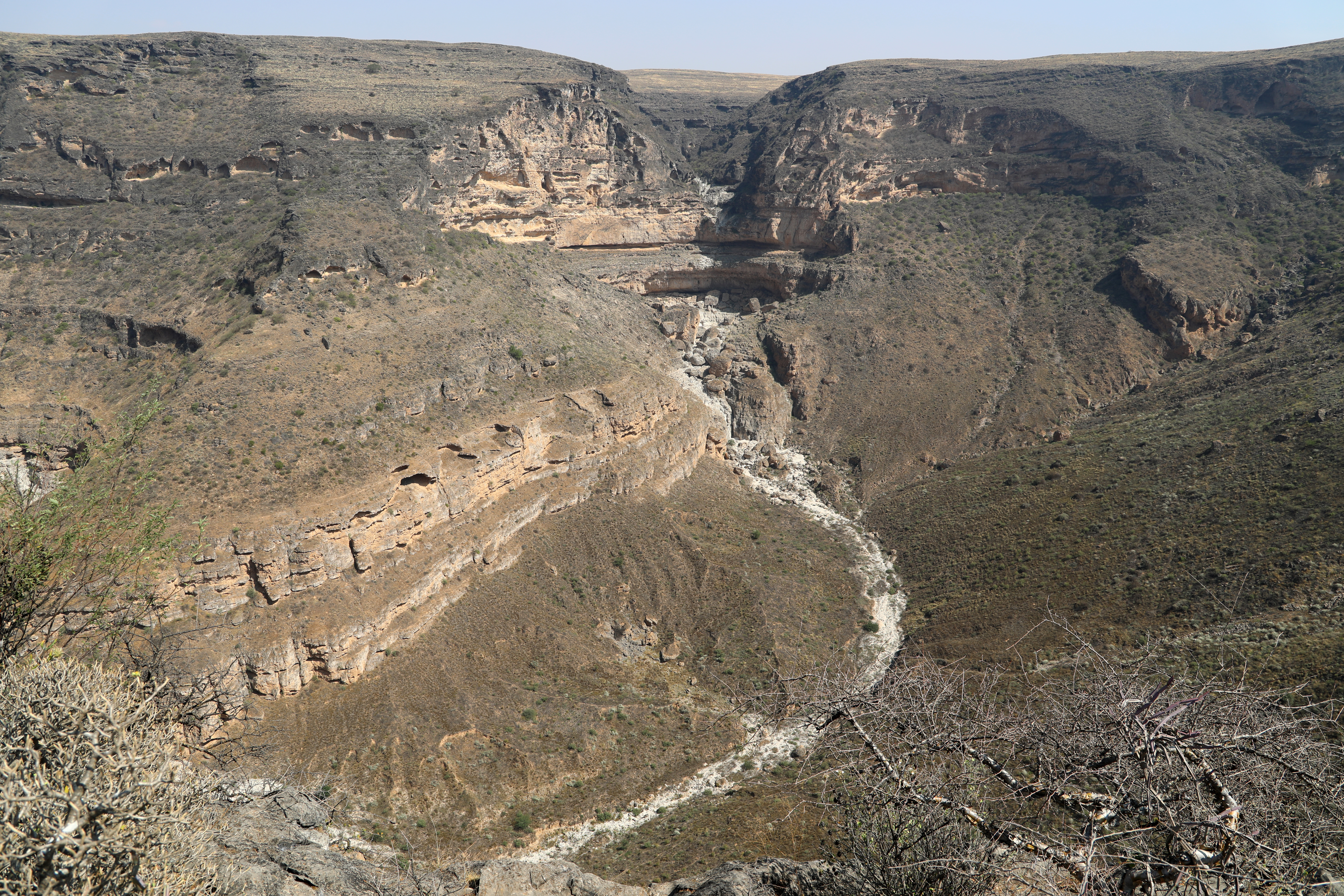

- Location within Oman Location within Middle East Location within Asia
- Location: Dhofar Governorate, South Arabia
- Nearest city: Salalah
- Coordinates: 17.516°N 54.94°E
- Area: 4,500 km^{2} (1,700 sq mi)

Jabal Samhan Nature Reserve (Arabic: محمية جبل سمحان) is a nature reserve in the area of Jabal Samḥān (Arabic: جَبَل سَمْحَان, "Mount Samhan") in Dhofar, Oman. It has an area of 4,500 square kilometres (1,700 sq mi) and has no permanent population. Being in the region of the Dhofar Mountains, it is one of the last refuges for wild Arabian leopards.

Data suggests that around twenty Arabian leopards are left in the reserve.

== Fauna ==
The most important leopard prey species are Arabian gazelle, Nubian ibex, Cape hare, rock hyrax, Indian crested porcupine, desert hedgehog and several bird species. Occasionally leopards might prey on domestic livestock. Other predators, which are found in the reserve, include caracal, striped hyena and Arabian wolf.

== See also ==
- Wildlife of Oman
