= Wildlife of the United Arab Emirates =

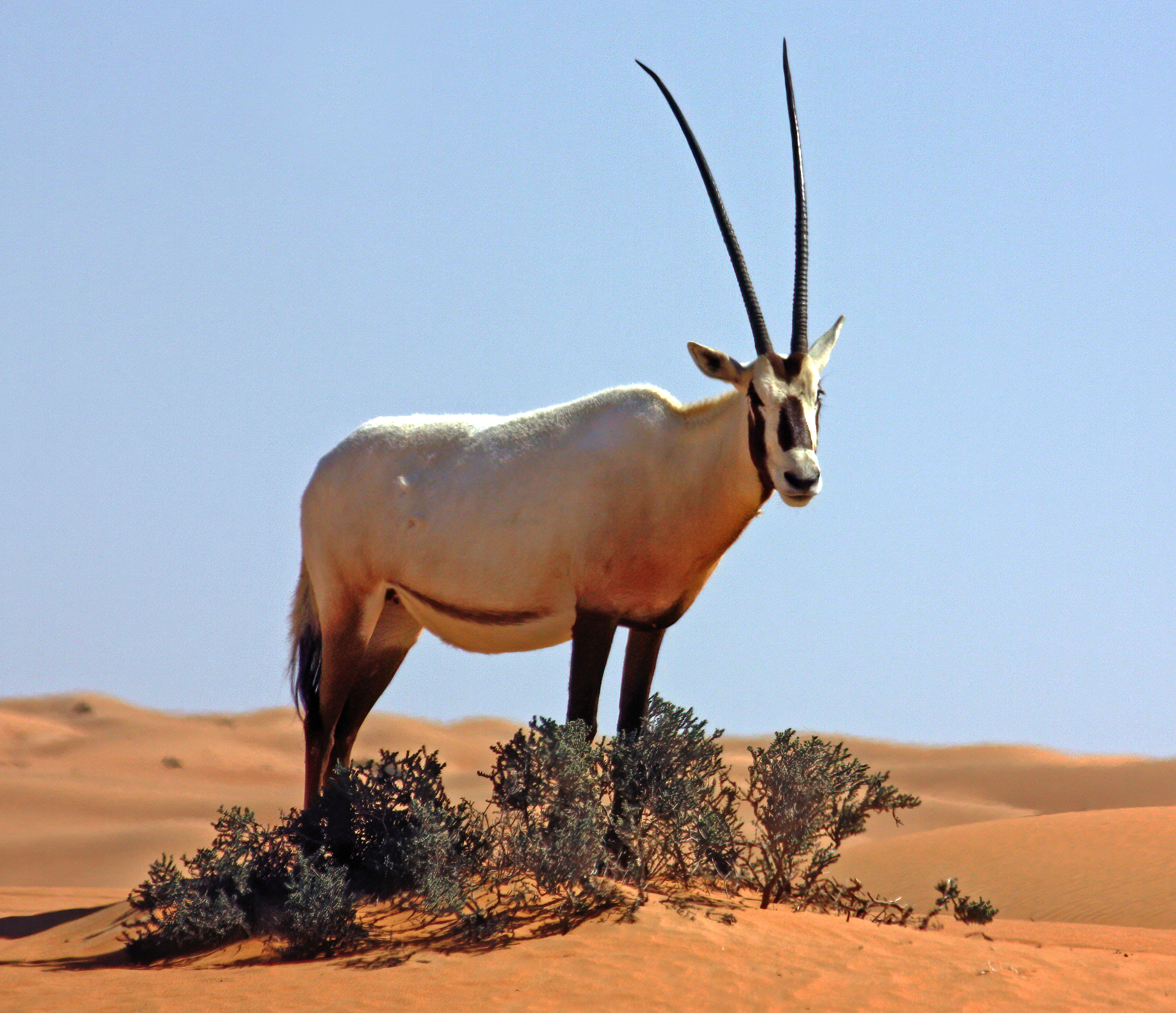
An Arabian oryx in Dubai Desert Conservation Reserve

The wildlife of the United Arab Emirates is the flora and fauna of the country on the eastern side of the Arabian Peninsula and the southern end of the Persian Gulf. The country offers a variety of habitats for wildlife including the coast, offshore islands, mangrove areas, mudflats, salt pans, sand and gravel plains, sand dunes, mountain slopes, wadis and rocky summits. Because the terrain is so varied, it supports a greater number of species of plants and animals than might be expected in a small country.

== Geography ==
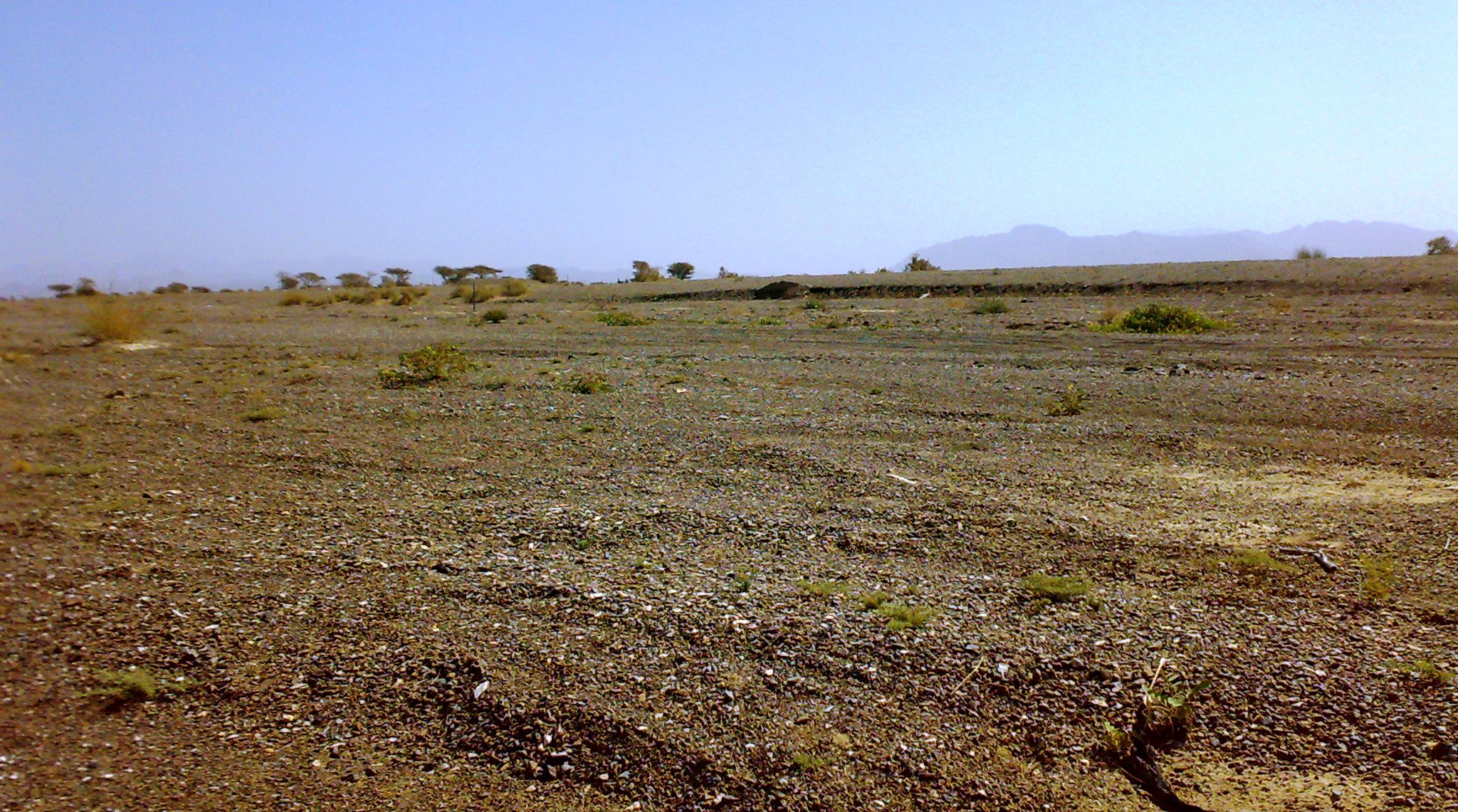
Stony desert landscape near Hatta, in the region of the Western Hajar Mountains

The United Arab Emirates occupy a corner of Arabia bounded by Saudi Arabia to the west and south, Oman to the east, the Gulf of Oman and Oman to the northeast and the Persian Gulf to the north. The northern coast stretches for about 650 km (400 mi) along the southern shore of the Persian Gulf and largely consists of salt pans that extend inland. There are numerous offshore islands, the ownership of some of which is disputed with neighbouring states. To the south is the Rub' al Khali desert, an enormous expanse of billowing sand dunes. Two large oases in the east are the Liwa Oasis, near the undefined border with Saudi Arabia, and Al-Buraimi Oasis, which includes Al Ain on the UAE side of the border with Oman. To the east, the land rises and becomes mountainous, this being the northwestern end of Al-Hajar Mountains, of which Jebel Hafeet near Al-Ain may be considered an outlier, and which include the Ru'us al-Jibal (literally "Heads of the Mountains") in the Musandam Peninsula. Beyond these, the coast on the Gulf of Oman is rugged.

In the southeast of the country, near the border with Oman, there is a man-made lake, Lake Zakher, formed as a result of the release of waste water from the desalination plants on which the UAE relies for its freshwater supplies. The lake has formed as the groundwater rose, and many birds now visit the lake.

== Flora ==
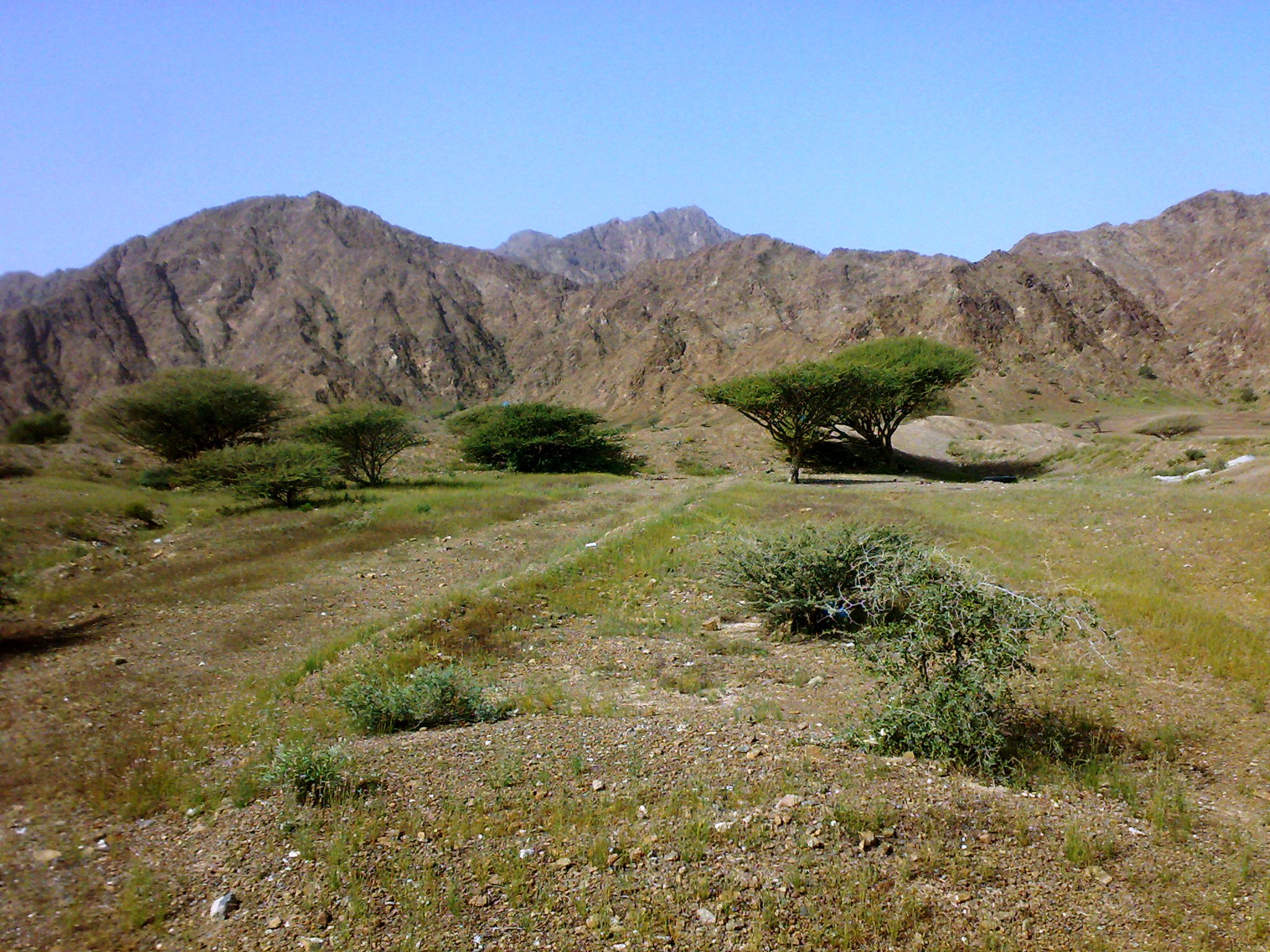
Vachellia tortilis in a mountainous landscape in Fujairah

A wide range of plants is associated with the many types of habitat in the United Arab Emirates. One of these types is the sabkha, an area in which salty water has flooded the land and evaporated, leaving crusty salt pans. These occur on the western part of the Gulf Coast but also among dunes inland. The plants found on their edges are salt-tolerant members of Salicornioideae and Zygophyllum.

At inland sites Zygophyllum qatarense predominates along with grasses such as Aeluropus lagopoides and Panicum turgidum. Sandy plains further east along the coast from the sabkha region have occasional dwarf tamarisk trees and such plants as Caroxylon imbricatum and Zygophyllum mandavillei, and in coastal lagoons, and in creeks further east, the white mangrove is plentiful. Mangroves are also found in a national park to the east of the island of Abu Dhabi.

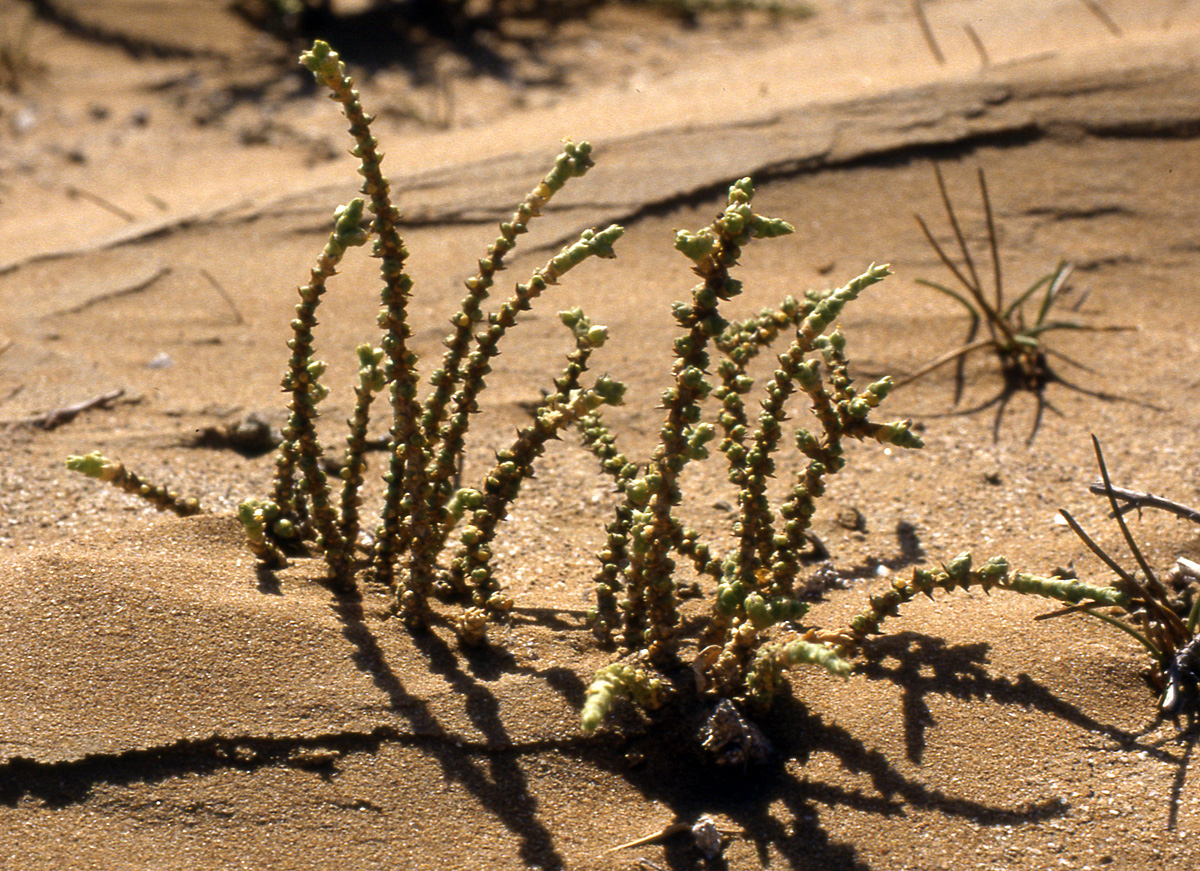
Cornulaca monacantha

Plants of the gravel plains further east include Cornulaca monacantha, Crotalaria persica, Calotropis procera and Taverniera spartea, and the parasitic desert hyacinth and the desert thumb. As the land rises up towards the mountains, the mesquite tree, an invasive species from Central America, has become established. The plains around Ras al-Khaimah in the northeast of the country, between the mountains and the sea, are the most heavily cultivated part of the country. The mountains have a cooler, more temperate climate and feature an abundance of Alpine flowers among the rocks, on slopes and in cracks, fissures and wadis.

Jabal Hafeet and the nearby Wadi Tarabat are home to rare flora unique to the region, such as Acridocarpus orientalis.

== Fauna ==
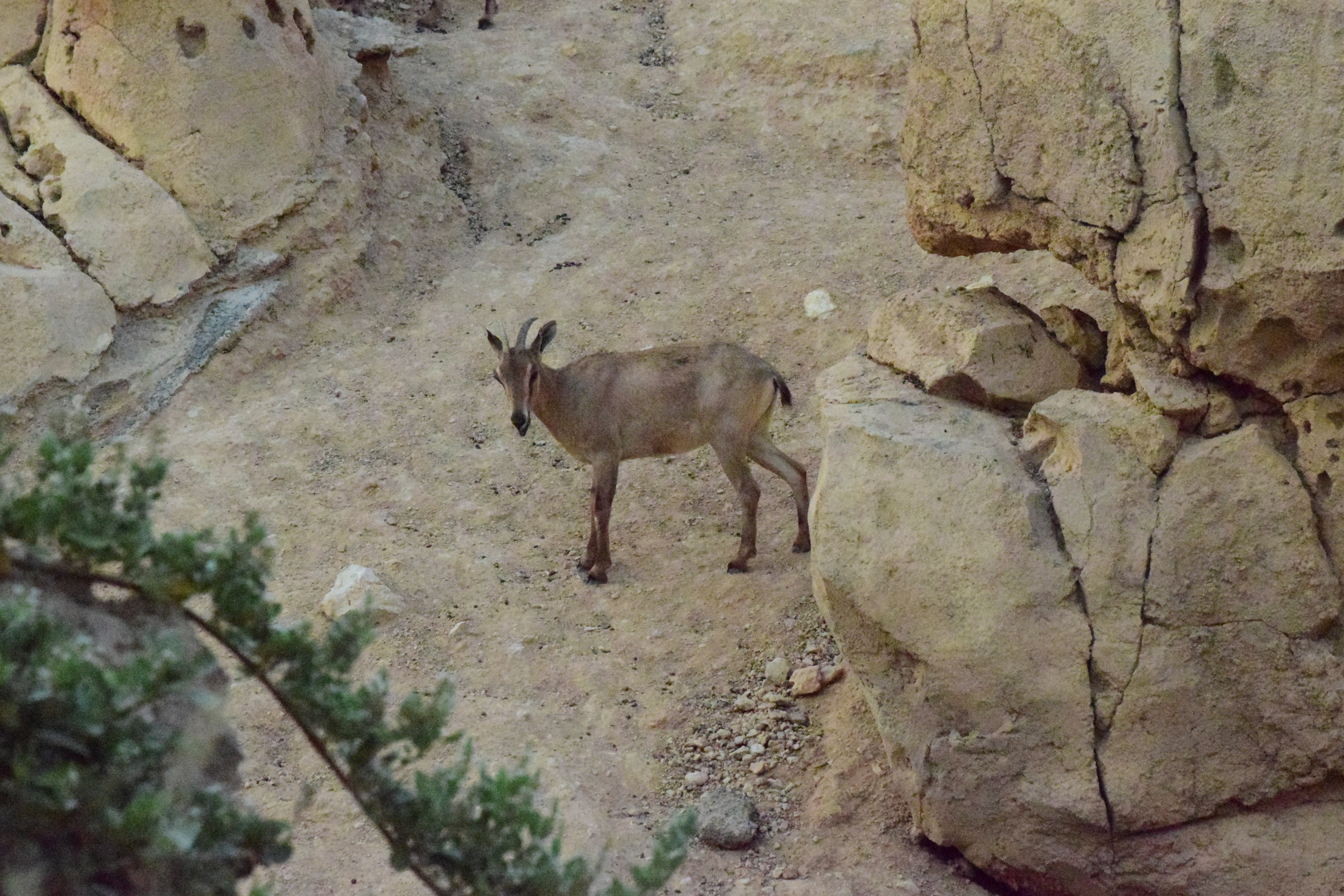
Arabian tahr in Al Ain Zoo

Over four hundred species of birds have been recorded in the United Arab Emirates, with about ninety species breeding regularly in the country while the remainder are winter visitors. The country is on the crossroads of two major migratory routes, one between the Palaearctic and Africa, the other between the Near East and the Indian subcontinent, and the migrants make use of the many types of habitat available.

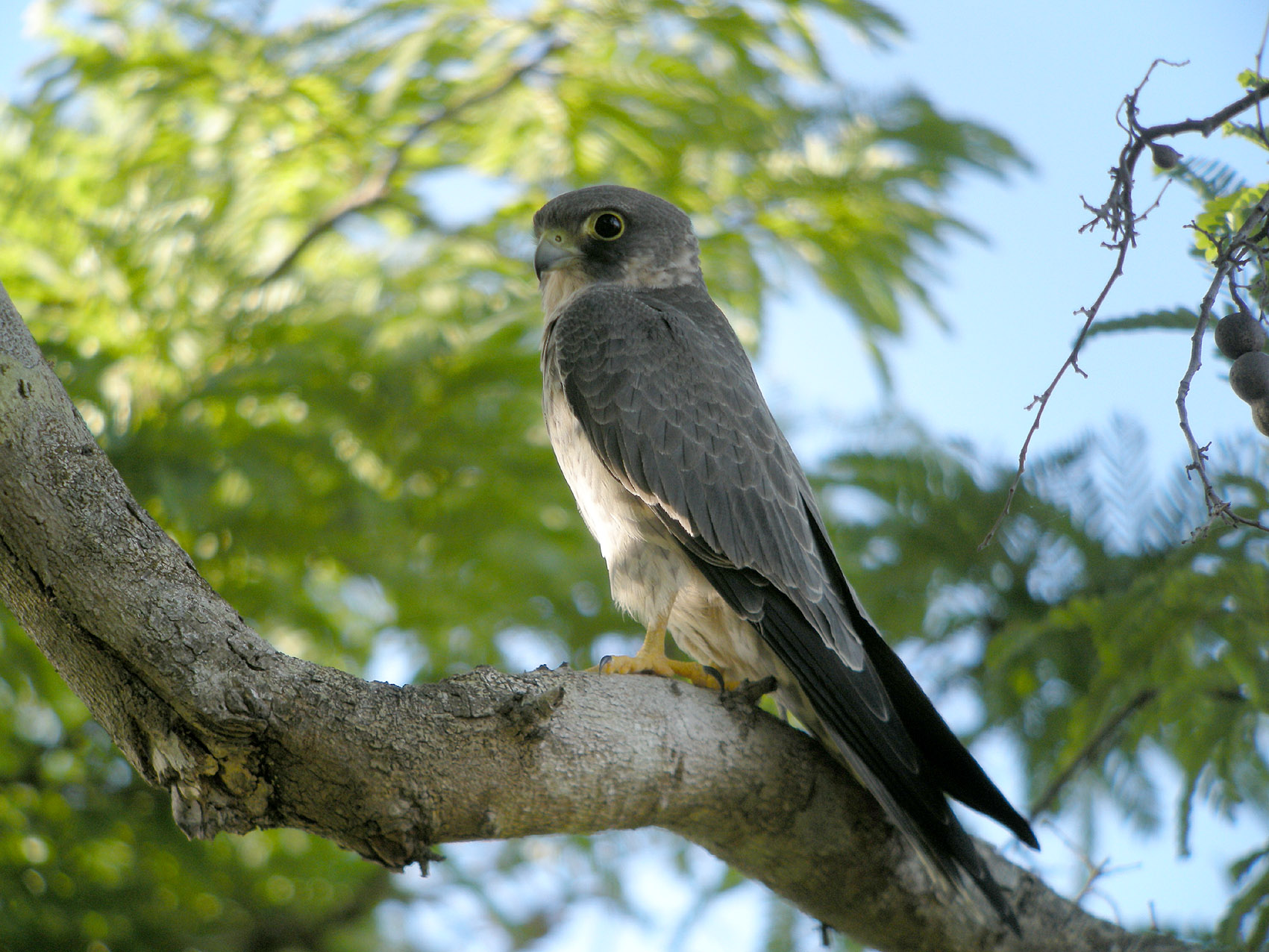
The sooty falcon breeds in the UAE

About 250,000 waders visit the Gulf shores and mudflats at peak migration time; these include the grey plover, the greater and lesser sand plovers, the crab plover, the Kentish plover and the broad-billed sandpiper. The coast, and particularly offshore islands are used by many seabirds. About twenty to thirty percent of the world's Socotra cormorants, about 200,000 birds, breed in the United Arab Emirates, but they are under threat from fishermen who fear for their livelihoods. Sooty gulls breed here, as do red-billed tropicbirds as well as several species of tern; white-cheeked, bridled and lesser crested tern.

Waters of the Persian Gulf along Abu Dhabi holds the world's largest population of Indo-Pacific humpbacked dolphins.

A large number of passerine birds breed in the deserts, salt flats, plains, dunes and mountains. Twelve species of wheatear have been recorded in the country as well as warblers, babblers, rollers, bulbuls, the desert lark and many others. The sooty falcon overwinters in Madagascar and breeds in the United Arab Emirates. Other than this, there are only a small number of raptor species; Bonelli's eagle, barbary falcon, short-toed snake eagle, long-legged buzzard and lappet-faced vulture.

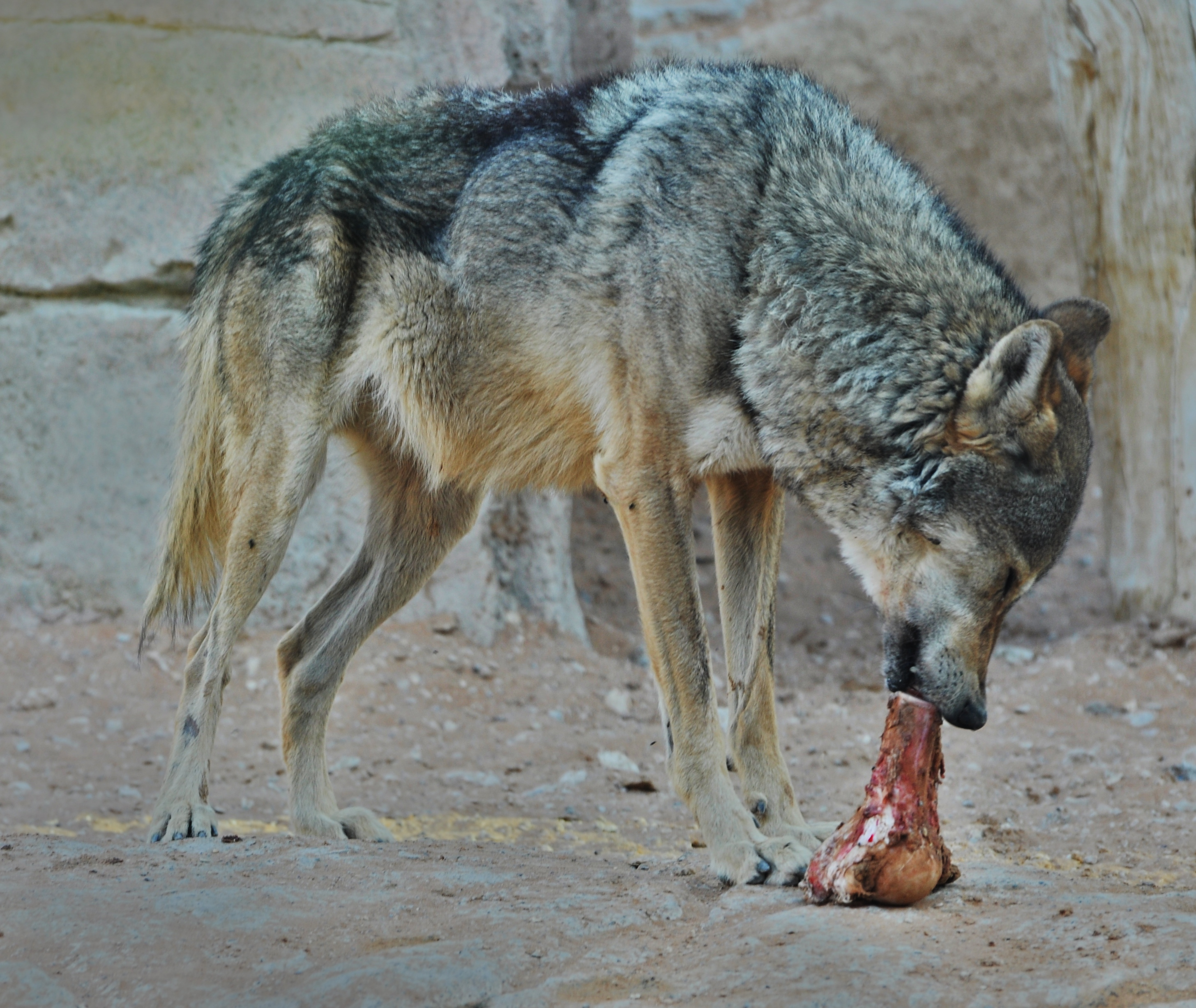
An Arabian wolf in Al Ain

Many of the large mammals found in the Arabian Peninsula were well-adapted to desert life in the harsh terrain, but were wiped out by human hunting in the last hundred years or so. Hunting is now banned in the United Arab Emirates, but feral goats and donkeys are plentiful and graze indiscriminately, lessening the chance for the native gazelles to recover from their reduced population sizes. Large terrestrial mammals still found in the United Arab Emirates include the Arabian tahr, the Arabian oryx and the sand gazelle. Carnivores include the Arabian wolf, the striped hyena, the red fox, the Blanford's fox, the Rüppell's fox, the Asiatic caracal, the Arabian wildcat, the sand cat and formerly the Arabian leopard. Other mammals include the Cape hare, the Brandt's hedgehog, the desert hedgehog and the long-eared hedgehog.

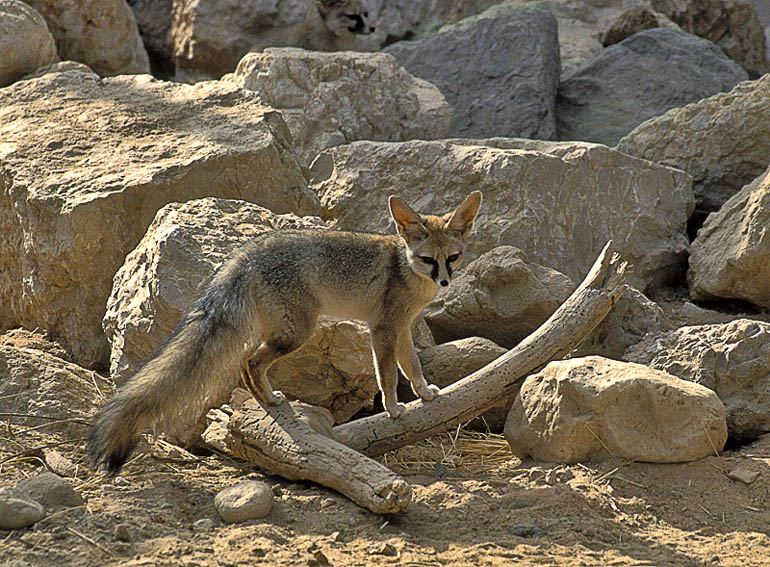
Blanford's fox

The Egyptian fruit bat is found here during most of the year, but moves around according to the availability of fruit. Insectivorous bats include the sac-winged bat, the mouse-tailed bat and the leaf-nosed bat. Small rodents include the lesser Egyptian jerboa, the Cheesman's gerbil and the Balochistan gerbil. Rather larger rodents are the Libyan jird and the Sundevall's jird which both favour desert habitats. The Cairo spiny mouse was found in the mountains for the first time in 1995.

Over 54 species of terrestrial reptiles have been recorded in the UAE. These include a large number of lizards, found in all environments from desert, to city, to mountain-top, and a single species of worm lizard. There are thirteen species of terrestrial snake, some of the largest being the sand boa, the saw-scaled viper and the horned viper, and four species of sea snake as well as green sea turtles present in the Persian Gulf. The Ru'us al-Jibal have a gecko of the genus Ptyodactylus named after them. There are two species of amphibian in the United Arab Emirates, the Arabian toad and the Dhofar toad; the former is more commonly seen as the Dhofar toad is nocturnal.

Sharjah's Breeding Centre for Endangered Arabian Wildlife (BCEAW) was established in 1998 originally for breeding the threatened wildlife, but has since become a center for the research and preservation of the indigenous plants and animals of the region.

In February 2019, the Environment Agency Abu Dhabi recorded the sighting of an Arabian caracal in Jebel Hafeet National Park in Al Ain Region, the first such sighting in the Emirate of Abu Dhabi since 1984.

The houbara is protected in the United Arab Emirates. In February 2019, 50 birds were released into the desert in Al Ain Region, to help conserve the birds and increase their number in the wild.

== See also ==
- List of mountains in the United Arab Emirates
- List of wadis of the United Arab Emirates
- Al Marmoom Desert Conservation Reserve, Dubai
- Al-Wathba Wetland Reserve, Abu Dhabi
- Ras Al Khor, Dubai
- Sir Abu Nu'ayr, Sharjah
- Sir Bani Yas, Abu Dhabi
- Wadi Wurayah, Fujairah
