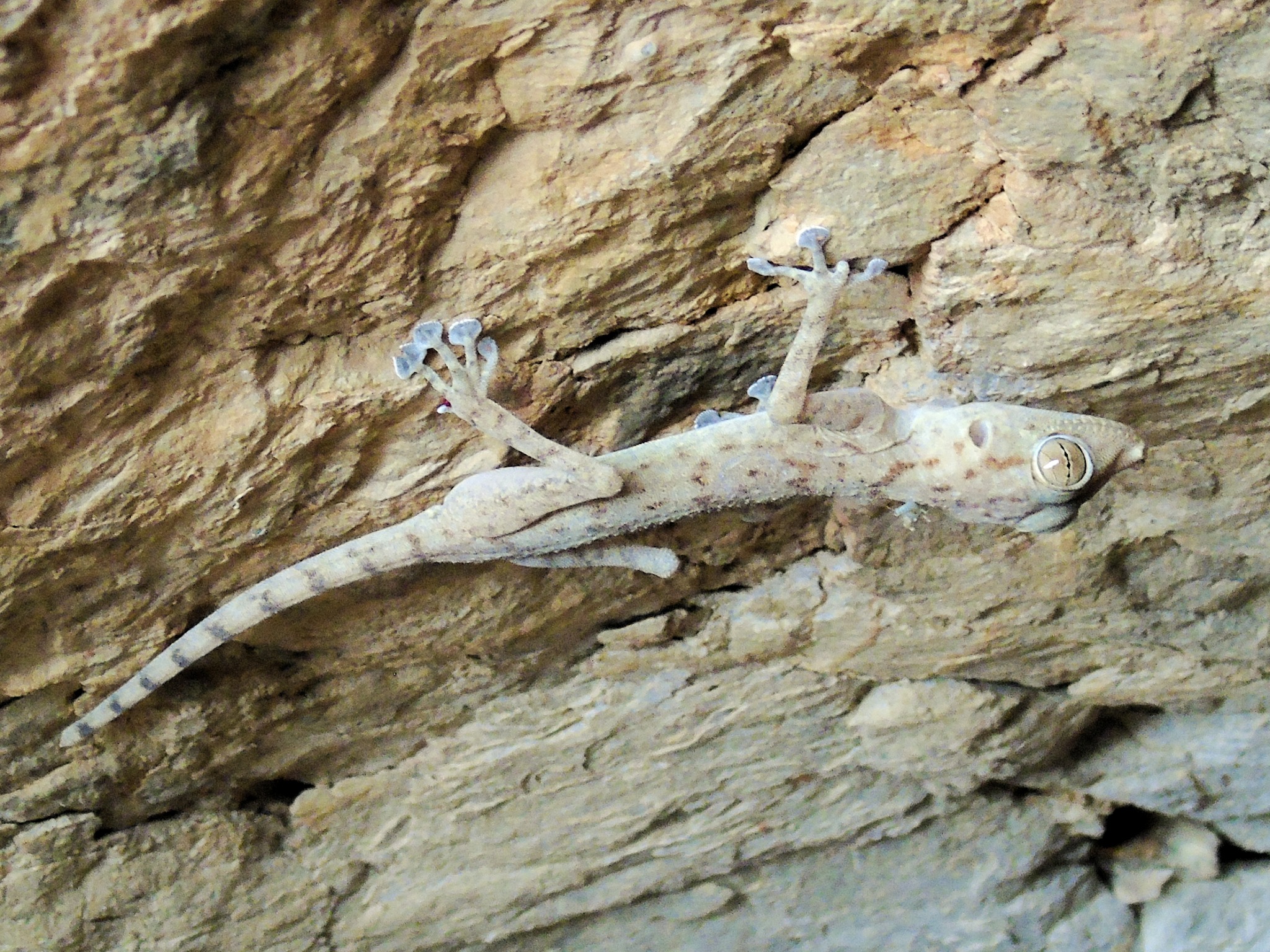

Conservation status
- Least Concern (IUCN 3.1)

Scientific classification
- Kingdom: Animalia
- Phylum: Chordata
- Class: Reptilia
- Order: Squamata
- Suborder: Gekkota
- Family: Phyllodactylidae
- Genus: Ptyodactylus
- Species: P. ruusaljibalicus

Binomial name
- Ptyodactylus ruusaljibalicus Simó-Riudalbas, Metallinou, de Pous, Els, Jayasinghe, Pentek-Zakar, Wilms, Al-Saadi & Carranza, 2017

= Ruus al Jibal fan-footed gecko =

Species of lizard

The Ruus al Jibal fan-footed gecko (Ptyodactylus ruusaljibalicus) is a species of lizard belonging to the family Phyllodactylidae and the genus Ptyodactylus, the fan-footed geckos. This gecko is endemic to the southeastern corner of the Arabian Peninsula.

== Taxonomy ==
The Ruus al Jibal fan-footed gecko was first formally described in 2017 by Marc Simó-Riudalbas, Margarita Metallinou, Philip de Pous, Johannes Els, Sithum Jayasinghe, Erika Péntek-Zakar, Thomas Wilms, Saleh Al-Saadi and Salvador Carranza with its type locality given as Musandam in Oman at 26.04214N 56.36966E. The sister taxon of this species is P. orlovi, which is also the nearest species in geographical range to it. The genus Ptyodactylus is classified within the family Phyllodactylidae in the suborder Gekkota, the geckos, of the order Squamata, the lizards and snakes.

== Etymology ==
The Ruus al Jibal fan-footed gecko belongs to the genus Pytodactylus, this name combines ptyo- a Greek verb meaning "to spit" or "to spit out", and the Greek word dactylos - meaning "finger." or "toe", probably an allusion to the splayed toes of these geckos. The specific name, ruusaljibalicus, refers to Ruus Al Jibal, a name which means “Heads of the Mountains”, the area this species is likely to be endmeic to.

== Description ==
The Ruus al Jibal fan-footed gecko is one of the larger Ptyodactylus species with a maximum recorded snout-vent length of 90.01 mm (3.544 in) for males and 85.94 mm (3.383 in) for the only known female. It has a slender head with a lengthy snout. There are 12 or 13 infralabial scales and between 12 and 14 supralabial scales. There are 9 to 11 irregular longitudinal rows of large round, enlarged and slightly keeled tubercles along the back. There are no enlarged tubercles on the upper sides of the feet; there are two obvious cloacal tubercles on either side of the base of the tail; The upper body is a uniform pale grey, with some specimens showing dark brown cross bands that run onto the tail. The lower body is white.

== Distribution and habitat ==
The Ruus al Jibal fan-footed gecko is endemic to the Musandam Peninsula, also known as the Ruus Al Jibal in southeastern Arabia in Oman and the United Arab Emirates. This gecko is found in rocky mountainour regions including cliffs, caves, rocks and boulders.

== See also ==
- Wildlife of Oman
- Wildlife of the United Arab Emirates
