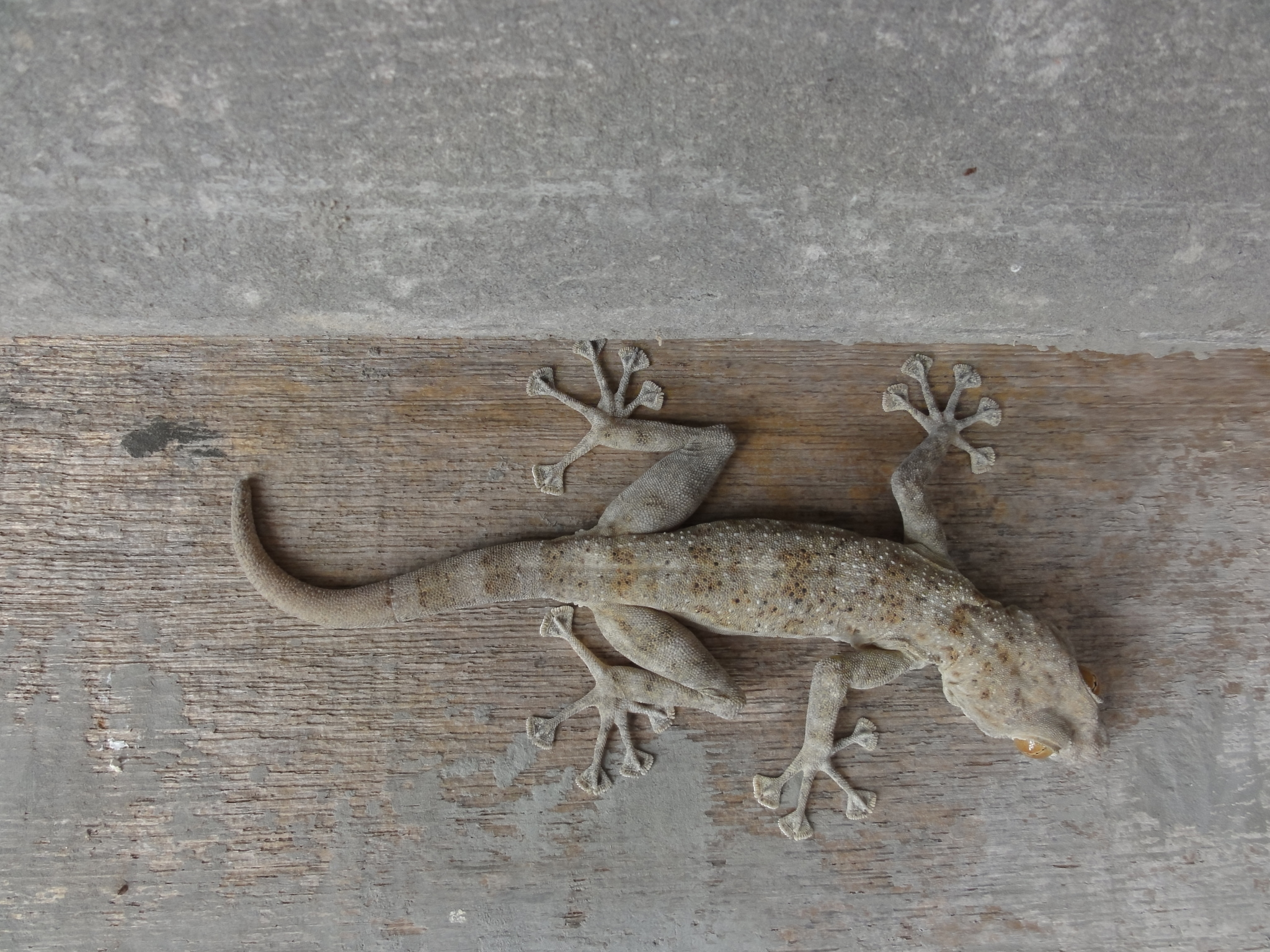

Scientific classification
- Kingdom: Animalia
- Phylum: Chordata
- Class: Reptilia
- Order: Squamata
- Suborder: Gekkota
- Family: Phyllodactylidae
- Genus: Ptyodactylus
- Species: P. dhofarensis

Binomial name
- Ptyodactylus dhofarensis Nazarov, Melnikov & Melnikova, 2013

= Ptyodactylus dhofarensis =

Species of lizard

Ptyodactylus dhofarensis is a species of gecko. It is endemic to Oman.

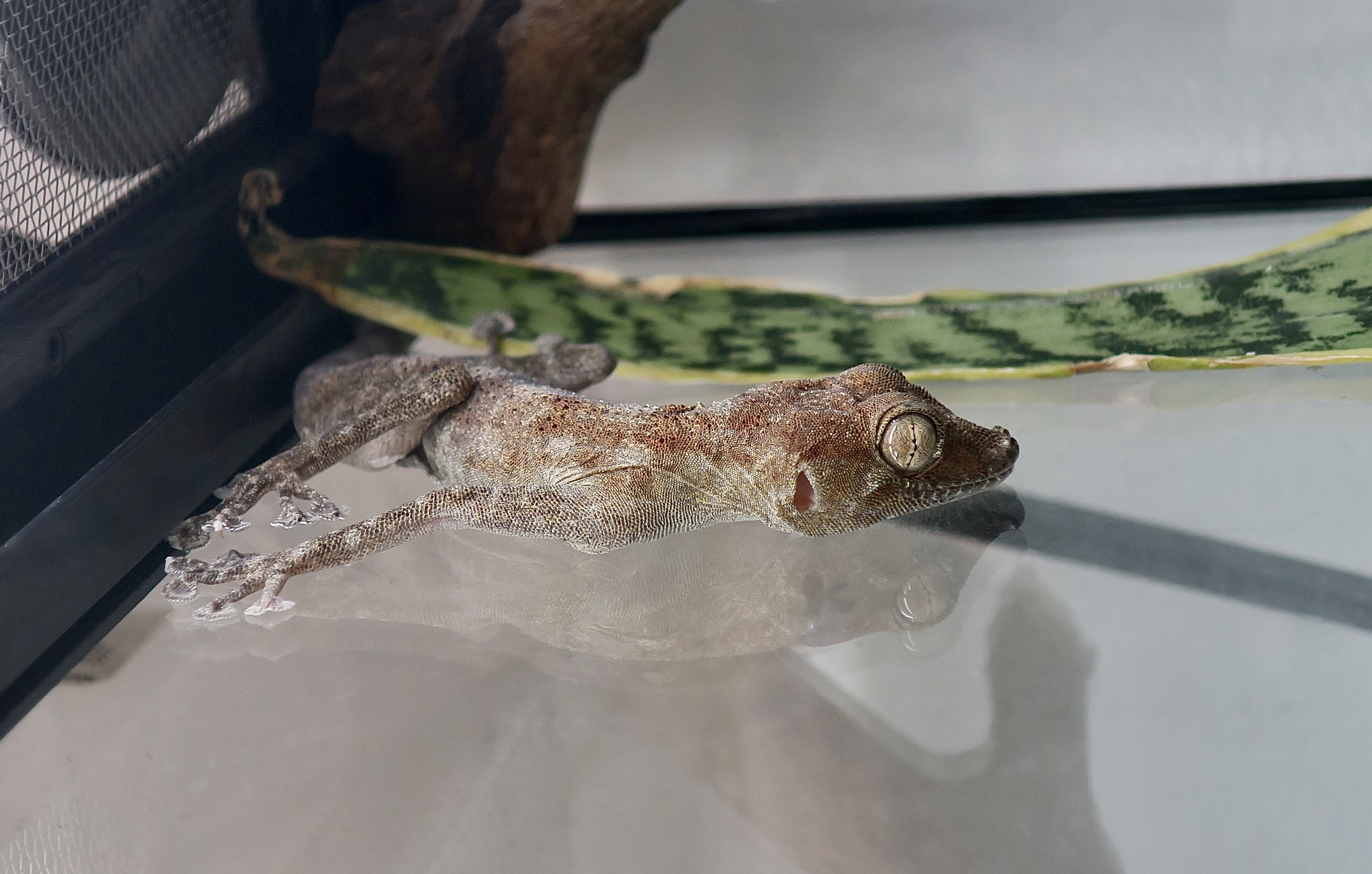
A Dhofar fan-toed gecko (Ptyodactylus dhofarensis) at The Gecko Gallery NYC.
