= Riva and Padial's fan-footed gecko =

Scientific classification
- Kingdom: Animalia
- Phylum: Chordata
- Class: Reptilia
- Order: Squamata
- Suborder: Gekkota
- Family: Phyllodactylidae
- Genus: Ptyodactylus
- Species: P. rivapadiali

Binomial name
- Ptyodactylus rivapadiali Trape, 2017

Species of lizard

Riva and Padial's fan-footed gecko (Ptyodactylus rivapadiali) is a species of gecko. It is endemic to Mauritania.
