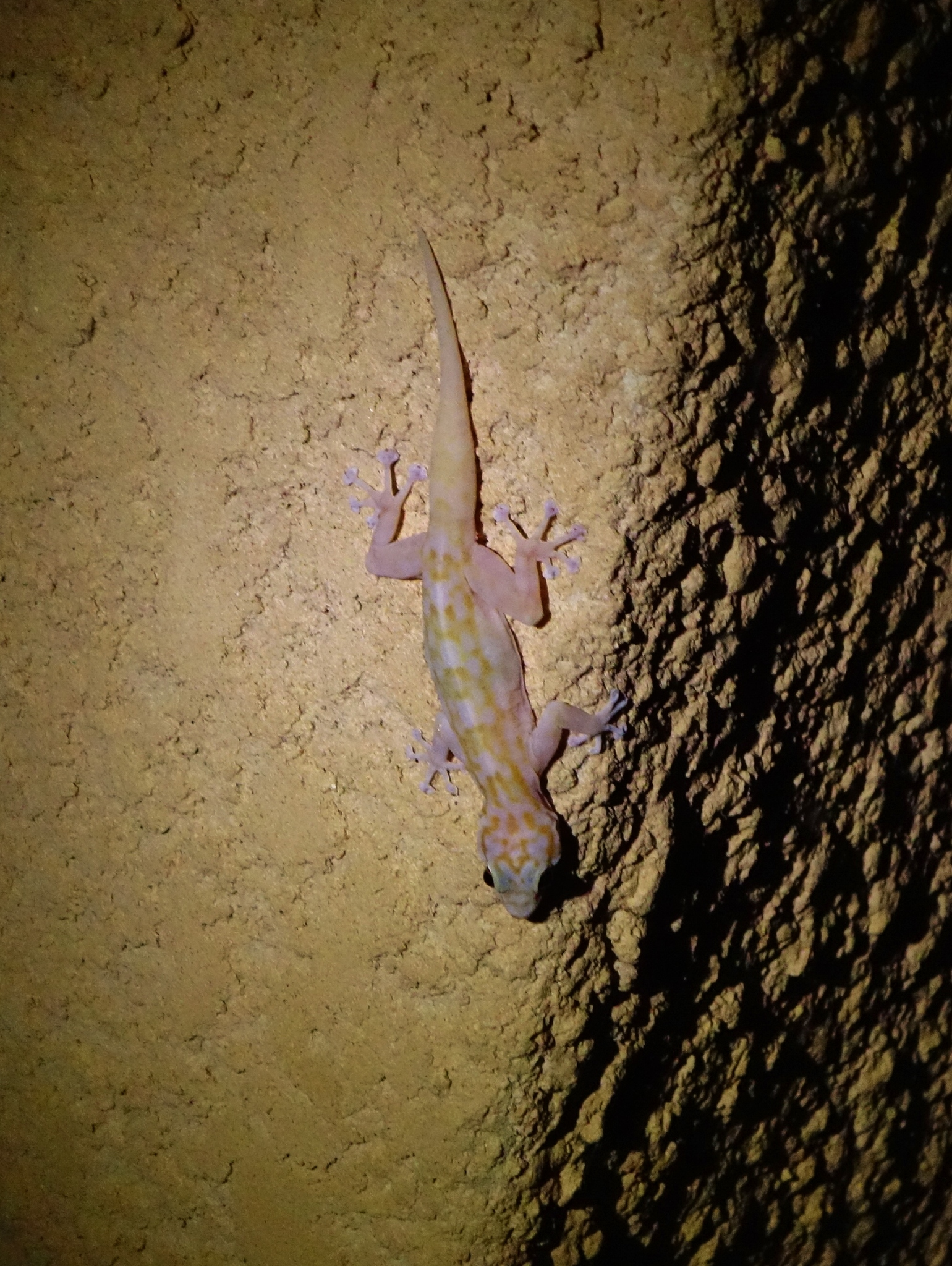

Conservation status
- Least Concern (IUCN 3.1)

Scientific classification
- Kingdom: Animalia
- Phylum: Chordata
- Class: Reptilia
- Order: Squamata
- Suborder: Gekkota
- Family: Phyllodactylidae
- Genus: Ptyodactylus
- Species: P. ragazzii

Binomial name
- Ptyodactylus ragazzii Anderson, 1898

Synonyms
- Ptyodactylus hasselquistii var. ragazzi Anderson, 1898; Ptyodactylus hasselquistii ragazzii — Kluge, 1993; Ptyodactylus ragazzii — Schleich, Kästle & Kabisch, 1996

= Ragazzi's fan-footed gecko =

Species of lizard

Ragazzi's fan-footed gecko (Ptyodactylus ragazzii), also known commonly as the Sahelian fan-toed gecko, is a species of lizard in the family Phyllodactylidae. The species is endemic to northern Africa.

== Etymology ==
The specific name, ragazzii, is in honor of Italian physician Vincenzo Ragazzi (1856–1929) of the Modena Natural History Society.

== Geographic range ==
P. ragazzii is found in Algeria, Benin, Burkina Faso, Cameroon, Chad, Djibouti, Egypt, Ethiopia, Ghana, Libya, Mali, Mauritania, Niger, Nigeria, Somalia, Sudan, and Togo.

== Habitat ==
The preferred natural habitat of P. ragazzii is rocky areas in desert, shrubland, and savanna, at altitudes from sea level to 2,500 m (8,200 ft).

== Behavior ==
P. ragazzii is nocturnal, crepuscular, and rupicolous.

== Reproduction ==
P. ragazzii is oviparous. Clutch size is two eggs. An adult female may lay as many as six clutches per year.
