= Pakistan fan-fingered gecko =

Scientific classification
- Kingdom: Animalia
- Phylum: Chordata
- Class: Reptilia
- Order: Squamata
- Suborder: Gekkota
- Family: Phyllodactylidae
- Genus: Ptyodactylus
- Species: P. homolepis

Binomial name
- Ptyodactylus homolepis Blanford, 1876

Species of lizard

The Pakistan fan-fingered gecko (Ptyodactylus homolepis) is a species of gecko. It is endemic to Pakistan.
