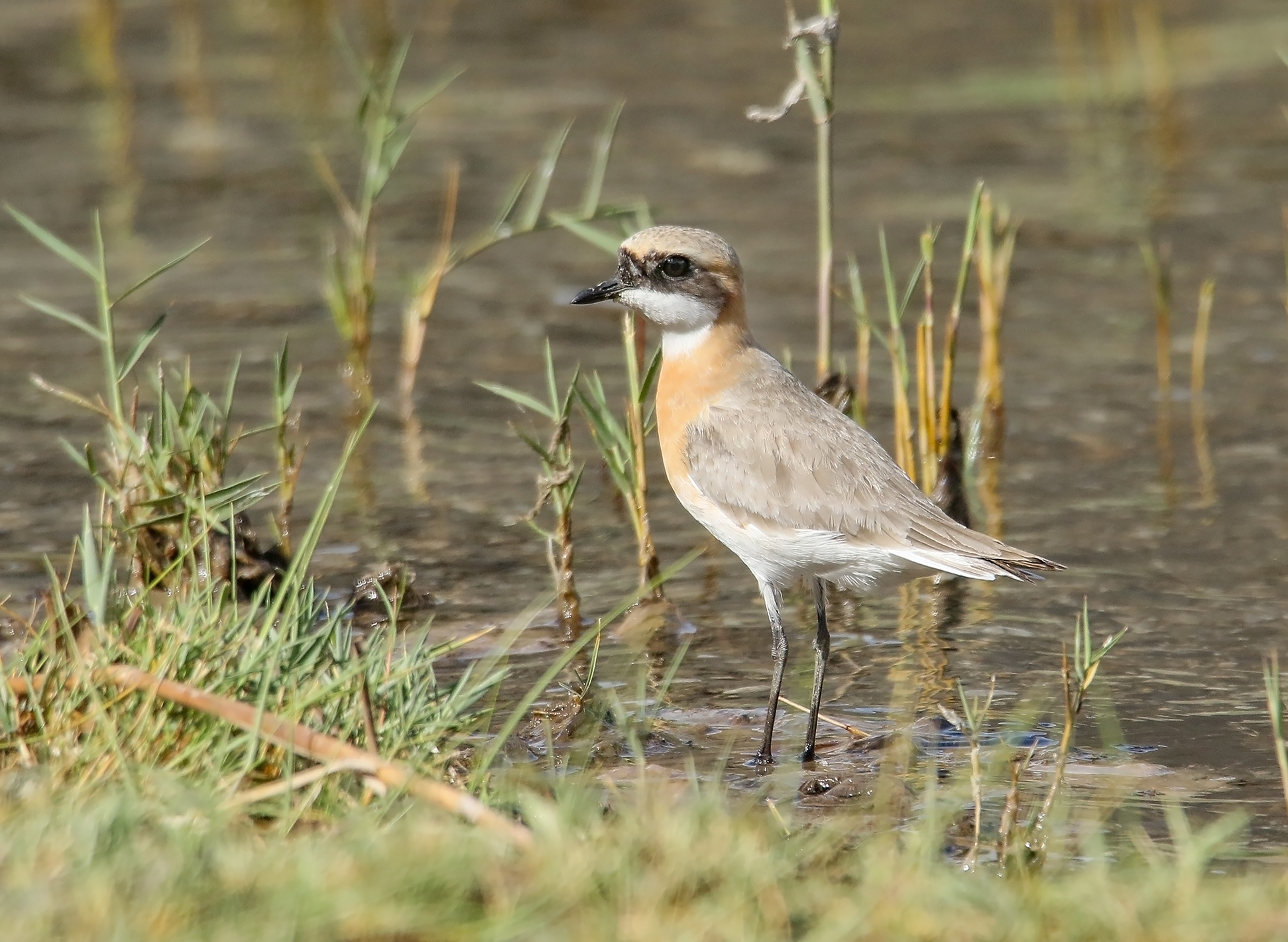

Conservation status
- Least Concern (IUCN 3.1)

Scientific classification
- Kingdom: Animalia
- Phylum: Chordata
- Class: Aves
- Order: Charadriiformes
- Family: Charadriidae
- Genus: Anarhynchus
- Species: A. atrifrons

Binomial name
- Anarhynchus atrifrons (Wagler, 1829)

Synonyms
- Charadrius atrifrons (protonym)

= Tibetan sand plover =

Species of bird

The Tibetan sand plover (Anarhynchus atrifrons) is a small wader in the plover family of birds, breeds in Pamir Mountains, Tian Shan, Tibetan Plateau and south Mongolia, winters in east and south Africa, south, east and southeast Asia.

== Taxonomy ==
It was previously considered conspecific with the Siberian (lesser) sand plover, and includes three subspecies: A. a. atrifrons, breeds in Tibet, A. a. pamirensis breeds in Pamir Mountains, and A. a. schaeferi, breeds in Qinghai.

A study published in 2022 proposed that the "mongolus" group of lesser sand plover is the sister group of greater sand plover, and "atrifrons" group is the sister group of them also. So a taxonomic split of lesser sand plover was needed. The authors suggested new scientific and common English name for them:

- Siberian sand plover (Anarhynchus mongolus), A. m. mongolus and A. m. stegmanni;
- Tibetan sand plover (Anarhynchus atrifrons), A. a. atrifrons, A. a. pamirensis and A. a. schaeferi;
- Desert sand plover (Anarhynchus leschenaultii), currently greater sand plover.

The International Ornithologists' Union accepted the split and renaming of the lesser sand plover in 2023, erecting the Tibetan sand plover as a full species.

== Description ==
It is a medium-sized plover with a pale throat, brown back and white underparts. Adults in summer plumage have a black mask and a light orange chest and neck; males are on average paler than females. Adults in winter plumage and juveniles have light brown upperparts and white underparts, with varying amounts of white on the forehead and back.
