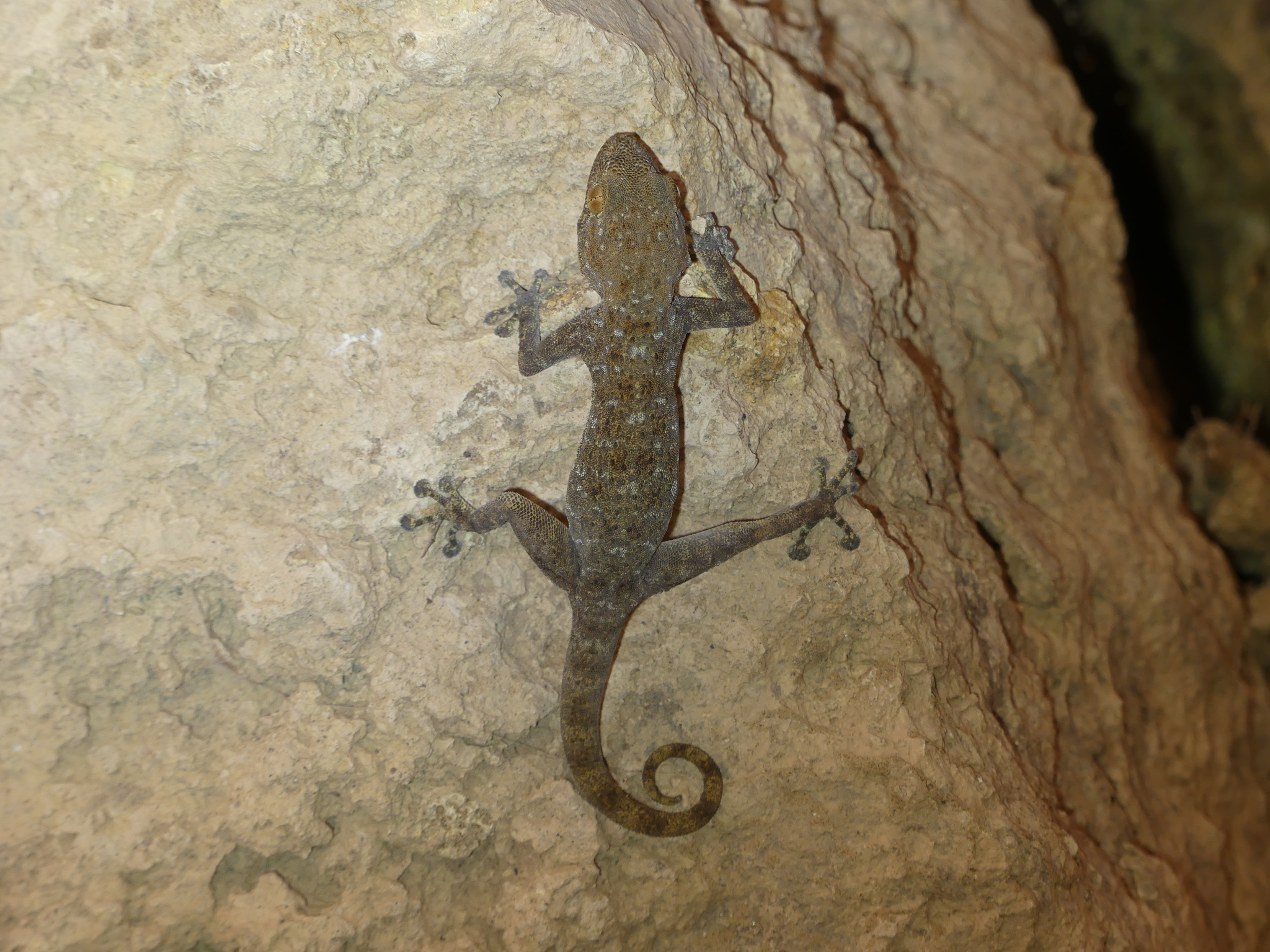
- Ptyodactylus oudrii

Conservation status
- Least Concern (IUCN 3.1)

Scientific classification
- Kingdom: Animalia
- Phylum: Chordata
- Class: Reptilia
- Order: Squamata
- Suborder: Gekkota
- Family: Phyllodactylidae
- Genus: Ptyodactylus
- Species: P. oudrii

Binomial name
- Ptyodactylus oudrii Lataste, 1880

Synonyms
- Ptyodactylus oudrii Lataste, 1880; Ptyodactylus hasselquistii var. oudrii — Anderson, 1898; Ptyodactylus hasselquistii oudrii — Loveridge, 1947; Ptyodactylus oudrii — Heimes, 1987

= Oudri's fan-footed gecko =

Species of lizard

Oudri's fan-footed gecko (Ptyodactylus oudrii), also known commonly as the Algerian fan-fingered gecko and Oudri's fan-fingered gecko, is a species of lizard in the family Phyllodactylidae. The species is endemic to the Maghreb region of northwestern Africa.

== Etymology ==
The specific name, oudrii, is in honor of General Émile Oudri (1843–1919) of the French Foreign Legion.

== Geographic range ==
Ptyodactylus oudrii is found in Algeria and Morocco.

== Habitat ==
The natural habitats of Ptyodactylus oudrii are subtropical or tropical dry shrubland and rocky areas.

== Reproduction ==
Ptyodactylus oudrii is oviparous. Clutch size is one or two eggs, and a female may lay as many as six clutches per year.
