= Ptyodactylus ananjevae =

Scientific classification
- Kingdom: Animalia
- Phylum: Chordata
- Class: Reptilia
- Order: Squamata
- Suborder: Gekkota
- Family: Phyllodactylidae
- Genus: Ptyodactylus
- Species: P. ananjevae

Binomial name
- Ptyodactylus ananjevae Nazarov, Melnikov & Melnikova, 2013

Species of lizard

Ptyodactylus ananjevae is a species of gecko in the family Phyllodactylidae. The species is endemic to Jordan.

== Etymology ==
The specific name, ananjevae, is in honor of Russian herpetologist Natalia Ananjeva.

== Geographic range ==
P. ananjevae is found in southern Jordan.

== Description ==
P. ananjevae may attain a snout-to-vent length (SVL) of 8 cm (3.1 in), with a tail equal to or slightly longer than SVL.
