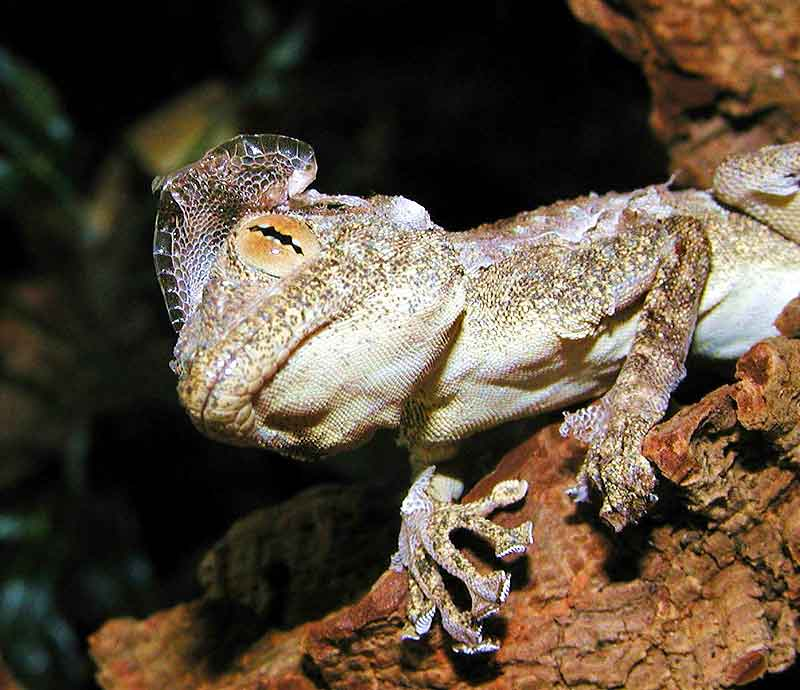

Conservation status
- Least Concern (IUCN 3.1)

Scientific classification
- Kingdom: Animalia
- Phylum: Chordata
- Class: Reptilia
- Order: Squamata
- Suborder: Gekkota
- Family: Phyllodactylidae
- Genus: Ptyodactylus
- Species: P. hasselquistii

Binomial name
- Ptyodactylus hasselquistii (Donndorff, 1798)

Synonyms
- Lacerta hasselquistii Donndorff, 1798; Gecko ascalabotes Merrem, 1820; Gecko lobatus Lichtenstein, 1823; Ptyodactylus lobatus — Gray, 1825; Ptyodactylus hasselquistii — A.M.C. Duméril & Bibron, 1836

= Ptyodactylus hasselquistii =

Species of lizard

Ptyodactylus hasselquistii, commonly known as the fan-footed gecko, Hasselquist's fan-footed gecko, and the yellow fan-fingered gecko, is a species of gecko, a lizard in the family Phyllodactylidae. The species is native to northern Africa and western Asia.

== Etymology ==
The specific name, hasselquistii, is in honor of Swedish naturalist Fredrik Hasselquist.

== Description ==
Ptyodactylus hasselquistii grows to a snout-to-vent length (SVL) of 96 mm (3.8 in).

== Geographic range ==
Ptyodactylus hasselquistii is found in Algeria, Cameroon, Egypt, Eritrea, eastern Ethiopia, Iraq, Israel, Jordan, Lebanon, Saudi Arabia (including the Farasan Islands), northern Somalia, Sudan, and Syria.

The type locality is Cairo, Egypt.

== Reproduction ==
Ptyodactylus hasselquistii is oviparous. Clutch size is two eggs.

== Subspecies ==
Two subspecies are recognized as being valid, including the nominotypical subspecies.

- Ptyodactylus hasselquistii hasselquistii (Donndorff, 1798)
- Ptyodactylus hasselquistii krameri Y. Werner, 1995 – Kramer's yellow fan-fingered gecko

Nota bene: A trinomial authority in parentheses indicates that the subspecies was originally described in a genus other than Ptyodactylus.
