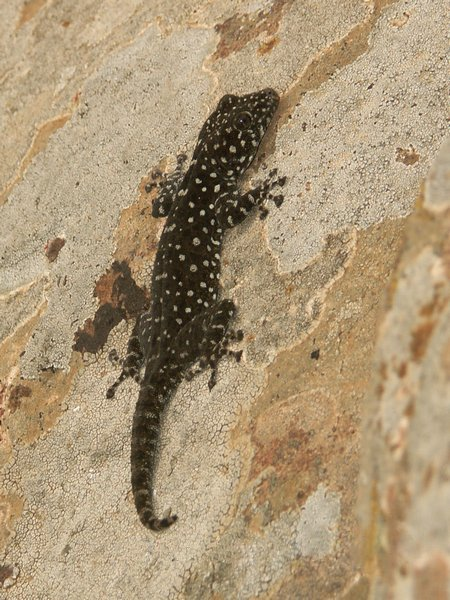

Conservation status
- Least Concern (IUCN 3.1)

Scientific classification
- Kingdom: Animalia
- Phylum: Chordata
- Class: Reptilia
- Order: Squamata
- Suborder: Gekkota
- Family: Phyllodactylidae
- Genus: Ptyodactylus
- Species: P. puiseuxi

Binomial name
- Ptyodactylus puiseuxi Boutan, 1893

Synonyms
- Ptyodactylus puiseuxi Boutan, 1893; Ptyodactylus bischoffsheimi Boutan, 1893; Ptyodactylus montmahoui Boutan, 1893; Ptyodactylus barroisi Boutan, 1893; Ptyodactylus lobatus syriacus Peracca, 1894; Ptyodactylus lobatus sancti-montis Barbour, 1914; Ptyodactylus hasselquistii puisieuxi [sic] Esterbauer, 1985 (ex errore); Ptyodactylus puiseuxi — Kluge, 1993; Ptyodactylus puiseuxi — Rösler, 2000

= Ptyodactylus puiseuxi =

Species of lizard

Ptyodactylus puiseuxi, also known commonly as the Israeli fan-fingered gecko, the northern fan-footed gecko, and the Syrian fan-fingered gecko, is a species of lizard in the family Phyllodactylidae. The species is native to the Middle East.

== Etymology ==
The specific name, puiseuxi, is in honour of French astronomer Victor Alexandre Puiseux.

== Description ==
Ptyodactylus puiseuxi is a medium-sized gecko. It is light to dark brown, with numerous white spots on the dorsal surface. The head is large and triangular. The tail has several white bands, and is shorter than the overall head and body length (snout-to-vent length). The dorsal scales are small and granular.

== Geographic range ==
Ptyodactylus puiseuxi is found in Iraq, Israel, Jordan, Lebanon, Saudi Arabia, and Syria.

== Habitat ==
The preferred natural habitats of Ptyodactylus puiseuxi are desert and shrubland, at elevations up to 1,990 m (6,530 ft), but it has also been found in artificial habitats such as rural gardens.

== Behaviour ==
Ptyodactylus puiseuxi usually emerges after dark to feed, but can be seen in rocky, shady areas, and near caves.

== Reproduction ==
Ptyodactylus puiseuxi is oviparous.
