= Lake Zakher =

Artificial lake in United Arab Emirates

- بُحَيْرَة زَاخِر (Arabic)
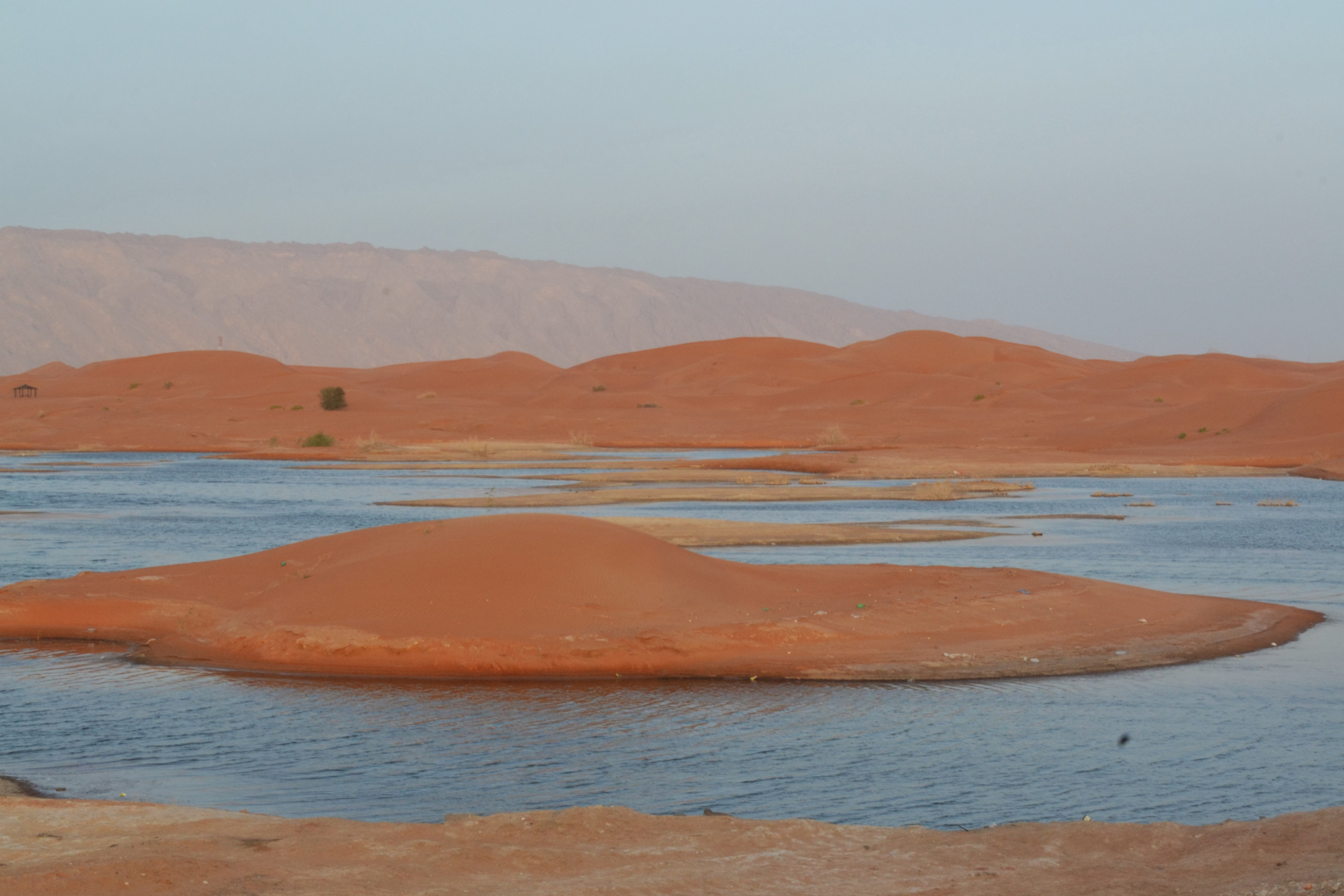

- Location within United Arab Emirates Location within Persian Gulf Location within West and Central Asia
- Location: Al Ain, Eastern Region of the Emirate of Abu Dhabi, the UAE
- Coordinates: 24.089097°N 55.633471°E
- Type: Man-made lake
- Basin countries: United Arab Emirates
- Settlements: Al-Ain

Lake Zakher (Arabic: بُحَيْرَة زَاخِر, romanized: Buḥayrat Zākhir) is a man-made lake in Al Ain, Abu Dhabi, the UAE. An unintended byproduct of the UAE’s desalination-linked water management practices, the lake was created from treated waste water that was released onto land. It raised groundwater levels and eventually resulted in the development of a lake.

== See also ==
- Wildlife of the United Arab Emirates
