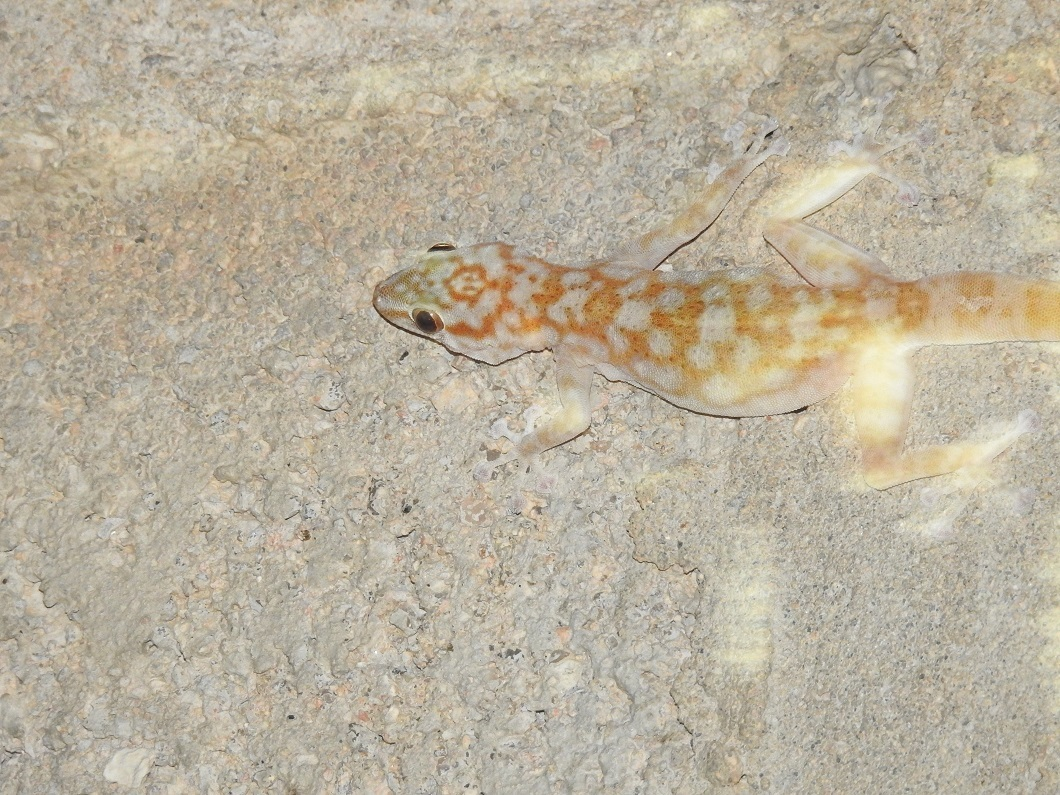

Scientific classification
- Kingdom: Animalia
- Phylum: Chordata
- Class: Reptilia
- Order: Squamata
- Suborder: Gekkota
- Family: Phyllodactylidae
- Genus: Ptyodactylus
- Species: P. togoensis

Binomial name
- Ptyodactylus togoensis Tornier, 1901

= Togo fan-footed gecko =

Species of lizard

The Togo fan-footed gecko (Ptyodactylus togoensis) is a species of gecko. It is found in northern Africa.
