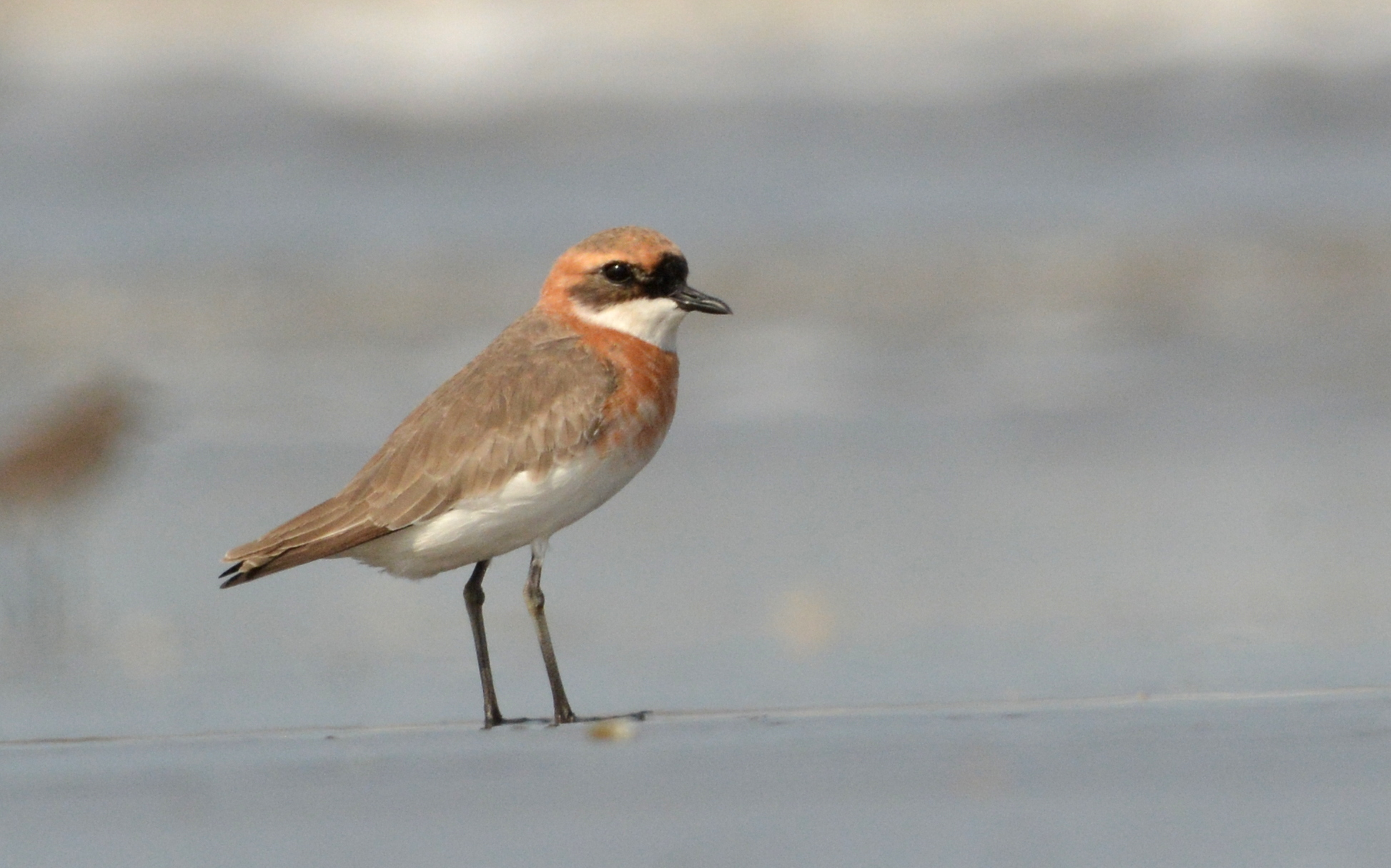

Conservation status
- Endangered (IUCN 3.1)

Scientific classification
- Kingdom: Animalia
- Phylum: Chordata
- Class: Aves
- Order: Charadriiformes
- Family: Charadriidae
- Genus: Anarhynchus
- Species: A. mongolus

Binomial name
- Anarhynchus mongolus (Pallas, 1776)

Subspecies
- A. m. mongolus; A. m. stegmanni

Synonyms
- Charadrius mongolus (protonym)

= Siberian sand plover =

Species of bird

The Siberian sand plover (Anarhynchus mongolus) is a small wader in the plover family of birds. The International Ornithologists' Union split the Tibetan sand plover from the lesser sand plover and changed its vernacular name to Siberian sand plover. The specific mongolus is Latin and refers to Mongolia, which at the time of naming referred to a larger area than the present country.

== Taxonomy ==
The Siberian sand plover and the Tibetan sand plover were previously considered to belong to the same species known as the "lesser sand plover", consisting of five races within the species complex. However, a study published in 2022 suggested that the "mongolus" group (currently identified as the Siberian sand plover) within the lesser sand plover is actually the sister group of the greater sand plover. Additionally, the "atrifrons" group (representing the Tibetan sand plover) is the sister group of the monophyletic group formed by the "mongolus" group and the greater sand plover.

- Tibetan sand plover (the "atrifrons" group of lesser sand plover)
- - Siberian sand plover (the "mongolus" group of lesser sand plover)
  - greater sand plover

This means that the lesser sand plover is paraphyletic. Therefore a taxonomic revision was needed. The authors suggested new scientific and common English names for them. The large East Asian forms mongolus and stegmanni are currently identified as the Siberian sand plover, Anarhynchus mongolus; and the Tibetan Plateau form is now known as the Tibetan sand plover, Anarhynchus atrifrons, which includes the three races atrifrons, pamirensis and schaeferi.

IOU accepted the split and renaming of the lesser sand plover in 2023.

== Description ==
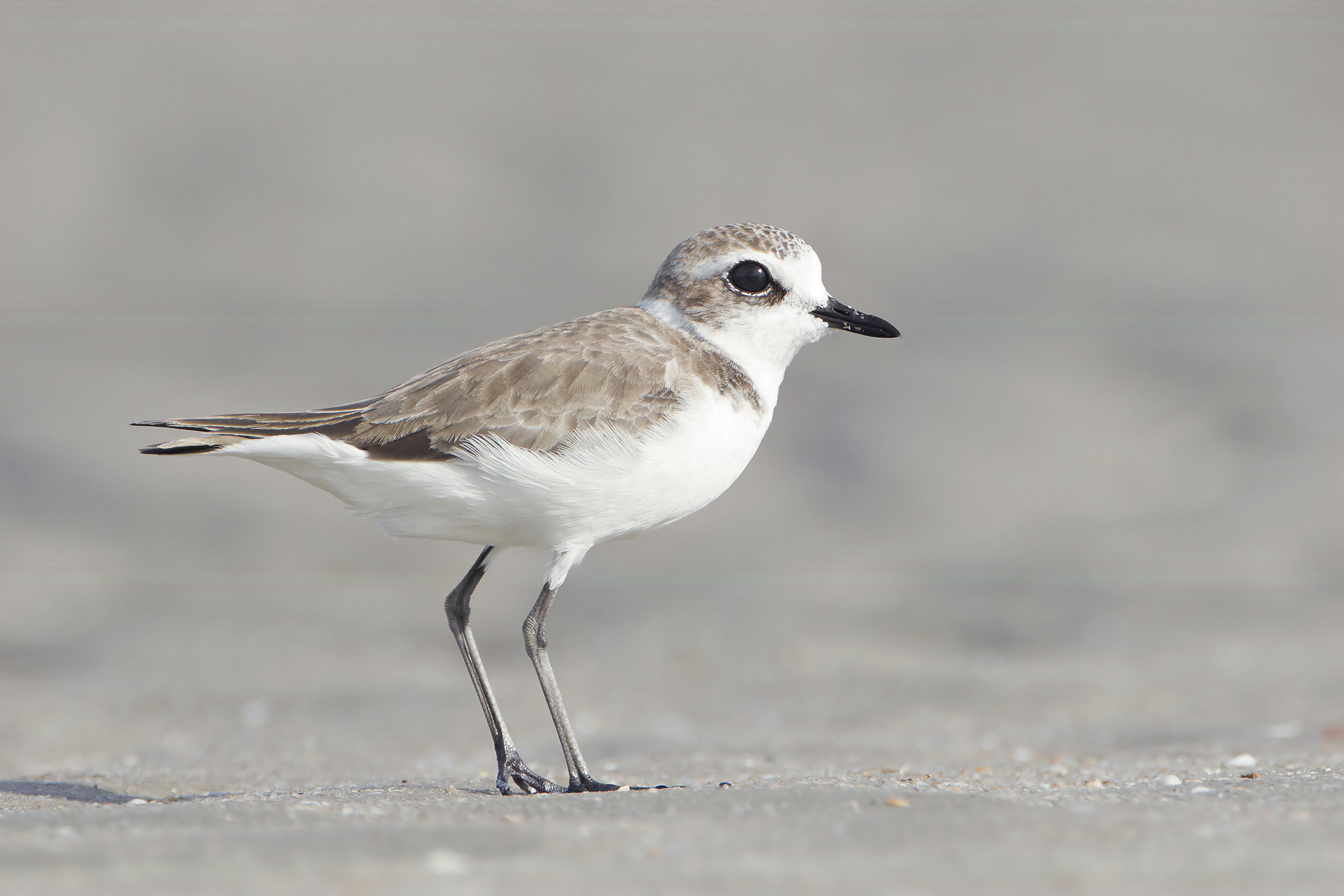

This chunky plover is long-legged and long-billed. Breeding males have grey backs and white underparts. The breast, forehead and nape are chestnut, and there is a black eye mask. The female is duller, and winter and juvenile birds lack the chestnut, apart from a hint of rufous on the head. Legs are dark and the bill black.

In all plumages, this species is very similar to the greater sand plover, Charadrius leschenaultii. Separating the species may be straightforward in mixed wintering flocks on an Indian beach, where the difference in size and structure is obvious; it is more difficult to identify a lone vagrant to western Europe, where both species are very rare. The problem is compounded in that the Middle Eastern race of greater sand plover is the most similar to the lesser. The lesser usually has darker legs, a white forehead, and a more even white wing bar than the greater.

== Distribution ==
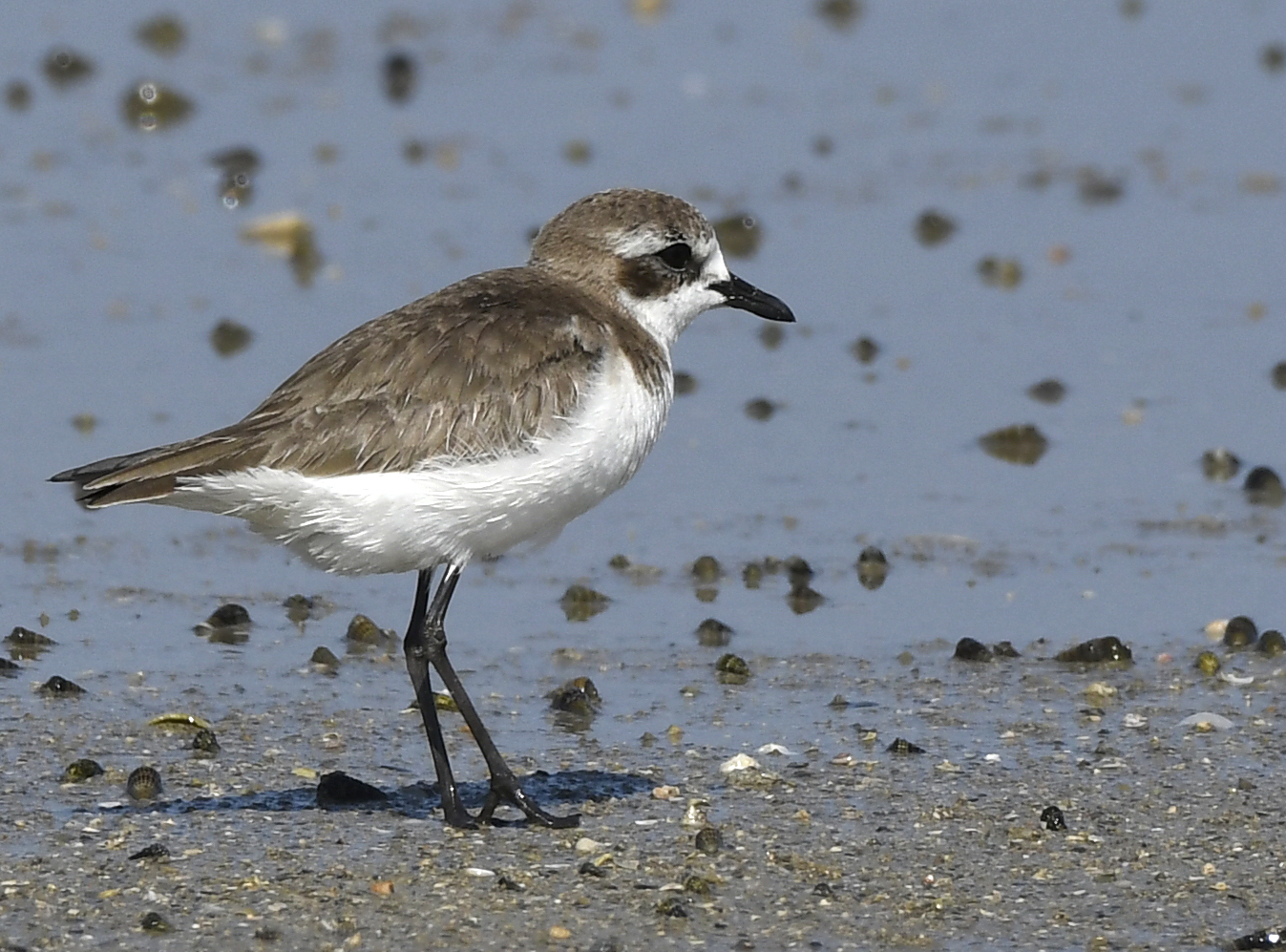
In Jamnagar, Gujarat, India

It breeds discontinuously across bare coastal plains in north-eastern Siberia, with the Mongolian plover in the eastern part of the range; it has also bred in Alaska. It nests in a bare ground scrape, laying three eggs. This species is strongly migratory, wintering on sandy beaches in east and southeast Asia and Australia.

== Ecology ==
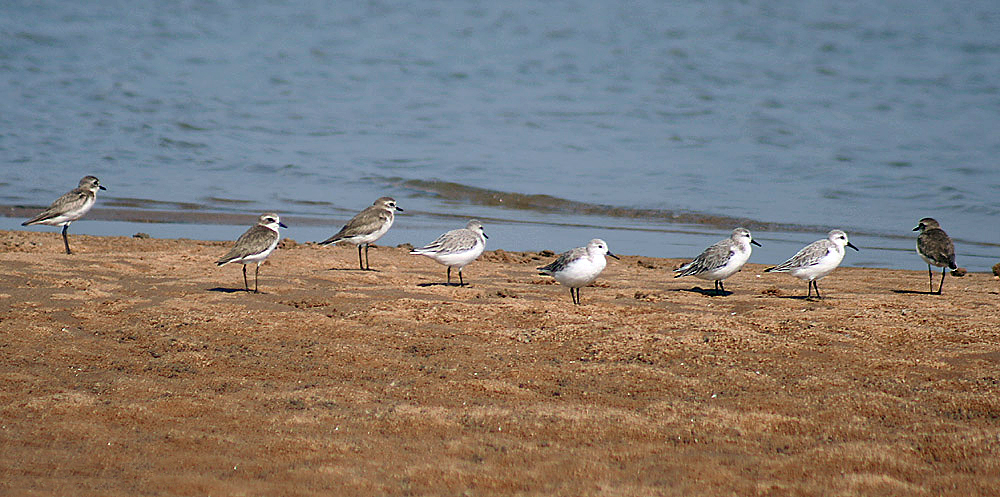
Siberian sand plovers with sanderlings in Chilika, Odisha, India

The Siberian sand plover feeds on insects, crustaceans and annelid worms, which are obtained by a run-and-pause technique, rather than the steady probing of some other wader groups. This species takes fewer steps and shorter pauses than the greater sand plover when feeding.

The flight call is a hard trill.

The Siberian sand plover is one of the species to which the Agreement on the Conservation of African-Eurasian Migratory Waterbirds (AEWA) applies.

== Identification ==
Size is one of the factors distinguishing a Siberian sand plover from a greater sand plover, with the Siberian being slightly smaller. However, it is not easy to rely on size alone especially when seen individually. The length of the bill is another distinguishing feature, with the Siberian generally having a shorter bill compared to a greater. The colour of the legs in a Siberian sand plover is generally darker, ranging from black to grey, while in a greater sand plover it is much paler, ranging from grey to yellowish.
