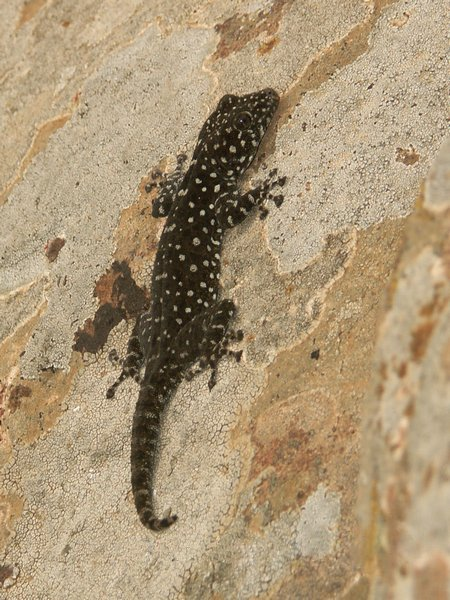
- Ptyodactylus puiseuxi

Scientific classification
- Kingdom: Animalia
- Phylum: Chordata
- Class: Reptilia
- Order: Squamata
- Suborder: Gekkota
- Family: Phyllodactylidae
- Genus: Ptyodactylus; Goldfuss, 1820

Species
- 12, see text.

= Ptyodactylus =

Genus of lizards

Ptyodactylus is a genus of geckos, which are commonly known as fan-fingered geckos. The genus has 12 described species.

== Geographic range and habitat ==
The genus Ptyodactylus is distributed across dry areas of Africa and the Middle East.

== Description ==
The common name, fan-fingered geckos, is derived from the pattern of the straight toes which are splayed out like the pattern of a snowflake. The pads on the ventral surface of the toes are adhesive, and each toe has a retractable claw.

== Species and subspecies ==
The following species and subspecies are recognized as being valid.

- Ptyodactylus ananjevae Nazarov, Melnikov & Melnikova, 2013
- Ptyodactylus dhofarensis Nazarov, Melnikov & Melnikova, 2013
- Ptyodactylus guttatus Heyden, 1827 – Sinai fan-fingered gecko
- Ptyodactylus hasselquistii (Donndorff, 1798) – yellow fan-fingered gecko
  - Ptyodactylus hasselquistii hasselquistii (Donndorff, 1798)
  - Ptyodactylus hasselquistii krameri Y. Werner, 1995 – Kramer's yellow fan-fingered gecko
- Ptyodactylus homolepis Blanford, 1876 – Pakistan fan-fingered gecko
- Ptyodactylus orlovi Nazarov, Melnikov & Melnikova, 2013
- Ptyodactylus oudrii Lataste, 1880 – Algerian fan-fingered gecko
- Ptyodactylus puiseuxi Boutan, 1893 – Israeli fan-fingered gecko
- Ptyodactylus ragazzii Anderson, 1898 – Ragazzi's fan-footed gecko
- Ptyodactylus rivapadiali Trape, 2017 – Riva and Padial's fan-footed gecko
- Ptyodactylus ruusaljibalicus Simó-Riudalbas, Metallinou, de Pous, Els, Jayasinghe, Péntek-Zakar, Wilms, Al-Saadi & Carranza, 2017 – Ruus al Jibal fan-footed gecko
- Ptyodactylus togoensis Tornier, 1901 – Togo fan-footed gecko
