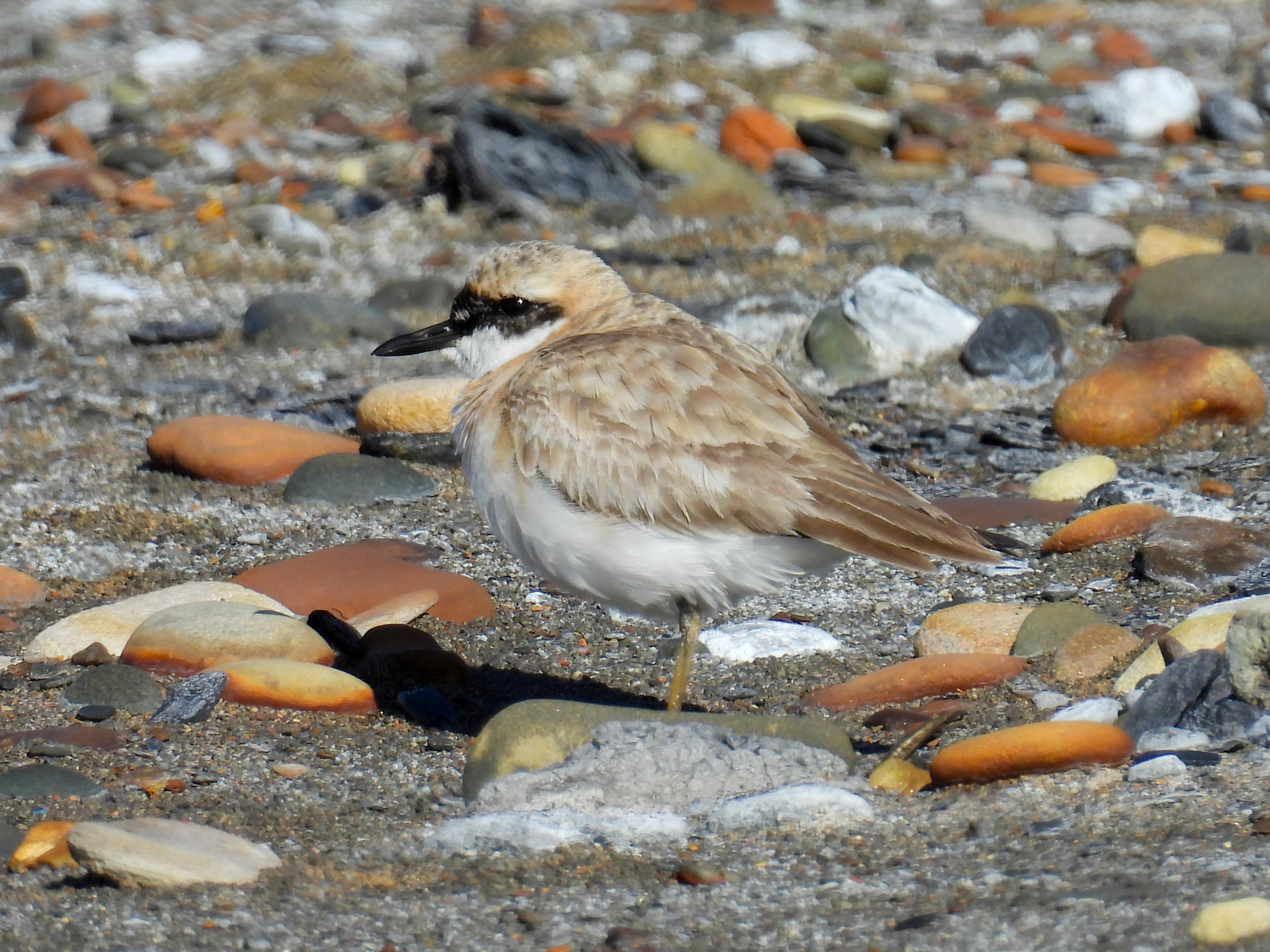
- A. l. leschenaultii breeding plumage; vagrant in Northumberland, UK
- A. l. columbinus non breeding plumage, Egypt

Conservation status
- Least Concern (IUCN 3.1)

Scientific classification
- Kingdom: Animalia
- Phylum: Chordata
- Class: Aves
- Order: Charadriiformes
- Family: Charadriidae
- Genus: Anarhynchus
- Species: A. leschenaultii

Binomial name
- Anarhynchus leschenaultii (Lesson, 1826)

Synonyms
- Charadrius leschenaultii (protonym)

= Greater sand plover =

Species of bird

The greater sand plover (Anarhynchus leschenaultii) is a small wader in the plover family of birds. The spelling is often given as "greater sandplover" or "greater sand-plover", but the official IOC and British Ornithologists' Union spelling is "Greater Sand Plover". The specific leschenaultii commemorates the French botanist Jean Baptiste Leschenault de la Tour. Like most other species in the genus Anarhynchus, it was until recently included in the genus Charadrius.

== Distribution ==
It breeds in the semi-deserts of Turkey and eastwards through Central Asia, where it nests in a bare ground scrape. This species is strongly migratory, wintering on sandy beaches in East Africa, South Asia and Australasia. It is a rare vagrant in western Europe, where it has been recorded as far west as Iceland. It has been recorded three times in North America, the most recent being on 13 April 2025 in Biscay Bay, Newfoundland and Labrador. Last previous sighing in NA,14 May 2009 in Jacksonville, Florida.

== Subspecies ==
There are three subspecies:

- A. l. leschenaultii, the nominate, in the east of the species' range in Mongolia and NW China. Bill intermediate; summer plumage with a weak orange breast band.
- A. l. scythicus, in the centre of the species' range in Central Asia. Bill largest in the species; summer plumage with a moderate orange breast band. Syn. A. l. crassirostris; this name is however preoccupied by a subspecies of Wilson's plover, A. wilsonia crassirostris described 48 years earlier.
- A. l. columbinus, in the west of the species' range in SW Asia west to central Turkey. Bill smallest in the species; summer plumage with a strong orange breast band.

== Description ==
This chunky plover is 19–22 cm long, slightly larger than a common ringed plover, and is conspicuously long-legged and thick-billed. Breeding males have sandy buff backs and white underparts. The breast, forehead and nape are variably orange in summer, and there is a black eye mask in summer. The female is duller and greyer, and winter and juvenile birds are browner, apart from a hint of rufous on the head. The legs are greenish-yellow and the bill black.

In all plumages, it is very similar to its close relatives Siberian sand plover A. mongolus and Tibetan sand plover A. atrifrons. Separating the species may be straightforward in mixed wintering flocks on an Indian beach, where the difference in size and structure is obvious; it is another thing altogether to identify a lone vagrant to western Europe, where both species are very rare. The problem is compounded in that the southwest Asian subspecies of the greater is the most similar to the other two species in its smaller bill.

== Ecology ==
Its food consists of insects, crustaceans and annelid worms, which are obtained by a run-and-pause technique, rather than the steady probing of some other wader groups.

Its flight call is a soft trill.

The greater sand plover is one of the species to which the Agreement on the Conservation of African-Eurasian Migratory Waterbirds (AEWA) applies.

== Gallery ==
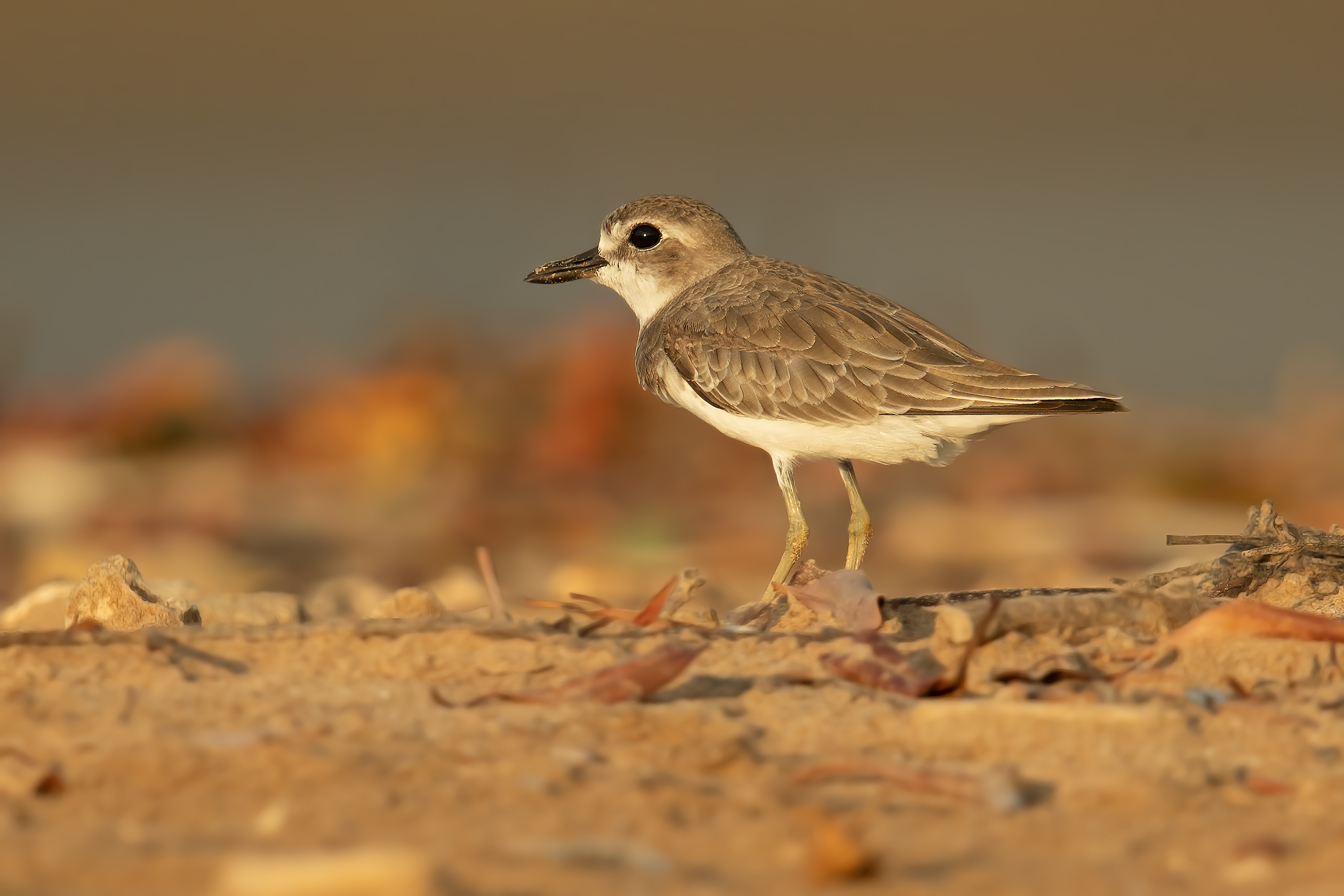
Winter plumage, Darwin, Northern Territory, Australia

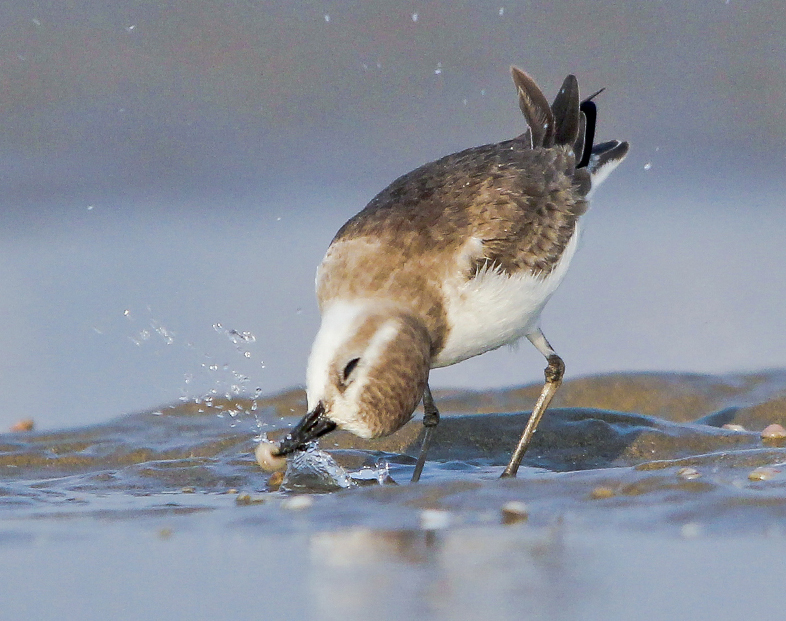
Feeding, at Kutch, India

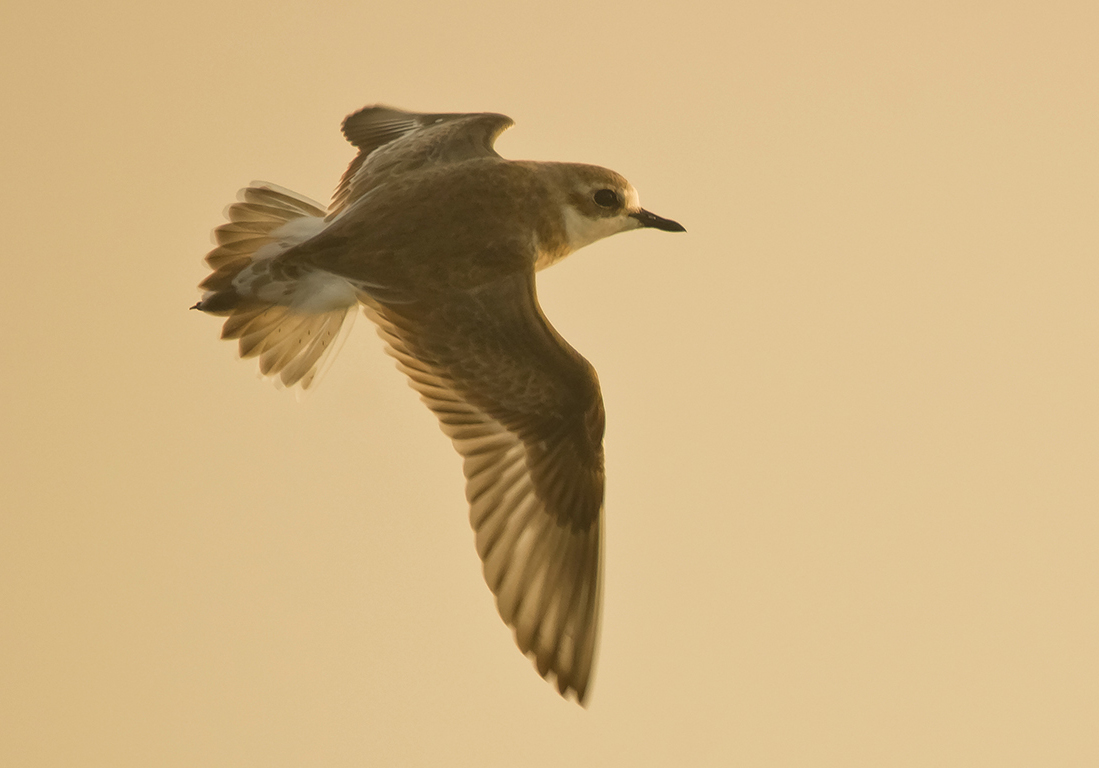
In flight; Kutch, India

Wynnum Esplanade, SE Queensland, Australia

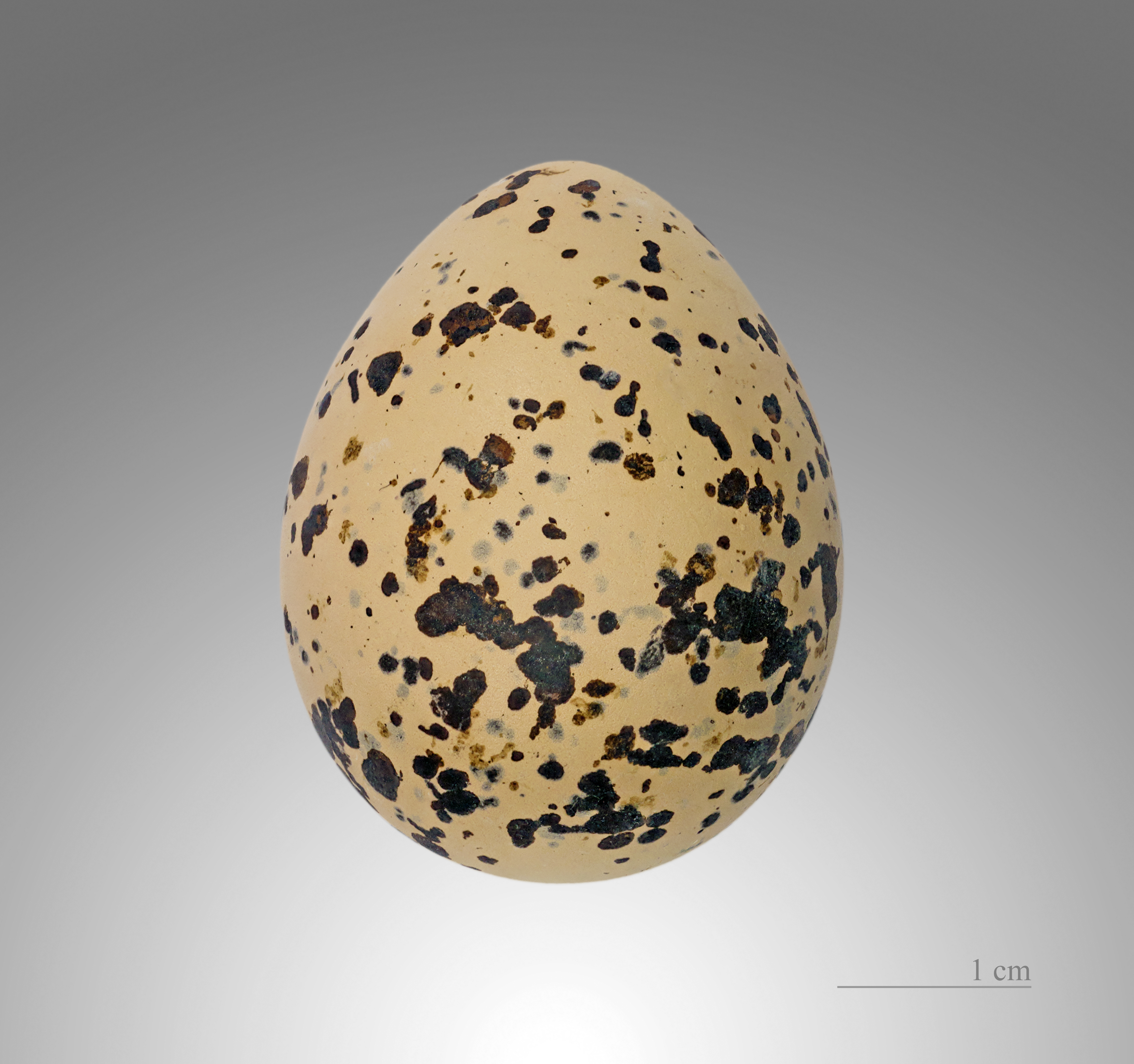
Egg - MHNT
