= Ptyodactylus orlovi =

Conservation status
- Least Concern (IUCN 3.1)

Scientific classification
- Kingdom: Animalia
- Phylum: Chordata
- Class: Reptilia
- Order: Squamata
- Suborder: Gekkota
- Family: Phyllodactylidae
- Genus: Ptyodactylus
- Species: P. orlovi

Binomial name
- Ptyodactylus orlovi Nazarov, Melnikov & Melnikova, 2013

Species of lizard

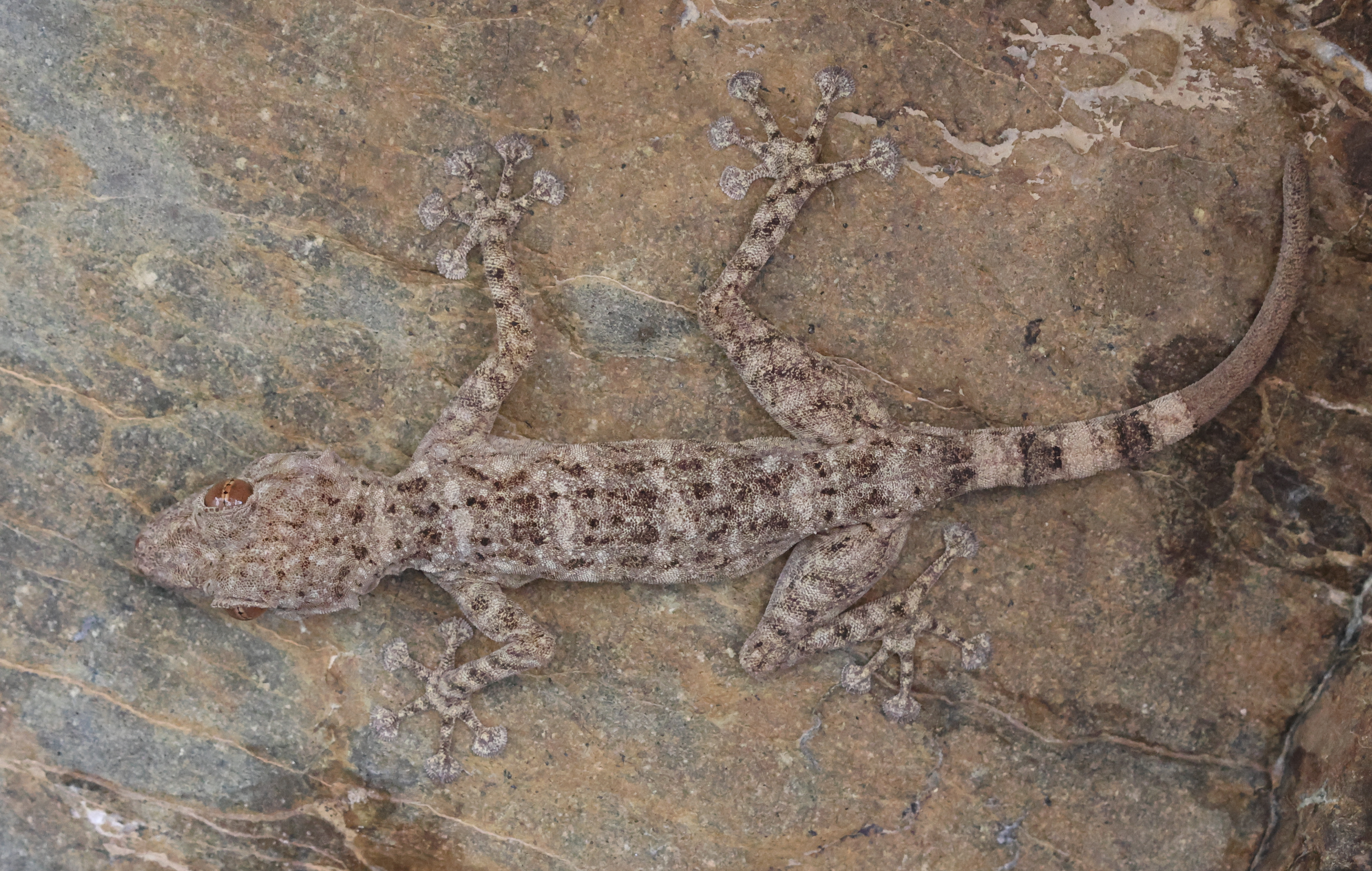
Ptyodactylus orlovi from the United Arab Emirates

Ptyodactylus orlovi, Orlov's Fan-footed Gecko, is a species of gecko in the family Phyllodactylidae. The species is native to the eastern Arabian Peninsula.

== Etymology ==
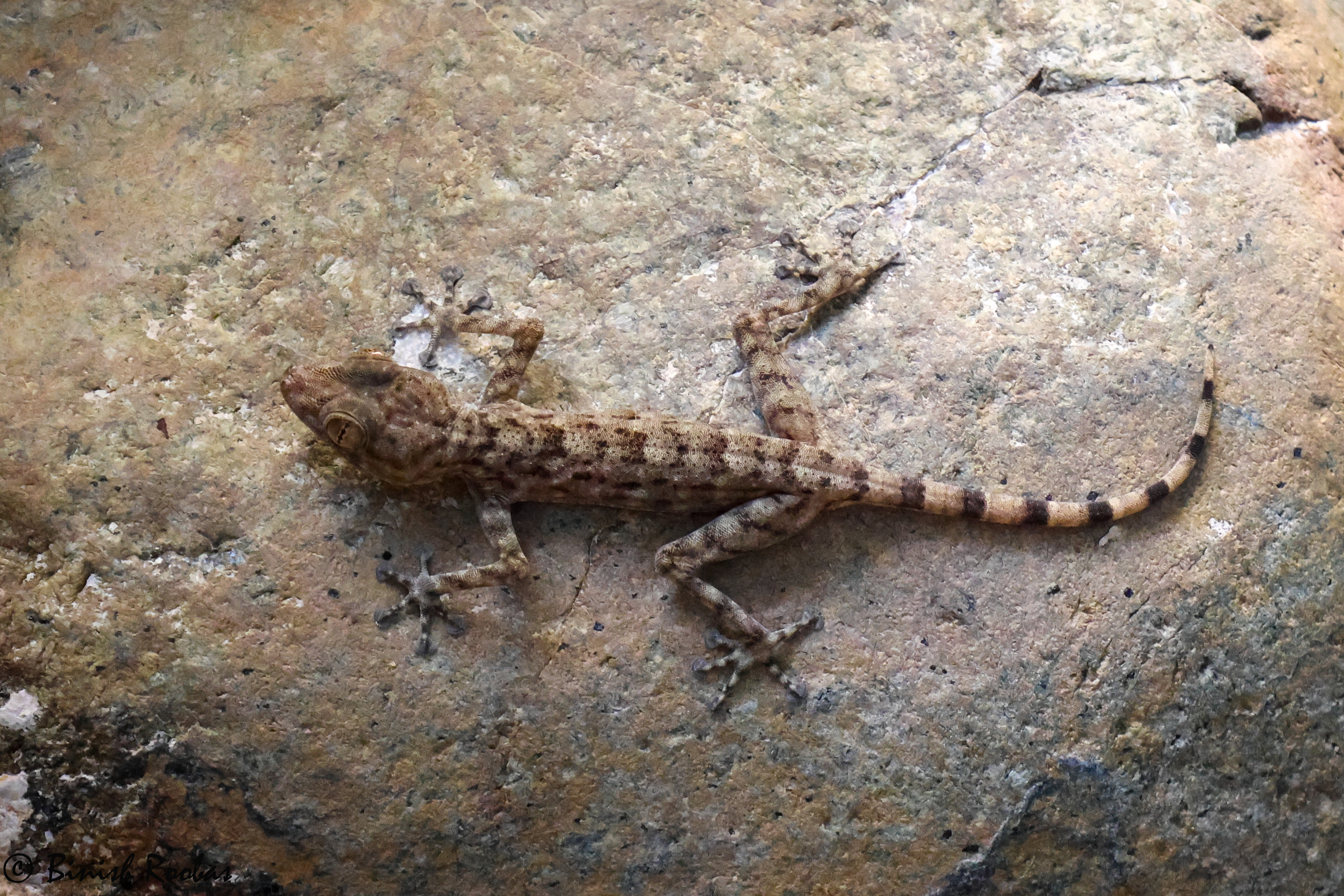
Ptyodactylus orlovi from Fujairah, United Arab Emirates

The specific name, orlovi, is in honor of Russian herpetologist Nikolai Orlov.

== Geographic distribution ==
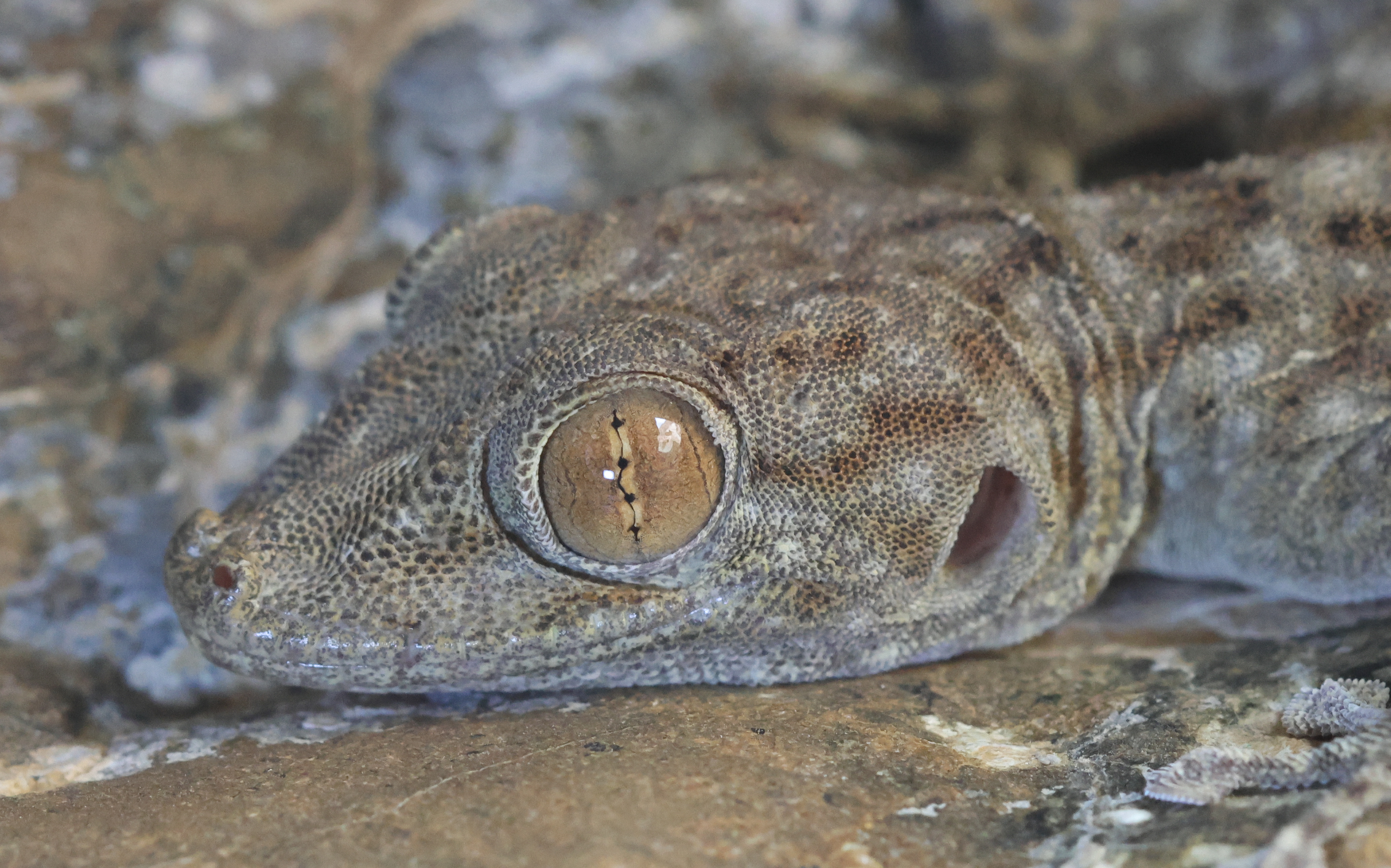
Head of Ptyodactylus orlovi

Ptyodactylus orlovi is found in Oman and the adjacent United Arab Emirates.

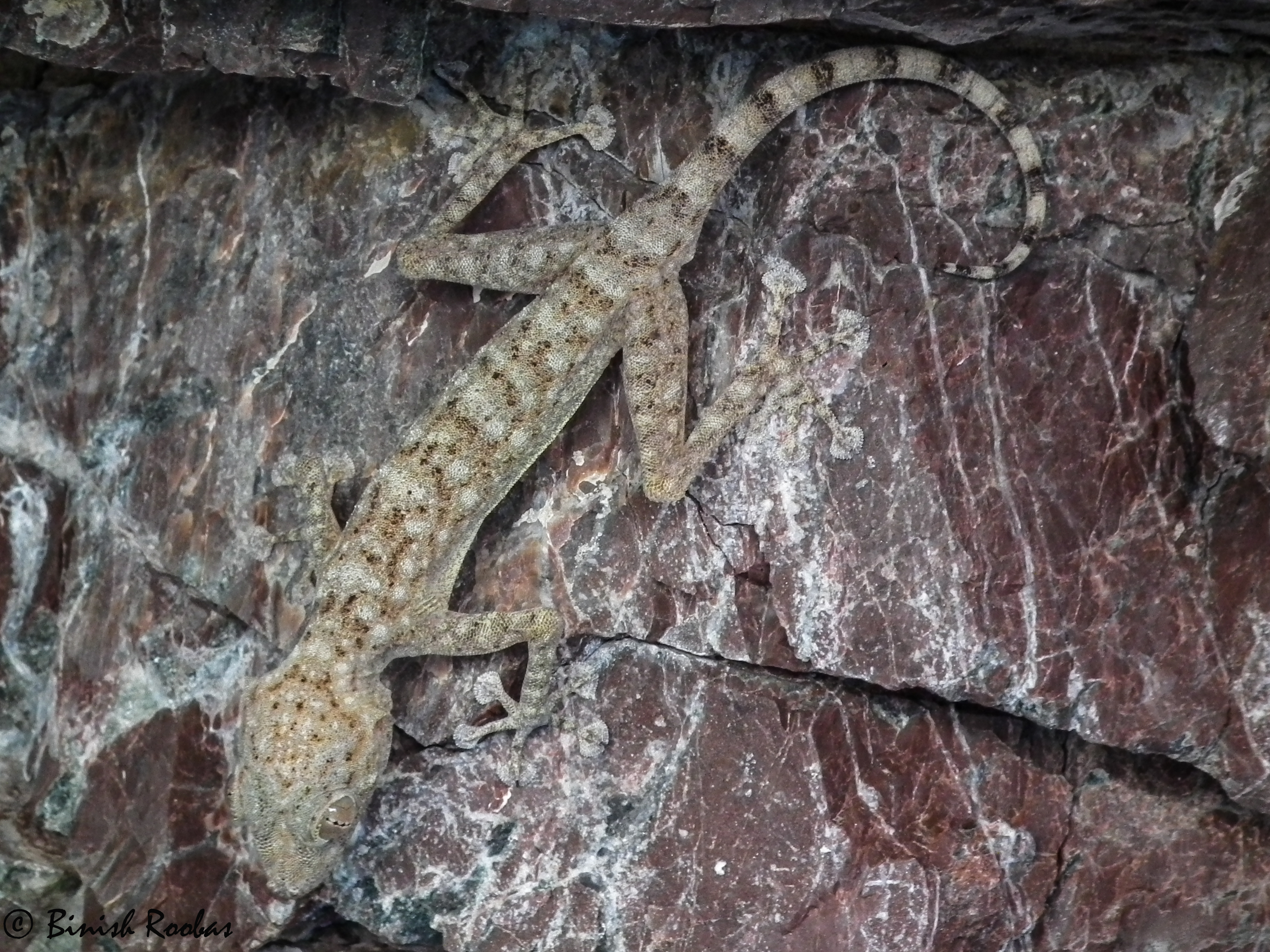
Ptyodactylus orlovi from Hatta, United Arab Emirates

== Habitat ==
The preferred natural habitat of Ptyodactylus orlovi is rocky areas of desert, at altitudes from sea level to 2,500 m (8,200 ft).

== Description ==
Ptyodactylus orlovi may attain a snout-to-vent length (SVL) of 8.4 cm (3.3 in), with a tail slightly shorter than SVL.

== Behavior ==
Ptyodactylus orlovi is diurnal, terrestrial, and rupicolous.

== Reproduction ==
Ptyodactylus orlovi is oviparous. In summer, an adult female may lay a clutch of two eggs in a communal nesting site.
