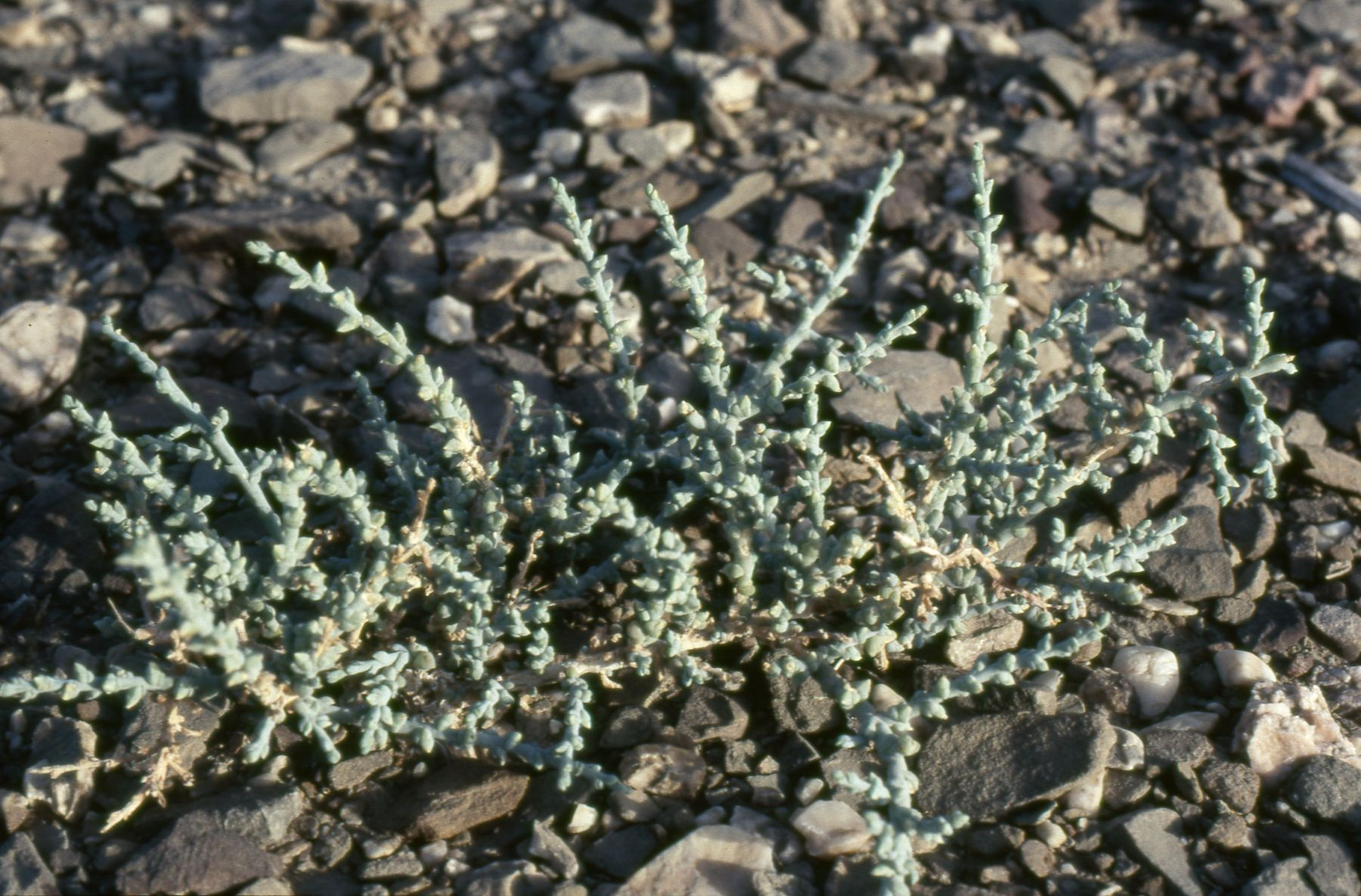

Scientific classification
- Kingdom: Plantae
- Clade: Tracheophytes
- Clade: Angiosperms
- Clade: Eudicots
- Order: Caryophyllales
- Family: Amaranthaceae
- Genus: Halothamnus
- Species: H. iranicus

Binomial name
- Halothamnus iranicus Botsch.

= Halothamnus iranicus =

Species of plant

Halothamnus iranicus is a species of the plant genus Halothamnus that belongs to the subfamily Salsoloideae of the family Amaranthaceae (formerly Chenopodiaceae). It occurs in Southwest Asia.

== Morphology ==
Halothamnus iranicus is a sub-shrub up to 45 cm high and 100 cm in diameter, with blueish-green branches. It smells unpleasantly like rancid butter. The leaves are linear to triangular-ovate, and up to 11 mm long. The flowers are at 1–6 mm distance from each other, 3.2-4.2 mm long, longer than their bract and bracteoles, with oblong-ovate tepals. The stigmas are tapering towards the apex. The winged fruit is 7–11 mm in diameter, their wings inserting at 1/3 of the fruit height. The fruit tube is nearly cylindrical, with narrow, sharp-edged peripheral rim and small, ovate pits.

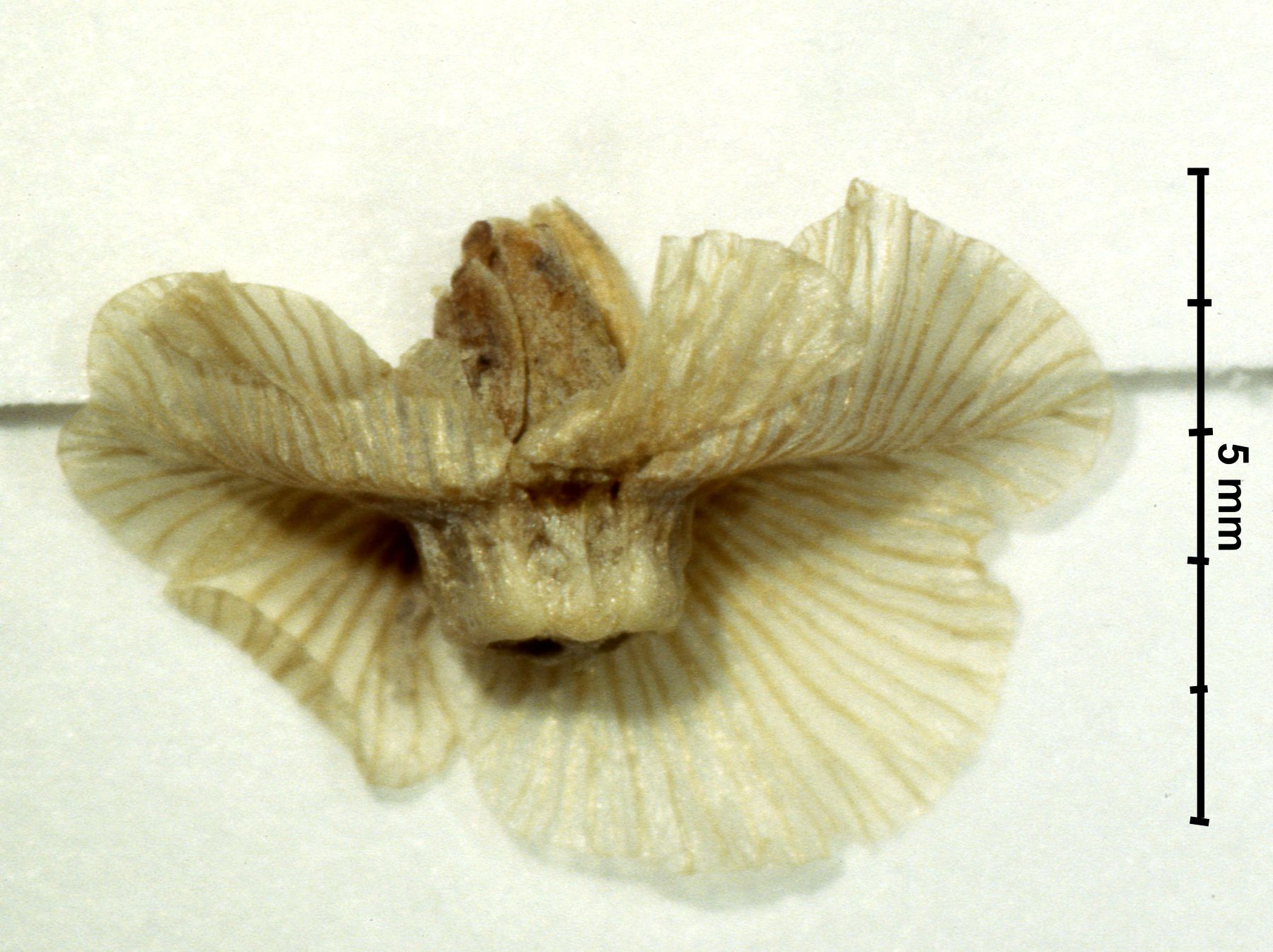
fruit (lateral view)

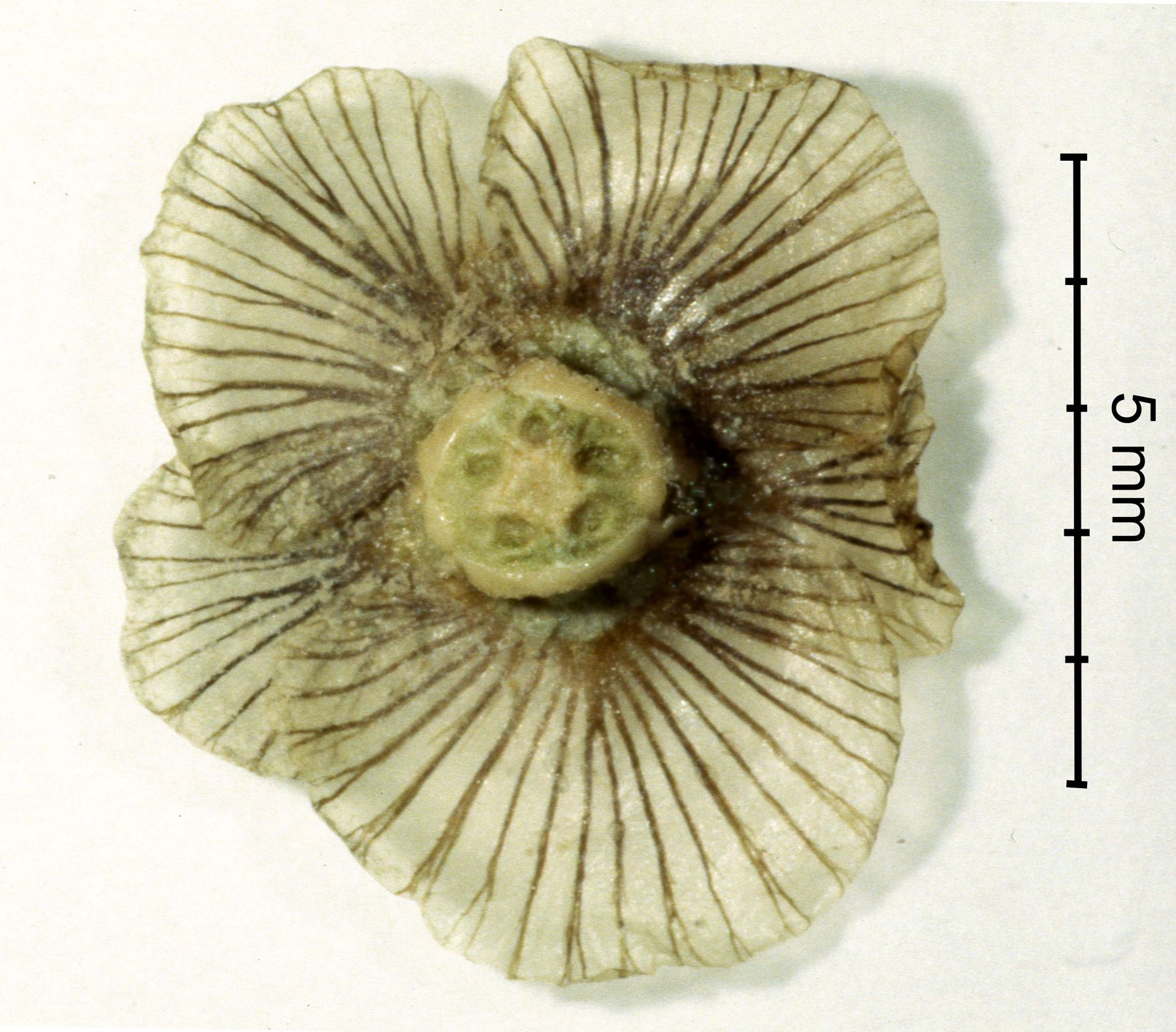
fruit (bottom)

== Taxonomy ==
Halothamnus iranicus has been first described in 1981 by Victor Petrovič Botschantzev (in: Bot. Mater. Gerb. Bot. Inst. Komarova Akad. Nauk SSSR 18, p. 153). Within the genus, it belongs to the section Halothamnus.

== Distribution ==
Halothamnus iranicus is endemic in southern Iran and in southwest Pakistan (Baluchistan). It grows in habitats with a mild winter climate, on rocky, stony, partly salty soils, from 0–930 m above sea level.
