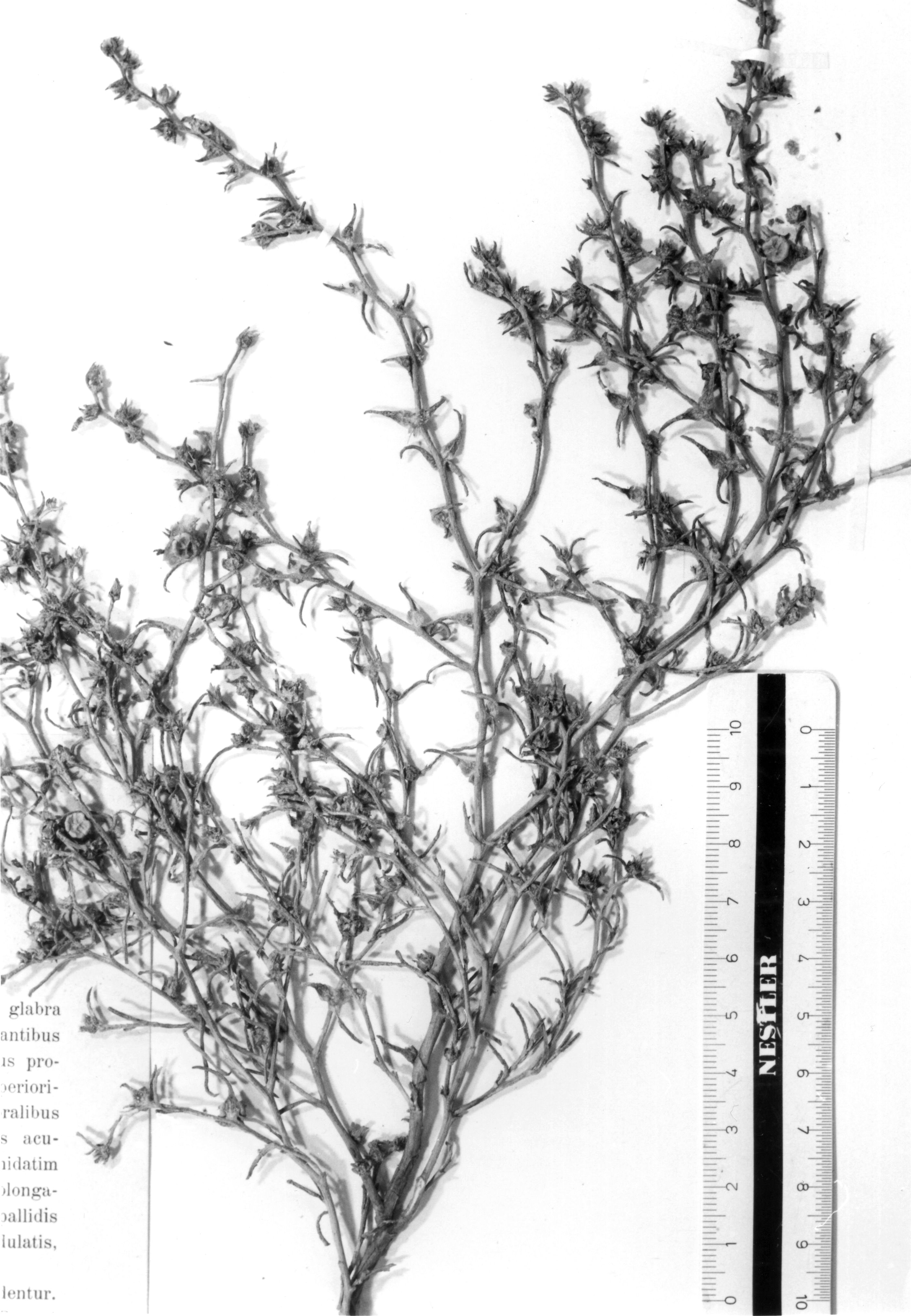

Scientific classification
- Kingdom: Plantae
- Clade: Tracheophytes
- Clade: Angiosperms
- Clade: Eudicots
- Order: Caryophyllales
- Family: Amaranthaceae
- Genus: Halothamnus
- Species: H. iliensis

Binomial name
- Halothamnus iliensis (Lipsky) Botsch.

Synonyms
- Salsola iliensis Lipsky; Aellenia iliensis (Lipsky) Aellen

= Halothamnus iliensis =

Species of flowering plant

Halothamnus iliensis is a species of the plant genus Halothamnus, that belongs to the subfamily Salsoloideae of the family Amaranthaceae, (formerly Chenopodiaceae). It occurs in Central Asia.

== Morphology ==
Halothamnus iliensis is an annual plant with blueish-green, pale striped branches. The half-terete leaves are linear, and up to 50 mm long. The flowers are 3,8-4,6 mm long, shorter than their bract and bracteoles, with lanceolate tepals, their membranous margins at the apex distinctly wider than laterally. The stigmas have a widened, rounded, denticulate-fringed apex. The winged fruit is 10–15 mm in diameter, the tepal lobes with thick, spongy keels, forming a flat five radiated cone. The fruit tube has concave sides with sharply prominent ridges (veins). At its bottom, a wide, sharp-edged prominent peripheral rim surrounds the large ovate pits.

In the lower parts of the plants, the fruits are heavier with shorter wings, in the upper part fruits are lighter with larger wings (heterocarpy)

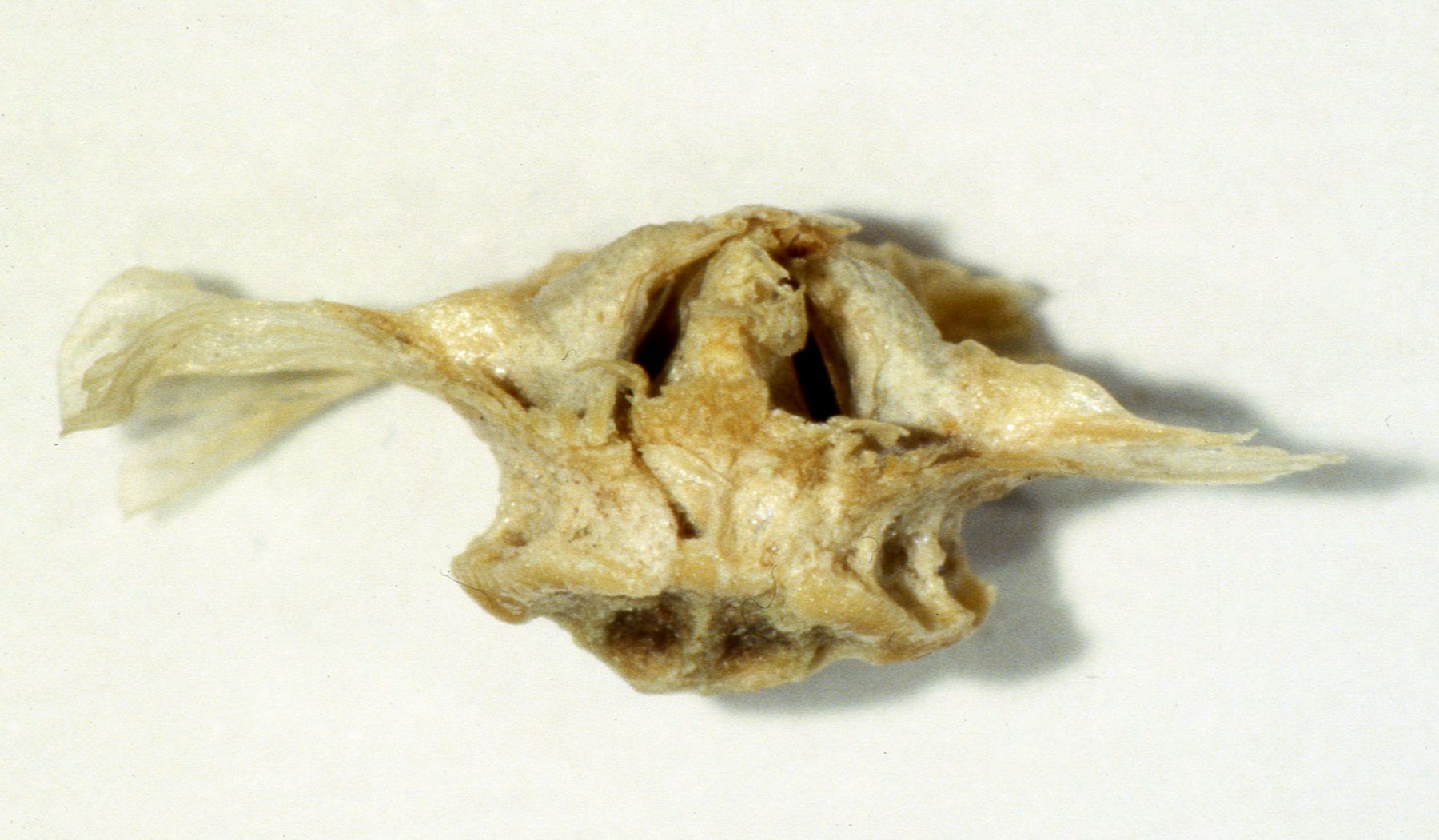
fruit (lateral view)

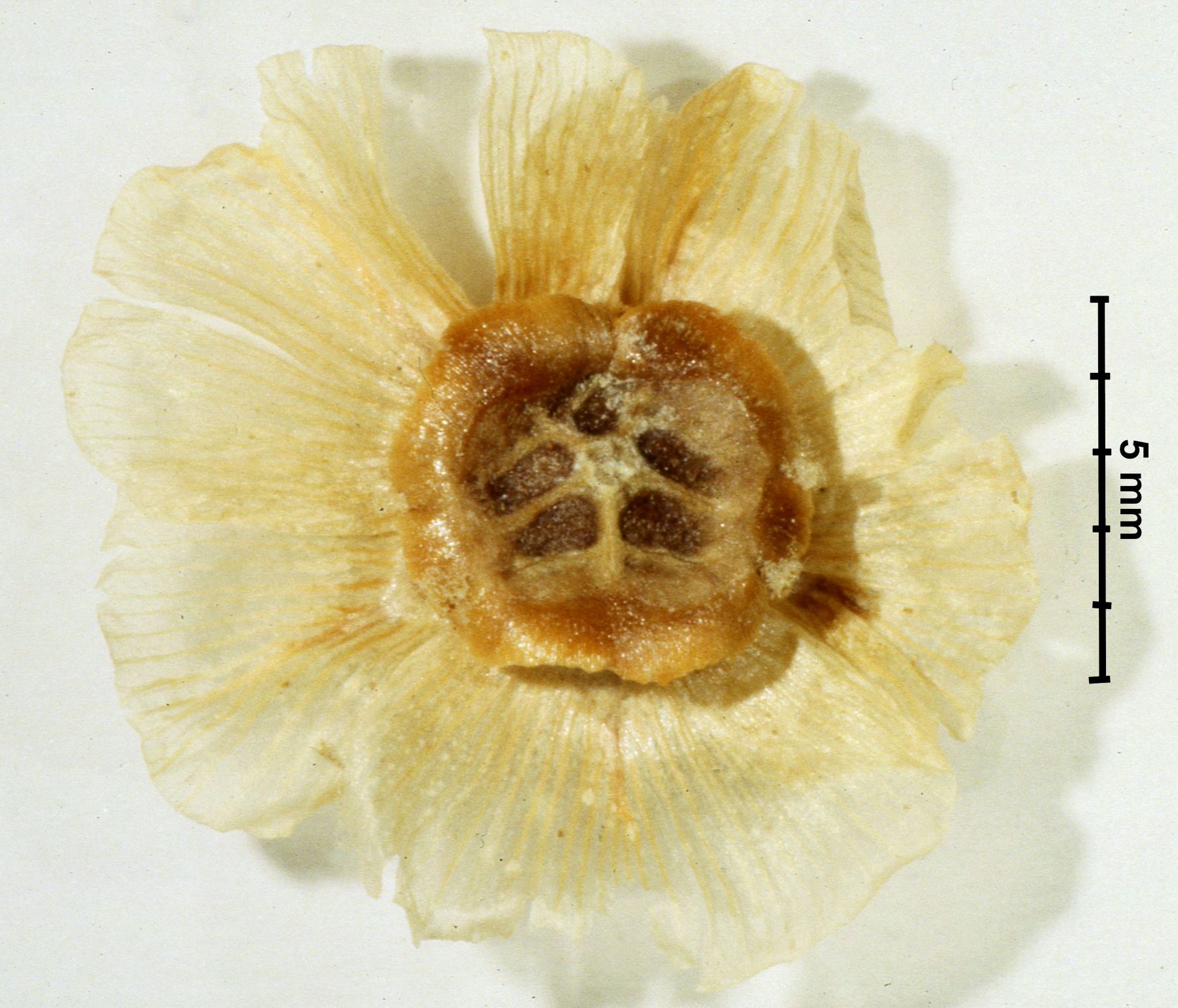
fruit (bottom)

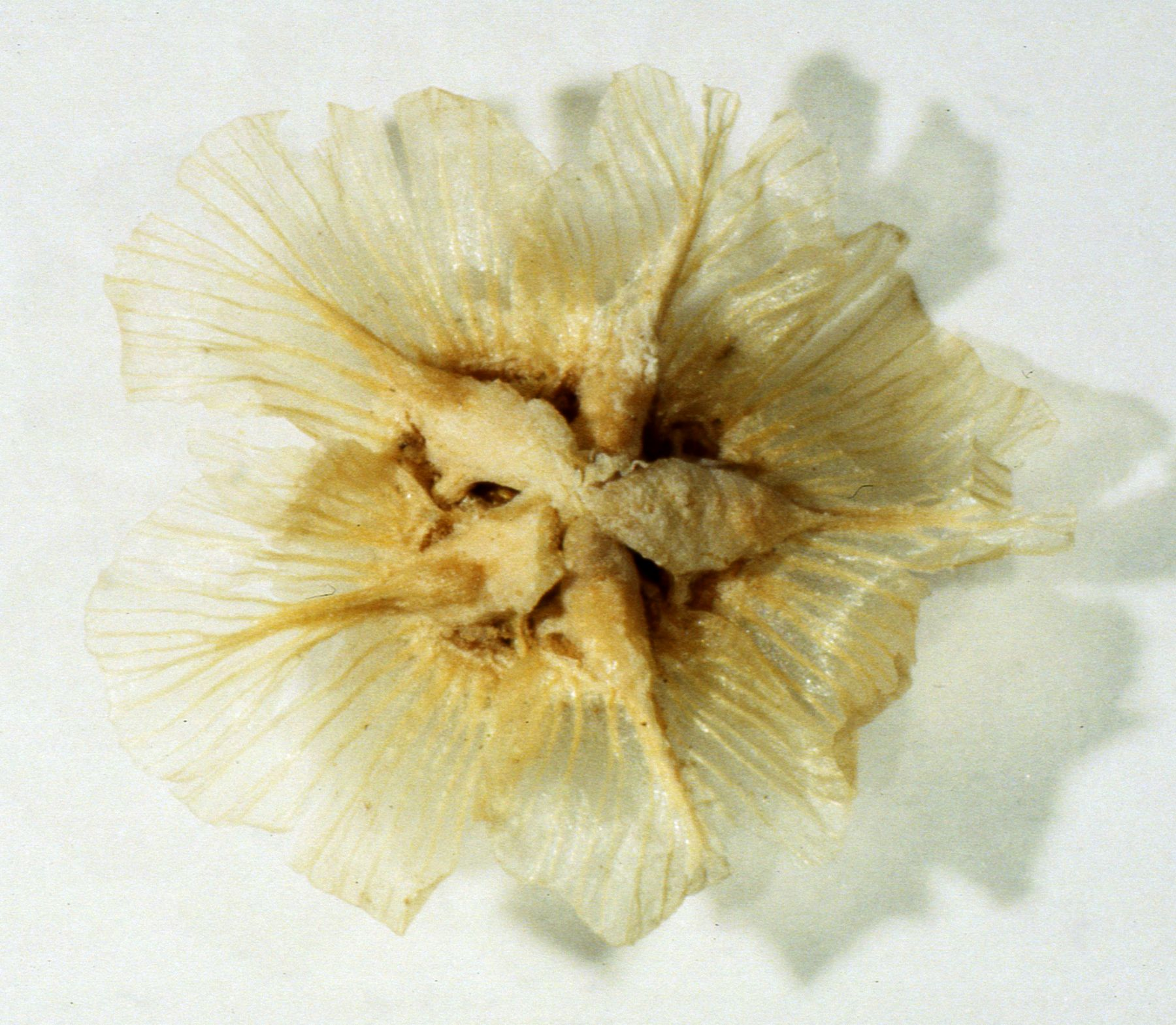
fruit (top)

== Taxonomy ==
The species has been first described in 1912 as Salsola iliensis by Vladimir Ippolitovich Lipsky (In: B. Fedčenko: Trudy Imperatorskago S.-Peterburgskago Botaniceskago Sada. Acta Horti Petropolitani. St. Petersburg, Vol. 32, 1, p. 6). The species name refers to the location of the type specimen near the Ili River. In 1981, Victor Petrovič Botschantzev included the species into the genus Halothamnus (In: Bot. Mater. Gerb. Bot. Inst. Komarova Akad. Nauk SSSR 18: p. 156). Within the genus, it belongs to the section Halothamnus.

== Distribution ==
The distribution area of Halothamnus iliensis extends from Kazakhstan, Turkmenistan, Uzbekistan, northern Afghanistan to Tajikistan and Kirghistan. It grows in semideserts on sandy, clayey, or stony, often saline soils, up to 850 m above sea level.
