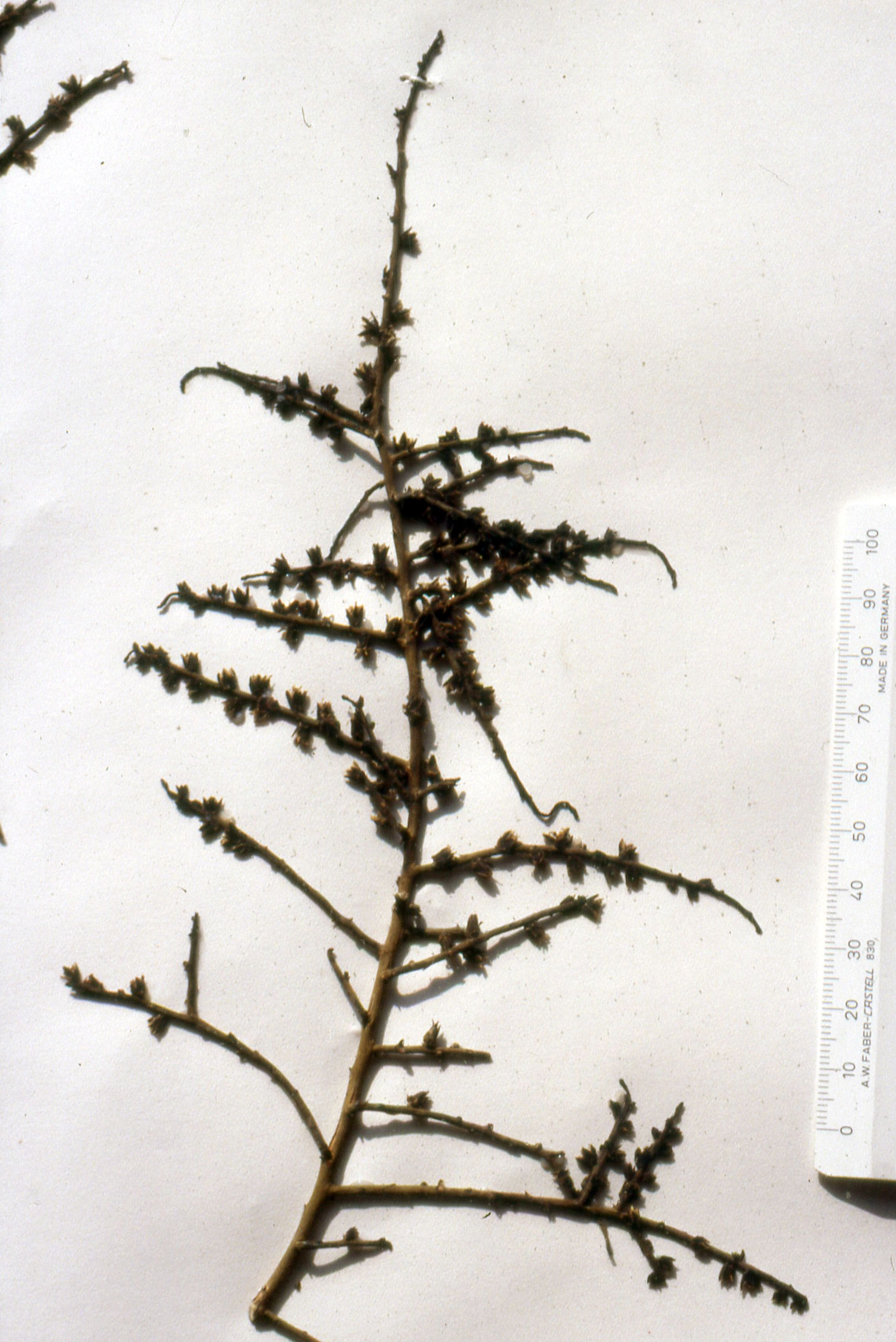

Scientific classification
- Kingdom: Plantae
- Clade: Tracheophytes
- Clade: Angiosperms
- Clade: Eudicots
- Order: Caryophyllales
- Family: Amaranthaceae
- Genus: Halothamnus
- Species: H. somalensis

Binomial name
- Halothamnus somalensis (N.E.Br.) Botsch.

Synonyms
- Salsola somalensis N.E.Br.; Salsola bottae (Jaub. & Spach) Boiss. var. faurotii Franchet; Salsola bottae (Jaub. & Spach) Boiss. var. farinulenta Chiov.

= Halothamnus somalensis =

Species of flowering plant

Halothamnus somalensis is a species of the plant genus Halothamnus, that is now included into the family Amaranthaceae, (formerly Chenopodiaceae). It is endemic to the Horn of Africa (Djibouti, Somalia, and Ethiopia) and is used for traditional medicine.

== Description ==
Halothamnus somalensis is a thorny shrub 30–90 cm high, with olive-green branches, that partly turn black when drying. The semiterete, tiny leaves are appressed to the branches, and only 0,5–3 mm long. The flowers are 3,0-4,7 mm long. The winged fruit is 8-12,5 mm in diameter, their wings never turning black even on blackened plants. The bottom of the fruit tube has very small linear grooves located near the periphery, lacking any prominent radial veins.

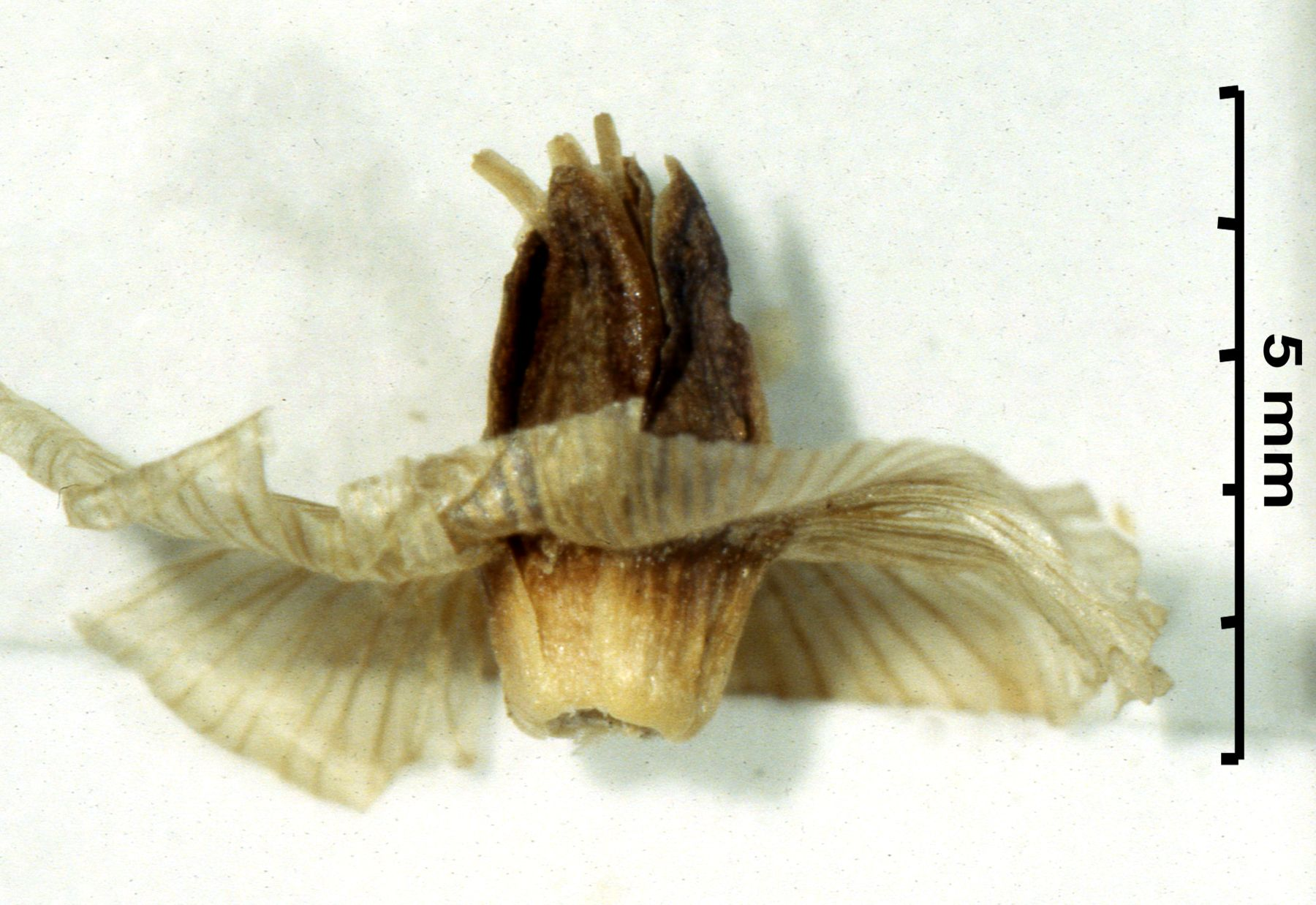
fruit (lateral view)

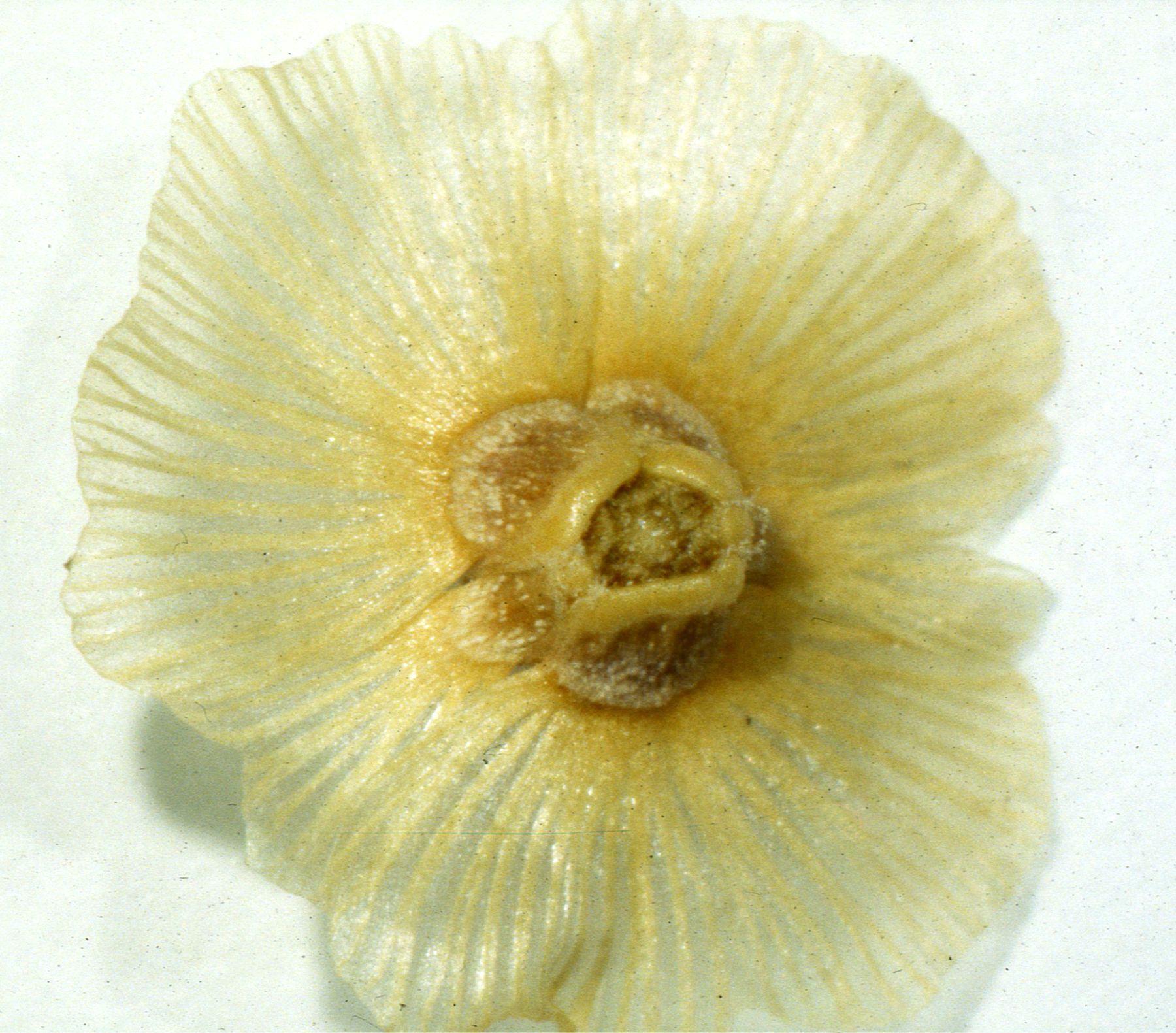
fruit (bottom)

=== Anatomy ===
Halothamnus somalensis has epidermis walls with an outer cutinized layer in addition to the cuticle itself. It is the only species of the genus that shows this anatomical feature.

== Taxonomy ==
The species has been first described in 1909 by Nicholas Edward Brown as Salsola somalensis (In: Bull. Misc. Inform. 2, 1909, p. 50). In 1981, Victor Petrovič Botschantzev included it into the genus Halothamnus. The species has sometimes been misidentified as Halothamnus bottae, occurring on the Arabian peninsula.

== Distribution ==
Halothamnus somalensis is endemic in Djibouti, Somalia and dry areas of Ethiopia. Similar plants from the Arabian Peninsula belong to Halothamnus bottae ssp. niger. It grows in open thorny savanna on sandy, clayey or rocky ground, from 0–1750 m above sea level.

== Uses ==
The roots of Halothamnus somalensis are traditionally used as a medicine plant against parasitic worm diseases in animals or humans.

=== Vernacular names ===
In Somalia, the species is known as "gosomadowbeye" ("gowsa-madobeyi", "goso-mudo-weyi", "gusomadobeye", "gosama do beya") This name derives from the Somalian words goso (= molar teeth) and madow (= black), referring to the fact, that the teeth and lips are stained black when the plant is eaten. Other commons names are "afmadobeye", "dankup", "mirrow", "mimou", or "mirgi-edalis". In Djibouti, the species is called "Yagali".
