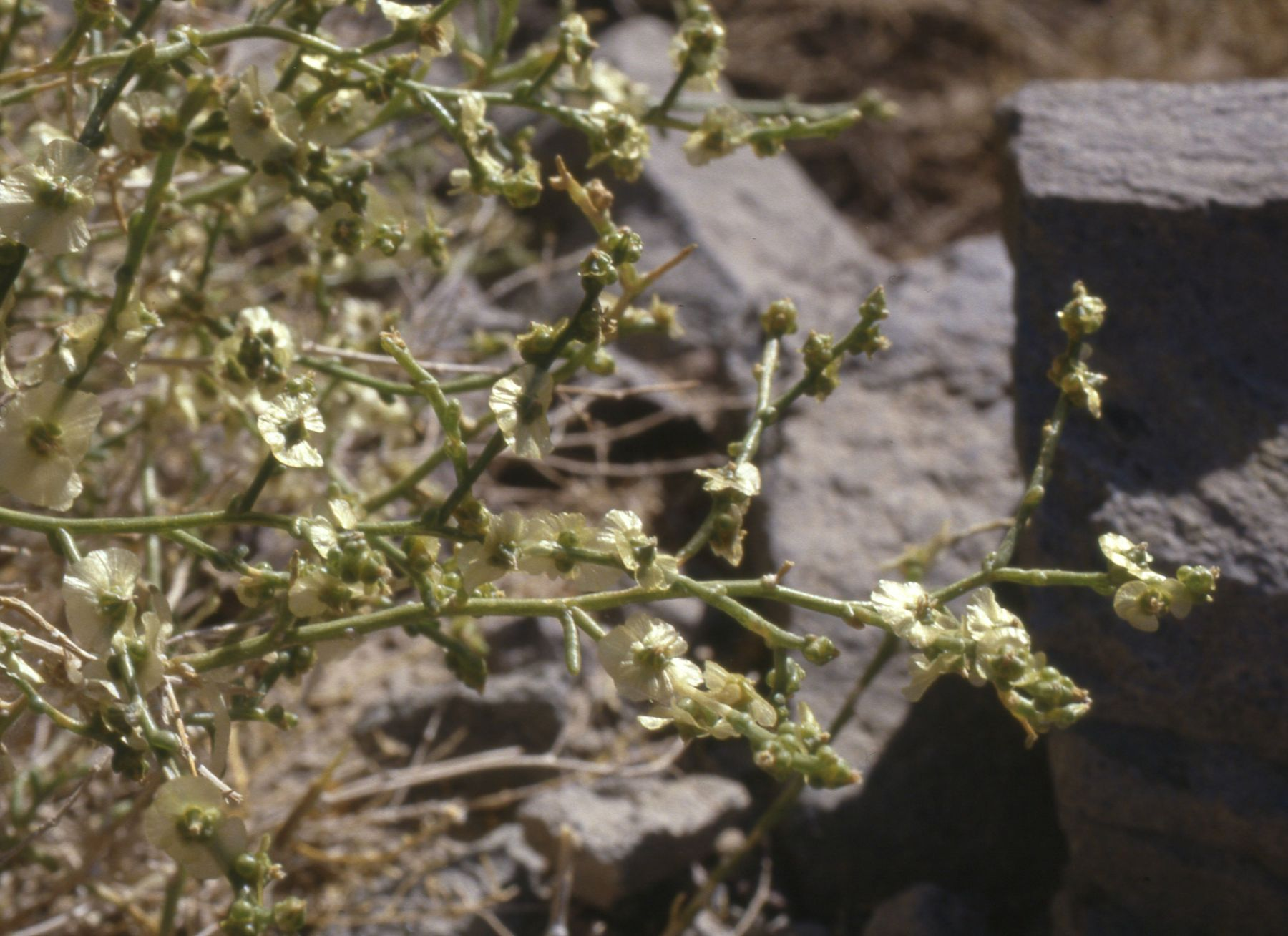
- Halothamnus subaphyllus subsp. charifii

Scientific classification
- Kingdom: Plantae
- Clade: Tracheophytes
- Clade: Angiosperms
- Clade: Eudicots
- Order: Caryophyllales
- Family: Amaranthaceae
- Subfamily: Salsoloideae
- Tribe: Salsoleae
- Genus: Halothamnus; Jaub. & Spach

Species
- 21 species, see text

Synonyms
- Aellenia (Ulbr.) emend. Aellen (circumscription emended); Salsola L. sect. Sphragidanthus Iljin

= Halothamnus =

Genus of flowering plants

Halothamnus is a genus in the subfamily Salsoloideae of the family Amaranthaceae (s.l., now including Chenopodiaceae). The scientific name means "saltbush", from the Greek ἅλς (hals) 'salt' and θαμνος (thamnos) 'bush'. This refers either to salty habitats or to the accumulation of salt in the plants. The genus is distributed from Southwest and Central Asia to the Arabian Peninsula and East Africa.

== Description ==
Most species of Halothamnus are small shrubs or sub-shrubs, two species are annuals. The alternate leaves are sitting without basal narrowing at the branches. They are simple, entire, half-terete or flat and slightly fleshy (succulent).

The bisexual inconspicuous flowers are sitting solitary in the axil of a green bract and two green bracteoles. The five free tepals are green with membranous margins above a transverse line and colourless below. Five stamens arise from a cup-like structure (hypogynous disc) at the base of the flower. One ovary is formed by two carpels, with a thick pistil, and two stigmas.

The one-seeded, horizontally flattened fruit keeps being enclosed by the hardening perianth. Wings develop from the transverse zone at the outer side of the tepals. Below the wings, the perianth forms a thick and lignified tube with a widened base. Its bottom side has five pits arranged in a ring, surrounded by a rim. These fruit characteristics are essential for the genus Halothamnus.

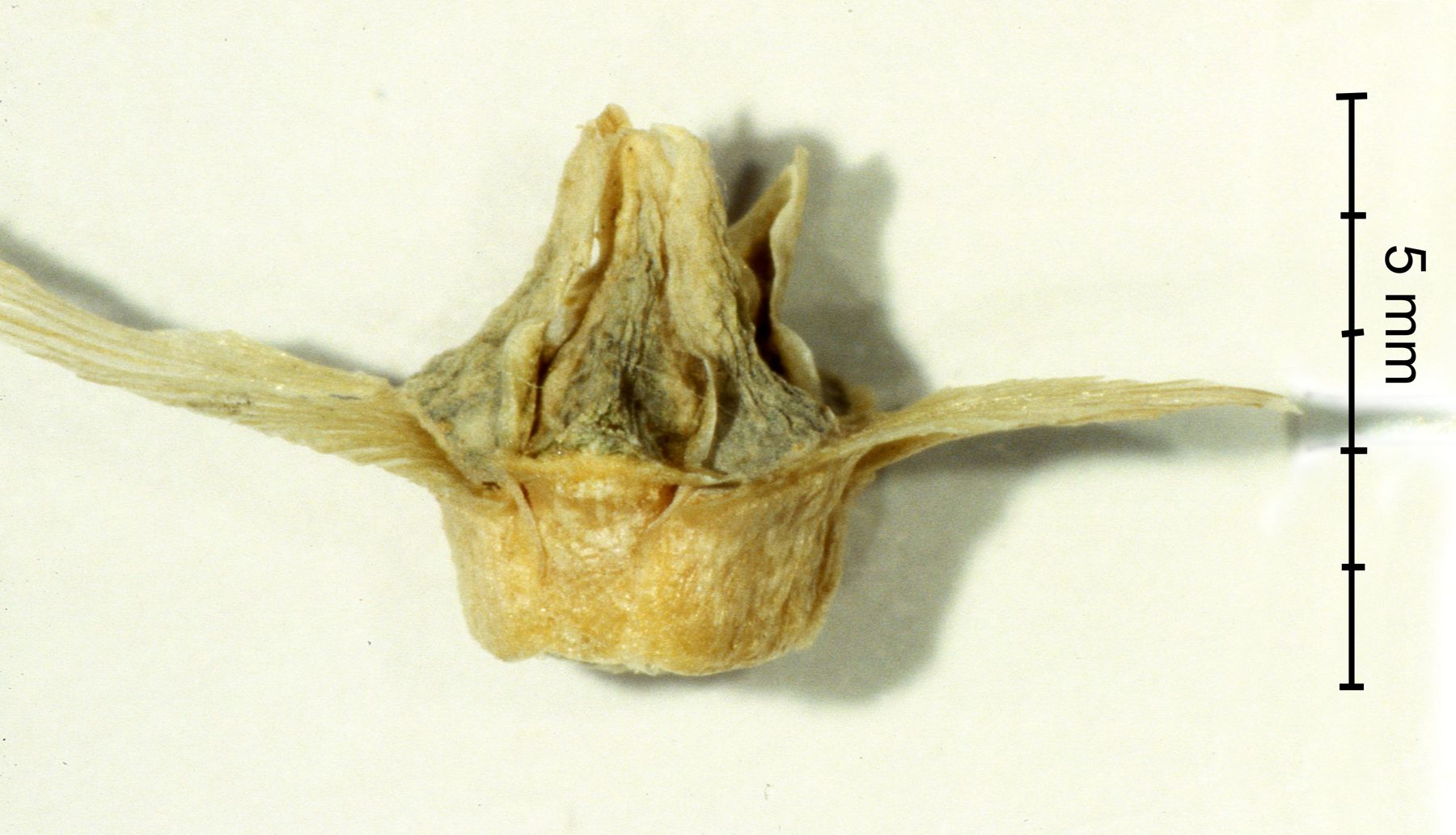
Fruit (lateral view) of Halothamnus lancifolius

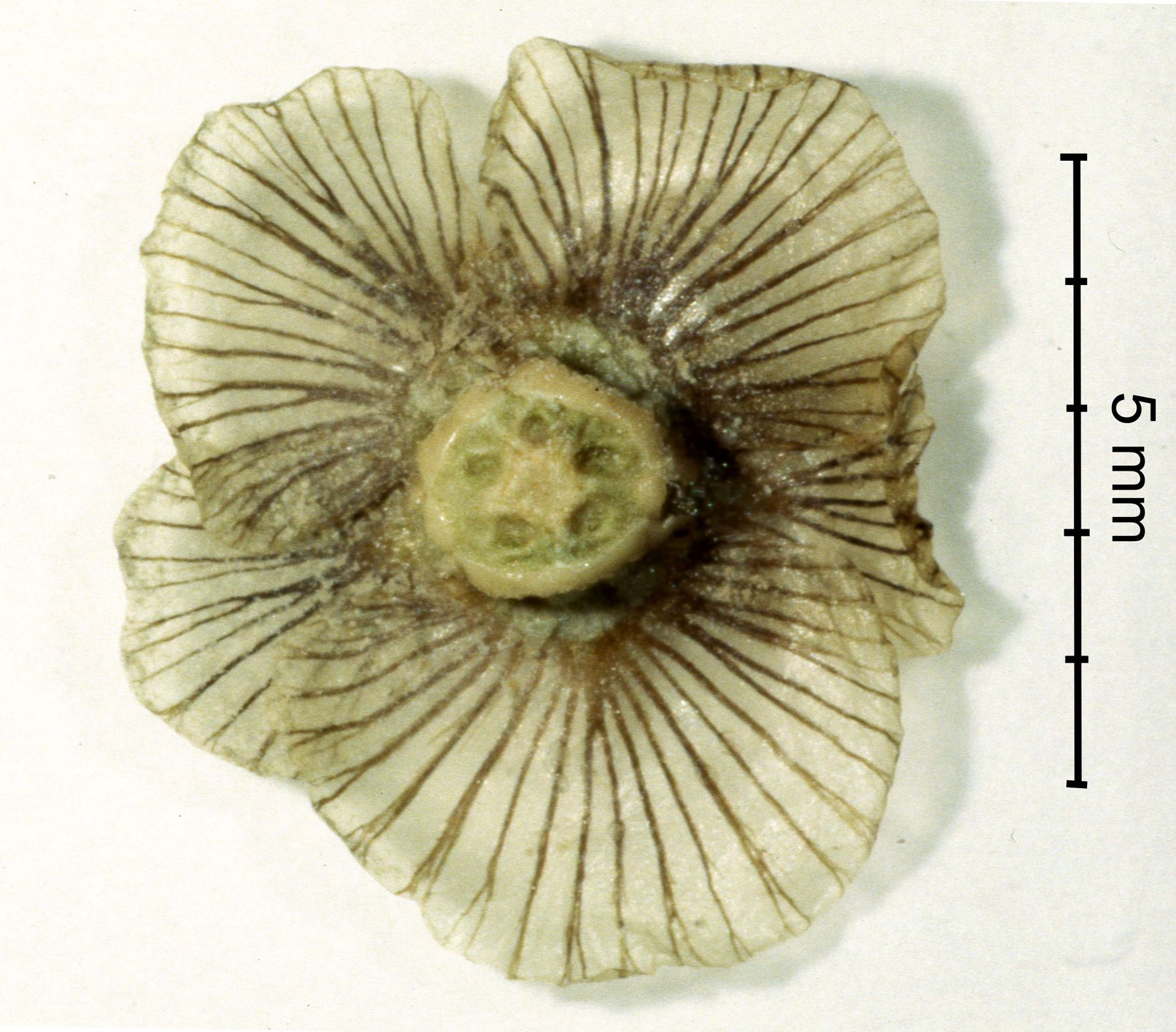
Fruit (bottom) of Halothamnus iranicus

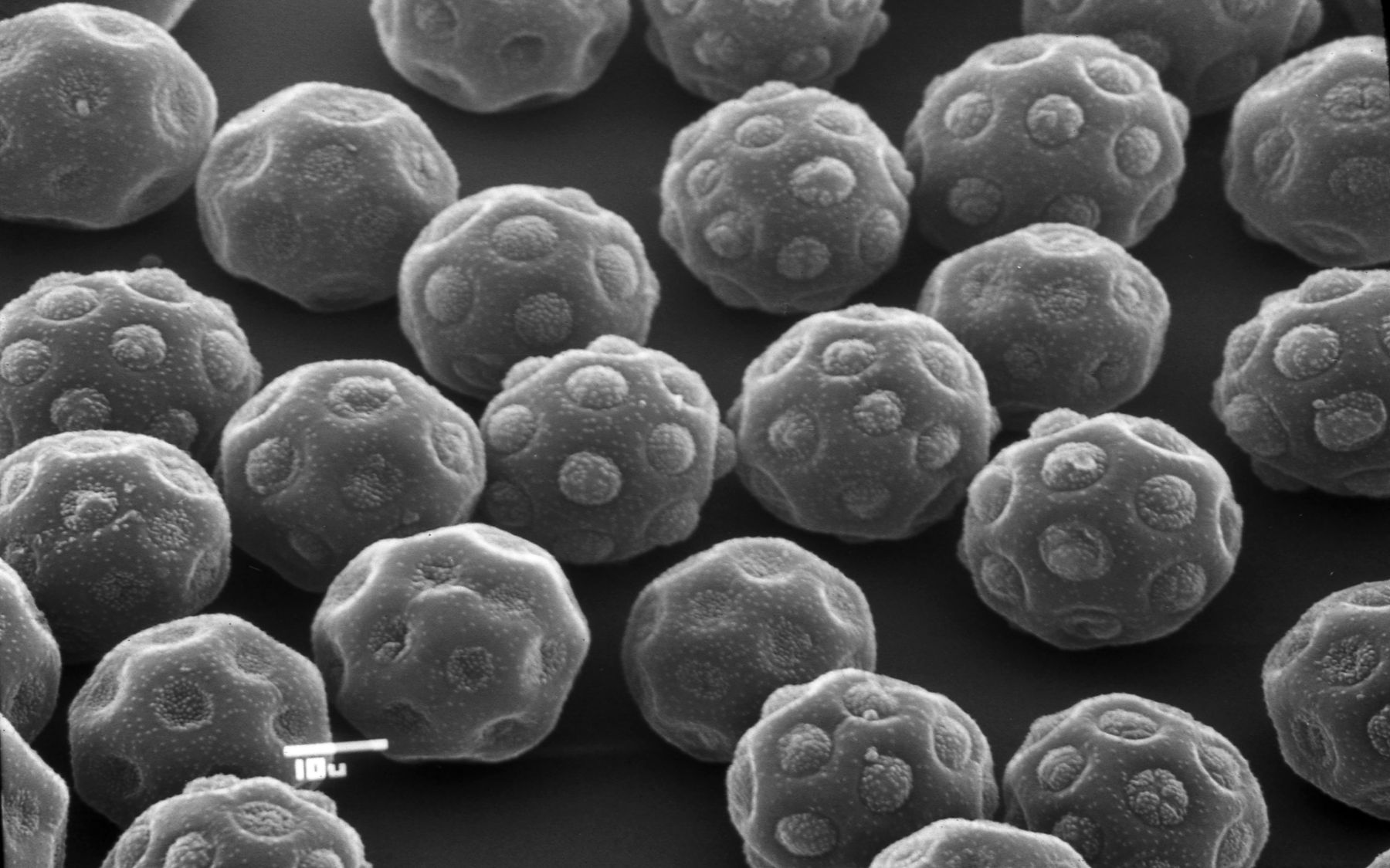
Pollen of Halothamnus glaucus ssp. tianschanicus

The pollen grains are nearly ball-shaped, 18-38 μm in diameter, with 12-29 pores scattered all over the surface (pantoporate), just like it is typically for the goosefoot-family. The species differ from each other in pollen diameter and number of pores, the southern species with the smallest and the northern species with the largest pollen grains.

== Pollination and dissemination ==
In all species the stamens blossom first, and the stigmas unfold later (protandry). Halothamnus subaphyllus was proved to be pollinated by insects (entomophily). There are no observations for the other species, but they are considered to be pollinated by insects, too.

The fruits enclosed by the hardened perianth are dispersed by the wind (anemochory), lifted up by their wings up to 20 mm in diameter.

== Distribution ==
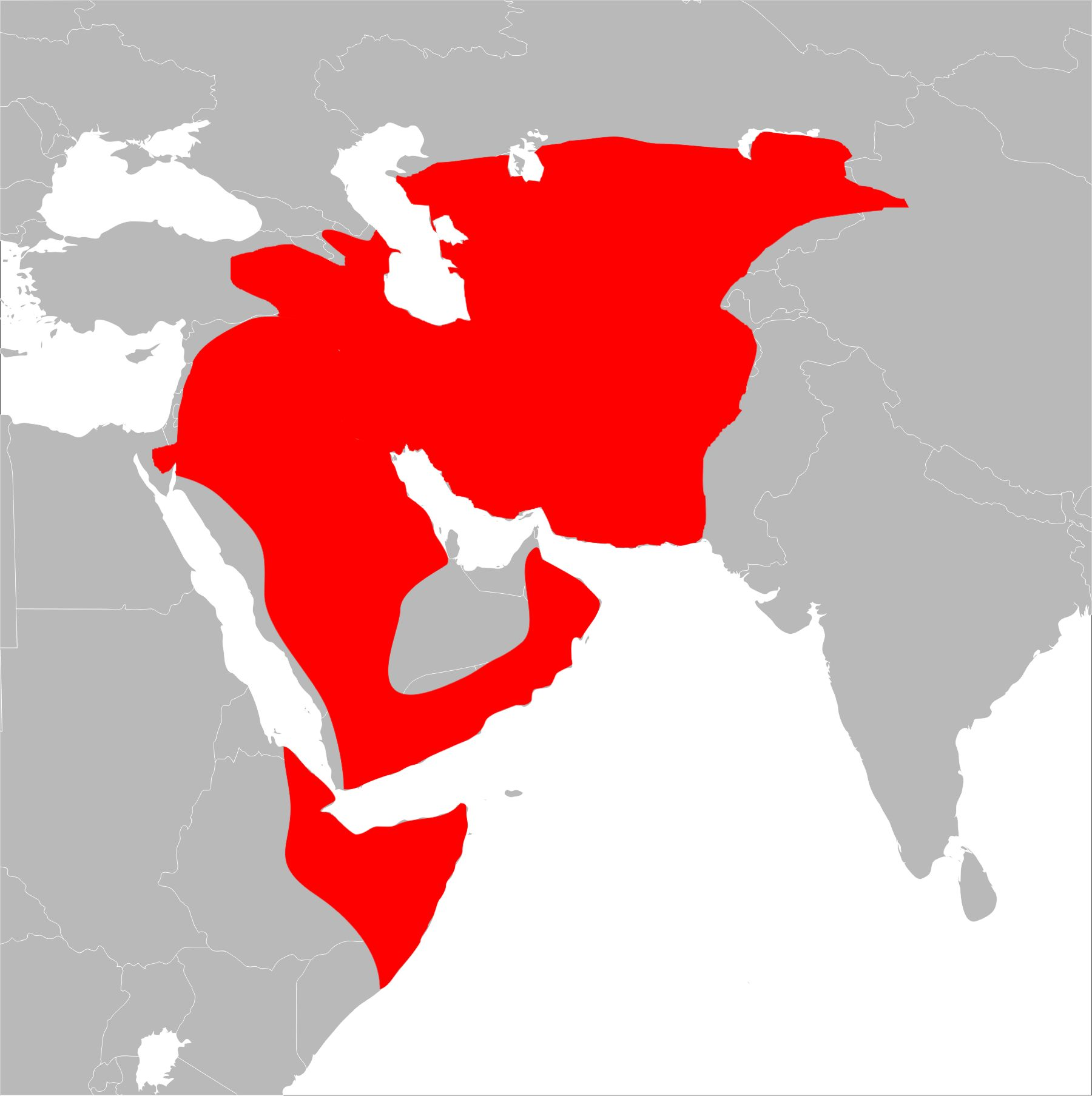
Distribution area of the genus Halothamnus

The distribution of the genus extends from the Caucasus Mountains and Kazakhstan through Central Asia, Southwest Asia southward to Somalia. The westernmost localities are at the Sinai Peninsula, the easternmost in Dzungaria in China. Most species occur in Iran, Afghanistan, and southern Central Asia. All species grow in dry habitats of deserts and semideserts from 0–2800 m above sea-level. They live on rocky, clayish, or sandy soils; many species tolerate saline conditions.

== Photosynthesis pathway ==
All species of Halothamnus show leaf anatomy with Kranz arrangement of the Salsola-type. Physiological investigations confirmed that they are all C4-plants.

== Economic importance ==
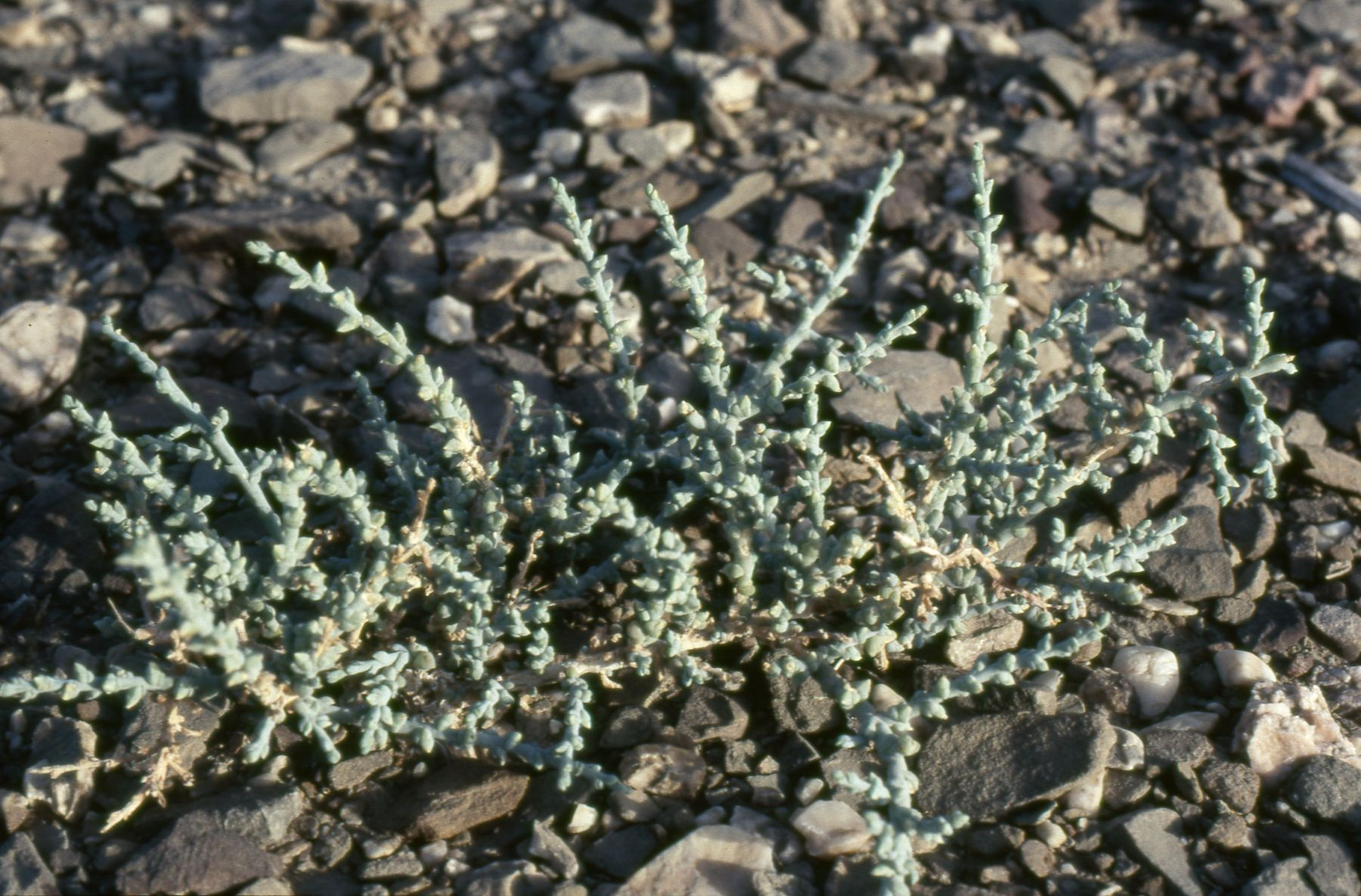
Halothamnus iranicus

Some species of Halothamnus are important grazing plants for camels, sheep and goats, and are therefore used for the recultivation of pasture, for example Halothamnus subaphyllus, Halothamnus auriculus and Halothamnus glaucus. Halothamnus subaphyllus is planted for the stabilisation of mobile sands and for the production of the medically used alkaloid Salsolin. Halothamnus somalensis is used as medicinal plant against parasitic worms. In former times Halothamnus subaphyllus and Halothamnus glaucus were used to extract potash for making soap.

== Systematics ==
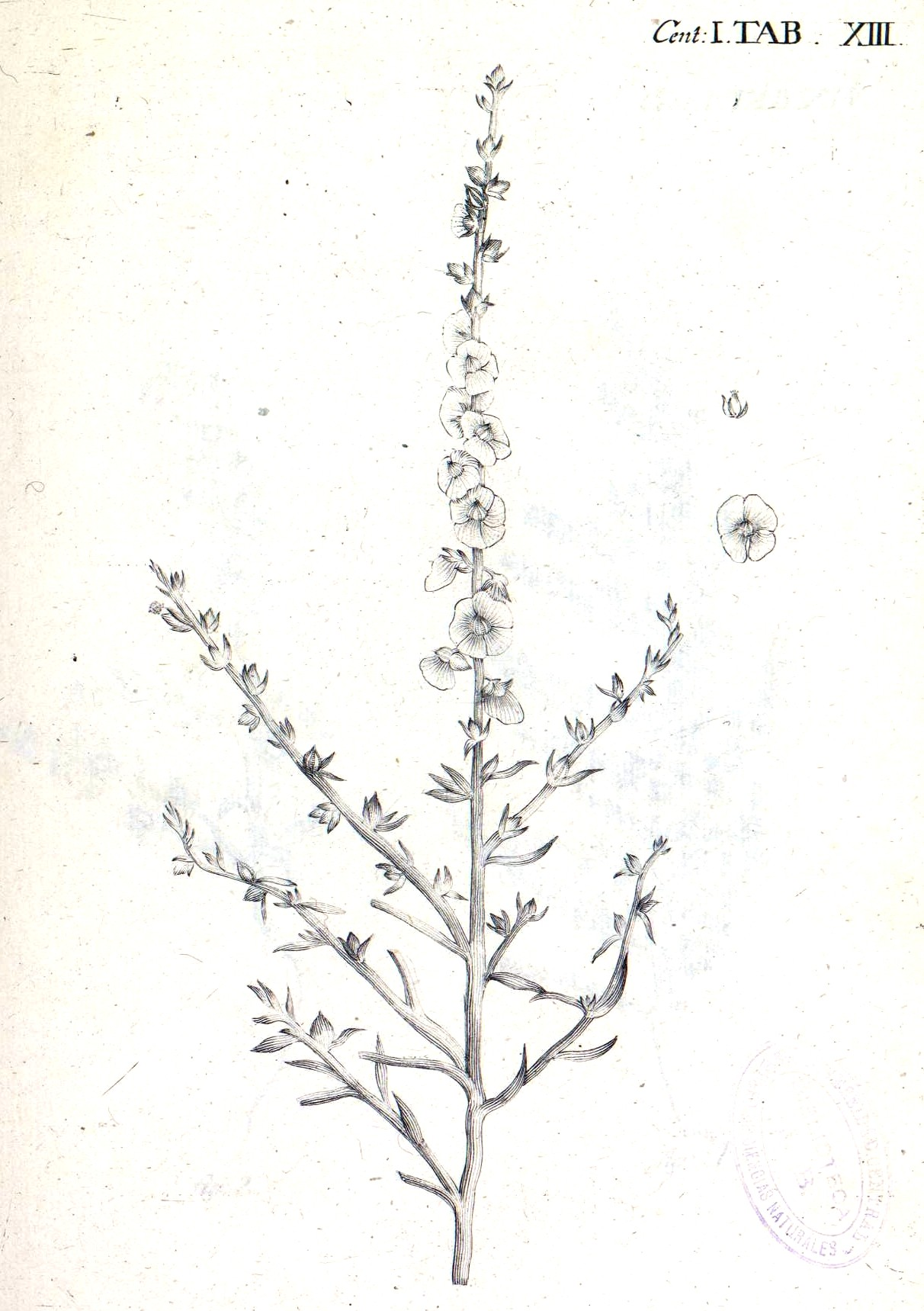
The first illustration of a Halothamnus plant, 1728 as "Kali fruticosum spicatum" by J.C. Buxbaum, showing Halothamnus glaucus

The genus Halothamnus belongs to the subfamily Salsoloideae within the family Amaranthaceae, (formerly Chenopodiaceae). It is grouped to Tribus Salsoleae, Subtribus Sodinae, and is closely related to genus Salsola.

The genus Halothamnus was first described in 1845 by Hippolyte François Jaubert and Édouard Spach (in Illustrationes Plantarum Orientalium, 2, 50, pl. 136). The type of the genus is Halothamnus bottae, at that time the only species. In 1981, Victor Petrovič Botschantzev included the genus Aellenia here and enlarged Halothamnus to 25 species. After a revision by Gabriele Kothe-Heinrich (1993), the genus is classified into 2 sections with 21 accepted species:

- Sect. Pungentifolia Kothe-Heinr.
  - Halothamnus beckettii Botsch.
- Sect. Halothamnus
  - Halothamnus somalensis (N.E.Br.) Botsch.
  - Halothamnus bottae Jaub. & Spach - with 2 subspecies
  - Halothamnus iranicus Botsch.
  - Halothamnus hierochunticus (Bornm.) Botsch.
  - Halothamnus iliensis (Lipsky) Botsch.
  - Halothamnus auriculus (Moq.) Botsch. - with 2 subspecies
  - Halothamnus kermanensis Kothe-Heinr.
  - Halothamnus afghanicus Kothe-Heinr.
  - Halothamnus lancifolius (Boiss.) Kothe-Heinr.
  - Halothamnus cinerascens (Moq.) Kothe-Heinr. - with 2 subspecies
  - Halothamnus glaucus (M.Bieb.) Botsch. - with 3 subspecies
  - Halothamnus bamianicus (Gilli) Botsch.
  - Halothamnus schurobi (Botsch.)
  - Halothamnus turcomanicus Botsch.
  - Halothamnus ferganensis Botsch.
  - Halothamnus sistanicus (De Marco & Dinelli) Kothe-Heinr.
  - Halothamnus oxianus Botsch.
  - Halothamnus seravschanicus Botsch.
  - Halothamnus iraqensis Botsch.
  - Halothamnus subaphyllus (C.Meyer) Botsch. - with 3 subspecies
