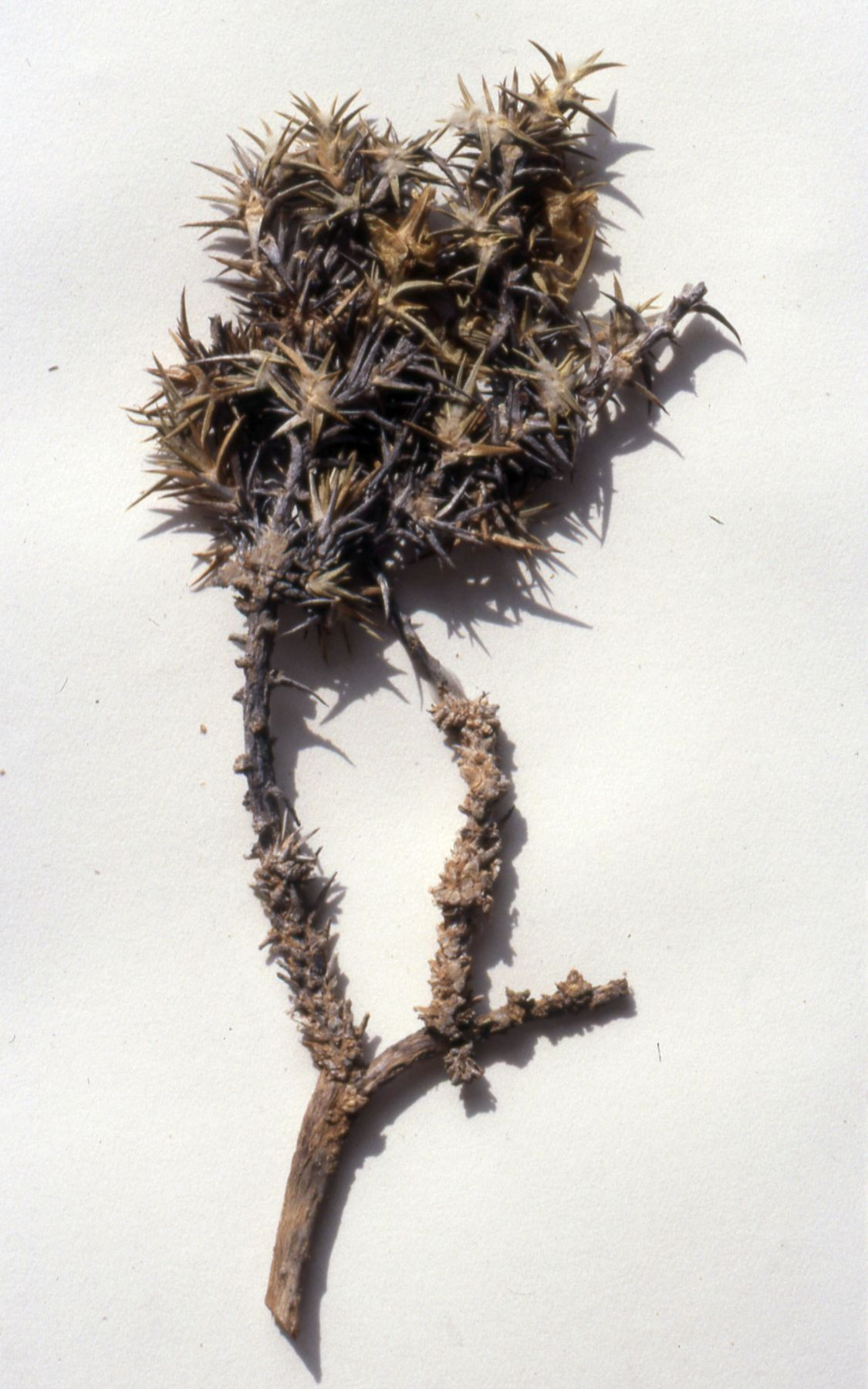

Scientific classification
- Kingdom: Plantae
- Clade: Tracheophytes
- Clade: Angiosperms
- Clade: Eudicots
- Order: Caryophyllales
- Family: Amaranthaceae
- Genus: Halothamnus
- Species: H. beckettii

Binomial name
- Halothamnus beckettii Botsch.

= Halothamnus beckettii =

Species of flowering plant

Halothamnus beckettii is a species of the plant genus Halothamnus, that is now included into the family Amaranthaceae, (formerly Chenopodiaceae). It is the only member of the section H. sect. Pungentifolia, which differs from H. sect. Halothamnus by hard leaves with spiny apex. It is endemic to Somalia.

== Morphology ==
Halothamnus beckettii is a sub-shrub only 20–40 cm high, strongly branched and densely foliated. The whole surface of the plant is covered with small white pustules. The half-terete leaves with concave upper side are narrowly triangular, with dense tufts of long curly hairs in their axils, about 11 mm long, and with a cartilaginous spiny apex. The flowers are 7,5-8,5 mm long (longer than other Halothamnus species). The winged fruit is 11–13 mm in diameter, their wings inserting at 1/5 of the fruit height, the tepal lobes with prominent mid rib.

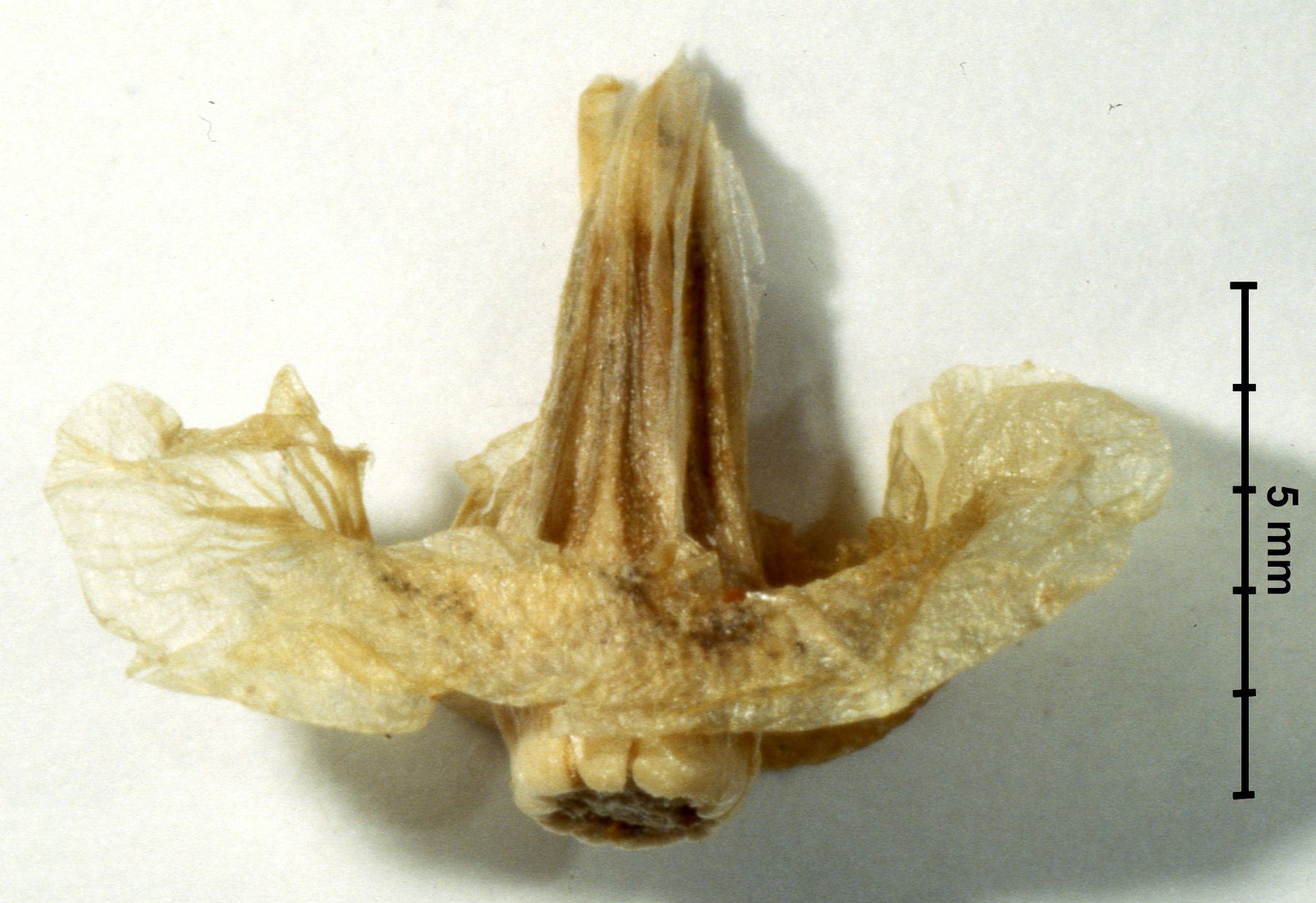
fruit (lateral view)

=== Anatomy ===
The leaf anatomy of Halothamnus beckettii is unique in this genus: the peripheral bundles at the inside of the layer of Kranz-cells contain extreme amounts of lignified tissue.

== Taxonomy ==
Halothamnus beckettii has been first described in 1982 by Victor Petrovič Botschantzev (In: Bot. Žurn. (Moscow) 67(4), 1982, p. 545). The species name refers to the collector of the type specimen, J.J. Beckett. The species has been accepted in "Flora of Somalia" (Vol.1, 1993)

== Distribution ==
Halothamnus beckettii is endemic to Somalia. It is a rare species, known just from a few sites. It grows in dry places (with yearly precipitation of 100–200 mm) among scattered dwarf shrubs or grasses on plateaus or slopes, on limestone or silty sand, up to 700 m.
