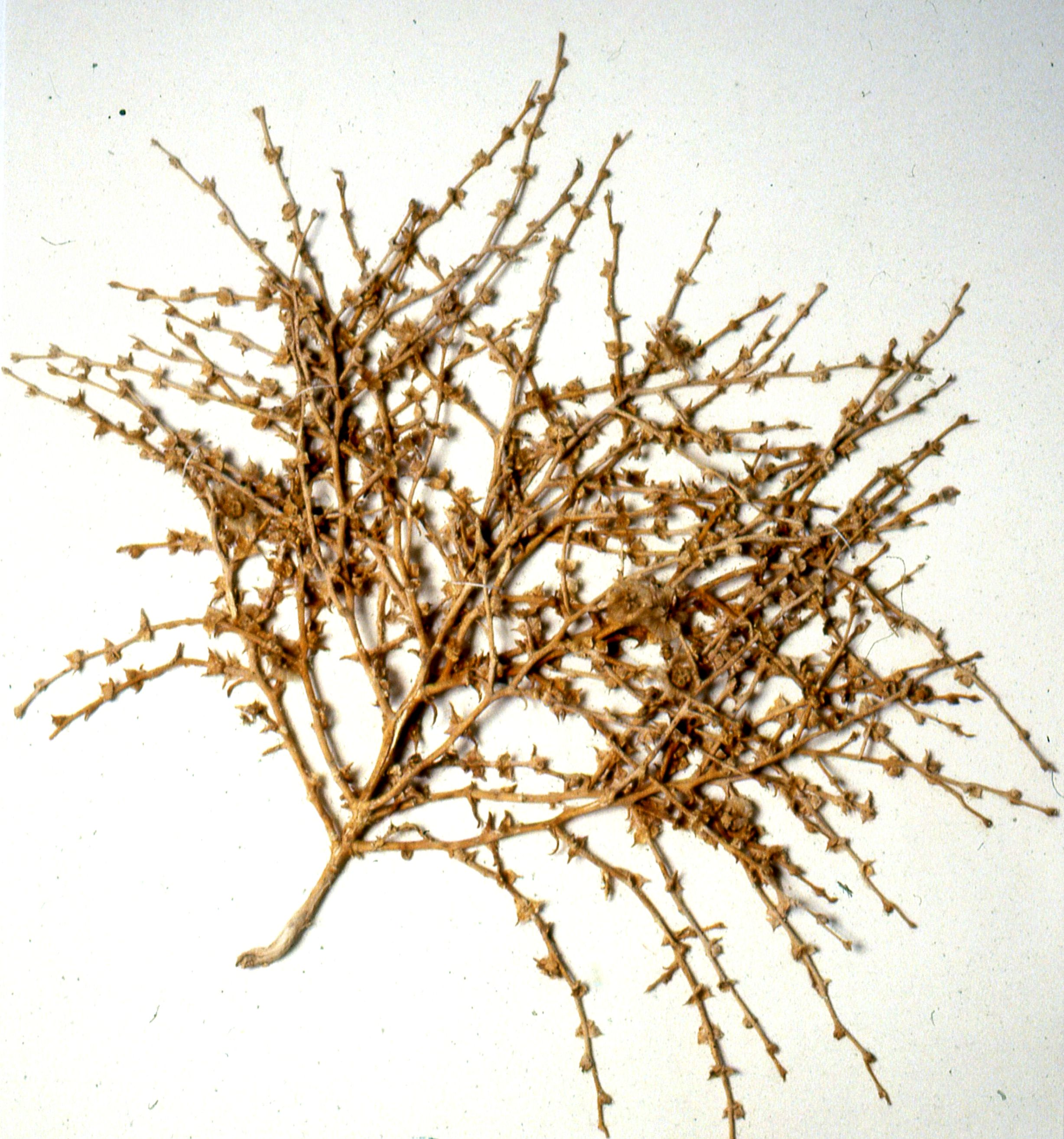

Scientific classification
- Kingdom: Plantae
- Clade: Tracheophytes
- Clade: Angiosperms
- Clade: Eudicots
- Order: Caryophyllales
- Family: Amaranthaceae
- Genus: Halothamnus
- Species: H. hierochunticus

Binomial name
- Halothamnus hierochunticus (Bornm.) Botsch.

Synonyms
- Aellenia hierochuntica (Bornm.) Aellen; Salsola hierochuntica Bornm.

= Halothamnus hierochunticus =

Species of flowering plant

Halothamnus hierochunticus is a species of the plant genus Halothamnus, that belongs to the subfamily Salsoloideae within the family Amaranthaceae, (formerly Chenopodiaceae). It occurs in Southwest Asia and is partly considered as a weed.

== Morphology ==
Halothamnus hierochunticus is an annual plant 40–50 cm high, with blueish-green branches. It smells unpleasantly like rancid butter. The half-terete leaves are linear to linear-triangular, and up to 30 (rarely 50) mm long. The flowers are at 6–13 mm distance from each other, 2,8-3,3 mm long, somewhat shorter than their bract and bracteoles, with triangular tepals. The stigmas have a truncate apex. The winged fruit is 10–16 mm in diameter, their wings inserting in the middle of the fruit height. The fruit tube has concave sides with sharply prominent ridges (veins). At its bottom, a narrow prominent peripheral rim surrounds the large roundish pits.

In the lower parts of the plants, the fruits are heavier with shorter wings, in the upper part fruits are lighter with larger wings (heterocarpy).

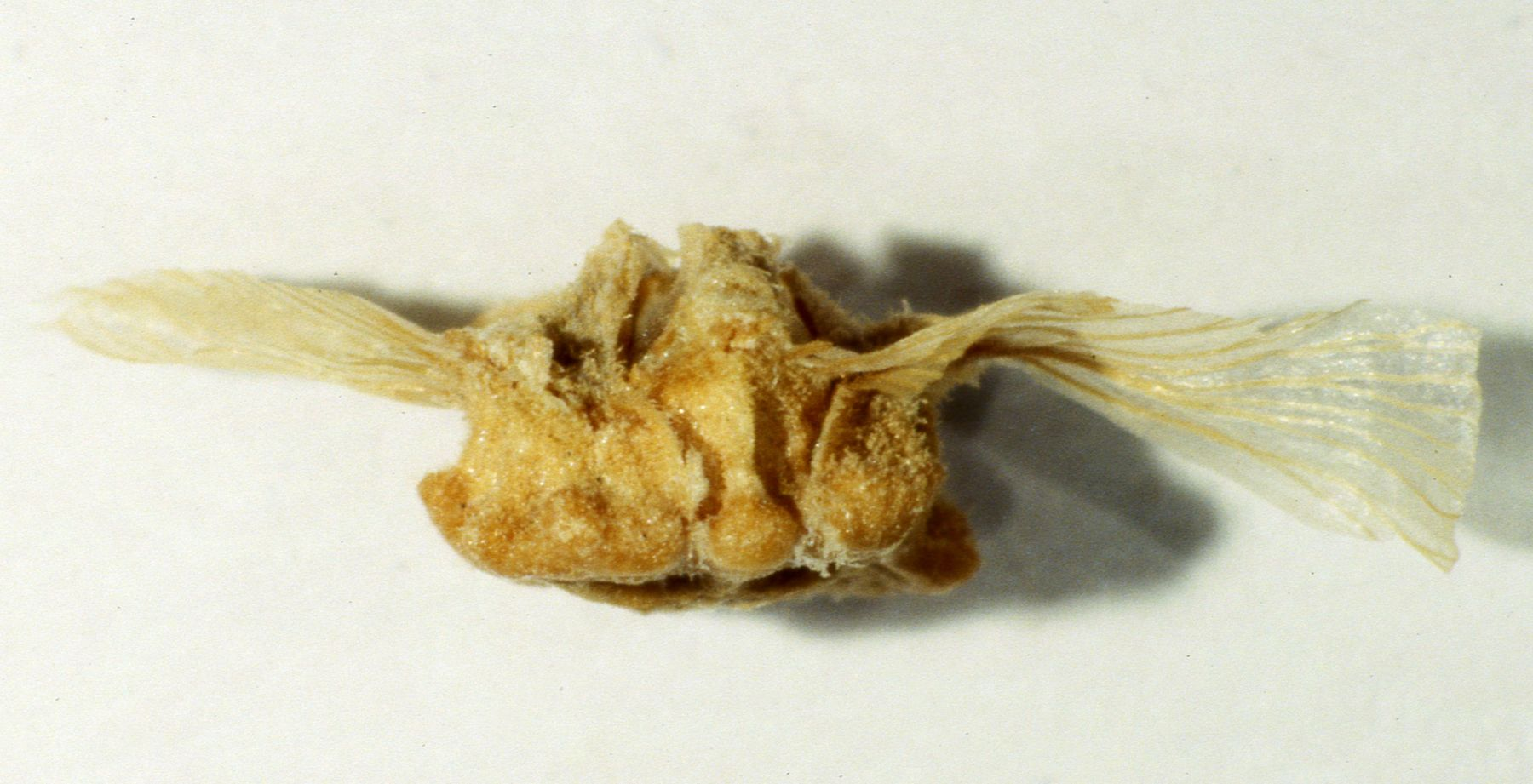
fruit, lateral view

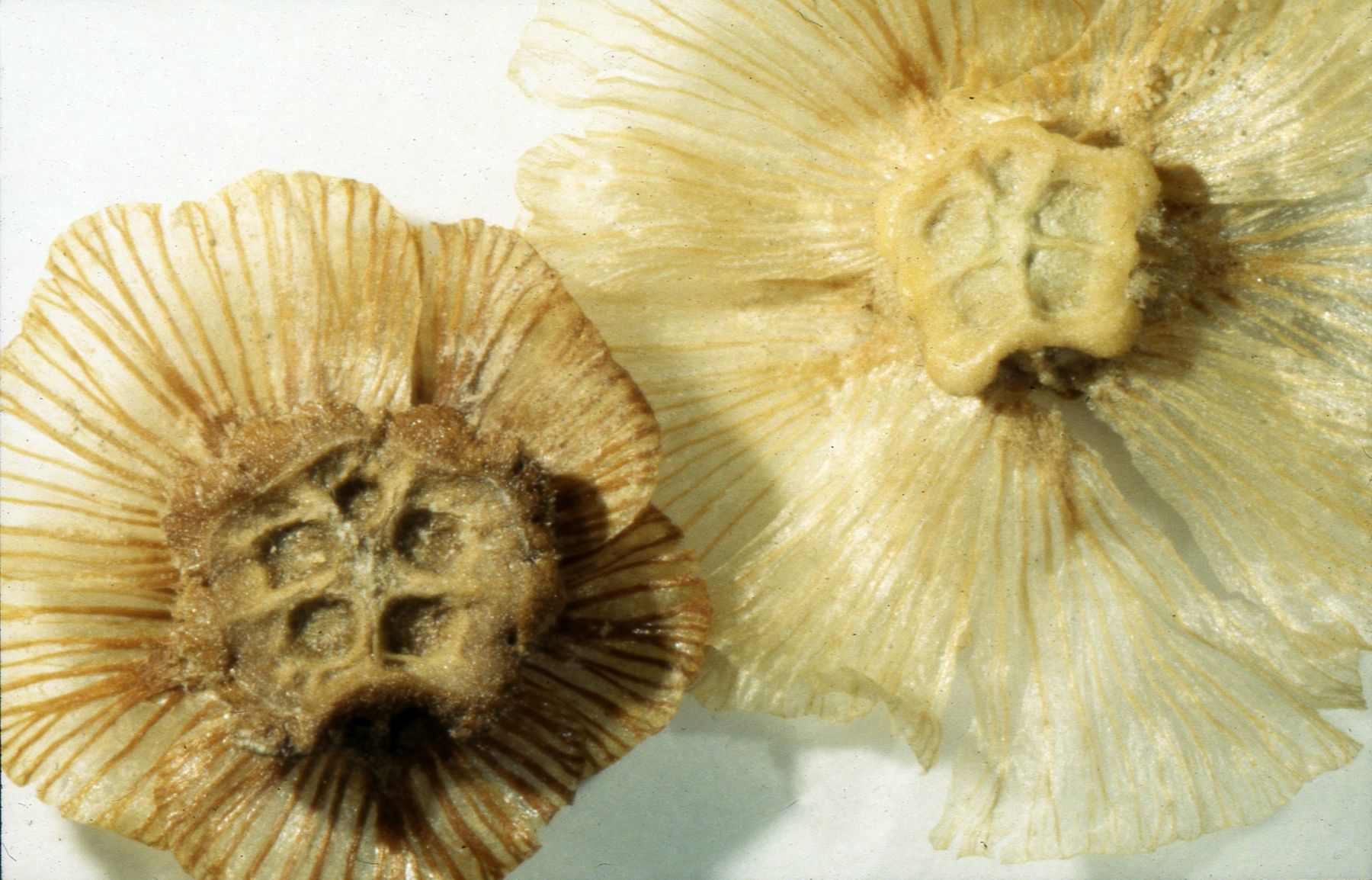
fruits, bottom, from lower part of plant (left) and from upper part (right)

== Taxonomy ==
The species has been first described in 1912 as Salsola hierochuntica by Joseph Friedrich Nicolaus Bornmüller (in: Zur Flora Palästinas. – in: Beih. Bot. Centralbl. 29,2, 1912, p. 13). In 1981, Victor Petrovič Botschantzev included it into the genus Halothamnus (in: Bot. Mater. Gerb. Bot. Inst. Komarova Akad. Nauk SSSR 18: 156). Within the genus, it belongs to the section Halothamnus.

Synonyms

- Salsola hierochuntica Bornm.
- Salsola autrani Post. var. hierochuntica (Bornm.) Eig.
- Aellenia hierochuntica (Bornm.) Aellen
- Aellenia autrani (Post) Zoh. (but not synonym: Salsola autrani Post)
- Aellenia autrani (Post) Zoh. var. hierochuntica (Bornm.) Zoh., nom. inval

Vernacular names

- Hebrew: אֵלֶנְיָה נָאָה

== Distribution ==
The distribution area of Halothamnus hierochunticus extends from Turkey (SE-Anatolia), Lebanon, Syria, Israel and Palestine, Jordan, Iraq to western Iran. At two disjunct sites in Iran (Gilan and Fars) the species could have been imported as a weed. It grows in fields, where partly it seems to be a troublesome weed, and on ruderal places like roadsides or ruins, on loess or sand, often on saline soils, up to 1500 m above sea level.
