= Coleophora aelleniae =

Scientific classification
- Kingdom: Animalia
- Phylum: Arthropoda
- Class: Insecta
- Order: Lepidoptera
- Family: Coleophoridae
- Genus: Coleophora
- Species: C. aelleniae

Binomial name
- Coleophora aelleniae Falkovich, 1972

Species of moth

Coleophora aelleniae is a moth of the family Coleophoridae. It is found in Uzbekistan.

The larvae feed on Halothamnus subaphyllus. Larvae can be found from May to June. Fully fed larvae hibernate.
