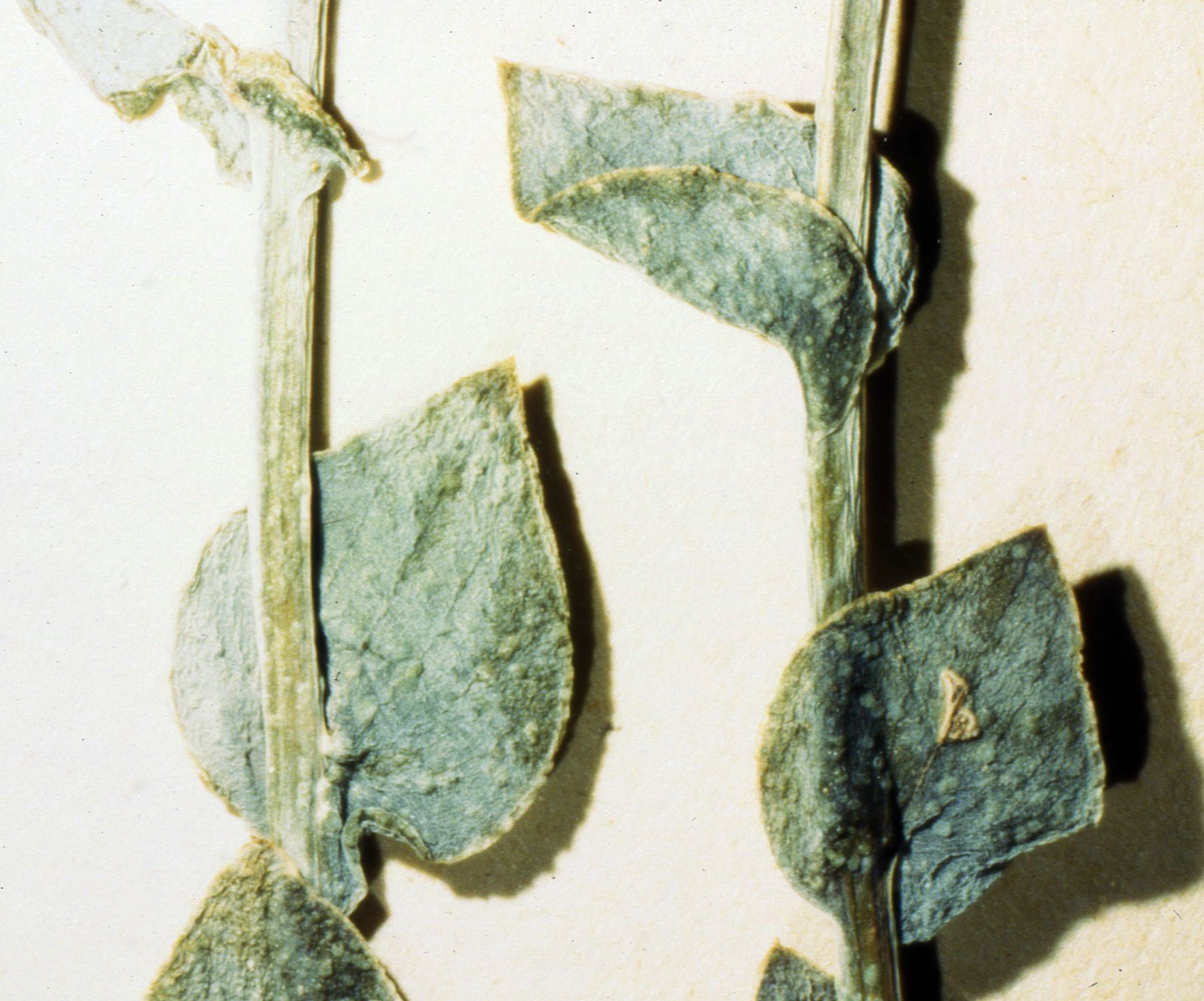
- Leaves

Scientific classification
- Kingdom: Plantae
- Clade: Tracheophytes
- Clade: Angiosperms
- Clade: Eudicots
- Order: Caryophyllales
- Family: Amaranthaceae
- Genus: Halothamnus
- Species: H. auriculus

Binomial name
- Halothamnus auriculus (Moq.) Botsch.

Subspecies
- 2 subspecies, see text

= Halothamnus auriculus =

Species of flowering plant

Halothamnus auriculus is a species of the plant genus Halothamnus, that belongs to the subfamily Salsoloideae of the family Amaranthaceae, (formerly Chenopodiaceae). It occurs in Western and Middle Asia.

== Morphology ==
Halothamnus auriculus is a sub-shrub up to 90 cm high, with olive-grey or blueish-green pale-striate branches. The flat and slightly fleshy leaves are very variably shaped (lanceolate, triangular, ovate, cordate, kidney-shaped, or roundish), up to 68 mm long and 2,5–45 mm wide, with distinct membranous margins, often half-stem-clasping, the lower ones often decurrent, the upper ones often auriculate. The bracts are similar to the leaves. The bracteoles are adpressed to the perianth, scale-like, surrounded by membranous margins, shorter than perianth. The flowers are 3,4-1,7 mm long, the stigmas are widened and truncate at the apex. The winged fruit is 12–18 mm in diameter, their wings inserting in or above the middle. The tube of the fruit is broadly barrel-shaped, at its bottom with deep, furrow-like, linear or curved pits.

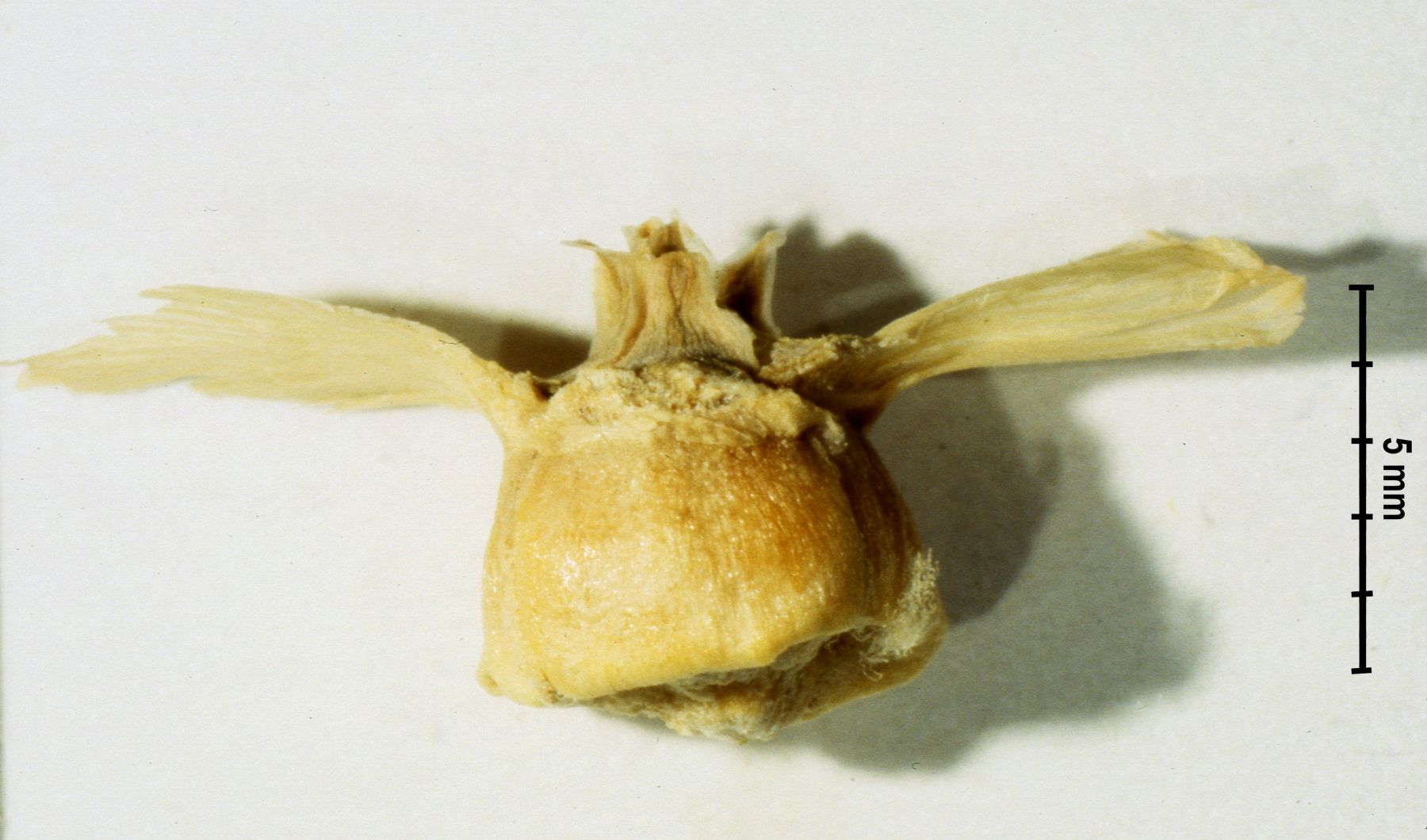
fruit (lateral view)

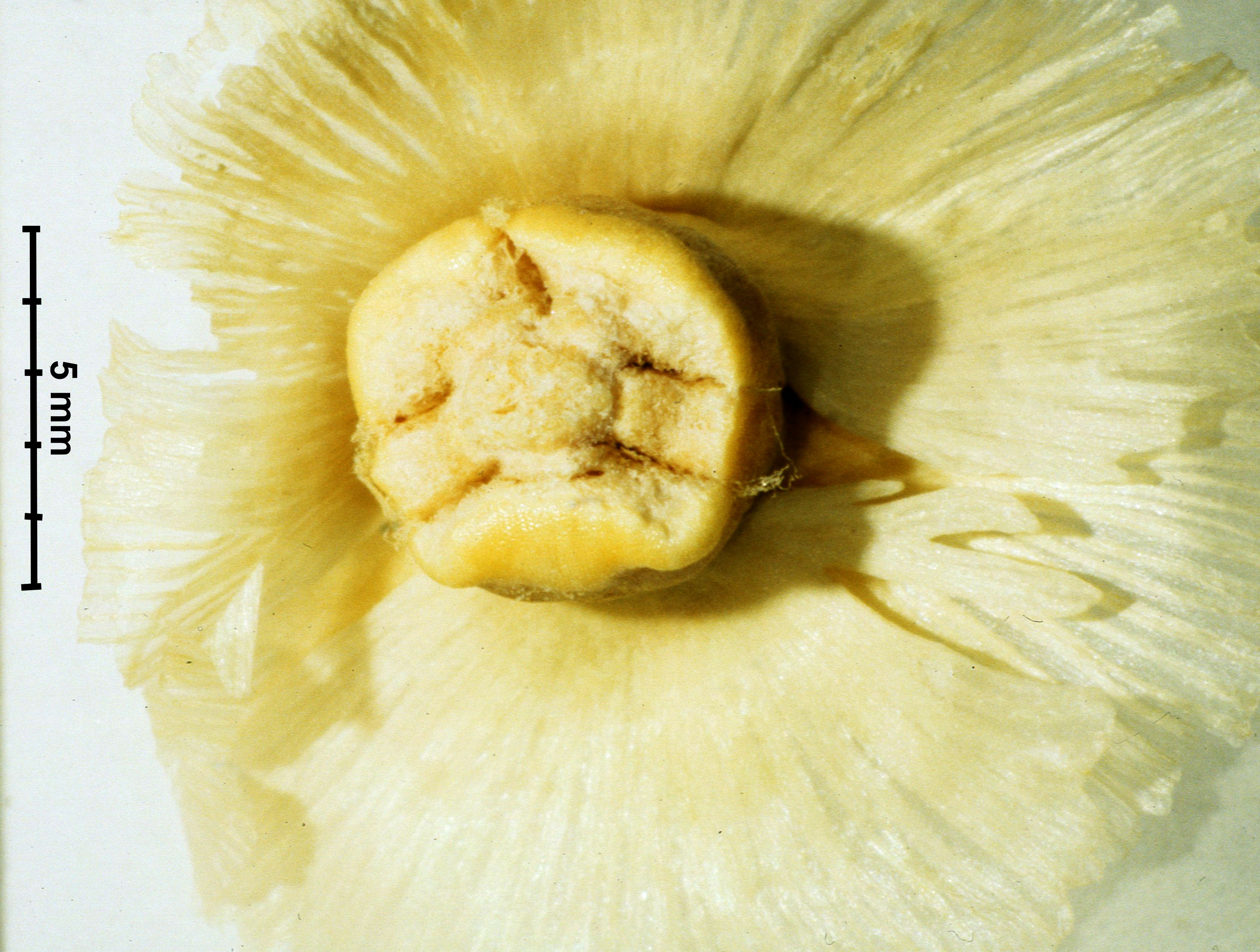
fruit (bottom)

The subspecies H. auriculus subsp. acutifolius differs from subsp. auriculus by lanceolate, only 2,5–9 mm wide leaves, that are hardly clasping and not or very shortly decurrent, and by longer stigmas.

== Taxonomy ==
The species has been first published in 1834 by Alfred Moquin-Tandon as Salsola auricula (an image without description in C. P. Bélanger: Voyage aux Indes Orientales. Botanique I, Phanérogames, Paris). Moquin added the first description in 1840 (In: Chenopodearum Monographica Enumeratio, Paris, p. 135.) Victor Petrovič Botschantzev included the species into the genus Halothamnus in 1981 (In: Botaniceskjij Žurnal SSSR 66,1, p. 134). Within the genus, it belongs to section Halothamnus.

The species comprises two subspecies:

H. auriculus subsp. auriculus

Synonyms:

- Salsola auricula Moq
- Caroxylon auriculum (Moq.) Moq.
- Aellenia auricula (Moq.) Ulbr.
- Salsola moquiniana Jaub. & Spach
- Halothamnus moquinianus (Jaub. & Spach) Botsch.

H. auriculus subsp. acutifolius (Moq.) Kothe-Heinr.

Synonyms:

- Salsola auricula β. acutifolia Moq.
- Salsola decurrens Jaub. & Spach
- Caroxylon acutifolium (Moq.) Moq., nom. illeg.
- Salsola acutifolia (Moq.) Bunge, nom. illeg.
- Halothamnus acutifolius (Moq.) Botsch., nom. illeg.

== Distribution ==
The distribution area of Halothamnus auriculus covers northern Iran, Pakistan (Baluchistan), Afghanistan, southern Turkmenistan, Tajikistan, Uzbekistan and Kyrgyzstan. It grows in semideserts and dry shrubland on clay-gravel, often saline or gypsum soils from 500– 2550 m above sea-level.

== Cultivation and uses ==
Halothamnus auriculus is a good fodder plant and is planted for recultivation of pasture. In their leaves the plants accumulate boron. The whole plant contains the phytochemical compounds Quercetin-3-glucoside, 8-C-glucopyranosylapigenin, 5,6-dihydroxy-3′,4′,7-trimethoxy-flavone, 4′,5,7-trihydroxy-3′,6-dimethoxy-flavone, Quercetin-3′,4′-dimethyl ether, Allantoic acid, Allantoin, Oleanolic acid, β-Sitosterol, β-Sitosterol 3-O-β-D-glucopyranoside, and Lupeol.
