= Coleophora halothamni =

Scientific classification
- Kingdom: Animalia
- Phylum: Arthropoda
- Class: Insecta
- Order: Lepidoptera
- Family: Coleophoridae
- Genus: Coleophora
- Species: C. halothamni

Binomial name
- Coleophora halothamni Falkovitsh, 1989

Species of moth

Coleophora halothamni is a moth of the family Coleophoridae.

The larvae feed on Halothamnus subaphyllus. They feed on the generative organs of their host plant.
