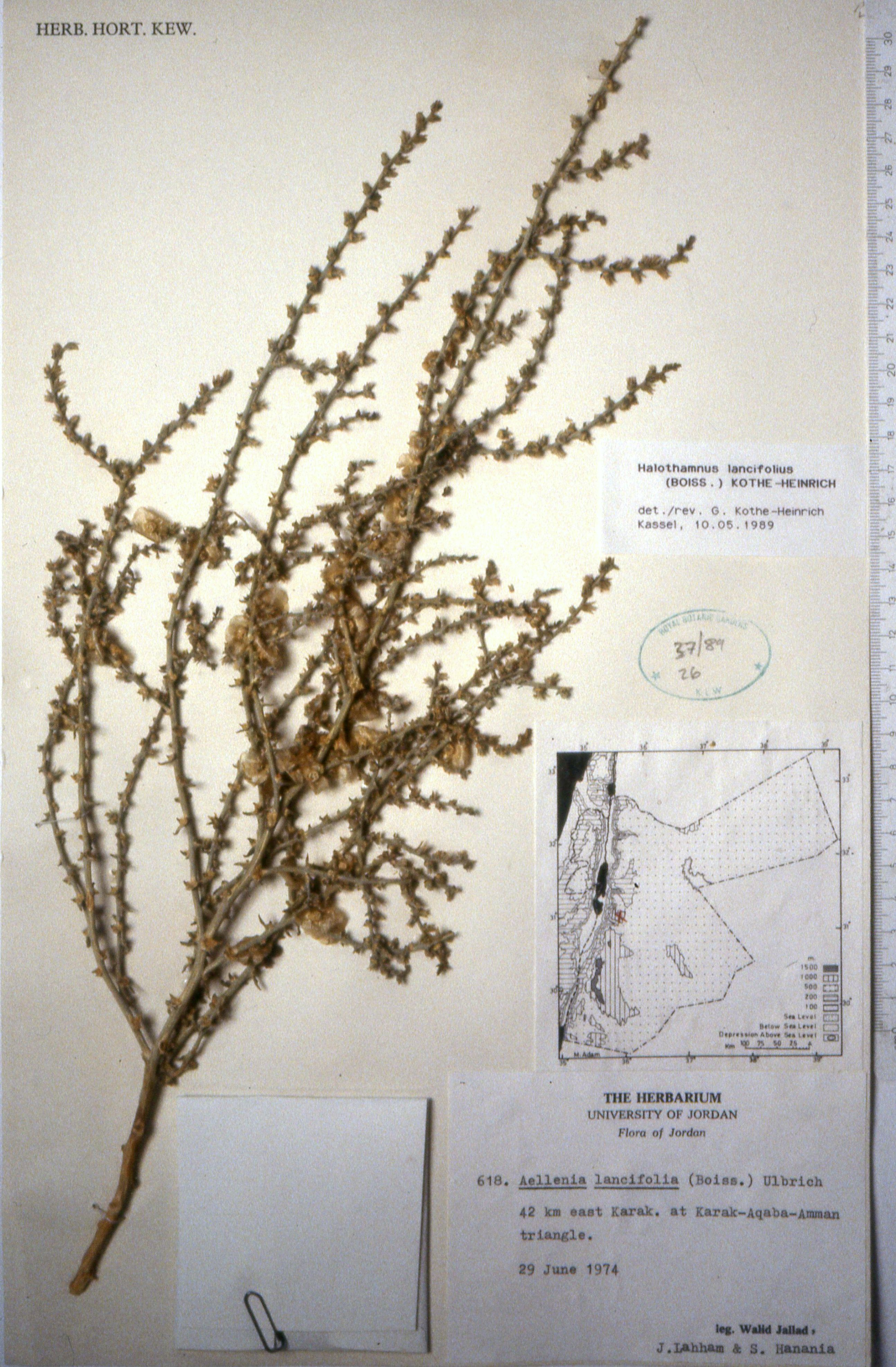

Scientific classification
- Kingdom: Plantae
- Clade: Tracheophytes
- Clade: Angiosperms
- Clade: Eudicots
- Order: Caryophyllales
- Family: Amaranthaceae
- Genus: Halothamnus
- Species: H. lancifolius

Binomial name
- Halothamnus lancifolius (Boiss.) Kothe-Heinr.

Synonyms
- Aellenia lancifolia (Boiss.) Ulbr.; Caroxylon lancifolium Boiss.; Salsola lancifolia (Boiss.) Boiss.

= Halothamnus lancifolius =

Species of plant in the family Annonaceae

Halothamnus lancifolius is a species of the plant genus Halothamnus, that belongs to the subfamily Salsoloideae within the family Amaranthaceae, (formerly Chenopodiaceae). It occurs in Southwest Asia.

== Morphology ==
Halothamnus lancifolius is a sub-shrub up to 45 cm high, with blueish-green pale-striped branches. The leaves are flat, somewhat fleshy, lanceolate-triangular or linear-triangulate, and up to 43 mm long and 1,9-4,5 mm wide, decurrent at their base for 1–5 mm along the stem. The bracts and bracteoles are flat and lanceolate, the bracteoles obliquely standing off, basally with membraneous margins. The flowers are 3,8-4,8 mm long with lanceolate-oval tepals, the stigmas are rounded at their tip. The winged fruit is 9–14 mm in diameter, their wings inserting below the middle, the tepal lobes forming a steep cone. The tube of the fruit is cylindric, its bottom with deep furrow-like, linear or curved pits.

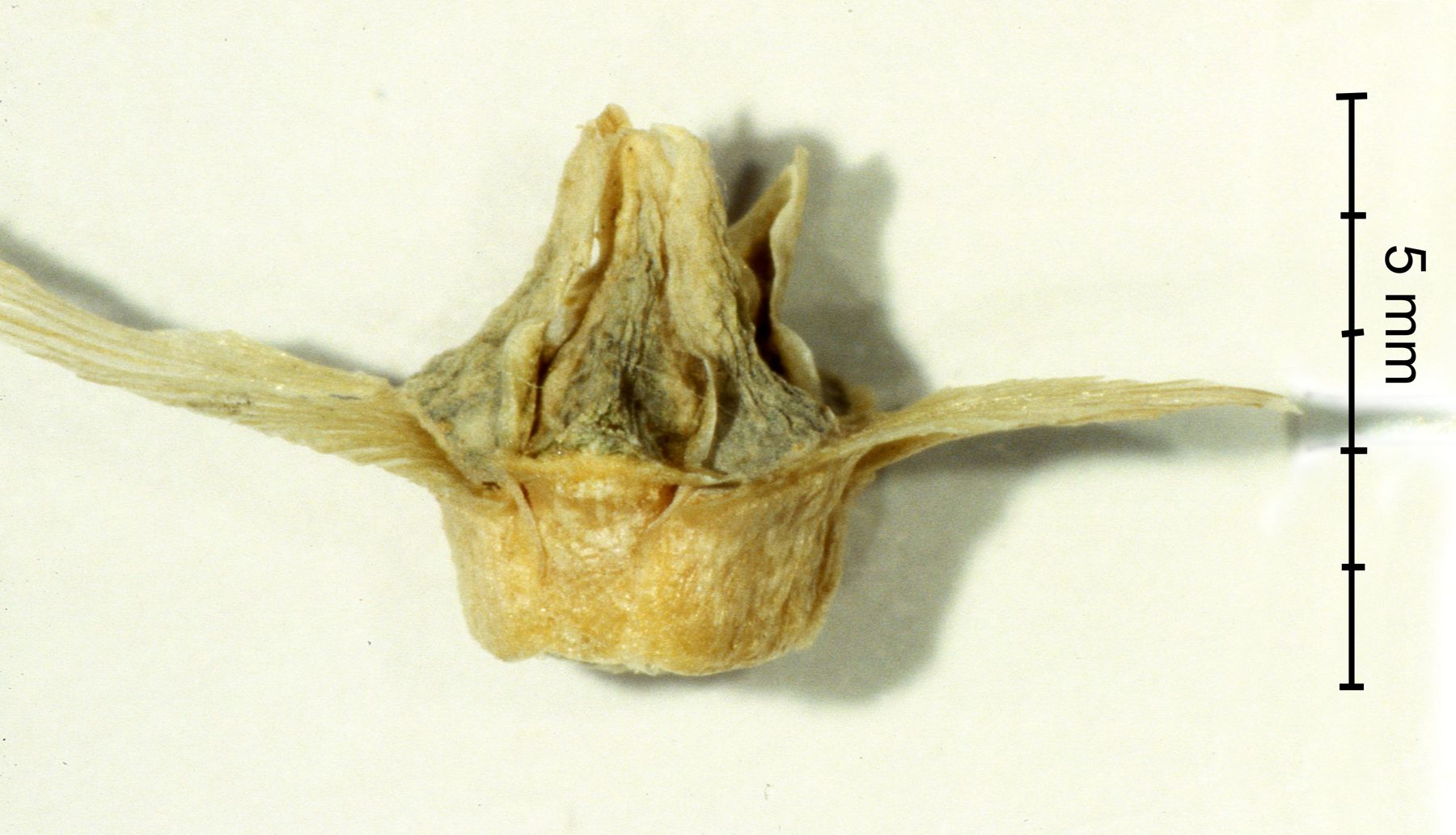
fruit (lateral view)

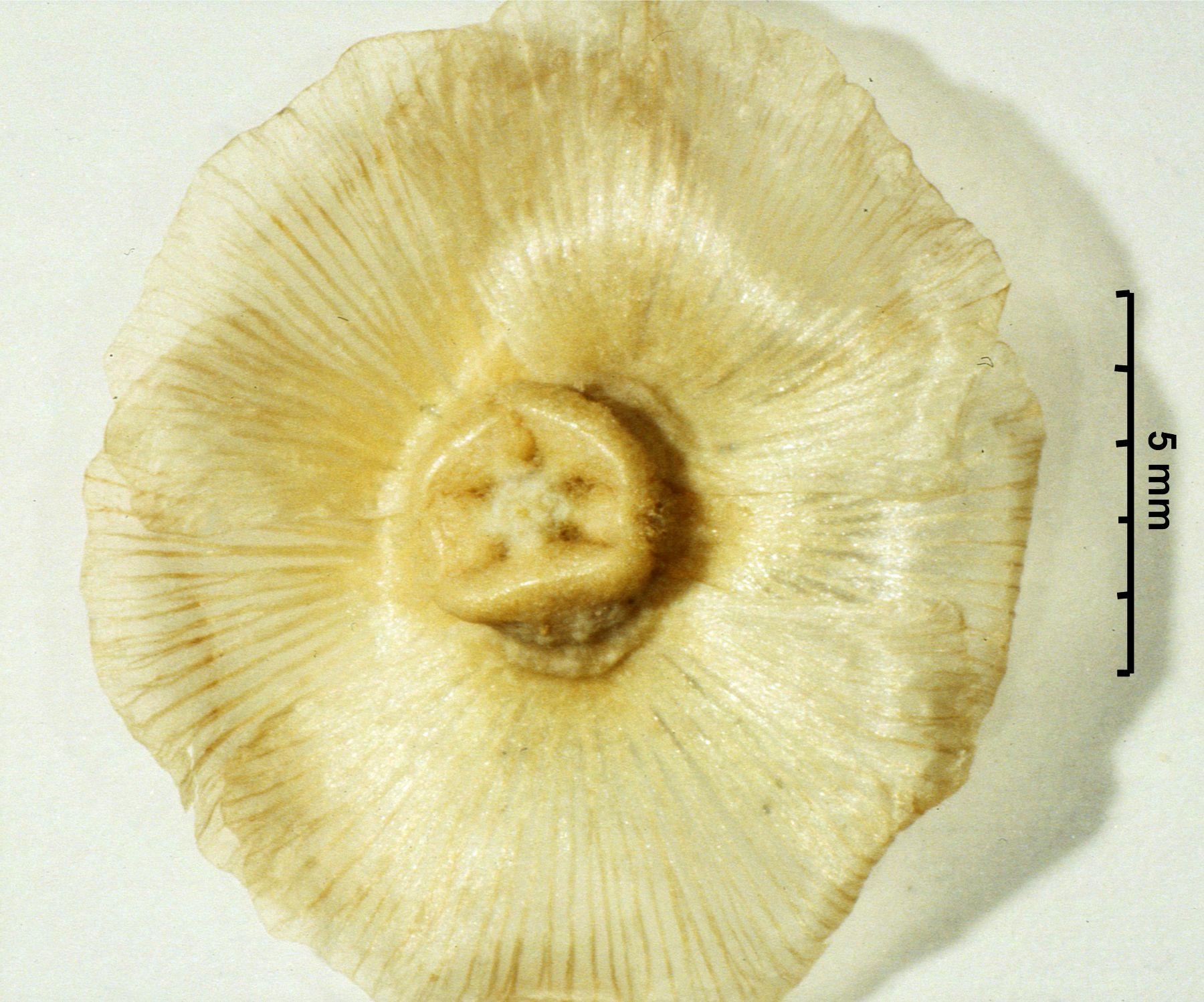
fruit (bottom

== Distribution ==
The distribution of Halothamnus lancifolius covers Syria, Israel and Palestine, Jordan, western Iraq, Egypt (Sinai) and northwestern Saudi Arabia. It grows on stony ground, often on salty soils, from 400 m below sea level up to 1500 m above sea-level.

== Taxonomy ==
The species has been first described in 1853 by Pierre Edmond Boissier as Caroxylon lancifolium (In: Diagnoses plantarum orientalium novarum, ser. 1,12, Neocomi, 1853, p. 98). Gabriele Kothe-Heinrich classified it at species rank into the genus Halothamnus in 1993. Within the genus, it belongs to section Halothamnus.

Synonyms

- Caroxylon lancifolium Boiss.
- Salsola lancifolia (Boiss.) Boiss.
- Aellenia lancifolia (Boiss.) Ulbr.
- Aellenia glauca (Bieb.) Aellen subsp. lancifolia (Boiss.) Aellen
- Aellenia lancifolia (Boiss.) Aellen, nom.inval.

Vernacular names

Hebrew: אֵלֶנְיָה אִזְמֵלָנִית
