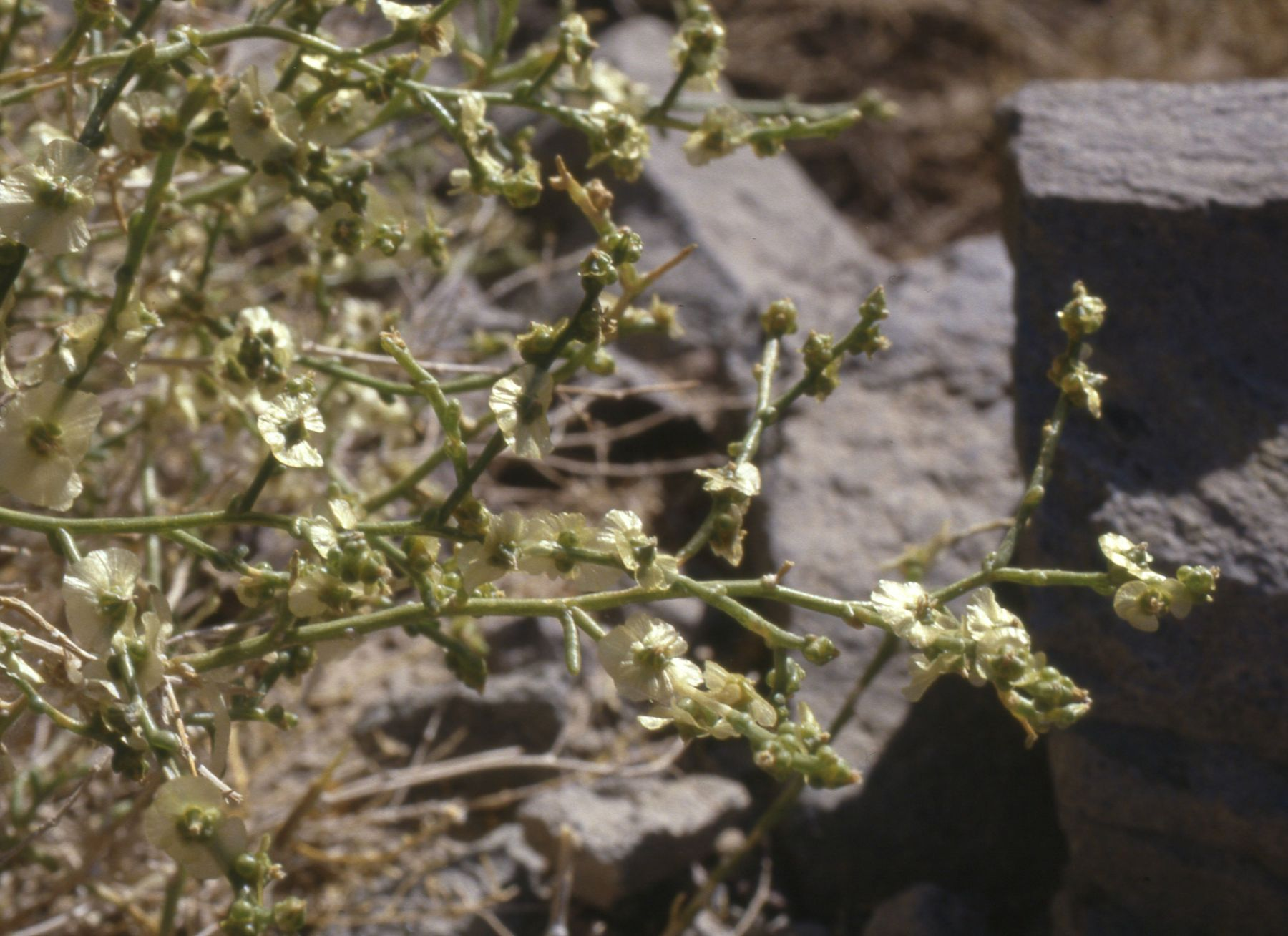
- Halothamnus subaphyllus subsp. charifii

Scientific classification
- Kingdom: Plantae
- Clade: Tracheophytes
- Clade: Angiosperms
- Clade: Eudicots
- Order: Caryophyllales
- Family: Amaranthaceae
- Genus: Halothamnus
- Species: H. subaphyllus

Binomial name
- Halothamnus subaphyllus (C.A.Mey.) Botsch.

Subspecies
- 3 subspecies, see text

= Halothamnus subaphyllus =

Species of plant

Halothamnus subaphyllus is a species of the plant genus Halothamnus, that belongs to the subfamily Salsoloideae within the family Amaranthaceae, (formerly Chenopodiaceae). It occurs in Southwest and Central Asia.

== Morphology ==
Halothamnus subaphyllus is a sub-shrub 0,5-1,2 m high (on sand also shrub up to 2,5 m high), with blueish-green or green branches. The lower leaves are half-terete, fleshy, linear and up to 35 mm long, the upper ones are scale-like, only 1–4 mm long, basally and laterally and mostly at the tip with narrow membranaceous margin. The bracts resemble the leaves, at the upper flowers they are shorter than bracteoles and flowers, with membranaceous margin all around. The bracteoles are scale-like, transverse-oval, with membranaceous margin all around, adjacent to the flowers, together with the bract forming a low cup. The flowers are 3,2-5,0 mm long with oval tepals, the stigmas are truncate at their tip. The winged fruit is 11–17 mm in diameter, their wings inserted in or a bit below the middle. The tube of the fruit is dish-like, narrowed to its base, with prominent ridges, at its bottom with flat, oval to round pits.

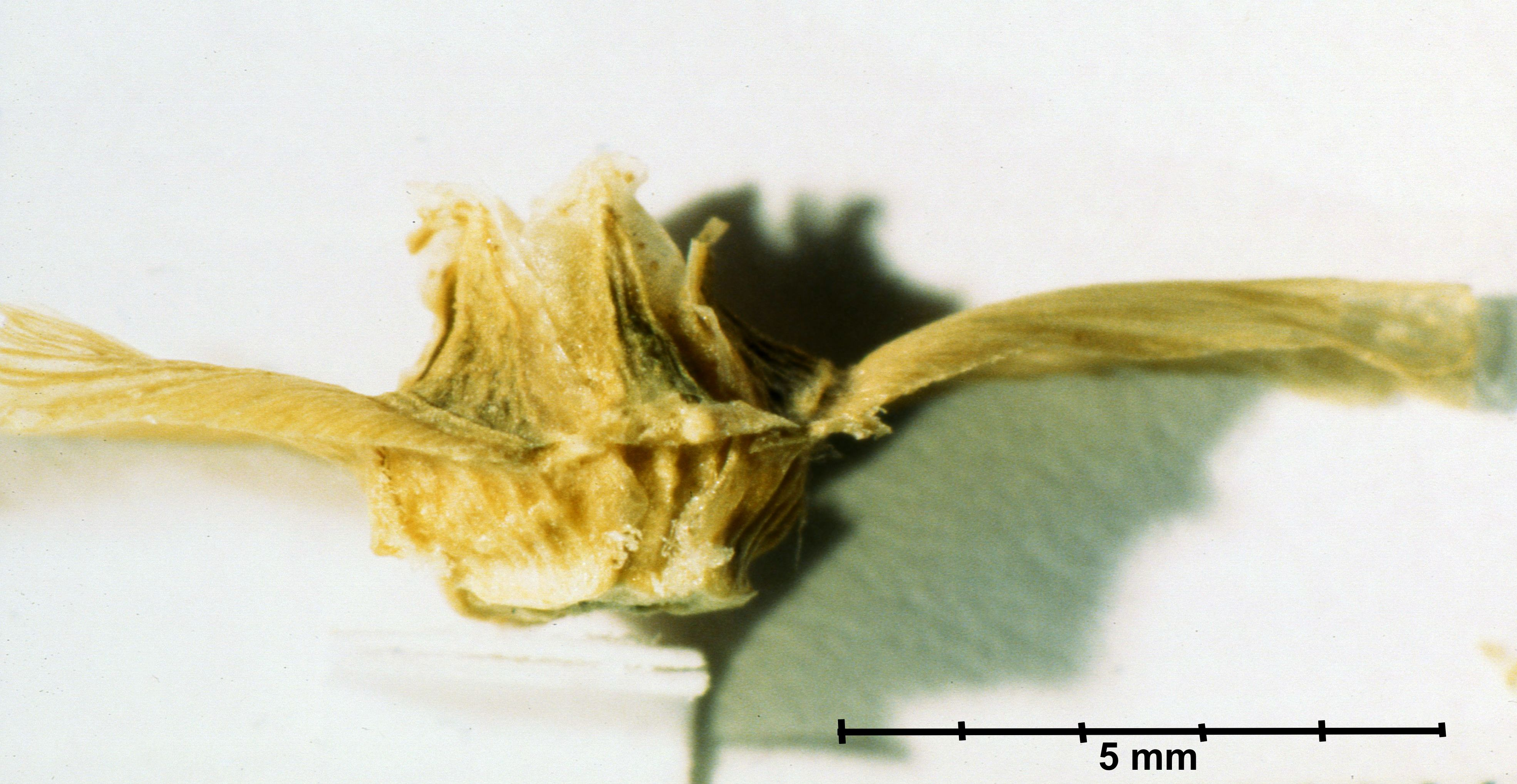
fruit (lateral view)

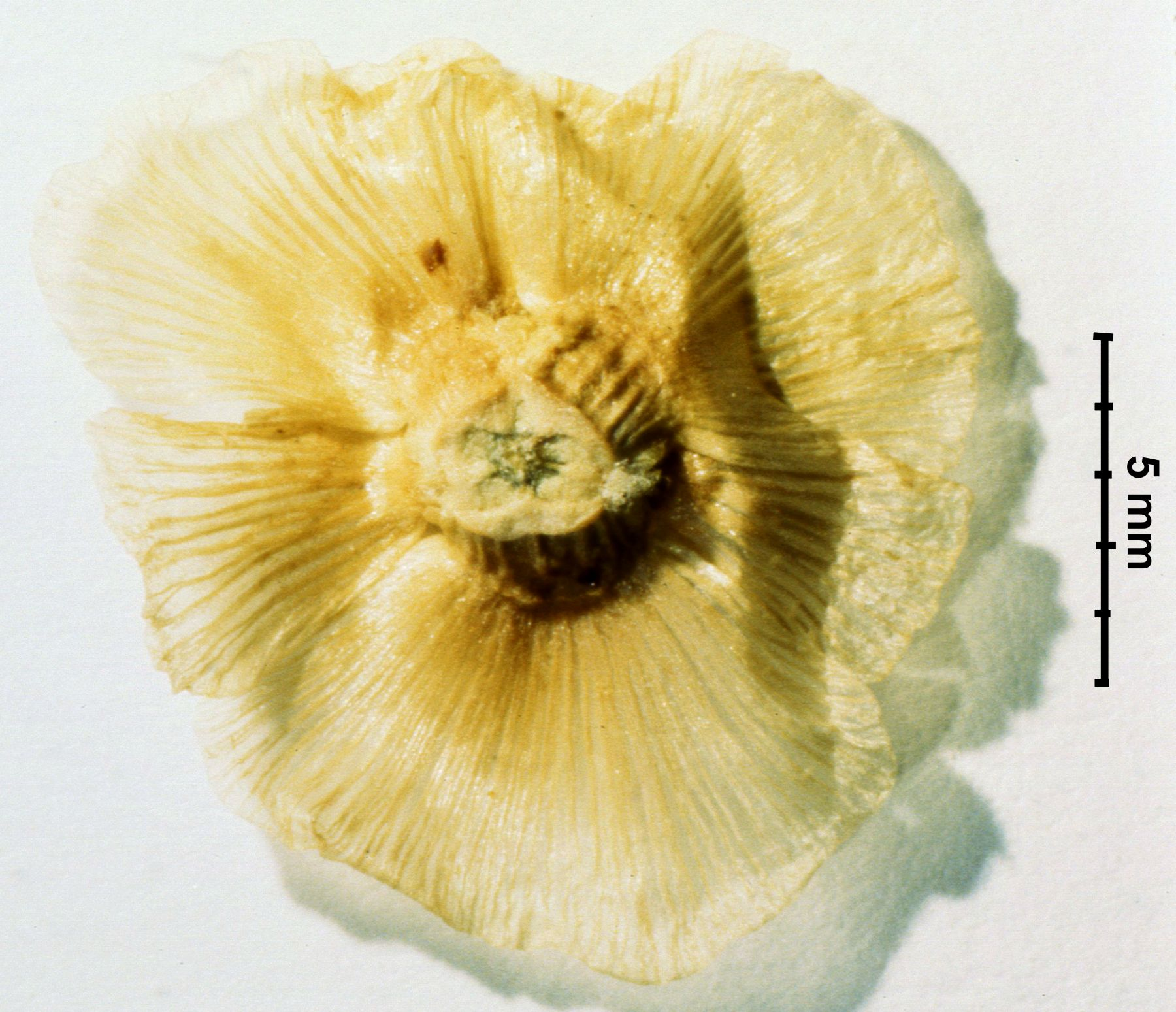
fruit (bottom)

The species comprises three subspecies: the typical subsp. subaphyllus; subsp. psammophilus, a shrub up to 2,5 m with shorter and thinner flower-bearing branches and longer upper leaves; and subsp. charifii, with conspicuous tufts of long curly hairs in the axils of the leaves.

== Taxonomy ==
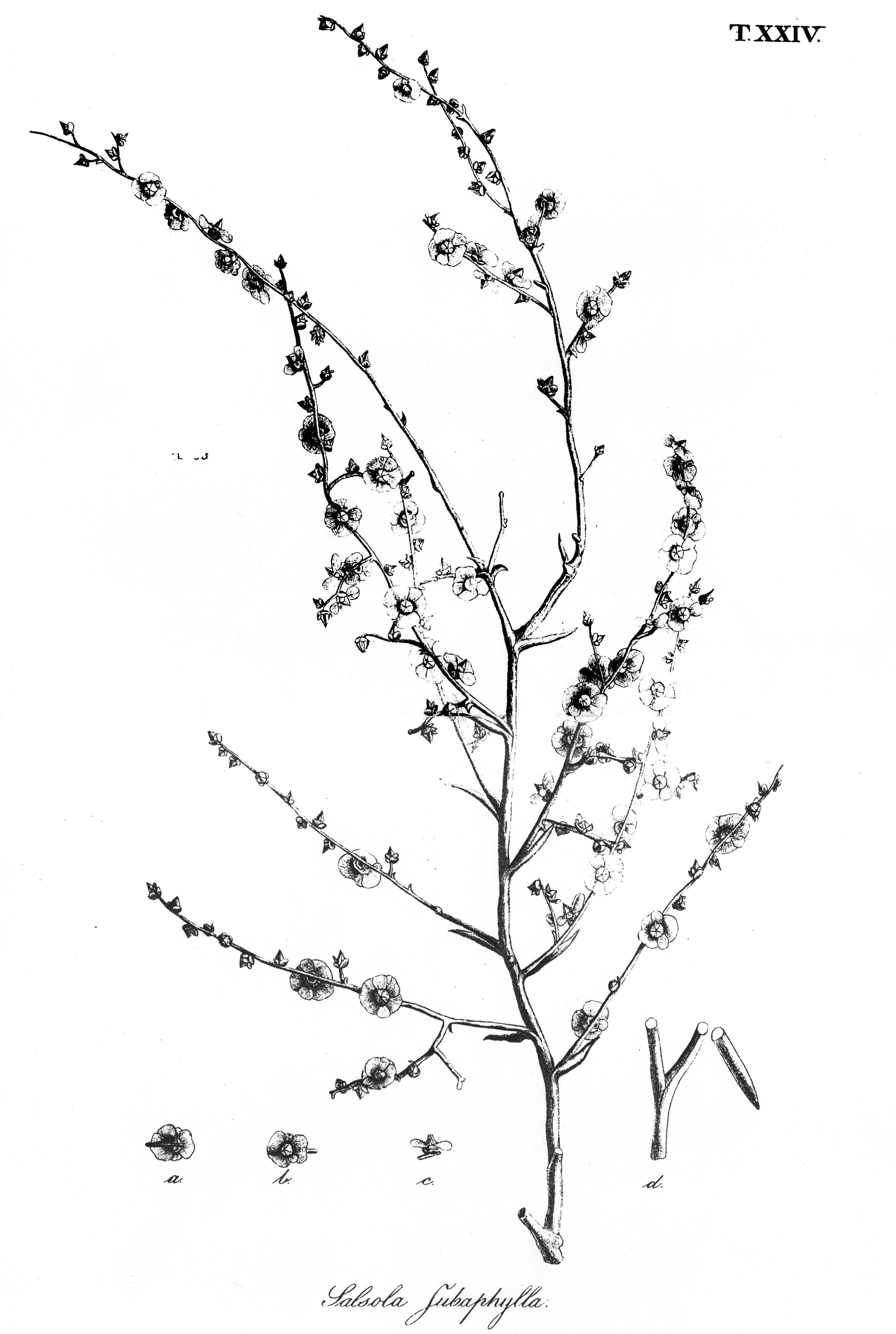
Illustration of Halothamnus subaphyllus from the species description by Carl Anton von Meyer, 1833

The species has been first described in 1833 by Carl Anton von Meyer as Salsola subaphylla (In: Karl Eduard Eichwald: Plantarum novarum vel minus cognitarum, 2, Leipzig, Voss, p. 34, tab, 24). In 1981, Victor Petrovič Botschantzev included it into the genus Halothamnus (In: Bot. Mater. Gerb. Bot. Inst. Komarova Akad. Nauk SSSR = Novosti Sistematiki Vysshikh Rastenii. Moscow & Leningrad 18, p. 171). Within the genus, it belongs to the section Halothamnus.

Halothamnus subaphyllus is classified into three subspecies:

Halothamnus subaphyllus subsp. subaphyllus

Synonyms:

- Salsola subaphylla C.Meyer
- Caroxylon subaphyllum (C.Meyer) Moq.
- Salsola subaphylla C.Meyer var. typica Drobov, nom. inval
- Salsola subaphylla C.Meyer subsp. typica (Drobov) Iljin, nom. inval
- Aellenia subaphylla (C.Meyer) Aellen
- Aellenia subaphylla (C.Meyer) Aellen subsp. eu-subaphylla Aellen, nom.inval
- Aellenia subaphylla (C.Meyer) Botsch. ex Aellen, quoad nom.
- Aellenia subaphylla (C.Meyer) Aellen subsp. subaphylla
- Aellenia subaphylla (C.Meyer) Aellen subsp. sabetii Aellen
- Salsola subaphylla C.Meyer var. arenaria Drobov
- Salsola arenaria (Drobov) Iljin, nom. nud
- Salsola subaphylla C.Meyer subsp. arenaria (Drobov) Iljin
- Aellenia subaphylla (C.Meyer) Aellen subsp. turcomanica Aellen
- Aellenia turcomanica (Aellen) Čer.

Halothamnus subaphyllus subsp. charifii (Aellen) Kothe-Heinr.

Synonyms:

- Aellenia subaphylla (C.Meyer) Aellen subsp. charifii Aellen
- Aellenia subaphylla (C.Meyer) Aellen subsp. gracilenta Aellen
- Halothamnus subaphylloides Botsch.

Halothamnus subaphyllus subsp. psammophilus (Botsch.) Kothe-Heinr.

Synonyms:

- Halothamnus psammophilus Botsch.

== Distribution ==
The distribution area of Halothamnus subaphyllus includes Kazakhstan, Turkmenistan, Uzbekistan, Tajikistan, Iran, Afghanistan and Pakistan (Baluchistan). It grows in steppe, semideserts and deserts on stony, clayey or sandy ground, often on salty or gypsum soils, up to 2400 m above sea-level.

== Cultivation and uses ==
Halothamnus subaphyllus is an important fodder plant of the grazed deserts of Middle Asia. It is eaten by sheep, goats and camels and by cattle, therefore it is cultivated in artificial recultivated pasture. Most productive is the subspecies psammophilus.

The subspecies psammophilus is also planted for the stabilisation of mobile sand dunes.

As traditional medicine, Halothamnus subaphyllus is used for women's diseases, for strengthening of the hair, and against scabies of sheep. and for anthrax and healing of wounds. The plants are rich in medically used alkaloids (Subaphyllin, Salsolin).

Furthermore, it is used as dying agent for tissues. The ash of the plants was formerly used to extract soda and potash for making soap. The leaves accumulate boron.

== Vernacular names ==
- Uzbekistan: Čogon, Čogan, Čugon
- Kazakhstan: Šongajna
- Russian: солянка малолистная
