= Victor Botchantsev =

Victor Petrovitch Botchantsev
- Born: 20 October 1910; Almaty
- Died: 30 August 1990 (aged 79); Saint Petersburg, Russia
- Scientific career
- Fields: Botany
- Workplaces: Komarov Botanical Institute
- Author abbrev. (botany): Botsch.

Victor Petrovitch Botchantsev (Russian: Виктор Петрович Бочанцев) (20 October 1910 – 30 August 1990) was a Russian botanist.

The standard author abbreviation Botsch. is used to indicate this person as the author when citing a botanical name.
