= Wadi Tuwa =

- Location within United Arab Emirates
- Coordinates: 25°01′15″N 56°07′32.5″E
- Country: United Arab Emirates
- Emirate: Ras Al Khaimah
- Elevation: 401 m (1,316 ft)

Wadi Tuwa is a wadi, a seasonal waterway, in the Hajar Mountains of Ras Al Khaimah, United Arab Emirates. The wadi is dammed by the Wadi Tuwa Dam.

A popular spot with campers and hikers, Wadi Tuwa is a fertile wadi with many traditional farms dotted throughout its course. Crops cultivated in the wadi include mangoes, dates, onions and tobacco, watered by a number of wells throughout its southeasterly course.

There are a number of petroglyphs, or rock carvings, to be found throughout the wadi, including distinctive leopards, camels, mounted men and horses. These are of a type found in the region, in the Wadi Ejili, Wadi Khadra and Wadi Shawka in particular.

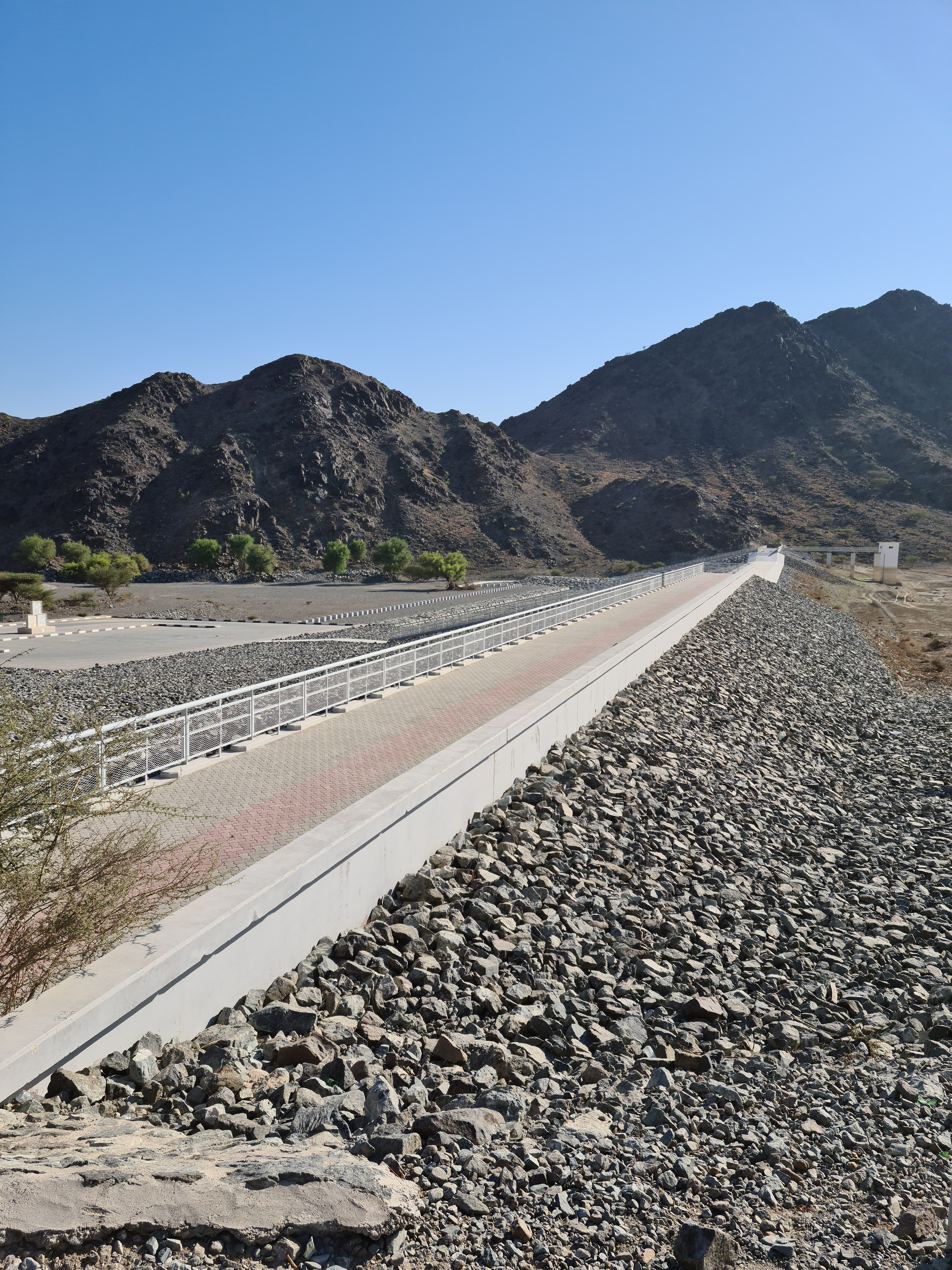
The dam across Wadi Tuwa

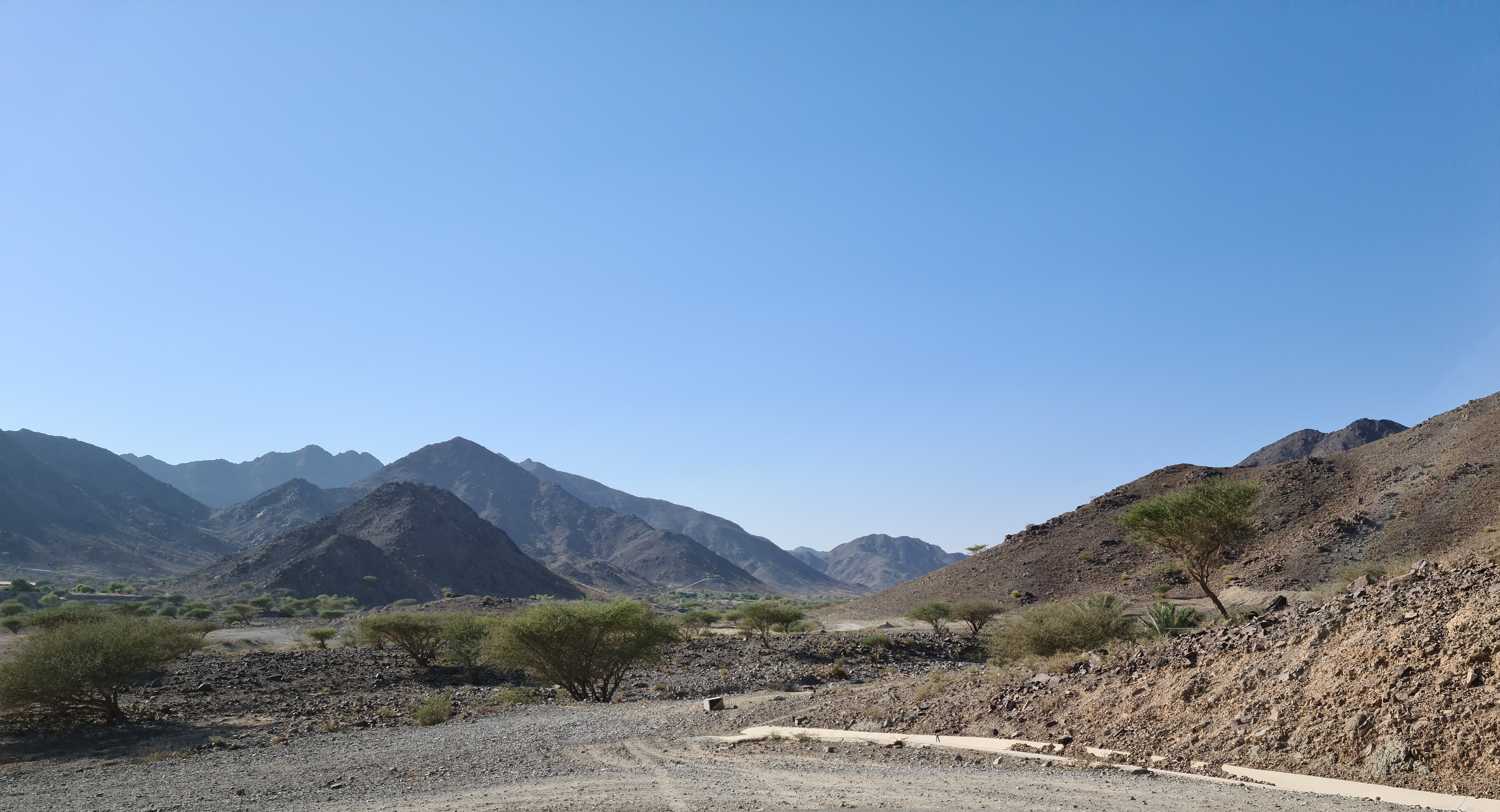
Wadi Tuwa looking up-wadi from the dam

== See also ==
- List of wadis of the United Arab Emirates
