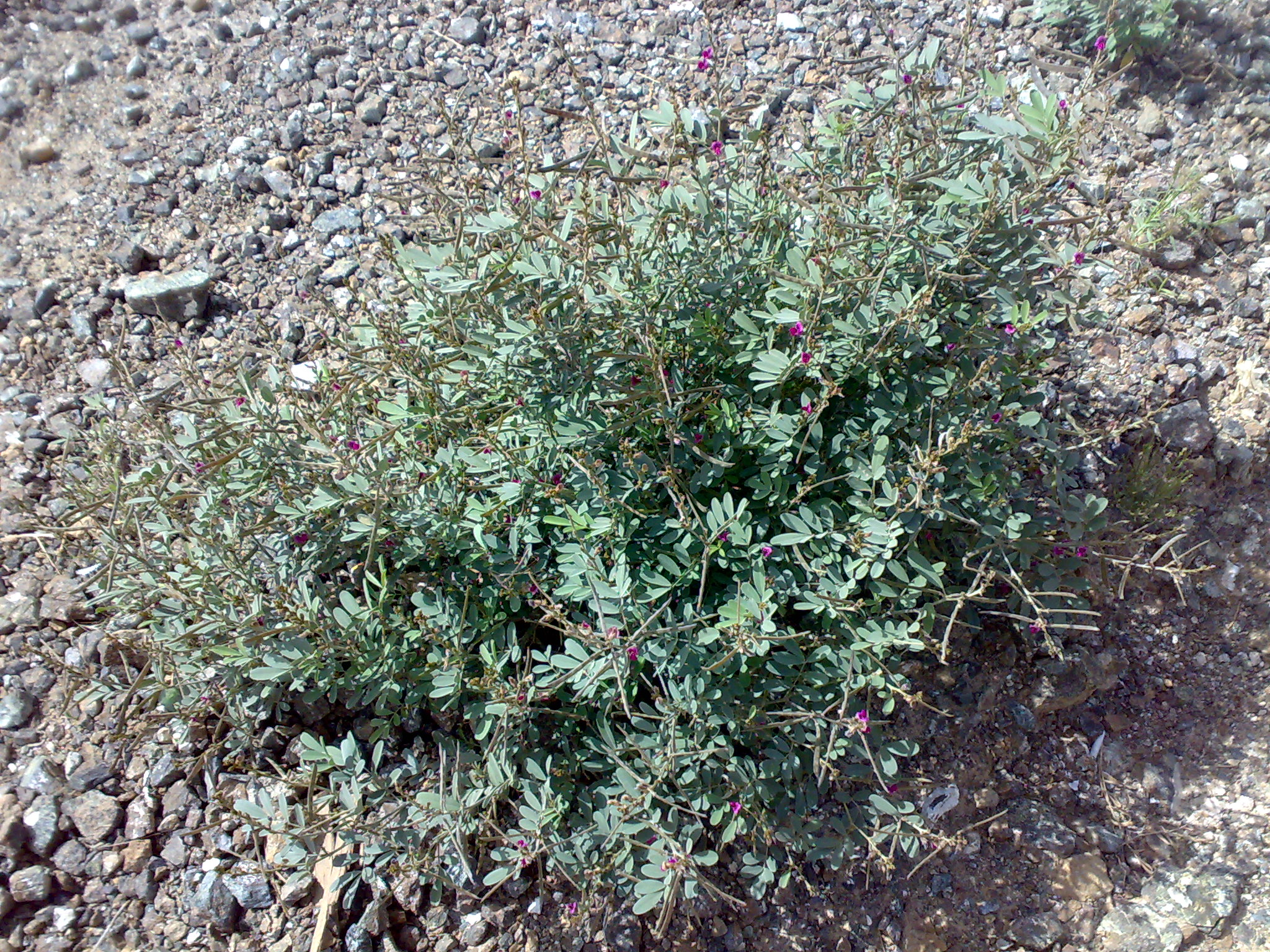

Scientific classification
- Kingdom: Plantae
- Clade: Tracheophytes
- Clade: Angiosperms
- Clade: Eudicots
- Clade: Rosids
- Order: Fabales
- Family: Fabaceae
- Subfamily: Faboideae
- Genus: Tephrosia
- Species: T. purpurea

Binomial name
- Tephrosia purpurea (L.) Pers.
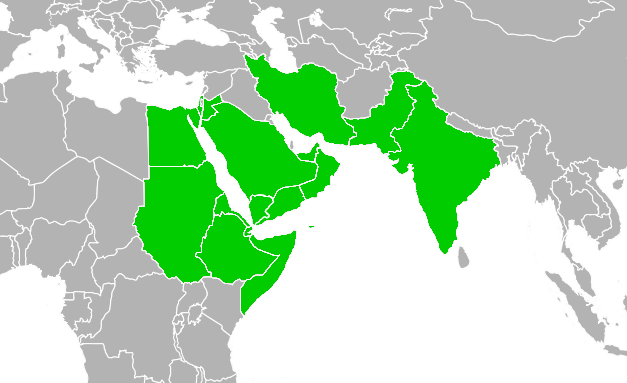
- Distribution by country

Synonyms
- Cracca purpurea L.; Galega apollinea Delile; Galega purpurea (L.) L.; Tephrosia apollinea (Delile) Link

= Tephrosia purpurea =

Species of plant

Tephrosia purpurea is a species of flowering plant in the family Fabaceae. It grows in poor soils as a common wasteland weed and has a pantropical distribution. It is a type of legume native to south-western Asia (the Levant, Arabian Peninsula, Socotra, Iran, Pakistan, India and Sri Lanka) and north-eastern Africa (Egypt, Sudan, Ethiopia, Eritrea, Djibouti, Somalia).

The leaflets of the plant are obovate-oblong and equal-sided, and of a silky texture. The fruits (legumes) are typically 1 to 2 in (25 to 51 mm) long and contain six or seven brownish seeds. The species typically grows in areas where the soils are relatively deep, especially in semi-arid and wadi areas, and on terraces and slight inclines and hills.

Tephrosia purpurea is known to be toxic to goats. Although it has been used in Oman and the United Arab Emirates to treat bronchitis, cough, earache, nasal congestion and wounds and bone fractures, as of 1993 its wider impact on humans had not been assessed. It can be used to make indigo-like dyes, and the leaves and those of other plants are used to make hot drinks by the Bedouin in parts of Sinai and the Negev.

== Description ==
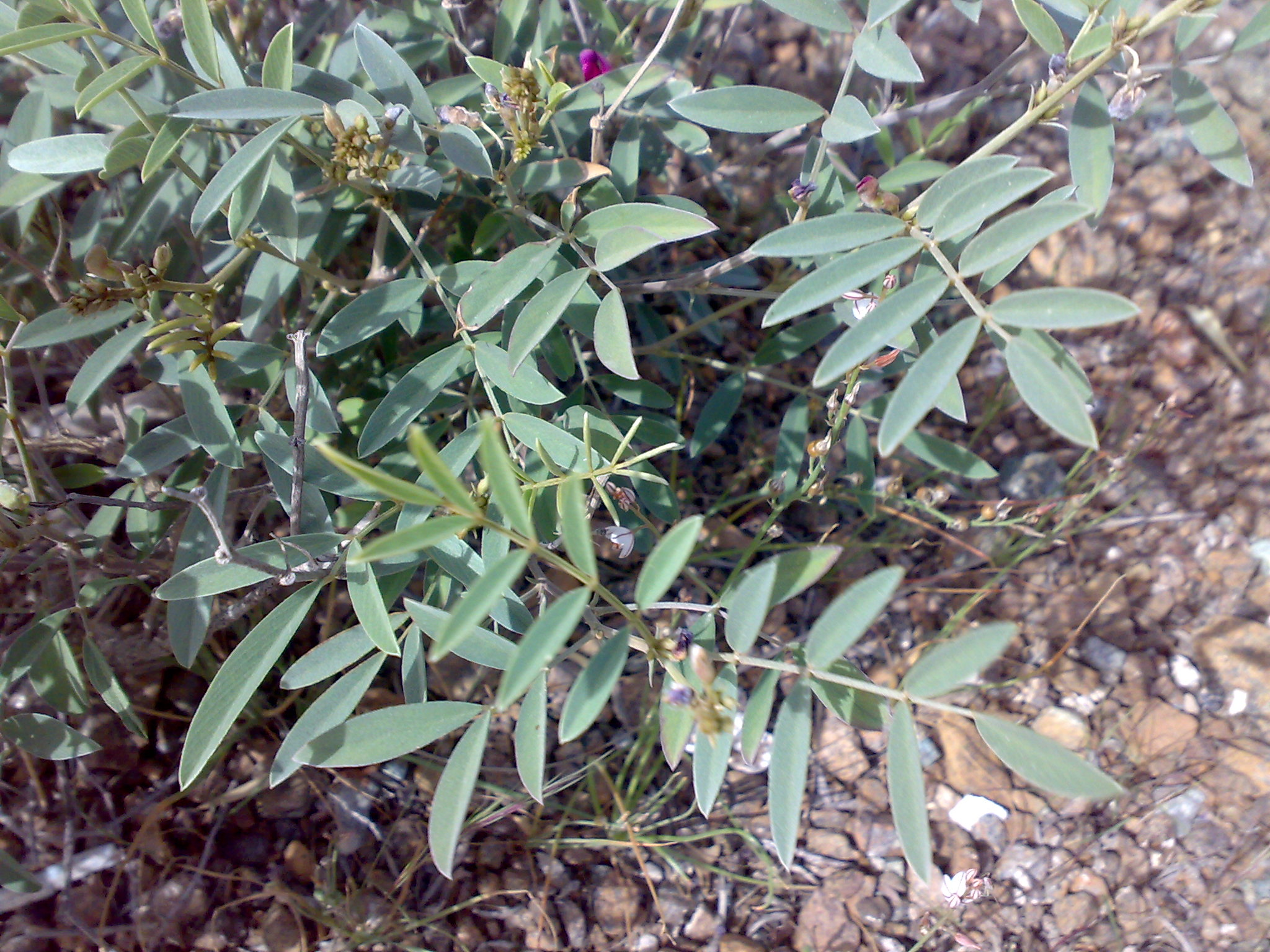
The leaflets of Tephrosia purpurea

The plant's leaflets are obovate-oblong, somewhat wedge-shaped, equal-sided, and of a silky texture. The mid-rib is usually folded longitudinally, and they are characterized by parallel transverse veins. The fruits (legumes) are typically 1 to 2 in (25 to 51 mm) long and contain six or seven brownish seeds. The plant displays purple flowers during season; they are described as their most attractive in January. It typically grows to 45–50 cm (18–20 in) in height, and can grow on mountains with an altitude of over 3,000 ft (910 m). Both diploid (22 chromosomes) and tetraploid (44 chromosomes) cytotypes have been reported.

The roots of Tephrosia purpurea are deep, penetrating soils to a depth of 3 metres or more, aiding the absorption of moisture from the soil. Moisture is stored in the cortex of the roots, which is protected by a thin periderm. Water storage in the cortex enables growth and reproduction during times of drought. This allows it to thrive in both arid and semi-arid conditions and to survive during winter and summer months at times of low rainfall. The roots grow at a faster rate than the shoots themselves, and even at the early stage of the plant displaying a shoot the length of a cm, the roots may already be 30 cm (12 in) or more in length.

There are some regional variations, with plants in the Eastern Desert of Egypt possibly producing smaller pods, leaves, and leaflets, and plants from oases having densely pubescent spreading hairs. Among the features described as differentiating subspecies apollinea from the nominate purpurea are that ssp. apollinea has somewhat longer pods (3.5–5 or sometimes 5.5 cm, rather than 3–4 cm), a wider range in the quantity of seeds per pod (generally 7–9, as low as 3, rather than generally 5–6, or sometimes 7), the pods being curved upwards rather than downwards, and leaflets having 9 rather than 7 lateral veins.

== Taxonomy ==
The subspecies apollinea was initially named Galega apollinea by Alire Raffeneau Delile in 1813, and moved to the genus Tephrosia by Johann Heinrich Friedrich Link in 1822. Its current treatment as a subspecies of Tephrosia purpurea, was proposed by Hasnaa A. Hosni and Zeinab A. R. El-Karemy in 1993. after finding that their previous descriptions "agree in most of their characters and the distinction between typical forms was rather difficult" The full name with authorities under their revised classification is Tephrosia purpurea (L.) Pers. subsp. apollinea (Delile) Hosni & El-Karemy.

In parts of southern Arabia, the species carries the vernacular name of hailara, and it is also known as dhafra, dhawasi, omayye or nafal to Arabs, and written as رﮭﻔط in the Arabic language. In the Sinai area of Egypt, it is referred to by the Bedouin as sanna or senna. It is also known as amioka in parts of Sudan. Due to its traditional use in making indigo dyes, Tephrosia purpurea has also been referred to as "Egyptian indigo".

== Distribution and habitat ==
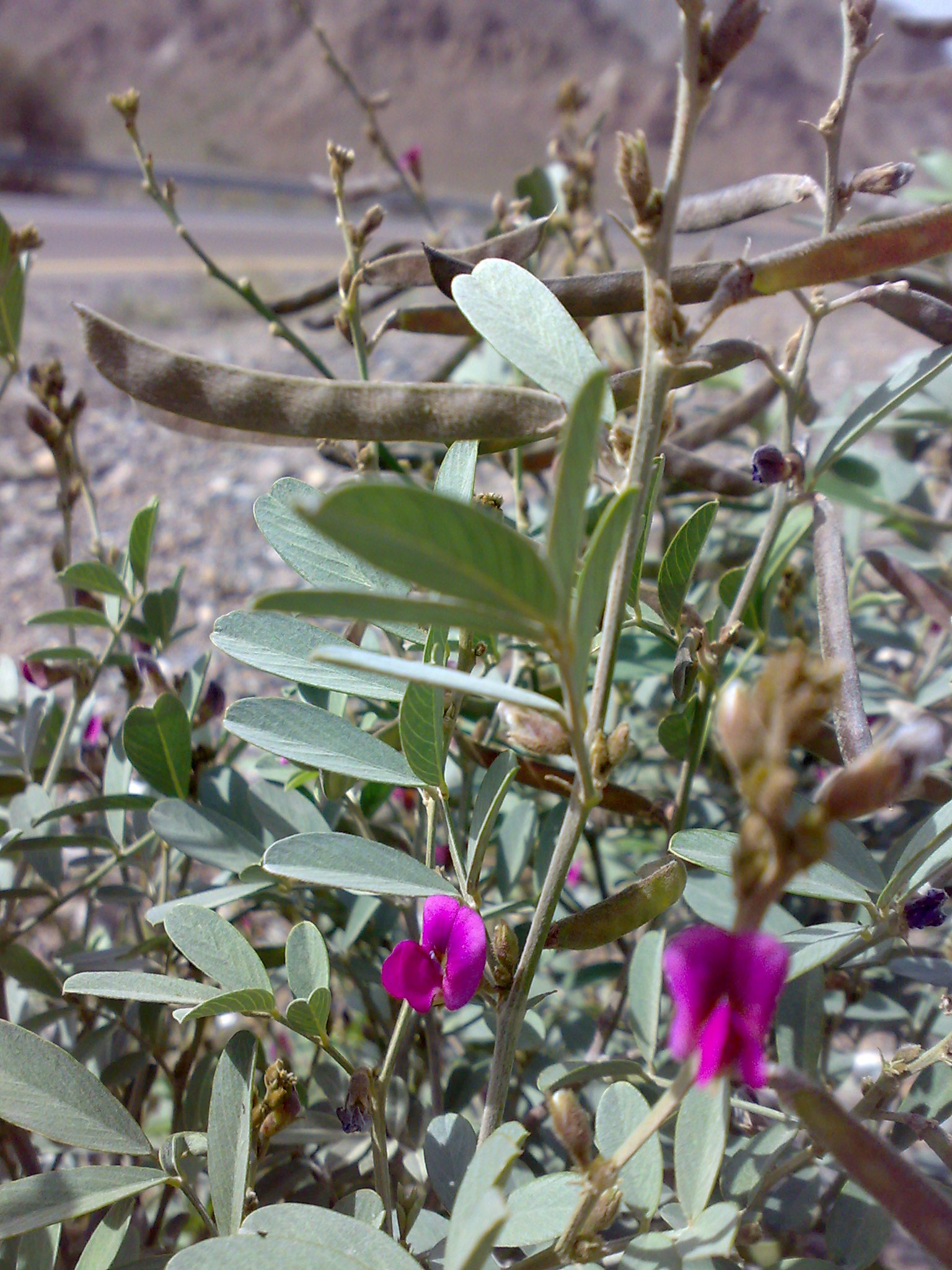
Flowers, leaves, and fruit (legume pods)

The species is recorded in the north-eastern African nations of Djibouti, Egypt, Eritrea, Ethiopia, Somalia, and Sudan, the Western Asian nations of Iran, Israel, Jordan, Oman, Saudi Arabia, South Yemen, the United Arab Emirates, and Yemen (including the Yemeni island of Socotra), and the South Asian nations of India and Pakistan. Within India, it is documented in the western states of Gujarat, Maharashtra, and Rajasthan.

The species, cited as a "leguminous desert forb", typically grows in areas where the soils are relatively deep, especially in semi-arid and wadi areas, and on terraces and slight inclines and hills. In Saudi Arabia, it has been found scattered among species such as Zilla spinosa, Rhanterium epapposum, Astragalus spinosus, Gymnocarpos decandrum, Achillea fragrantissima and Halothamnus bottae on the edges of desiccated lakes.

It has been well documented in sources in Egypt and Sudan. In 1866, the Pharmaceutical Journal stated that it was found as a contaminant in Alexandrian senna, being found in cultivated fields in the valleys to the east and south of Assouan, in the Elephantine Islands, opposite Assouan, along the Nile, and Edfou and Hermonthis. In Israel, it grows in the Judean Desert, the Dead Sea Valley, the Negev hills, and Eilat.

In wadi areas of Yemen, it tends to grow on desert alluvial shrubland and coexist with Fagonia indica, Cymbopogon schoenanthus, and Boerhavia elegans. An example of Tephrosia purpurea was found by Harry St John Bridger Philby in 1936 at Raiyan, about 150 mi (240 km) northeast of Sana'a. In Socotra, an island off the coast of Yemen, it is typically found in the Croton shrubland of lowland plains at altitudes of between sea level and 100 metres on overgrazed soils, along with Cassia holsericea. In a 2000s analysis of vegetation in the woodlands of northern Socotra, the species was found to coexist with Achyranthus aspera, Ageratum conyzoides, Bidens chinensis, Forsskaolea viridis, Hibiscus vitifolius, Indigofera coerulea, Leucas urticifolia, Setaria adhaerens and Solanum incanum.

Tephrosia purpurea is also found in the United Arab Emirates and in Oman, where it inhabits the Jiddat al-Harasis desert and dominates the beds of wadis in mountains such as Jebel Shams.

== Toxicity ==
Tephrosia purpurea is cited as "unpalatable", although the seeds of the plant are reportedly a favourite of sandgrouse inhabiting the scrub-desert of northern Sudan, and the butterfly Colias croceus is known to feed on it. This has allowed it to colonize the landscape in parts of the Middle East which have been overgrazed, especially at lower altitudes.

The species is known to be toxic to goats; a study published in the early 1980s revealed that 11 out of 12 goats died after 1 to 40 days of daily oral dosing of Tephrosia purpurea shoots (fresh or dried), and that they displayed adverse reactions to ingesting it such as dyspnoea, weakness of the limbs and joints causing instability in movement, changes in fat composition, catarrhal enteritis, and hemorrhage in the heart, lungs, and intestinal mucosa. Rotenoids extracted from the seeds of the plant also caused complete mortality in Aphis craccivora, when applied at a concentration of 0.1% for 48 hours.

== Uses ==
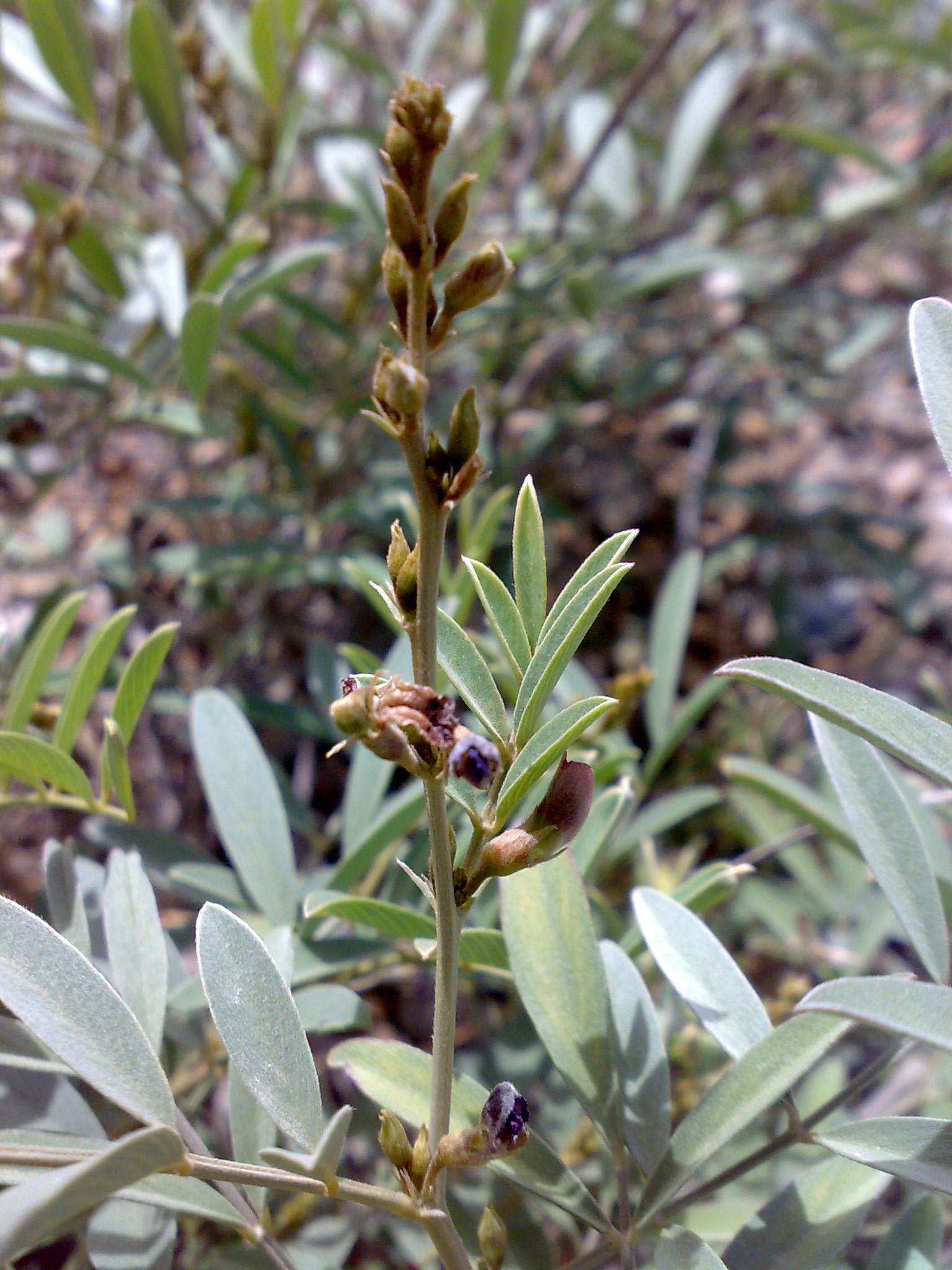
Tephrosia purpurea blooming

=== Dyes ===
Tephrosia purpurea can be used to make indigo dyes. The species was noted to be commonly cultivated for this purpose in Nubia in the 1800s.

=== Ethnomedicine ===
Tephrosia purpurea is also used in folk medicine and has some anti-bacterial properties. According to Ayurveda, the plant is anthelmintic, alexiteric, restorative, and antipyretic.

The leaves and the root have been used in traditional medicinal on bronchitis, cough, earache, wounds and bone fractures by herbalists in countries such as Oman and the United Arab Emirates. The ground leaves of Tephrosia purpurea are also insufflated in cases of nasal congestion, or boiled with water to make eardrops. Powdered bark can be mixed with water and poured into the ears of camels with ticks, and powdered leaves have been made into a paste to be smeared on wounds. It has also been rubbed on limbs in conjunction with Fagonia indica and Ocomim basilicum of people affected with polio, without any effect.

It is used in the treatment of leprosy, ulcers, asthma, and tumors, as well as diseases of the liver, spleen, heart, and blood. A decoction of the roots is given in dyspepsia, diarrhea, rheumatism, asthma and urinary disorders. The root powder is salutary for brushing the teeth, where it is said to quickly relieve dental pains and stop bleeding. An extract, termed 'betaphroline' (not a systematic name) is claimed to promote release of endorphins, and finds use in certain cosmetic preparations. African shepherds use crushed plants to make an antidotal beverage for animals bitten by snakes.

=== Herbal tea ===
Although unpalatable when consumed raw, when boiled the leaves of Tephrosia purpurea and numerous other plants are used to make hot drinks by the Bedouin in parts of Sinai and the Negev. But herbalists in Oman warn that Tephrosia purpurea can be potentially harmful to humans, and as of 1993, it had not been fully analyzed chemically to assess the wider impact it could have on health.

=== Fish poison ===
Tephrosia purpurea is used as a fish poison for fishing. Its leaves and seeds contain tephrosin, which paralyzes fish. Larger doses are lethal to fish, but mammals and amphibians are unaffected.

== Phytochemistry ==
When dried, the leaves of Tephrosia purpurea were found to contain 4.4% moisture, 21.1% of crude protein, 19.8% of crude fiber, and 10.9% of ash. A chemical analysis found that it contains rotenoids, isolflavones, flavanones, chalcones, and flavones, The chloroform extract of the aerial part of Tephrosia purpurea also revealed seven new 8-prenylated flavonoids, including tephroapollin A-G (1-7).

In 2006, researchers of Oman's Sultan Qaboos University published their findings from a chemical investigation into the leaves in which they found it contained semiglabrin, semigalbrinol, and a new flavanone named apollineanin. One 2014 study revealed that pseudosemiglabrin extracted from the aerial parts of Tephrosia purpurea had an antiproliferative effect on cancer cell lines.

A study of Tephrosia purpurea from the Wadi Ejili, in Ras Al Khaimah, UAE, focusing on seeds collected from specimens of the traditional medicinal plant explored its exogenous production of silver nanoparticles. The study is thought to be the first time the antimicrobial activity of silver nanoparticles synthesized via living plants has been observed.
