= Shawka =

- Location within United Arab Emirates
- Coordinates: 25°6′0″N 56°2′0″E
- Country: United Arab Emirates
- Emirate: Ras Al Khaimah
- Elevation: 421 m (1,381 ft)

Shawka is a village in Ras Al Khaimah, United Arab Emirates. It is a popular hiking destination, noted for the popular hiking areas around the wadi Shawka and the Shawka Dam. The dam, originally constructed in 2001, was part of a $33.4m 2020 reconstruction project that aimed to shore up and protect dams and waterways in the region. In an area noted for its high levels of rainfall and fertility in the Winter and Spring, Shawka enjoyed record levels of rainfall in 2020 - according to local residents rainfall in 2020 was the heaviest in 30 years.
