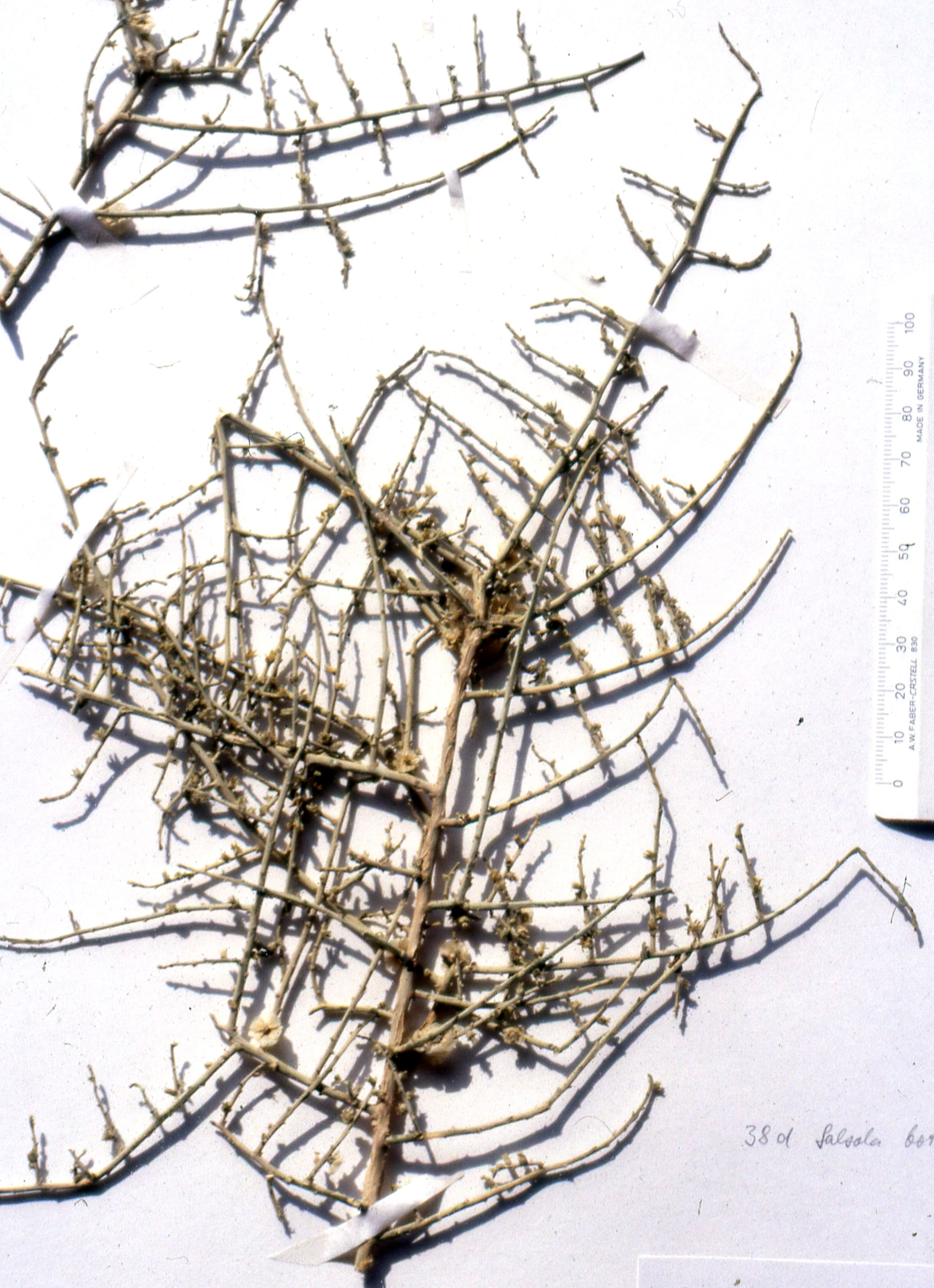

Scientific classification
- Kingdom: Plantae
- Clade: Tracheophytes
- Clade: Angiosperms
- Clade: Eudicots
- Order: Caryophyllales
- Family: Amaranthaceae
- Genus: Halothamnus
- Species: H. bottae

Binomial name
- Halothamnus bottae Jaub. & Spach

Synonyms
- Caroxylon bottae (Jaub. & Spach) Moq.; Salsola bottae (Jaub. & Spach) Boiss.

= Halothamnus bottae =

Species of flowering plant

Halothamnus bottae is a species of the plant genus Halothamnus, that belongs to the subfamily Salsoloideae of the family Amaranthaceae. It occurs on the Arabian Peninsula.

== Morphology ==
Halothamnus bottae is a shrub 30–50 cm high, with blueish-green, thorny branches. The leaves are standing off from the branches, they are triangular, and only 0,7-3 (rarely 8) mm long. The flowers are 2,6-3,6 mm long. The winged fruit is 6–9 mm in diameter. The bottom of the fruit tube has large ovate shallow pits alternating with five prominent radial veins (from the navel to the tepals).

The subspecies H. bottae subsp. niger differs by green twigs soon becoming black, and by dark brown wings of fruit.

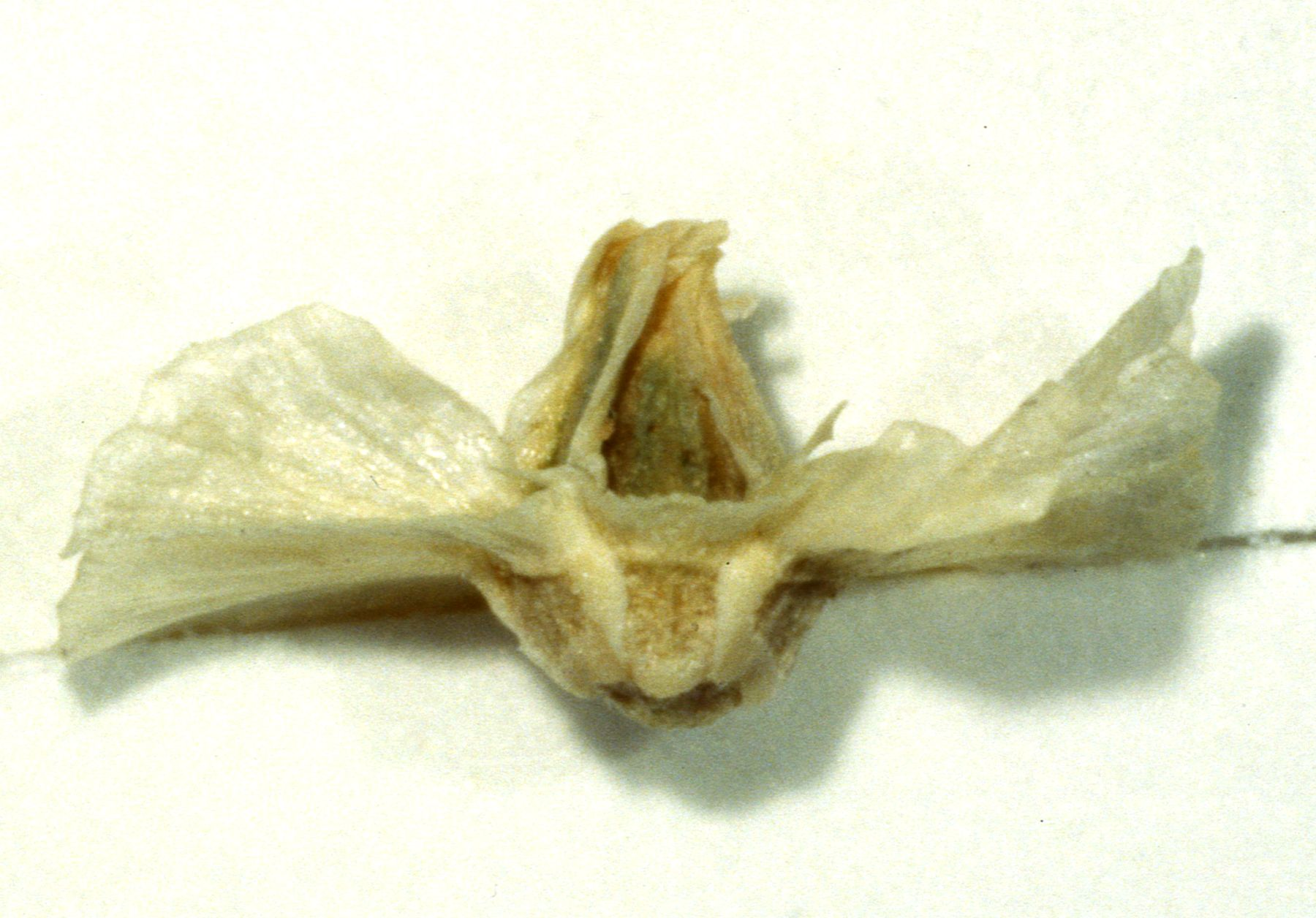
fruit (lateral view)

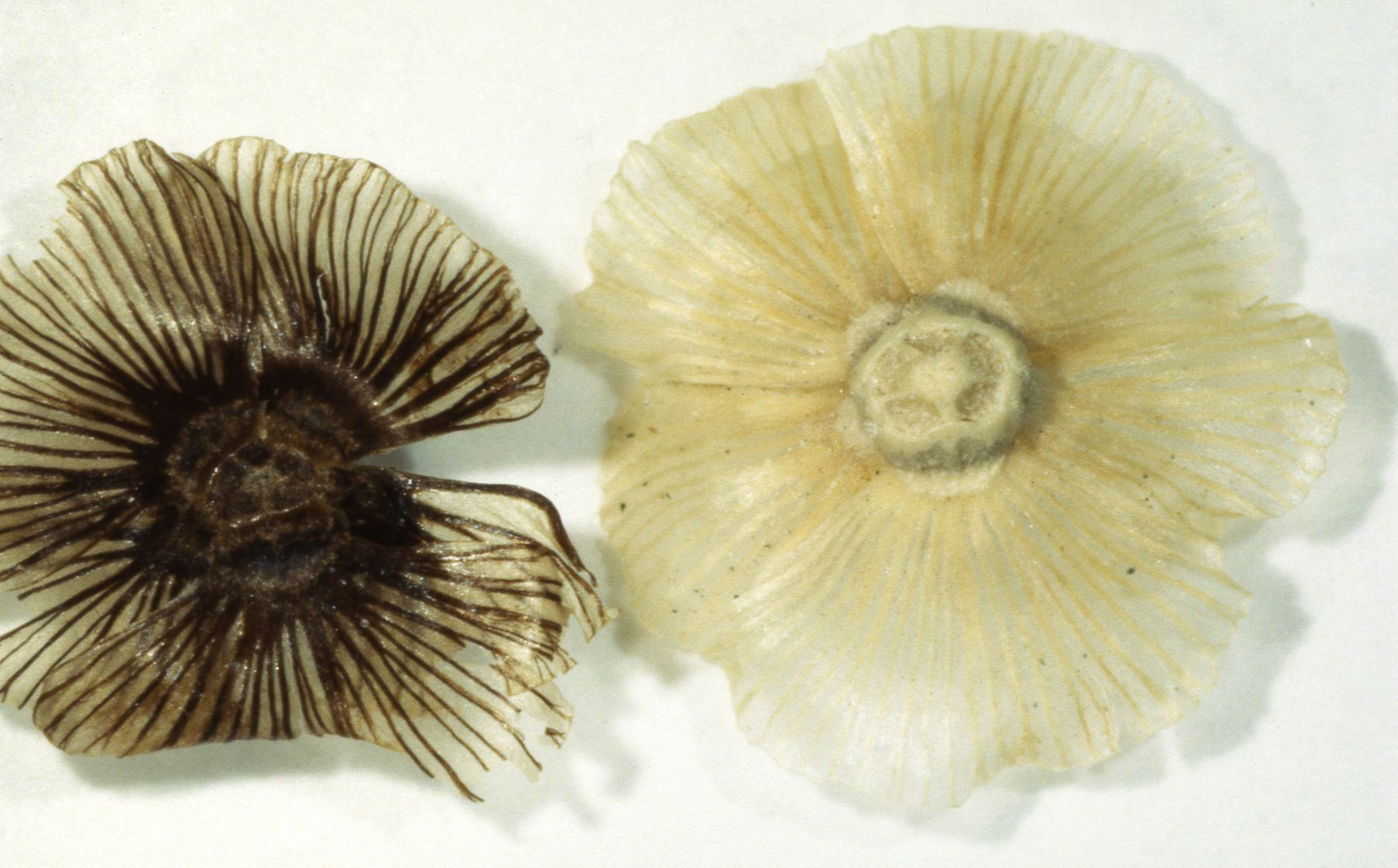
fruits (bottom) of subsp. niger (left) and subsp. bottae (right)

== Taxonomy ==
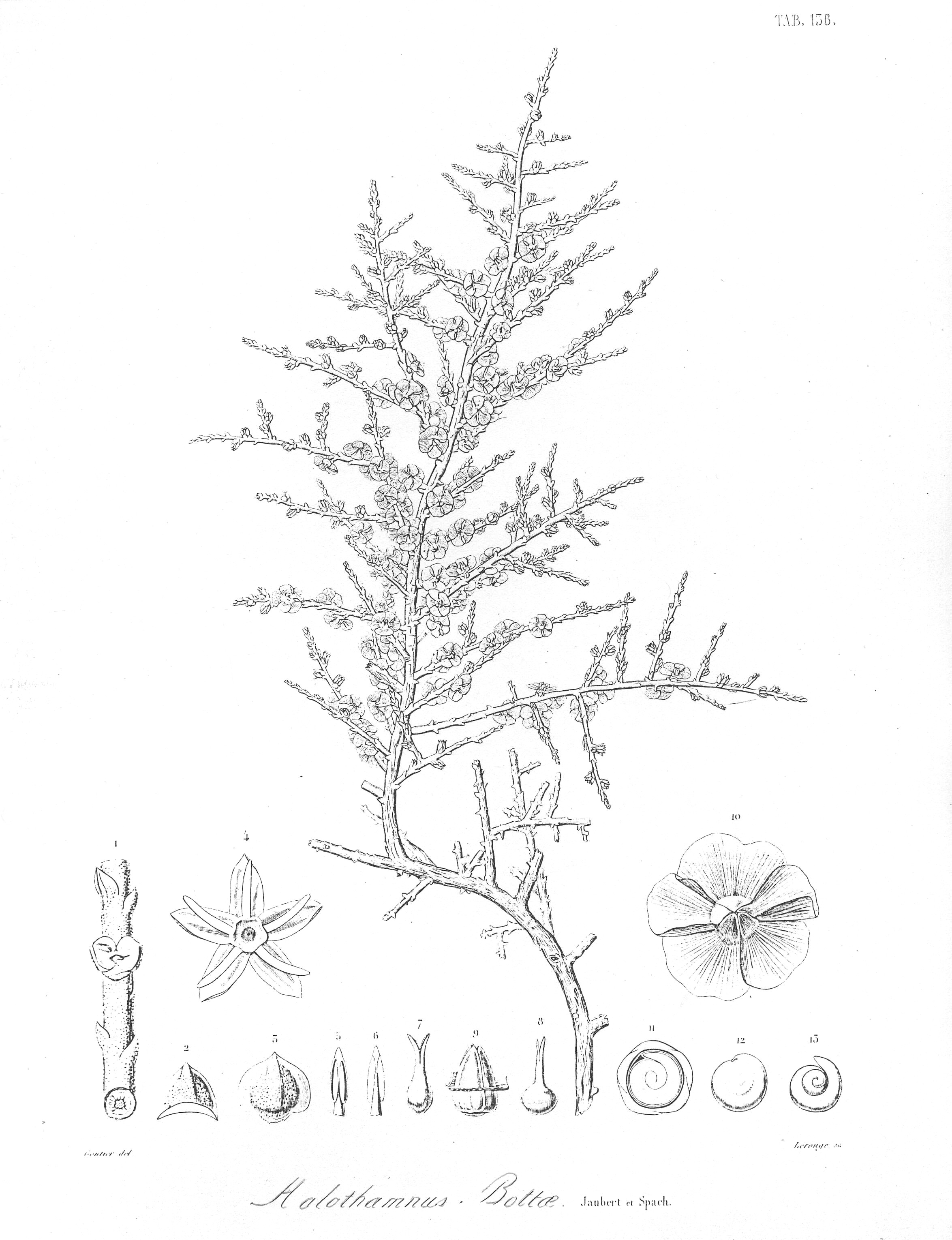
Illustration of Halothamnus bottae from the original description by Jaubert & Spach, 1845

Halothamnus bottae has been first described in 1845 by Hippolyte François Jaubert and Édouard Spach (in Illustrationes plantarum orientalium, volume 2, pl. 136). It is the type species of the genus Halothamnus.

It consists of two subspecies:

- Halothamnus bottae subsp. bottae
- Halothamnus bottae subsp. niger Kothe-Heinr.

== Distribution ==
Halothamnus bottae is endemic on the Arabian peninsula (Saudi Arabia, Yemen, Oman, United Arab Emirates). It grows in open shrubland and semidesert on dry stony ground, from 0–2000 m above sea level. The subspecies H. bottae subsp. niger occurs only on southern Arabian peninsula, in hot arid lowlands up to 100 m above sea level (similar plants from eastern Africa belong to Halothamnus somalensis).

== Uses ==
In Oman, the dried parts of Halothamnus bottae are used as snuff.

== Vernacular names ==
In Saudi Arabia, it is known as "hamḑ al-arnab" and "tiḩyan". In Oman, Jibbali and Dhofari, commons names are "hamdeh" and "kizzot". In Yemen, it is called "asal" and "tanēt".
