= Wadi Ejili =

- Location within United Arab Emirates
- Coordinates: 25°02′08″N 56°09′08.3″E
- Country: United Arab Emirates
- Emirate: Ras Al Khaimah
- Elevation: 421 m (1,381 ft)

Wadi Ejili is a wadi, or seasonal watercourse, in the Hajar Mountains of Ras Al Khaimah, United Arab Emirates. It runs down from the confluence of the Wadi Shawka and Wadi Esfai to run into the Wadi Helo at the village of Fayyad, on the Sharjah-Kalba Highway (E102).

== Extent ==
The wadi runs from the northwest to the southeast Hajar Mountain ranges through the settlement of Al Ejili. A number of abandoned settlements line the course of the wadi, as well as plentiful modern plantations. There are petroglyphs etched in the rocks of the wadi, which is frequently subject to intense rainfall and flash floods in both winter and summer months.

=== Petroglyphs ===
Distinctive petroglyphs, or stone carvings, of camels, bulls, other animals and both male and female figures are to be found in the Wadi Ejili. Carvings featuring bulls include a solid bull with long horns held on a rope by a man with upraised arms. These are present despite no contemporary evidence of wells operated by using bulls to raise water in the area. Rock carvings to either side of the wadi depict leopards and possibly wolves, including a carving of a wolf apparently pulling at a man’s wizra.

=== Flora ===
A study of flora from the Wadi Ejili, focusing on seeds collected from specimens of the traditional medicinal plant Tephrosia apollinea, explored the exogenous production of silver nanoparticles by the plant. A perennial shrub native to the United Arab Emirates and found in lower mountain regions, Tephrosia apollinea has long been used as a traditional medicine to relieve nasal congestion, earache, wounds, and bone fractures and it has been found to have insecticidal, anticancer and antibacterial properties. The study is thought to be the first time the antimicrobial activity of silver nanoparticles synthesized via living plants has been observed.

== Gallery ==
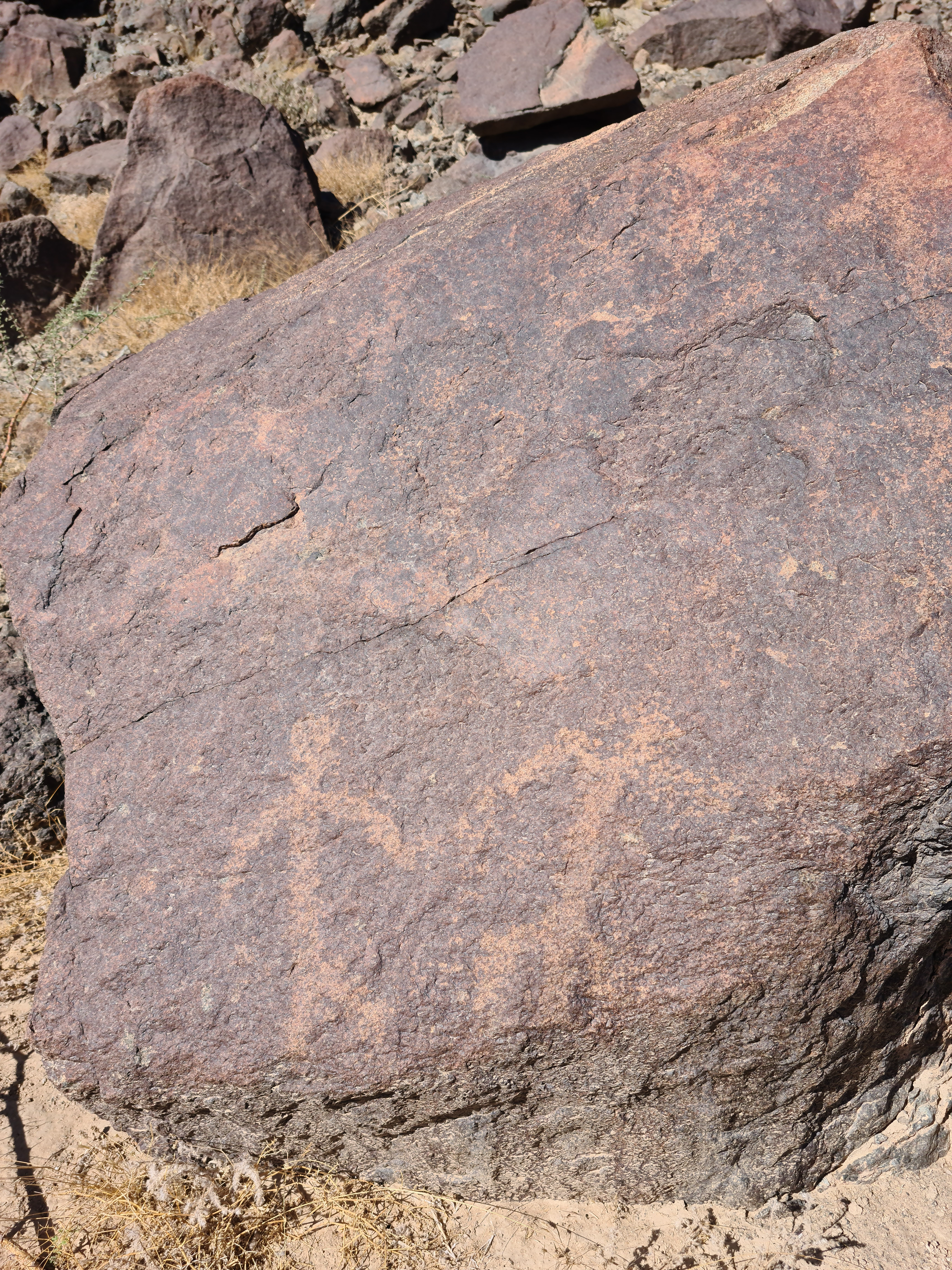
Petroglyphs etched on rock in the lower reaches of the Wadi Ejili

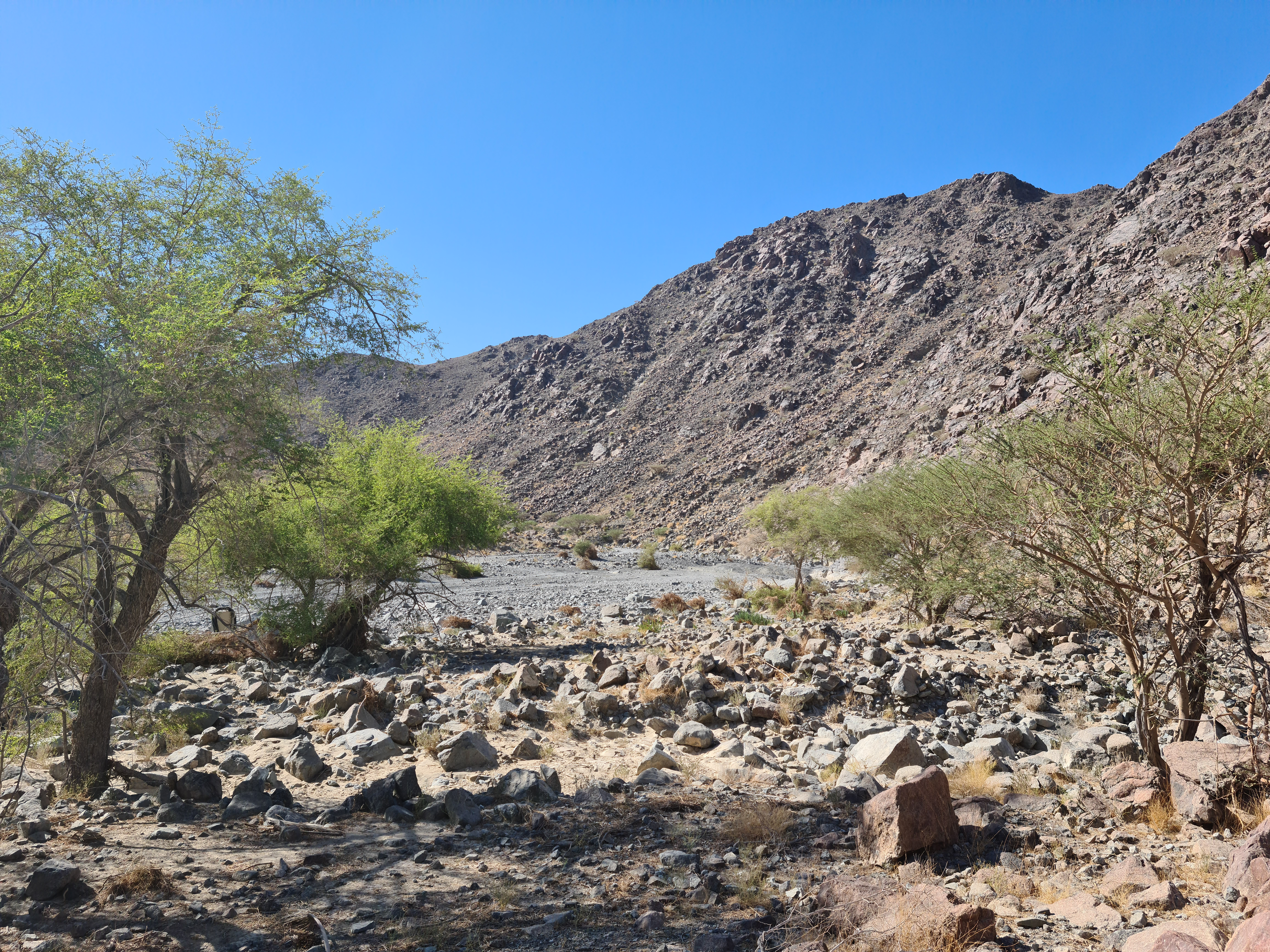
The lower reaches of the Wadi Ejili watercourse

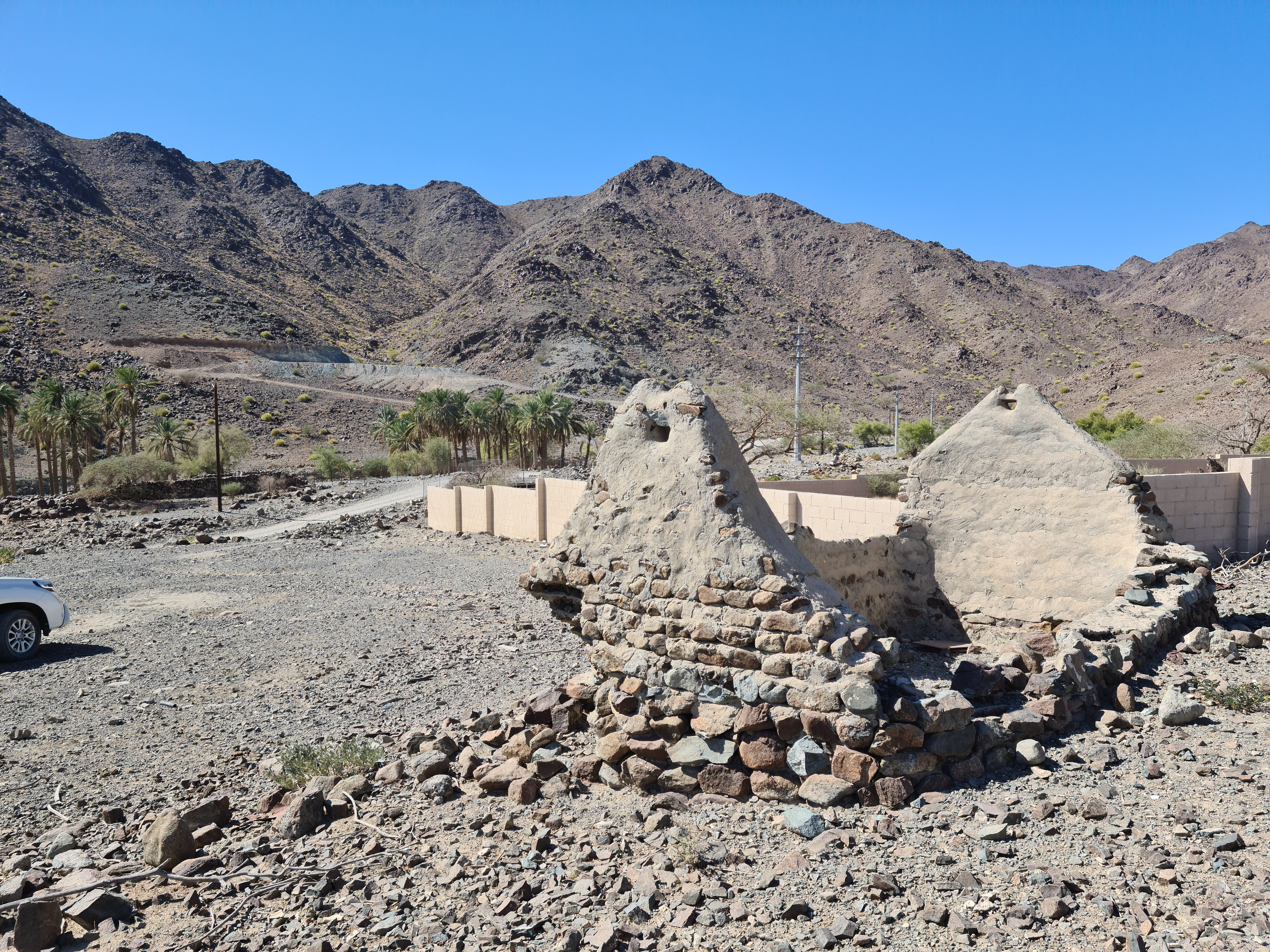
Abandoned house in the Wadi Ejili, Ras Al Khaimah

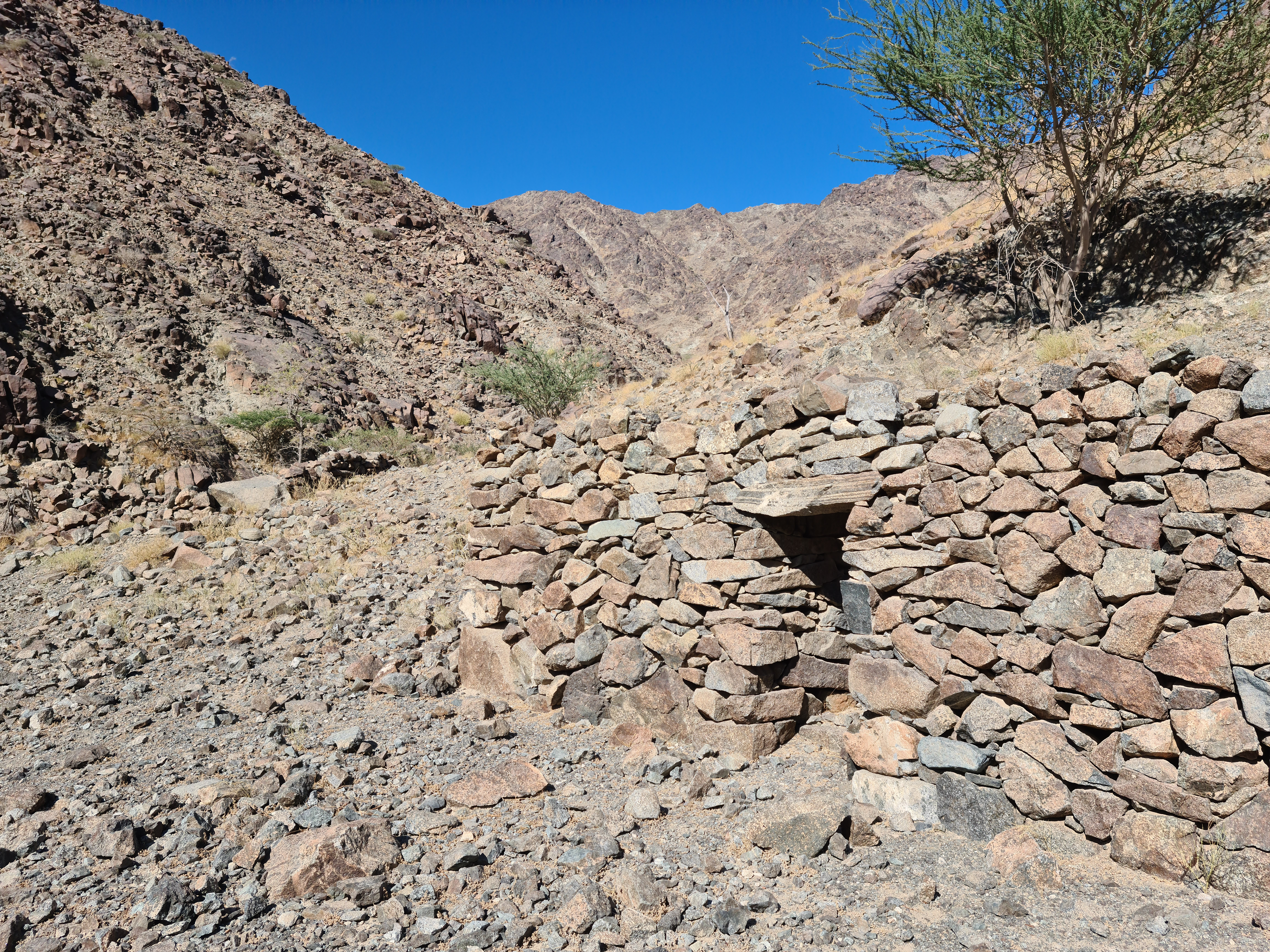
Old settlement in the Wadi Ejili, north of Fayyad in the Wadi Helo

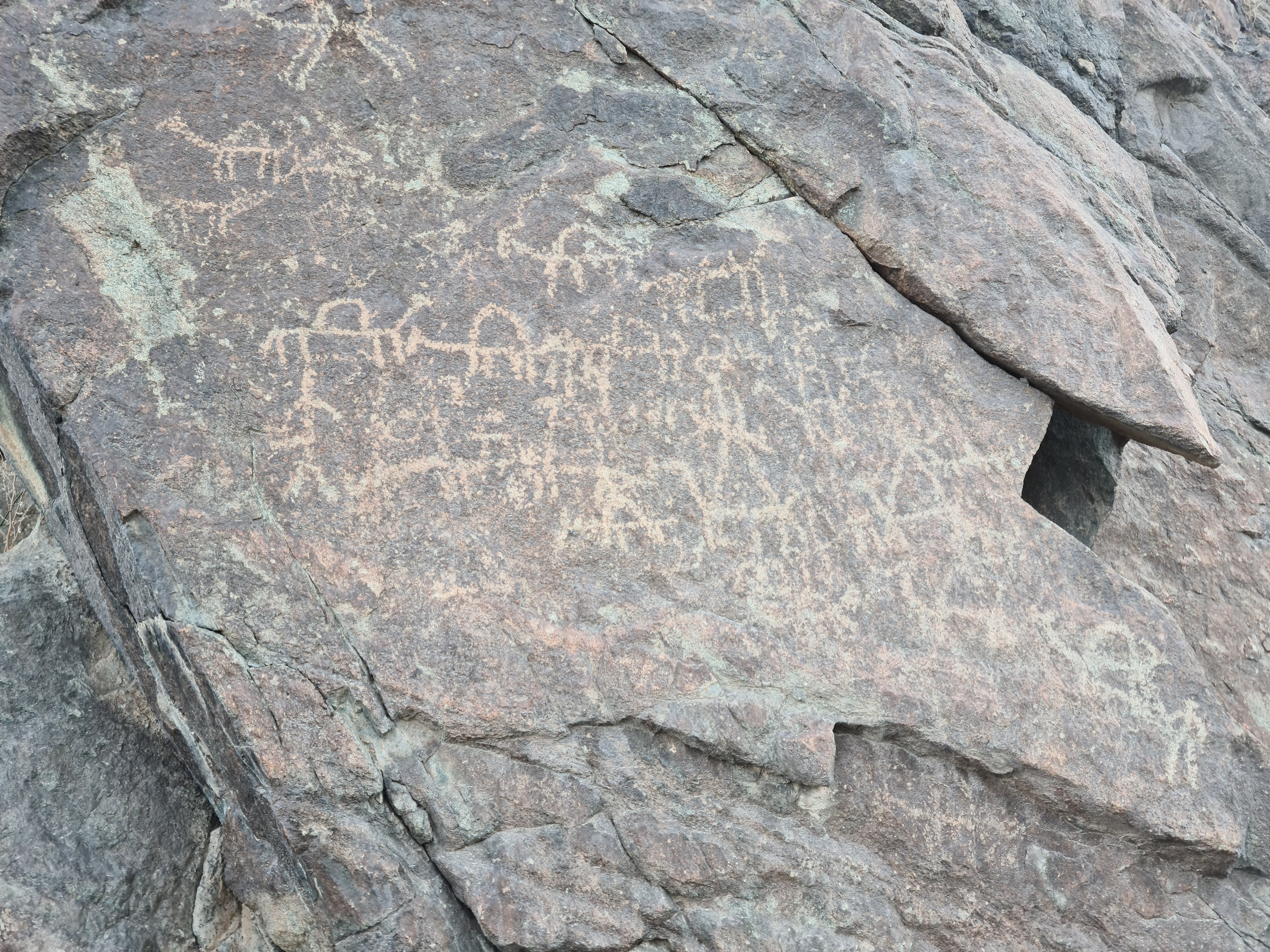
A collection of petroglyphs on the right hand side of the lower reaches of the Wadi Eliji, below the village of Wadi Eliji.

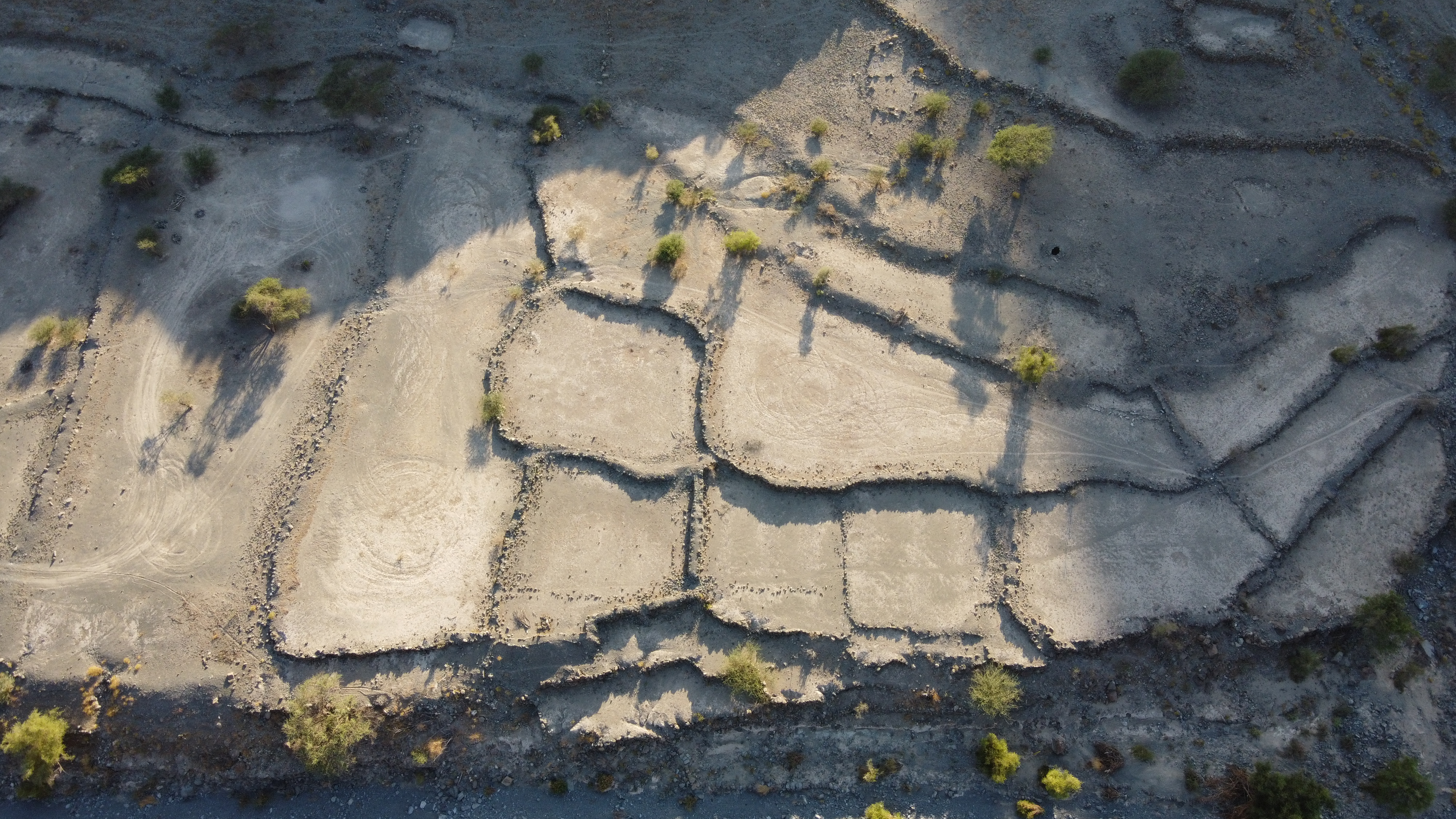
Abandoned fields in the Wadi Ejili.

== See also ==
- List of wadis of the United Arab Emirates
