= Wadi Shawka =

- Location within United Arab Emirates
- Coordinates: 25°6′0″N 56°2′0″E
- Country: United Arab Emirates
- Emirate: Ras Al Khaimah
- Elevation: 421 m (1,381 ft)

Wadi Shawka (literally 'powerful wadi') is a seasonal watercourse in the Hajar Mountains of Ras Al Khaimah, in the United Arab Emirates. Famous locally for the Shawka Dam, a renowned beauty spot and destination for outdoor sports, the wadi has long been an agricultural area and alongside existing farms, and many abandoned settlements exist on the sides of the wadi. The wadi enjoys unusually high rainfall of some 120mm per annum.

== Extent ==
Wadi Shawka is a popular destination for hikers as well as families attracted to the Shawka Dam, a developed rest area and picnic spot. The wadi runs from the village of Khari, north of the village of Shawka, to join the Wadi Esfai and the Wadi Ejili. A number of tourism companies and hiking groups offer hikes in and around the upper reaches of the Wadi Shawka.

The Shawka Dam was originally constructed in 2001, on the orders of Sheikh Zayed Al Nahyan, and overlooks a developed recreational area with a children's play area, washrooms, a family barbecue area and a number of pools. The dam has a 275,000 cubic metre capacity and, with a height of 13 metres and a length of 107 metres, is considered one of the largest dams in the Emirates.

Shawka Dam

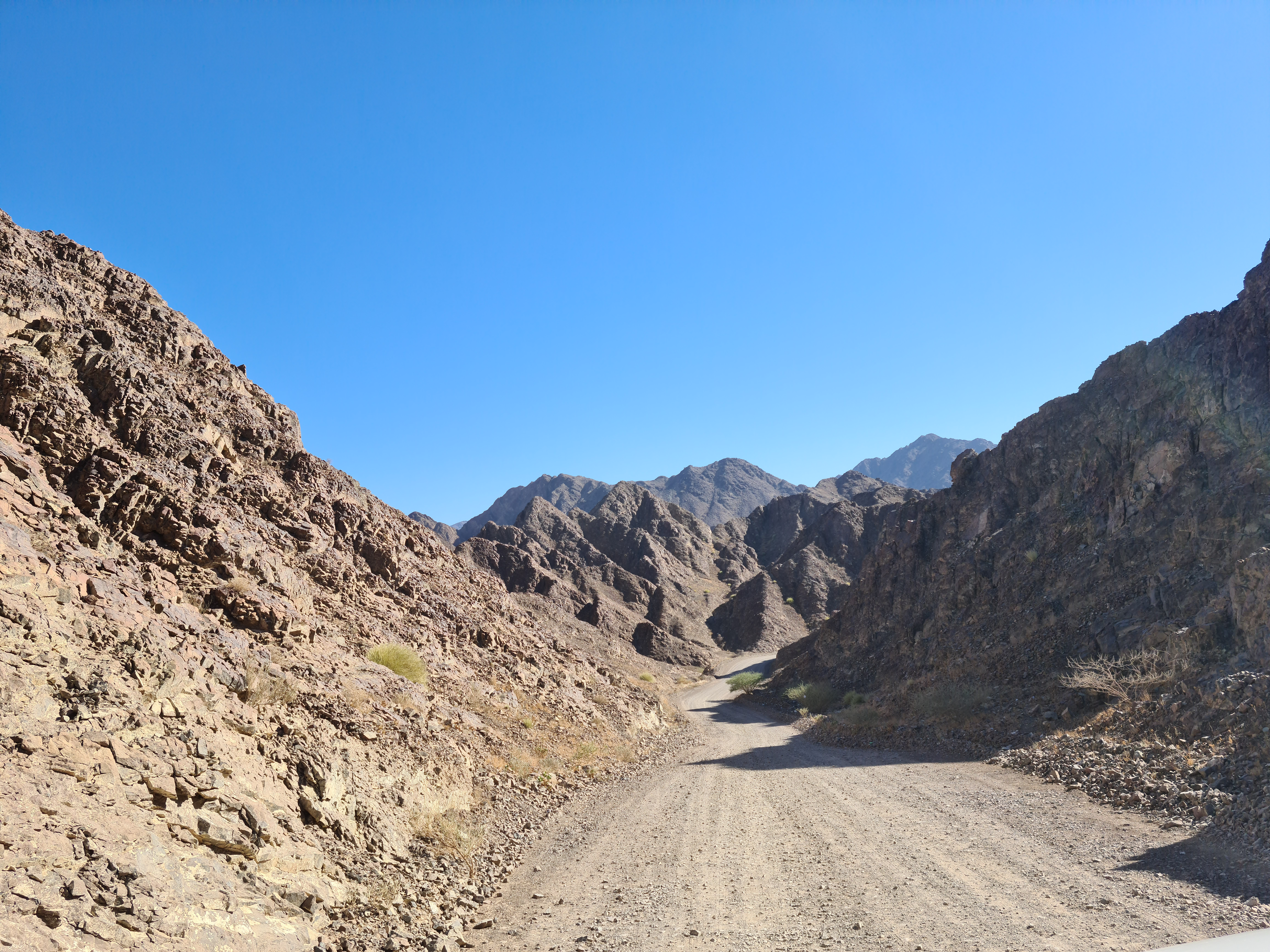
Wadi Shawka Track

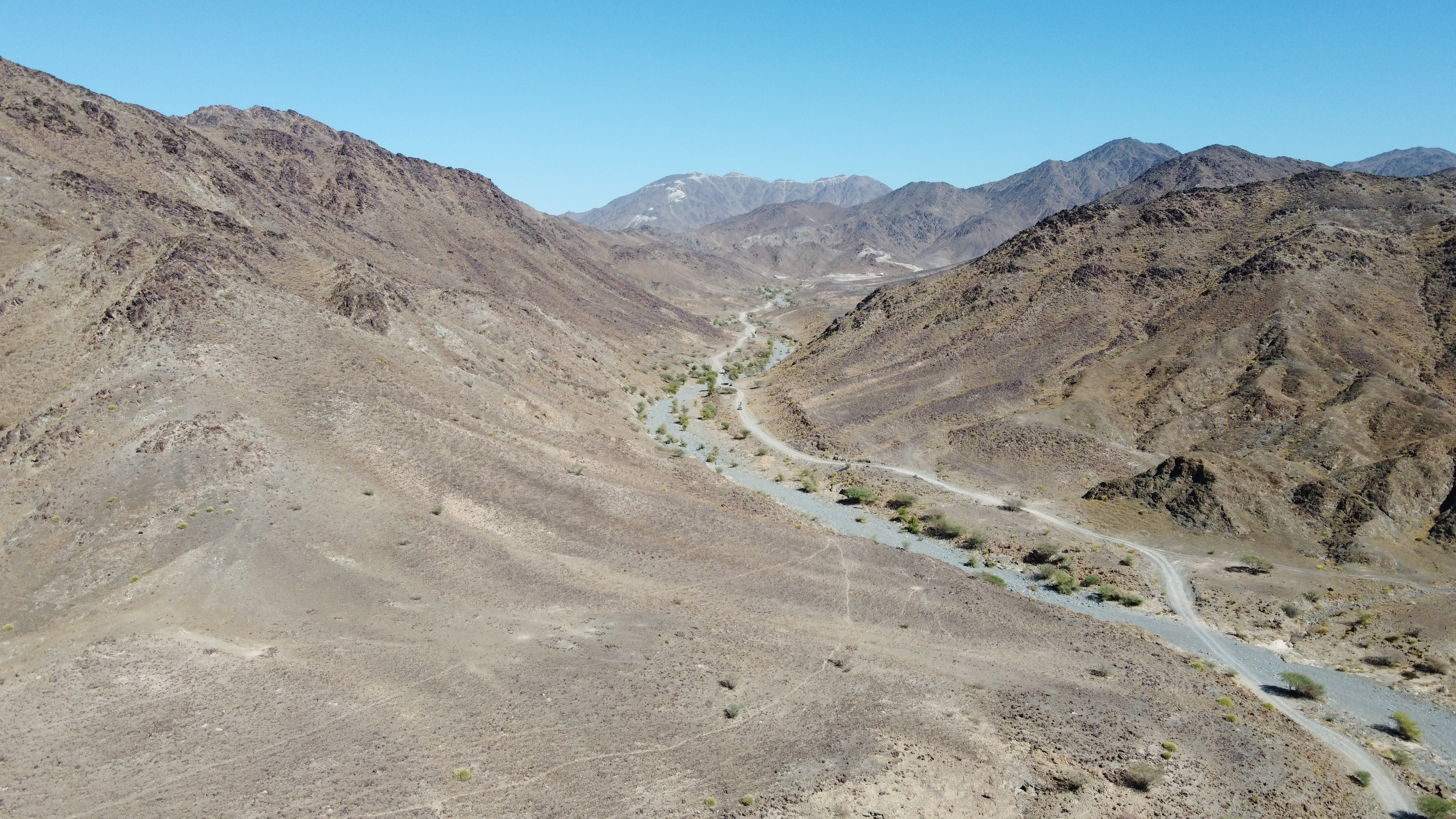
Wadi Shawka looking north

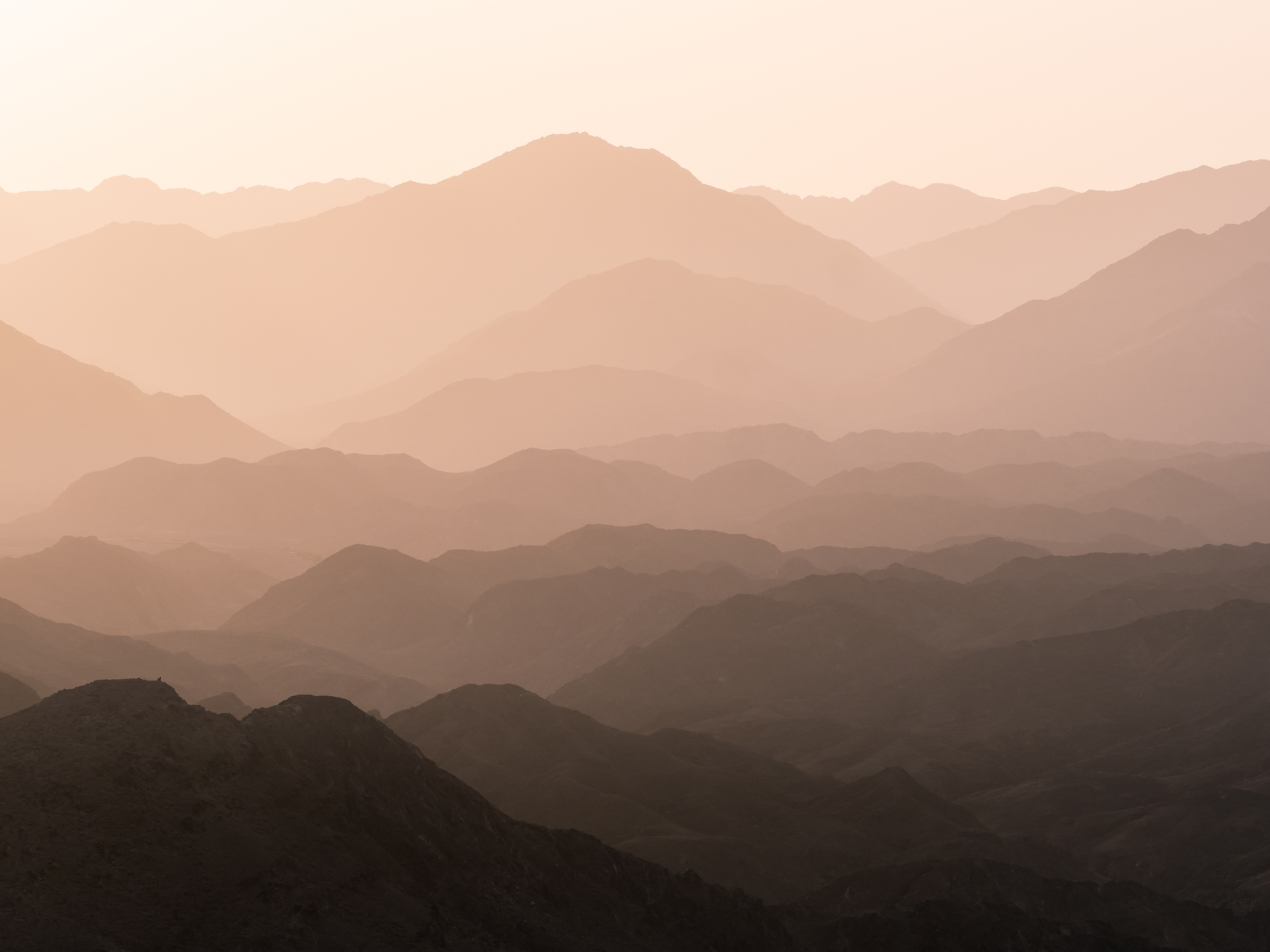
Mountains view

== See also ==
- List of wadis of the United Arab Emirates
